= List of hospitals in England =

The following is a list of hospitals in England. For NHS trusts, see the list of NHS Trusts.

== East Midlands ==
- Arnold Lodge, Leicester
- Babington Hospital – Belper, Derbyshire
- Bassetlaw District General Hospital – Worksop, Nottinghamshire
- Berrywood Hospital, Northampton
- Buxton Hospital – Buxton, Derbyshire
- Cavendish Hospital – Buxton, Derbyshire
- Chesterfield Royal Hospital – Chesterfield
- Derbyshire Children's Hospital – Derby
- Florence Nightingale Community Hospital (formerly site of Derbyshire Royal Infirmary) – Derby
- Glenfield General Hospital – Glenfield, Leicestershire
- Grantham and District Hospital – Grantham, Lincolnshire
- Ilkeston Community Hospital – Ilkeston, Derbyshire
- John Coupland Hospital – Gainsborough, Lincolnshire
- Kettering General Hospital – Kettering, Northamptonshire
- King's Mill Hospital – Sutton-in-Ashfield, Nottinghamshire
- Leicester General Hospital – Leicester
- Leicester Royal Infirmary – Leicester
- Lincoln County Hospital – Lincoln, Lincolnshire
- County Hospital Louth – Louth, Lincolnshire
- Newark Hospital – Newark-on-Trent, Nottinghamshire
- Newholme Hospital – Bakewell, Derbyshire
- Northampton General Hospital – Northampton
- Nottingham City Hospital – Nottingham
- Nuffield Health Derby Hospital (independent) – Derby
- Pilgrim Hospital – Boston, Lincolnshire
- Queen's Medical Centre – Nottingham
- Rampton Secure Hospital – Woodbeck, Nottinghamshire
- Ripley Hospital – Ripley, Derbyshire
- Royal Derby Hospital (formerly Derby City General Hospital) – Derby
- St Andrew's Hospital (independent) – Northampton
- St Mary's Hospital – Kettering
- St Oswald's Hospital – Ashbourne, Derbyshire
- Whitworth Hospital – Matlock, Derbyshire

== East of England ==
- Addenbrooke's Hospital – Cambridge
- Aldeburgh Cottage Hospital – Aldeburgh, Suffolk
- Basildon University Hospital – Basildon, Essex
- Bedford Hospital – Bedford
- Braintree Community Hospital, Braintree, Essex
- Broomfield Hospital – Chelmsford
- Colchester Hospital – Colchester, Essex
- Cromer Hospital – Cromer, Norfolk
- Fulbourn Hospital, Fulbourn, Cambridgeshire
- Hellesdon Hospital – Norwich, Norfolk
- Hemel Hempstead Hospital – Hemel Hempstead, Hertfordshire
- Herts and Essex Hospital – Bishop's Stortford, Hertfordshire – community hospital
- Hertford County Hospital, Hertfordshire
- Hinchingbrooke Hospital – Huntingdon, Cambridgeshire
- Ipswich Hospital – Ipswich
- James Paget University Hospital – Gorleston, Great Yarmouth, Norfolk
- Kingsley Green, Hertfordshire
- Lister Hospital – Stevenage, Hertfordshire
- Luton and Dunstable University Hospital – Luton, Bedfordshire
- Norfolk and Norwich University Hospital – Norwich
- North Cambridgeshire Hospital – Wisbech
- Northgate Hospital, Great Yarmouth, Norfolk
- Norwich Community Hospital – Norwich
- Nuffield Health Cambridge Hospital (independent) – Cambridge
- Peterborough City Hospital – Peterborough, Cambridgeshire
- Princess Alexandra Hospital, Harlow – Harlow, Essex
- Princess of Wales Hospital – Ely, Cambridgeshire
- Queen Elizabeth Hospital – King's Lynn, Norfolk
- New QEII Hospital – Welwyn Garden City, Hertfordshire
- Rivers Hospital – Sawbridgeworth, Hertfordshire
- The Rosie Hospital – Cambridge
- Royal Papworth Hospital – Cambridgeshire
- St Albans City Hospital – St Albans, Hertfordshire
- St Andrew's Healthcare – Basildon, Essex
- St Margaret's Hospital, Epping – Epping, Essex
- St Peter's Hospital, Maldon, Essex
- Stamford and Rutland Hospital – Stamford, Lincolnshire
- Southend University Hospital – Westcliff-on-Sea, Essex
- Violet Hill Hospital – Stowmarket, Suffolk
- West Suffolk Hospital – Bury St Edmunds, Suffolk
- Watford General Hospital – Watford, Hertfordshire

== London ==
=== North central ===
- Barnet Hospital – Barnet
- Eastman Dental Hospital
- Nightingale Hospital – Marylebone (independent)
- Chase Farm Hospital – Enfield
- Coppetts Wood Hospital – Muswell Hill
- Gordon Hospital – Pimlico
- Great Ormond Street Hospital – Bloomsbury
- Hospital for Tropical Diseases
- London Lock Hospital
- St Lukes Hospital – Muswell Hill
- Hospital of St John and St Elizabeth – St John's Wood (independent)
- Middlesex Hospital
- North Middlesex University Hospital – Edmonton
- The Priory Hospital – Southgate (independent)
- Royal Free Hospital – Hampstead
- Royal London Hospital for Integrated Medicine
- St Ann's Hospital – Harringay
- St Pancras Hospital – St Pancras, London
- University College Hospital – Bloomsbury
- Wellington Hospital – St John's Wood (independent)
- Whittington Hospital – Highgate

=== East ===
- Claybury Hospital
- Goodmayes Hospital
- Harold Wood Hospital
- Homerton University Hospital – Homerton, London
- St Leonard's Hospital – Hackney, London
- King George Hospital – Redbridge
- Mile End Hospital – Tower Hamlets, Whitechapel
- Moorfields Eye Hospital – London Borough of Islington
- National Hospital for Neurology and Neurosurgery – Bloomsbury, London
- Newham University Hospital – Plaistow
- Oldchurch Hospital
- Queen Elizabeth Hospital for Children
- Queen's Hospital – Romford
- Royal London Hospital – Tower Hamlets, Whitechapel
- Royal National Throat, Nose and Ear Hospital – Gray's Inn Road, Camden
- Rush Green Hospital
- St Bartholomew's Hospital, Smithfield, London
- St George's Hospital – Havering
- Thorpe Coombe Hospital – Walthamstow
- Whipps Cross University Hospital – Leytonstone

=== North west ===
- Central Middlesex Hospital – Park Royal
- Ealing Hospital – Southall, Ealing
- Finchley Memorial Hospital
- Friern Hospital
- Fulham Hospital
- Hammersmith Hospital – Hammersmith & Fulham
- Harefield Hospital – Harefield
- Hillingdon Hospital – Uxbridge, Hillingdon
- Metropolitan Free Hospital
- Mount Vernon Hospital – Hillingdon
- Northwick Park Hospital – Brent
- Queen Charlotte's and Chelsea Hospital – Hammersmith & Fulham
- Royal National Orthopaedic Hospital – Stanmore
- St Bernard's Hospital – Southall
- St Mark's Hospital
- St Mary's Hospital – Paddington
- Western Eye Hospital – Marylebone

=== South east ===
- Beckenham Beacon – Beckenham
- Bethlem Royal Hospital – Beckenham
- Bexley Hospital, Bexleyheath
- Bromley Hospital
- Croydon University Hospital – Thornton Heath
- Dulwich Community Hospital
- Erith and District Hospital
- Evelina London Children's Hospital – Lambeth
- General Lying-In Hospital
- Greenwich District Hospital
- Guy's Hospital – Southwark
- King's College Hospital – Camberwell
- Lambeth Hospital – Stockwell
- London Bridge Hospital – London (independent)
- Maudsley Hospital – Camberwell
- Memorial Hospital, Woolwich – Woolwich
- Miller General Hospital
- Orpington Hospital – Orpington
- Princess Royal University Hospital – Farnborough
- Priory Hospital – Hayes Grove, Bromley (independent)
- Queen Elizabeth Hospital – Woolwich
- Queen Mary's Hospital – Sidcup
- St Alfege's Hospital
- St Thomas' Hospital – Lambeth
- University Hospital Lewisham – Lewisham

=== South west ===
- Banstead Hospital, Sutton
- Barnes Hospital, London
- Cassel Hospital
- Charing Cross Hospital – Hammersmith
- Chelsea and Westminster Hospital – Chelsea
- Cromwell Hospital – South Kensington (independent)
- King Edward VII's Hospital – Westminster
- Kingston Hospital – Kingston upon Thames
- Lister Hospital – Chelsea (independent)
- The London Clinic – Westminster (independent)
- Portland Hospital – Marylebone/Fitzrovia (independent)
- The Princess Grace Hospital – Marylebone (independent)
- Priory Hospital, Roehampton – Roehampton (independent)
- Queen Mary's Hospital – Roehampton
- Richmond Royal Hospital – Richmond
- Royal Brompton Hospital – Chelsea
- Royal Hospital Chelsea – Chelsea
- Royal Hospital for Neuro-disability – Putney
- Royal Marsden Hospital – Chelsea
- Royal Marsden Hospital – Belmont
- Springfield University Hospital – Tooting
- St Anthony's Hospital – Cheam (independent)
- St Charles' Hospital – Royal Borough of Kensington and Chelsea
- St George's Hospital – Tooting
- St Helier Hospital – Sutton
- St James' Hospital, Balham
- Teddington Memorial Hospital – Teddington
- Tolworth Hospital – Tolworth
- University College Hospital at Westmoreland Street – Marylebone
- West Middlesex University Hospital – Isleworth
- Wilson Hospital – Mitcham

== North East ==
=== County Durham ===
- Auckland Park Hospital – Bishop Auckland
- Bishop Auckland Hospital – Bishop Auckland
- Chester-le-Street Hospital – Chester-le-Street
- County Hospital – Durham
- Darlington Memorial Hospital – Darlington
- Lanchester Road Hospital – Durham
- Nuffield Health Tees Hospital (independent) – Stockton-on-Tees
- Priory Hospital, Middleton St George – Middleton St George
- Peterlee Community Hospital – Peterlee
- Shotley Bridge Hospital – Shotley Bridge
- University Hospital of Hartlepool – Hartlepool
- University Hospital of North Durham – Durham
- University Hospital of North Tees – Stockton-on-Tees
- West Park Hospital – Darlington

=== Northumberland ===
- Alnwick Community Hospital – Alnwick
- Berwick Infirmary – Berwick-upon-Tweed
- Blyth Community Hospital – Blyth
- Haltwhistle War Memorial Hospital – Haltwhistle
- Hexham General Hospital – Hexham
- Northumbria Specialist Emergency Care Hospital – Cramlington
- Rothbury Community Hospital – Rothbury
- St George's Park, Morpeth
- Wansbeck General Hospital – Ashington

=== North Yorkshire (part) ===
- The James Cook University Hospital – Middlesbrough
- Redcar Primary Care Hospital
- Roseberry Park Hospital – Middlesbrough

=== Tyne and Wear ===
- Great North Children's Hospital, Newcastle
- Sunderland Eye Infirmary – Sunderland
- Freeman Hospital – Newcastle upon Tyne
- Newcastle General Hospital – Newcastle upon Tyne
- Monkwearmouth Hospital – Sunderland
- North Tyneside General Hospital – North Shields
- Nuffield Health Newcastle-upon-Tyne Hospital (independent) – Newcastle upon Tyne
- Queen Elizabeth Hospital – Gateshead
- Royal Victoria Infirmary – Newcastle upon Tyne
- Sanderson Hospital, Newcastle
- St Nicholas Hospital – Gosforth
- Sir G B Hunter Memorial Hospital – Wallsend
- South Tyneside District Hospital – South Shields
- Sunderland Royal Hospital – Sunderland

== North West ==
=== Cheshire ===
- Countess of Chester Hospital – Chester, Cheshire
- Halton General Hospital – Runcorn
- Leighton Hospital – Crewe
- Macclesfield District General Hospital – Macclesfield
- Spire Cheshire Hospital (independent) – Warrington
- Victoria Infirmary, Northwich, Cheshire
- Warrington Hospital – Warrington

=== Cumbria ===
- Cumberland Infirmary – Carlisle
- Furness General Hospital – Barrow-in-Furness
- West Cumberland Hospital – Whitehaven
- Westmorland General Hospital – Kendal

=== Greater Manchester ===
- Alexandra Hospital – Cheadle, Greater Manchester
- Atherleigh Park Hospital – Leigh, Greater Manchester
- Altrincham Hospital – Altrincham
- Barnes Hospital – Cheadle
- Billinge Hospital – Wigan
- Cheadle Royal Hospital
- Christie Hospital, Manchester
- Fairfield General Hospital – Bury
- Leigh Infirmary – Leigh
- Manchester Royal Eye Hospital – Manchester
- Manchester Royal Infirmary – Manchester
- North Manchester General Hospital – Manchester
- Prestwich Hospital – Bury, Greater Manchester
- Rochdale Infirmary
- Royal Albert Edward Infirmary – Wigan
- Royal Bolton Hospital – Farnworth, near Bolton
- Royal Manchester Children's Hospital
- Royal Oldham Hospital – Oldham
- Salford Royal Hospital – Salford
- Saint Mary's Hospital, Manchester – Manchester
- Stepping Hill Hospital – Stockport
- Tameside General Hospital – Ashton-under-Lyne
- Trafford General Hospital – Davyhulme, Manchester – formerly Park Hospital
- University Dental Hospital of Manchester
- Withington Hospital – Manchester
- Wrightington Hospital – Wrightington
- Wythenshawe Hospital – Manchester

=== Lancashire ===
- Blackpool Victoria Hospital – Blackpool
- Burnley General Teaching Hospital – Burnley
- Calderstones Hospital, Whalley
- Chorley and South Ribble Hospital – Chorley
- Lytham Hospital – Lytham
- Ormskirk District General Hospital, Ormskirk
- Pendle Community Hospital, Nelson
- Queen Victoria Hospital – Morecambe
- Royal Blackburn Teaching Hospital – Blackburn
- Royal Lancaster Infirmary – Lancaster
- Royal Preston Hospital – Preston
- The Harbour – Blackpool

=== Merseyside ===
- Aintree University Hospital – Liverpool
- Arrowe Park Hospital – Wirral
- Ashworth Hospital
- Alder Hey Children's Hospital – Liverpool
- Broadgreen Hospital – Liverpool
- Clatterbridge Cancer Centre
- Clatterbridge Hospital – Wirral
- Liverpool Heart and Chest Hospital – Liverpool
- Liverpool Women's Hospital – Liverpool
- Newton Community Hospital – Merseyside
- Royal Liverpool University Hospital – Liverpool
- Southport and Formby District General Hospital, Kew, Southport
- St Catherine's Health Centre, Merseyside
- St Helens Hospital – Merseyside
- The Walton Centre for Neurology and Neurosurgery – Liverpool
- Whiston Hospital – Merseyside
- Wirral Women and Children's Hospital

== South East ==
- Arundel and District Hospital, West Sussex
- Ashford Hospital – Ashford, Surrey
- Bexhill Hospital – Bexhill-on-Sea, East Sussex
- Bexley Hospital, Kent
- Bognor Regis War Memorial Hospital, West Sussex
- Brighton General Hospital – Brighton
- Buckland Hospital – Dover
- Conquest Hospital – Hastings, East Sussex
- Crawley Hospital – Crawley, West Sussex
- Darent Valley Hospital – Dartford, Kent
- Eastbourne District General Hospital – Eastbourne, East Sussex
- East Surrey Hospital – Redhill, Surrey
- Epsom Cottage Hospital, Surrey
- Epsom Hospital – Epsom
- Farnham Hospital, Surrey
- Farnham Road Hospital, Surrey
- Frimley Park Hospital – Frimley, Surrey
- The Horder Centre – Crowborough, East Sussex
- Horsham Hospital – Horsham, West Sussex
- Kent and Canterbury Hospital – Canterbury, Kent
- KIMS Hospital – Maidstone, Kent
- Lewes Victoria Hospital – Lewes, East Sussex
- The McIndoe Centre – East Grinstead, Kent
- Maidstone Hospital – Maidstone, Kent
- Medway Maritime Hospital – Medway, Kent
- Milford Hospital, Surrey
- The Montefiore Hospital – Hove, East Sussex
- Nuffield Health Brighton Hospital (independent) – Brighton
- Nuffield Health Woking Hospital – Woking
- Princess Royal Hospital – Haywards Heath, West Sussex
- Queen Elizabeth The Queen Mother Hospital – Margate, Kent
- Queen Victoria Hospital – East Grinstead, West Sussex
- Royal Sussex County Hospital – Brighton
- Royal Alexandra Children's Hospital – Brighton
- Royal Surrey County Hospital – Guildford, Surrey
- Royal Victoria Hospital – Folkestone, Kent
- Southlands Hospital – Shoreham-by-Sea, West Sussex
- Spire Alexandra Hospital (independent) – Chatham, Kent
- Spire Clare Park Hospital (independent) – Farnham, Surrey
- Spire Gatwick Park Hospital (independent) – Horley, Surrey
- Spire Sussex Hospital (independent) – St Leonards-on-sea, East Sussex
- Spire Tunbridge Wells (independent) – Tunbridge Wells, Kent
- St Ebba's Hospital, Surrey
- St Martin's Hospital, Canterbury, Kent
- St Peter's Hospital – Chertsey, Surrey
- St Richard's Hospital – Chichester, West Sussex
- Tunbridge Wells Hospital
- William Harvey Hospital – Ashford, Kent
- Worthing Hospital – Worthing, West Sussex

== South Central ==
- Amersham Hospital – Amersham, Buckinghamshire
- Andover War Memorial Hospital – Andover, Hampshire
- Basingstoke and North Hampshire Hospital – Basingstoke, Hampshire
- Broadmoor Hospital – Crowthorne, Berkshire
- Churchill Hospital – Oxford
- Fareham Community Hospital – Locksheath, Fareham, Southampton
- Fordingbridge Hospital – Fordingbridge, Hants
- Gosport War Memorial Hospital – Gosport, Hampshire
- Heatherwood Hospital – Ascot, Berkshire
- Horton General Hospital – Banbury, Oxfordshire
- John Radcliffe Hospital – Oxford
- Lymington New Forest Hospital – Lymington
- Moorgreen Hospital – West End, Hampshire
- Milton Keynes University Hospital – Milton Keynes
- Netley Hospital – Netley, Hampshire
- New Hall Hospital (independent) – Salisbury
- Nuffield Orthopaedic Centre – Oxford
- Nuffield Health Wessex Hospital (independent) – Chandler's Ford
- Oxford Clinic for Specialist Surgery (independent) – Oxford
- Petersfield Hospital – Petersfield, Hampshire
- Princess Anne Hospital – Southampton
- Queen Alexandra Hospital – Portsmouth, Hampshire
- Romsey Community Hospital – Romsey
- Royal Berkshire Hospital – Reading, Berkshire
- Royal Buckinghamshire Hospital – Aylesbury, Buckinghamshire
- Royal Hampshire County Hospital – Winchester
- Royal South Hants Hospital – Southampton. Hampshire
- Roundway Hospital – Devizes, Wiltshire
- Southampton General Hospital – Southampton
- Spire Portsmouth Hospital (independent) – Havant, Hampshire
- Spire Southampton Hospital (independent) – Southampton, Hampshire
- Stoke Mandeville Hospital – Aylesbury, Buckinghamshire
- St James' Hospital – Portsmouth, Hampshire
- St Mary's Hospital – Isle of Wight
- St Mary's Hospital – Portsmouth, Hampshire
- Tatchbury Mount Hospital – Totton
- Warneford Hospital – Oxford
- West Berkshire Community Hospital – Thatcham
- Western Community Hospital – Southampton
- Wexham Park Hospital – Wexham, Slough, Berkshire
- Wycombe Hospital – High Wycombe, Buckinghamshire

== South West ==
- Alderney Hospital – Poole, Dorset
- Blackberry Hill Hospital – Bristol
- Bodmin Hospital – Bodmin, Cornwall
- BMI The Winterbourne Hospital (Independent) – Dorchester, Dorset
- Bristol Eye Hospital – Bristol
- Bristol Royal Hospital for Children – Bristol
- Bristol Royal Infirmary – Bristol
- Brookland Hall, Bristol
- Callington Road Hospital, Bristol
- Camborne Redruth Community Hospital – Illogan Highway, Cornwall
- Cheltenham General Hospital – Cheltenham, Gloucestershire
- Cheltenham Nuffield Hospital (independent) – Cheltenham, Gloucestershire
- Chepstow Community Hospital, Paulton
- Chippenham Community Hospital, Wilts
- Christchurch Hospital – Christchurch, Dorset
- Cossham Memorial Hospital – Bristol
- Derriford Hospital – Plymouth, Devon
- Duchy Hospital (independent) – Truro, Cornwall
- Dorset County Hospital – Dorchester, Dorset
- Edward Hain Hospital – St Ives, Cornwall
- Fountain Way – Salisbury, Wiltshire
- Frenchay Hospital – Frenchay, Gloucestershire
- Gloucestershire Royal Hospital – Gloucester, Gloucestershire
- Great Western Hospital – Swindon, Wiltshire
- Green Lane Hospital – Devizes, Wiltshire
- Helston Community Hospital – Helston, Cornwall
- Melksham Community Hospital
- Musgrove Park Hospital – Taunton, Somerset
- Newton Abbot Community Hospital – Newton Abbot, Devon
- North Devon District Hospital – Barnstaple, Devon
- North Somerset Community Hospital, Clevedon, Somerset
- Nuffield Hospital – Taunton (independent)
- Nuffield Hospital – Bristol (independent)
- Paulton Memorial Hospital – Paulton, Somerset
- Petherton Resource Centre, Bristol
- Poole Hospital – Poole, Dorset
- Practice plus group, Emersons Green, Bristol (independent)
- Royal Bournemouth Hospital – Bournemouth, Dorset
- Royal Cornwall Hospital – Truro, Cornwall
- Royal Devon and Exeter Hospital – Exeter, Devon
- Royal National Hospital for Rheumatic Diseases – Bath, Somerset
- Royal United Hospital – Bath, Somerset
- Royal Victoria Hospital – Bournemouth, Dorset
- South Bristol Community Hospital – Bristol
- St Ann's Hospital – Poole, Dorset
- St Austell Community Hospital – St Austell, Cornwall
- St Leonard's Hospital – Ferndown, Dorset
- St Michael's Hospital, Bath
- St Michael's Hospital – Bristol
- St Michael's Hospital – Hayle, Cornwall
- Salisbury District Hospital – Salisbury, Wiltshire
- South Hams Hospital – Kingsbridge, Devon
- Southmead Hospital – Bristol
- South Bristol Community Hospital – Bristol
- Spire Bristol Hospital – Bristol (independent)
- Stroud General Hospital – Stroud, Gloucestershire
- Sulis Hospital Bath (Independent)
- Tiverton and District Hospital – Tiverton, Devon
- Torbay Hospital – Torquay, Devon
- Thornbury hospital, Bristol
- Totnes Community Hospital – Totnes, Devon
- University of Bristol Dental Hospital – Bristol
- Vale Community Hospital – Dursley, Gloucestershire
- Wellesley Hospital – Wellington, Somerset
- Weston General Hospital – Weston-super-Mare, Somerset
- West Cornwall Hospital – Penzance, Cornwall
- Westminster Memorial Hospital – Shaftesbury, Dorset
- Yeovil Hospital – Yeovil, Somerset

== West Midlands ==
- Alexandra Hospital – Redditch
- Birmingham Children's Hospital – Birmingham
- Birmingham Dental Hospital – Birmingham
- Birmingham Nuffield Hospital (independent) – Edgbaston, Birmingham
- Birmingham Women's Hospital – Edgbaston, Birmingham
- Bushey Fields Hospital, Dudley
- BMI The Meriden Hospital – Coventry
- Cannock Chase Hospital – Cannock
- City Hospital, Birmingham – Birmingham
- The (BMI) Edgbaston Hospital (independent) – Birmingham
- Corbett Hospital, Dudley
- Ellen Badger Hospital – Shipston-on-Stour
- George Eliot Hospital – Nuneaton
- Good Hope Hospital – Sutton Coldfield, Birmingham
- Guest Hospital – Dudley
- Harplands Hospital – Stoke-on-Trent
- Heartlands Hospital – Birmingham
- Hereford County Hospital – Hereford
- Kidderminster Hospital – Kidderminster
- Leamington Spa Hospital – Leamington Spa
- Ludlow Hospital – Shropshire
- Midland Metropolitan University Hospital – Birmingham
- Moseley Hall Hospital – Moseley, Birmingham
- New Cross Hospital – Wolverhampton
- Nuffield Health Warwickshire Hospital (independent) – Leamington Spa
- Nuffield Health Shrewsbury Hospital (independent) – Shrewsbury
- Princess Royal Hospital – Telford
- The (BMI) Priory Hospital (independent) – Birmingham
- Queen Elizabeth Hospital Birmingham – Edgbaston, Birmingham
- Queen's Hospital – Burton upon Trent
- Robert Jones and Agnes Hunt Orthopaedic Hospital – Oswestry
- Rowley Regis Hospital – Rowley Regis
- Royal Orthopaedic Hospital – Northfield, Birmingham
- Royal Shrewsbury Hospital – Shrewsbury
- Royal Stoke University Hospital – Stoke-on-Trent
- Russells Hall Hospital – Dudley
- Sandwell General Hospital – Sandwell
- Selly Oak Hospital – Birmingham
- Spire Parkway Hospital (independent) – Solihull
- Hospital of St Cross, Rugby – Warwickshire
- St Michael's Hospital, Warwick – Warwickshire
- Solihull Hospital – Solihull
- County Hospital – Stafford
- Stratford Hospital – Stratford-upon-Avon
- Tenbury Community Hospital – Tenbury Wells
- University Hospital Coventry – Coventry
- Walsall Manor Hospital – Walsall
- Warwick Hospital – Warwick
- West Heath Hospital – Birmingham
- The Woodbourne Priory (independent) – Birmingham
- Worcestershire Royal Hospital – Worcester

== Yorkshire and the Humber ==
=== East Riding of Yorkshire ===
- Alfred Bean Hospital – Driffield
- Bridlington Hospital – Bridlington
- Castle Hill Hospital – Cottingham
- East Riding Community Hospital – Beverley
- Goole and District Hospital – Goole
- Hornsea Cottage Hospital – Hornsea
- Hull and East Riding Hospital – Anlaby
- Hull Royal Infirmary – Hull
- Withernsea Community Hospital – Withernsea

=== Lincolnshire (part) ===
- Diana, Princess of Wales Hospital – Grimsby, North East Lincolnshire
- St Hugh's Hospital – Grimsby, North East Lincolnshire
- Scunthorpe General Hospital – Scunthorpe, North Lincolnshire

=== North Yorkshire (part) ===
- BMI The Duchy Hospital, Harrogate
- Castleberg Hospital – Giggleswick
- Friarage Hospital – Northallerton
- Friary Community Hospital – Richmond
- Harrogate District Hospital – Harrogate
- Malton Community Hospital – Malton
- The Retreat – York
- Ripon Community Hospital – Ripon
- Scarborough Hospital – Scarborough
- Skipton General Hospital – Skipton
- Whitby Hospital – Whitby
- York Hospital – York

=== South Yorkshire ===
- Barnsley Hospital – Barnsley
- Charles Clifford Dental Hospital – Sheffield
- Claremont Hospital (independent) – Sheffield
- Doncaster Royal Infirmary – Doncaster
- Kendray Hospital – Barnsley
- Montagu Hospital – Mexborough
- Northern General Hospital – Sheffield
- Park Hill Hospital (independent) – Doncaster
- Rotherham General Hospital – Rotherham
- Royal Hallamshire Hospital – Sheffield
- Sheffield Children's Hospital – Sheffield
- Thornbury Hospital (independent) – Sheffield
- Tickhill Road Hospital, Doncaster
- Weston Park Hospital – Sheffield

=== West Yorkshire ===
- Airedale General Hospital – Keighley
- Bradford Royal Infirmary – Bradford
- Calderdale Royal Hospital – Halifax
- Chapel Allerton Hospital – Leeds
- Dewsbury and District Hospital – Dewsbury
- Fieldhead Hospital – Wakefield
- Leeds Dental Institute – Leeds
- Leeds General Infirmary – Leeds
- Lynfield Mount Hospital – Bradford
- Huddersfield Royal Infirmary – Huddersfield
- Spire Methley Park Hospital (independent) – Methley
- Nuffield Health Leeds Hospital (independent) – Leeds
- Pinderfields Hospital – Wakefield
- Pontefract Hospital – Pontefract
- St James's University Hospital – Leeds
- St Luke's Hospital, Bradford – Bradford
- Seacroft Hospital – Leeds
- Wharfedale Hospital – Otley
