= St Luke's Hospital, Middlesbrough =

- Tees, Esk and Wear Valleys NHS Foundation Trust
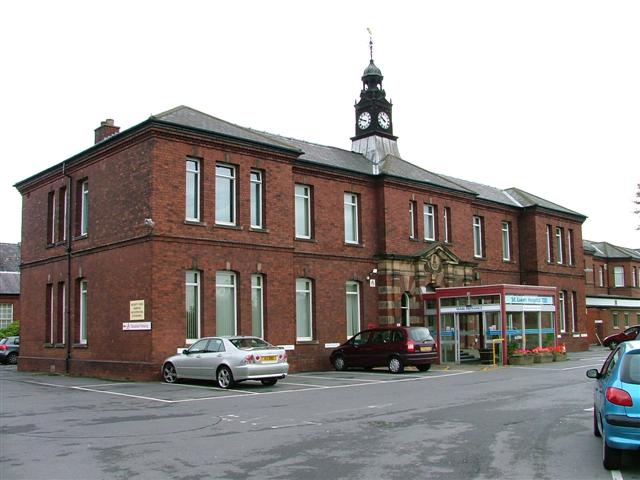
- St Luke's Hospital

- Shown in North Yorkshire

Geography
- Location: Middlesbrough, North Yorkshire, England
- Coordinates: 54.553°N 1.213°W

Organisation
- Care system: NHS
- Type: Mental Health

Services
- Emergency department: No

History
- Founded: 1893
- Closed: 2010

St Luke's Hospital was a psychiatric hospital in Middlesbrough, North Yorkshire, England. It was managed by Tees, Esk and Wear Valleys NHS Foundation Trust.

== History ==
The facility, which initially absorbed patients from the aging North Riding Asylum in York, was designed by Charles Henry Howell using a compact arrow layout. It opened as the Middlesbrough Borough Asylum in June 1898. It joined the National Health Service as St Luke's Hospital in 1948.

In 1980, the South Cleveland Hospital was built on parkland adjacent to St Luke's Hospital.

In November 1980 the regional medium-secure psychiatric unit was established in a modern building to the rear of the hospital called the Hutton Centre.

St Luke's was demolished in 2010 to make way for the new Roseberry Park Hospital.

== See also ==
- List of hospitals in England
