= Roger Kirby (surgeon) =

Roger Kirby (7 June 1939 - 26 November 2008) was a British surgeon at the University Hospital of Hartlepool, who in 1992 was part of the team that carried out one of the first keyhole gallbladder removals in that district.
