= North Tees and Hartlepool NHS Foundation Trust =

- Type: NHS hospital trust
- Region served: South east County Durham
- Establishments: University Hospital of North Tees; University Hospital of Hartlepool; Peterlee Community Hospital
- Website: www.nth.nhs.uk

North Tees and Hartlepool NHS Foundation Trust runs the University Hospital of North Tees (Stockton-on-Tees), the University Hospital of Hartlepool and Peterlee Community Hospital all three in County Durham, England.

Proposals for reconfiguring hospitals in the area have been under consideration since the early 1990s. A proposal to replace both existing hospitals with a new building at Wynyard is still under active consideration. and services are being transferred between sites. In October 2013 all emergency medical and critical care services were moved from Hartlepool (formerly Hartlepool General Hospital) to the University Hospital of North Tees (formerly North Tees General Hospital), in Stockton. The services remaining in Hartlepool are being concentrated in the central building. The plans were suspended in October 2014 because of a lack of "high-level political support" ahead of May's general election. Former Stockton South MP James Wharton opposed the plans for the new hospital, arguing that £50m should be invested in North Tees. The Hartlepool Mail is campaigning to have services restored to the University Hospital of Hartlepool.

In July 2019 a merger with South Tees Hospitals NHS Foundation Trust was being discussed. In 2022 five of the six non-executive directors resigned over the proposals for a shared chief executive post between the trusts.

The trust has a £40 million maintenance backlog. A ward at University Hospital Hartlepool was damaged by Storm Ciara and had to be closed. The trust's hospitals have between 15 and 20 years before they reach their "end of life".

== Performance ==
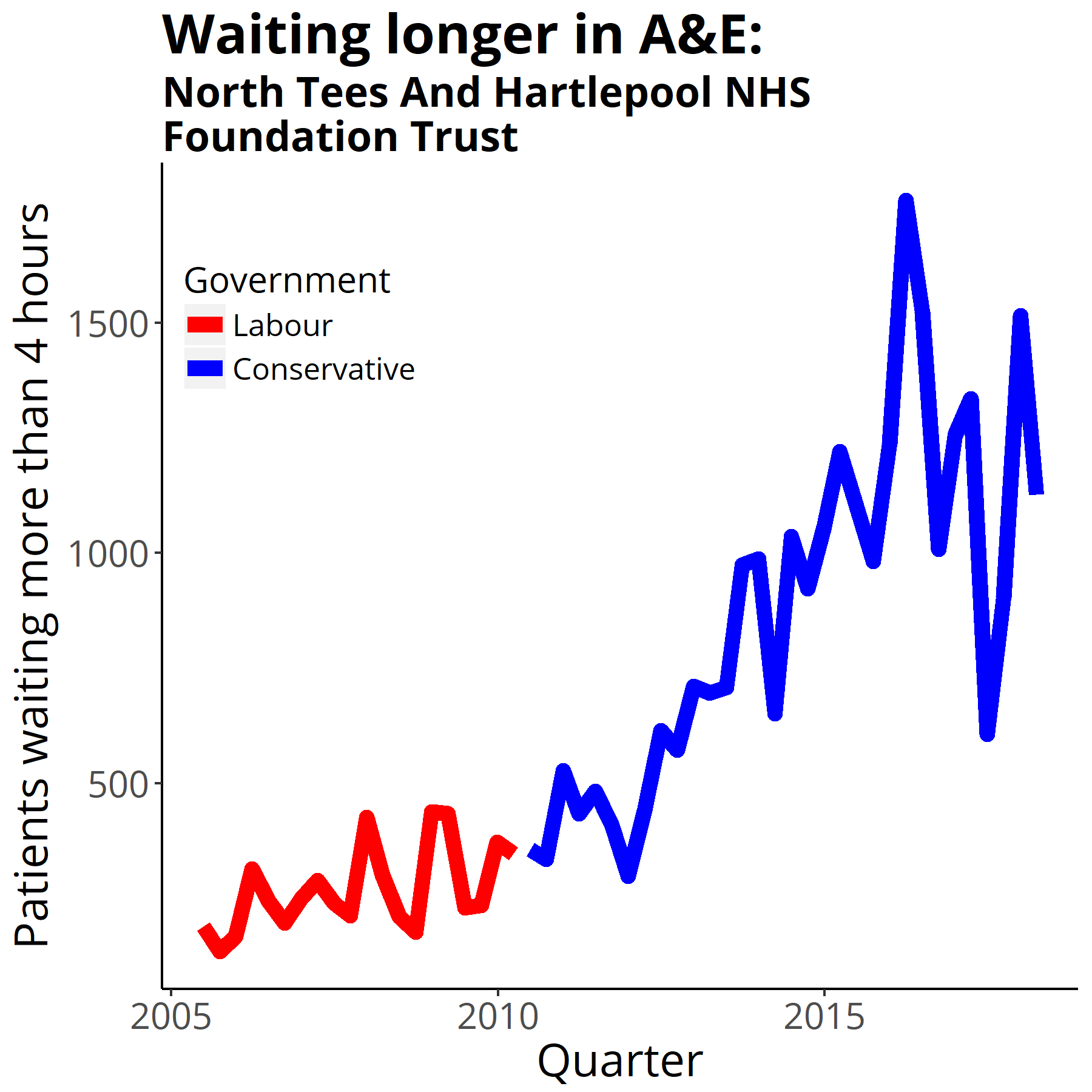
Four-hour target in the emergency department quarterly figures from NHS England Data from https://www.england.nhs.uk/statistics/statistical-work-areas/ae-waiting-times-and-activity/

In December 2013 the Trust was one of thirteen hospital trusts named by Dr Foster Intelligence as having higher than expected higher mortality indicator scores for the period April 2012 to March 2013 in their Hospital Guide 2013.

== See also ==
- List of NHS trusts
- South Tees Hospitals NHS Foundation Trust
- Tees, Esk and Wear Valleys NHS Foundation Trust
