= Norfolk and Suffolk NHS Foundation Trust =

- Type: NHS trust
- Hospitals: Hellesdon Hospital
- Chair: Zoë Billingham
- Chief executive: Stuart Richardson
- Staff: 4,500
- Website: www.nsft.nhs.uk

Norfolk and Suffolk NHS Foundation Trust (NSFT) is a large mental health trust and an NHS Foundation Trust. It runs services in Norfolk and Suffolk, England, chiefly at Hellesdon Hospital, Northside House and Julian Hospital in Norwich, Northgate in Great Yarmouth, and Carlton Court in Lowestoft.

It was formed by a merger of Norfolk and Waveney Mental Health NHS Foundation Trust with Suffolk Mental Health Partnership NHS Trust on 1 January 2012.

Stuart Richardson was appointed Chief Executive Officer in 2021.

== Performance ==
In November 2013 a campaign to save mental health services in Norfolk and Suffolk alleged that inpatient and community services are in "acute crisis" because of cutbacks. The staff group claimed they were finding it "almost impossible to function in a safe and legal manner". "hundreds of people packed into a room at the Vauxhall Centre in Norwich" on 25 November 2013 for the first meeting of the Campaign to Save Mental Health Services in Norfolk and Suffolk at which it was alleged that deaths of service users were increasing.

In October 2014 Norfolk County Council ended the formal agreement with the trust established in 2008 after losing confidence in its capacity to guarantee outcomes for social care service users. About 100 social care staff and the management of the service will transfer to the Council.

In February 2015 the Trust was put into special measures after the Care Quality Commission reported the trust was "not a safe... service". It was subsequently partnered by Nottinghamshire Healthcare NHS Foundation Trust. It came out of special measures in October 2016 but was back in again in October 2017 after a further inspection found it had "not maintained standards".

The Norfolk and Suffolk NHS foundation trust closed 35 beds, 8 permanently, in the months up to August 2018 due to staff shortages.

The Care Quality Commission has rated Norfolk and Suffolk NHS Foundation Trust inadequate four times up to April 2022. They noted patients self harmed or attempt suicide while waiting for care. There are unsafe acute wards and there is serious understaffing. According to the Care Quality Commission bosses repeatedly did not protect patients. Inspectors found patients in segregation unsupervised, urgent referrals unsafely downgraded, unfilled shifts causing 139 incidents over six months. Dr Paul Lelliott of the Care Quality Commission said, "Managers have not ensured that when things go wrong, they learn and share lessons to reduce the likelihood of the same thing happening again." Lelliot added that matters raised in 2014 still needed to be fully addressed, he said, "The trust leadership team has not taken action at the pace required to bring about sustained improvement and to resolve failings in safety." There are calls for the trust to be put into special administration meaning part of all the trust would be taken over, many mental health experts and campaigners believe that is the only way to make the trust safe. Patients with significant needs did not always get a service. In April 2022 the CQC said it had found widespread deterioration in the quality and safety of services, particularly in the inpatient ward for children and young people.

In August 2020 140 of the medical staff signed a letter claiming that the trust's "clinical services are unable to provide good basic care and are unsafe" and saying that they did not have confidence in the board's ability to resolve its longstanding problems.

On 21 January 2024 an article was published in The Guardian newspaper (UK) discussing the report by consultancy firm Grant Thornton that found that there were 8,400 unexpected deaths between April 2019 and October 2022 of people who were under the care of the Trust, or had been under its care up to six months prior to their deaths.

== Development ==
The trust was one of the beneficiaries of Boris Johnson's announcement of capital funding for the NHS in August 2019, with an allocation of £40 million for four new hospital wards providing 80 beds.

== See also ==
- List of hospitals in England
- List of NHS trusts
- Healthcare in Suffolk
