= Wilson Hospital =

- South West London and St George's Mental Health NHS Trust
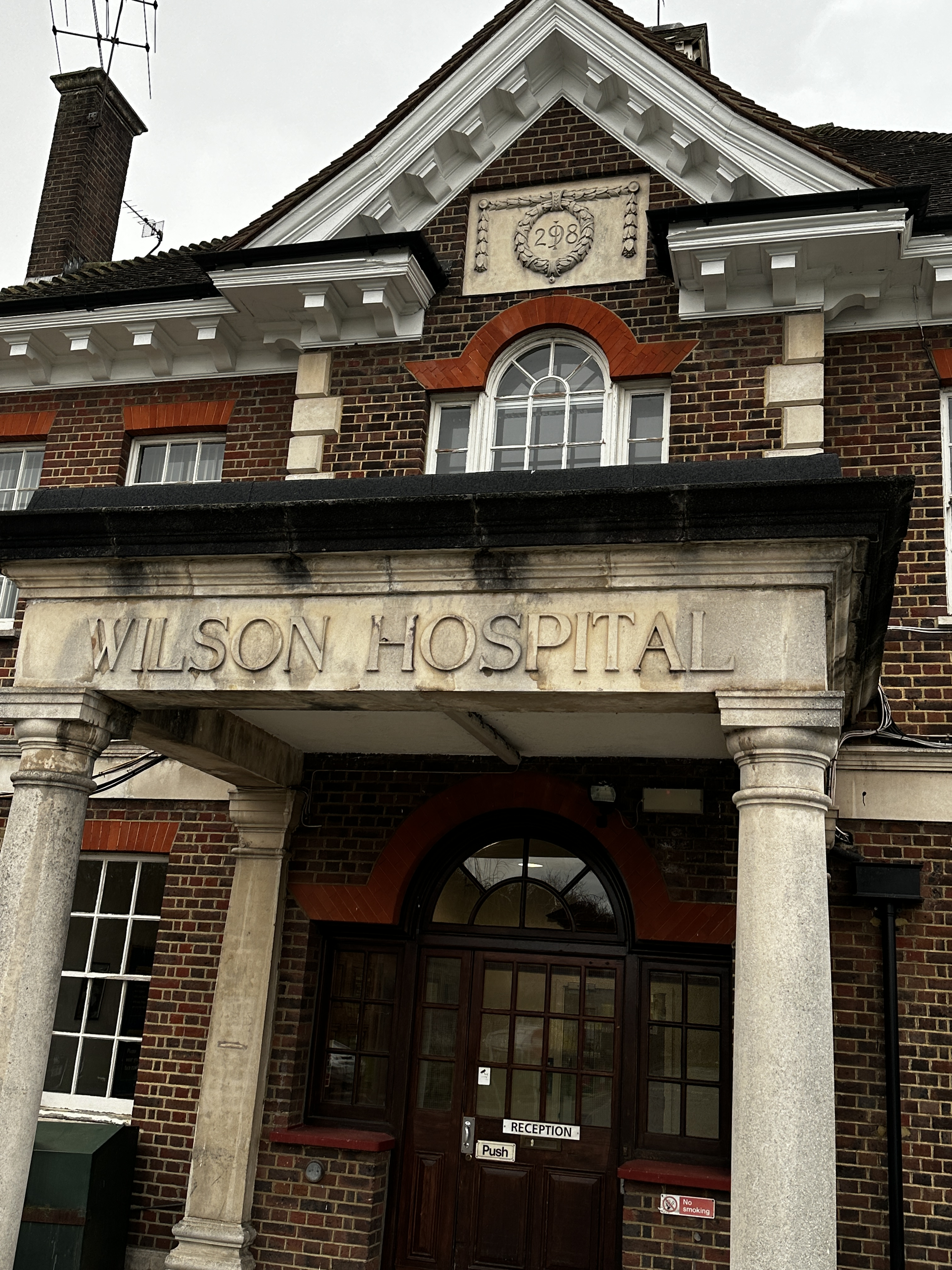
- Wilson Hospital

- Location within Merton

Geography
- Location: Cranmer Road, Mitcham, London, London, England, United Kingdom
- Coordinates: 51.3974°N 0.1631°W

Organisation
- Care system: NHS England
- Type: Mental health

Services
- Emergency department: No Accident & Emergency

Links
- Website: www.swlstg.nhs.uk
- Lists: Hospitals in England

Wilson Hospital is a small hospital in Cranmer Road, Mitcham, London. South West London and St George's Mental Health NHS Trust provides mental health services from the Wilson Hospital. Other community services are provided at the Wilson hospital by other providers.

== History ==
The facility, which was financed by a gift from Sir Isaac Wilson (1862-1944), a local developer, was opened by the Princess Royal as the Wilson Cottage Hospital in 1928. After one ward was destroyed by a V-1 flying bomb in 1944 during the Second World War, it joined the National Health Service as the Wilson Hospital in 1948. Proposals to redevelop the hospital as a health centre were announced in 2017.
