= Richmond Royal Hospital =

- South West London and St George's Mental Health NHS Trust
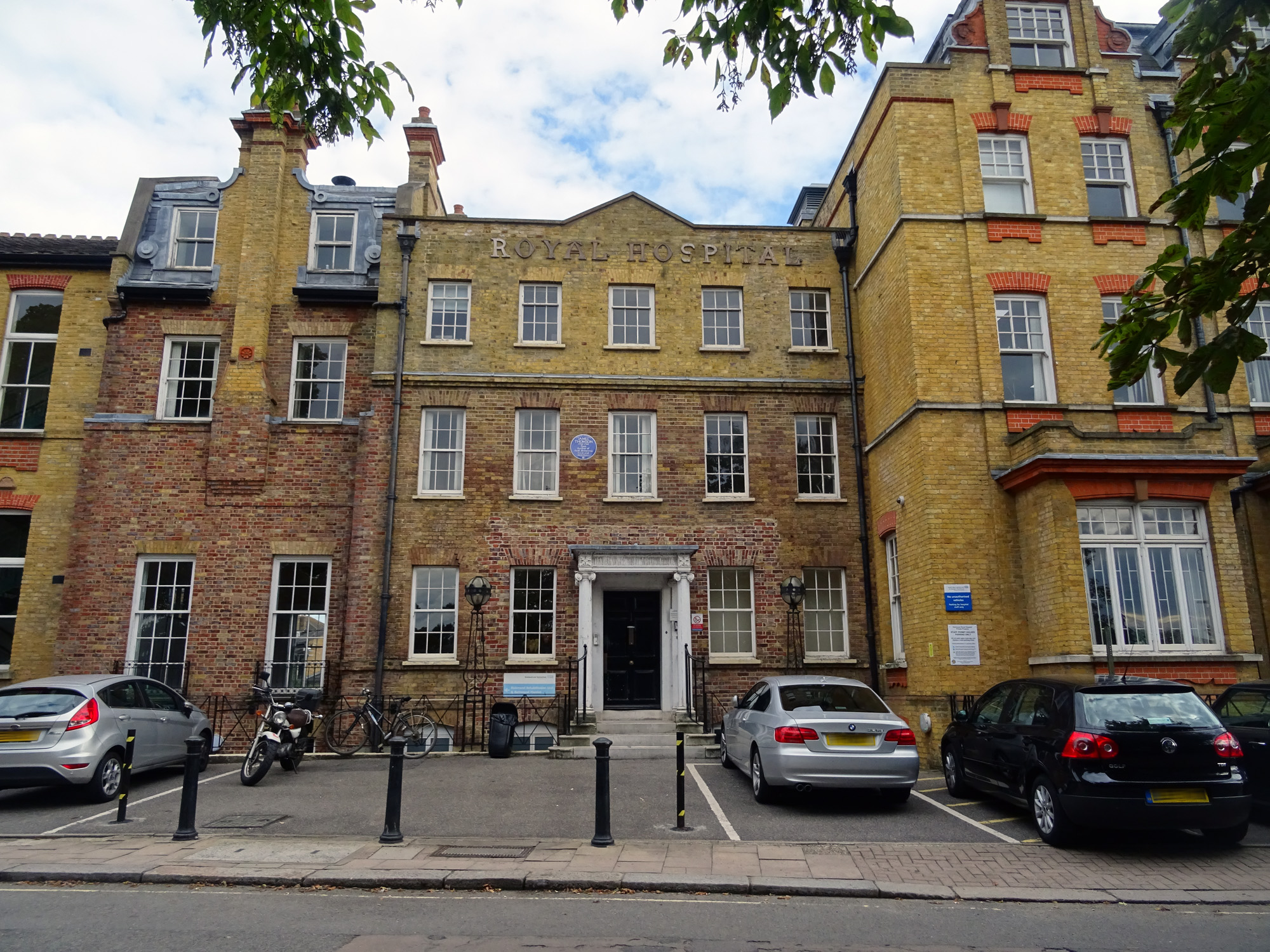

- Shown in Richmond upon Thames

Geography
- Location: Richmond, London, England
- Coordinates: 51°28′0.3″N 0°18′1.2″W

Organisation
- Care system: NHS England
- Type: Specialist

Services
- Speciality: Mental health facility

History
- Founded: Building c. 1750; Hospital 1868

Links
- Lists: Hospitals in England

Listed Building – Grade II
- Official name: Original Block of Richmond Royal Hospital
- Designated: 25 June 1983
- Reference no.: 1193875

Richmond Royal Hospital, on Kew Foot Road in Richmond, London, England, is a mental health facility operated by South West London and St George's Mental Health NHS Trust, which has its headquarters at Springfield Hospital in Tooting. The hospital's original block is Grade II listed.

== History ==
The original hospital block is a mid-18th century brown brick house with a Roman Ionic porch. It was the home of the poet James Thomson (1700–1748), who lived there from 1736 until his death. The site is marked by a blue plaque. Thomson wrote his most famous works there including the masque Alfred, which includes the poem "Rule, Britannia" (1740), "The Castle of Indolence" (1748) and "The Seasons" (1738). His poem "Rule, Britannia" was set to music by Thomas Arne in 1740 and became a patriotic song. There is a memorial to him in Richmond Park.

After Thomson's death the house was bought by a friend, George Ross, who enlarged it and gave it the name Rossdale Cottage. Over the years the name was altered slightly to Rosedale Cottage. In 1786 it was sold to the widow of Admiral Edward Boscawen. After she died in 1805 it was bought by Charles Talbot, the 15th Earl of Shrewsbury, who changed the name to Shrewsbury House.

In February 1868 it was opened as a hospital, by the Earl and Countess Russell. Additions were made to the building in 1896; the architects were Smith and Brewer. After Queen Victoria became the patron of the hospital, it became the Royal Hospital, Richmond in 1895. Princess May's Ward for Children was opened by the Duke and Duchess of York (the future King George V and Queen Mary) in July 1896. As Prince and Princess of Wales they returned to the hospital in April 1907 to open the Swan Memorial Ophthalmic Wing.

The hospital joined the National Health Service in 1948. The rehabilitation unit on Evelyn Road, behind the main building, was built in 1980: the architects were Hutchison, Locke and Monk. It was deemed unsuitable for modern healthcare and was sold in 2018, although new healthcare facilities are being built on site.

== Notable staff ==
- Rachel Foley (1857–1934), Matron 1890–1908. Foley trained at The London Hospital under Eva Luckes between 1880 and 1882. she held the post of head nurse at Richmond from 1882, until her promotion to matron in 1890. During her matronship the hospital was expanded and included the Cambridge Wing and a new outpatients department.
