= Hull and East Riding Hospital =

NHS hospital in Yorkshire, England

- Spire Healthcare
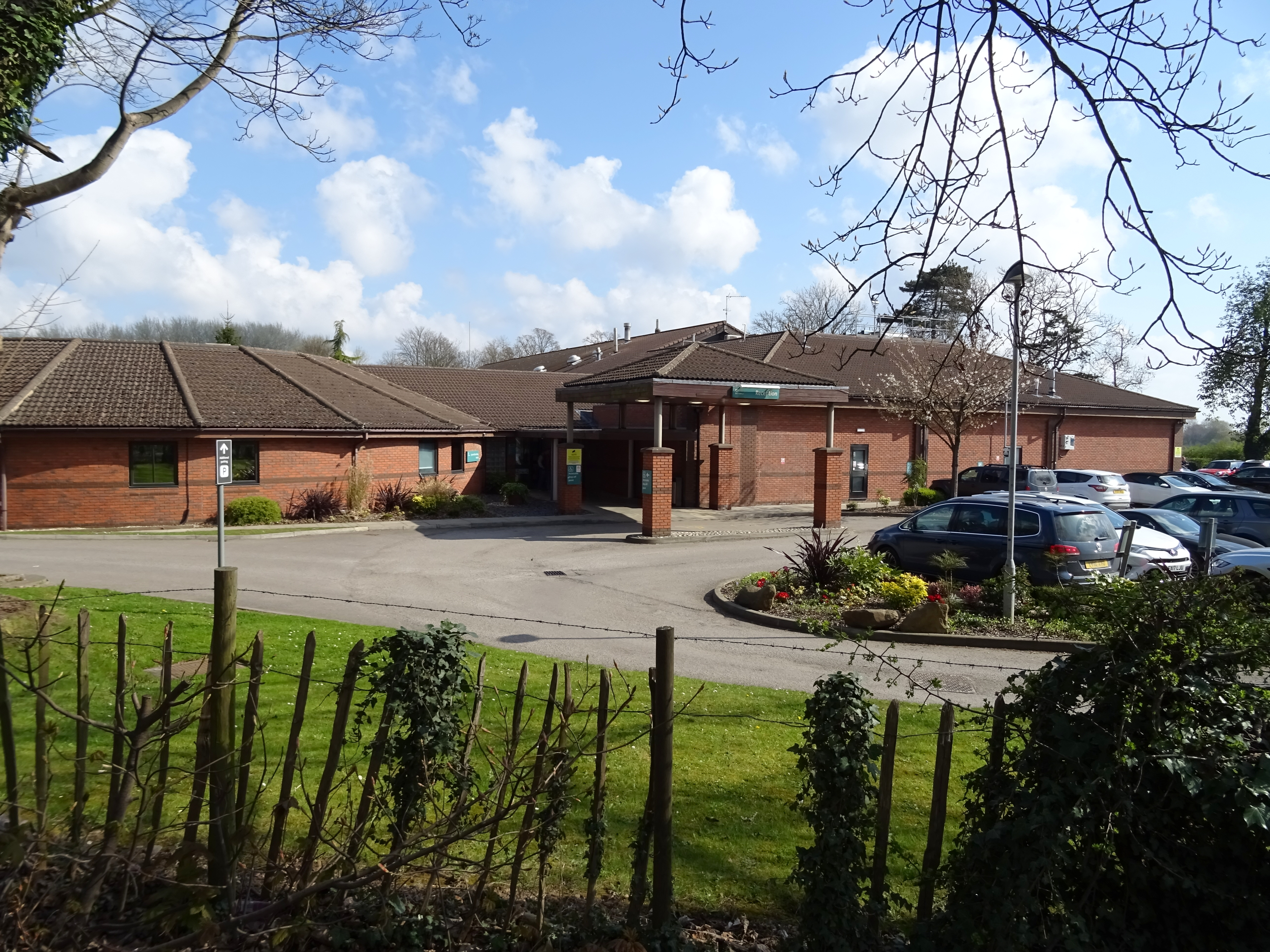
- Entrance to Spire Hull and East Riding Hospital

- Shown in the East Riding of Yorkshire

Geography
- Location: Anlaby, East Riding of Yorkshire, England
- Coordinates: 53.739381°N 0.435098°W

Services
- Emergency department: No

History
- Founded: 1986

Links
- Lists: Hospitals in England

Hull and East Riding Hospital, formerly BUPA Hospital Hull and East Riding is located in Anlaby, East Riding of Yorkshire, England. It is owned by Spire Healthcare.

== History ==
The hospital opened in 1986 and was managed by Bupa until their hospital portfolio was acquired by Spire Healthcare in 2007. The North of England Hyperbaric Unit, which treats patients with carbon monoxide poisoning and divers recovering from the bends, was established on the site in 1998.

The Wilberforce Wing, a dedicated ten bed ward designed for NHS patients, was built at a cost of £800,000 and was opened by the Shadow Home Secretary David Davis on 24 November 2006. A new health centre, the Spire Lowfield Clinic, which was built on the site as part of the Anlaby housing development creating an extra 9,500 sq ft of space on two floors and 200 parking spaces, opened in summer 2016.

== See also ==
- List of hospitals in England
