= Arundel and District Hospital =

- Sussex Community NHS Foundation Trust
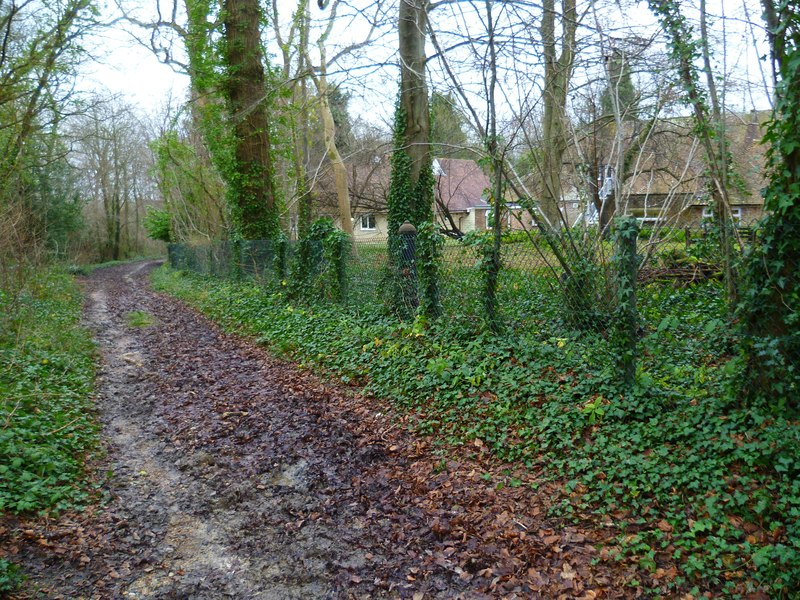
- Arundel and District Hospital viewed from the bridleway

- Shown in West Sussex

Geography
- Location: Chichester Road, Arundel, West Sussex, England, United Kingdom
- Coordinates: 50.8545°N 0.5652°W

Organisation
- Care system: Public NHS
- Type: Community

History
- Founded: 1906

Links
- Website: www.sussexcommunity.nhs.uk/services/locations/arundel.htm
- Lists: Hospitals in England

Arundel and District Hospital is a health facility in Chichester Road, Arundel, West Sussex, England. It is managed by the Sussex Community NHS Foundation Trust.

== History ==
The facility has its origins in the Arundel and District Emergency Hospital which opened in King Street in 1906. The site for the present facility in Chichester Road was a gift from the Duke of Norfolk. The building, which was designed by John Saxon Snell, opened as the Arundel and District Hospital in 1931. It joined the National Health Service in 1948 and was extended in 1964.
