= Bexley Hospital, Bexleyheath =

Geography
- Location: Bexleyheath, London, England
- Coordinates: 51.4571°N 0.1312°E

Organisation
- Type: Acute hospital

History
- Former names: Bexley Cottage Hospital and Provident Dispensar
- Opened: 1884
- Closed: 1978

Links
- Lists: Hospitals in England

Bexley Hospital, Bexleyheath was a cottage hospital on Upton Road in Bexleyheath, founded in 1884 and paid for by the Bexley United Charities. It was previously called the Bexley Cottage Hospital and Provident Dispensar. and the Bexley Cottage Hospital.

It was an acute hospital, and it ceased operating as a hospital in 1978. It is now known as the Upton Day Hospital, and is run by Oxleas NHS Foundation Trust.
