= St Crispin's Hospital =

Former psychiatric facility in England

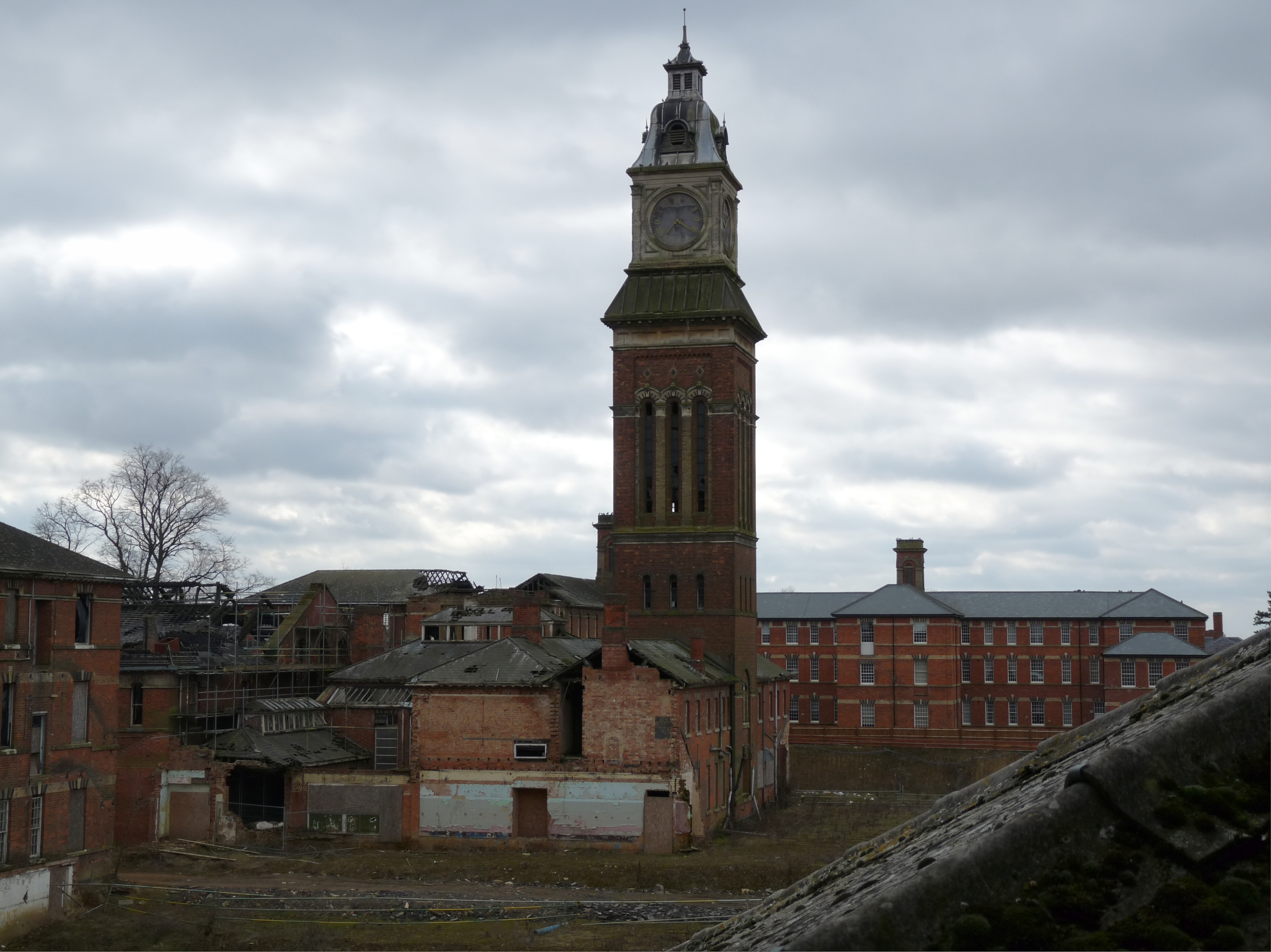
- The Asylum as it is today, the ward in view behind the tower has been converted to flats

- Shown in Northamptonshire

Geography
- Location: Northampton, England
- Coordinates: 52.243°N 0.958°W

Organisation
- Affiliated university: None
- Patron: None

Helipads
- Helipad: No

History
- Founded: 1876
- Closed: 1995

St Crispin's Hospital was a large psychiatric facility on the outskirts of Duston village in Northampton, Northamptonshire, England. Formerly known as Northampton Mental Hospital, it was established in 1876 and closed in 1995. The site has since been redeveloped for residential use with a small mental health unit still remaining there.

== History ==
Work started on the hospital in 1873. It was designed by Robert Griffiths using a corridor layout and opened as the Northampton County Lunatic Asylum in 1876. Additional blocks for children with mental health difficulties and for epileptics were completed in 1887. It served as a military hospital during the First World War and after the war it became Northampton Mental Hospital. It had joined the National Health Service in 1948 and two female patient villas were completed in 1954.

The hospital was used as a filming location in the 1977 series of Doctor Who, in a six-part story called The Talons of Weng-Chiang. The mortuary was used to represent a Victorian operating theatre.

Following the introduction of Care in the Community in the early 1980s the hospital went into a period of decline and closed in 1995. The children's block and the superintendents' house were developed by Taylor Wimpey for residential use between 2005 and 2008 and a small area was applied for the construction of Berrywood Hospital, a modern mental health facility.

In August 2014, over 80 Firefighters responded to an emergency call as a large fire broke out. One of the buildings was also seriously damaged in March 2015 after it was set on fire by arsonists.

== Gallery ==
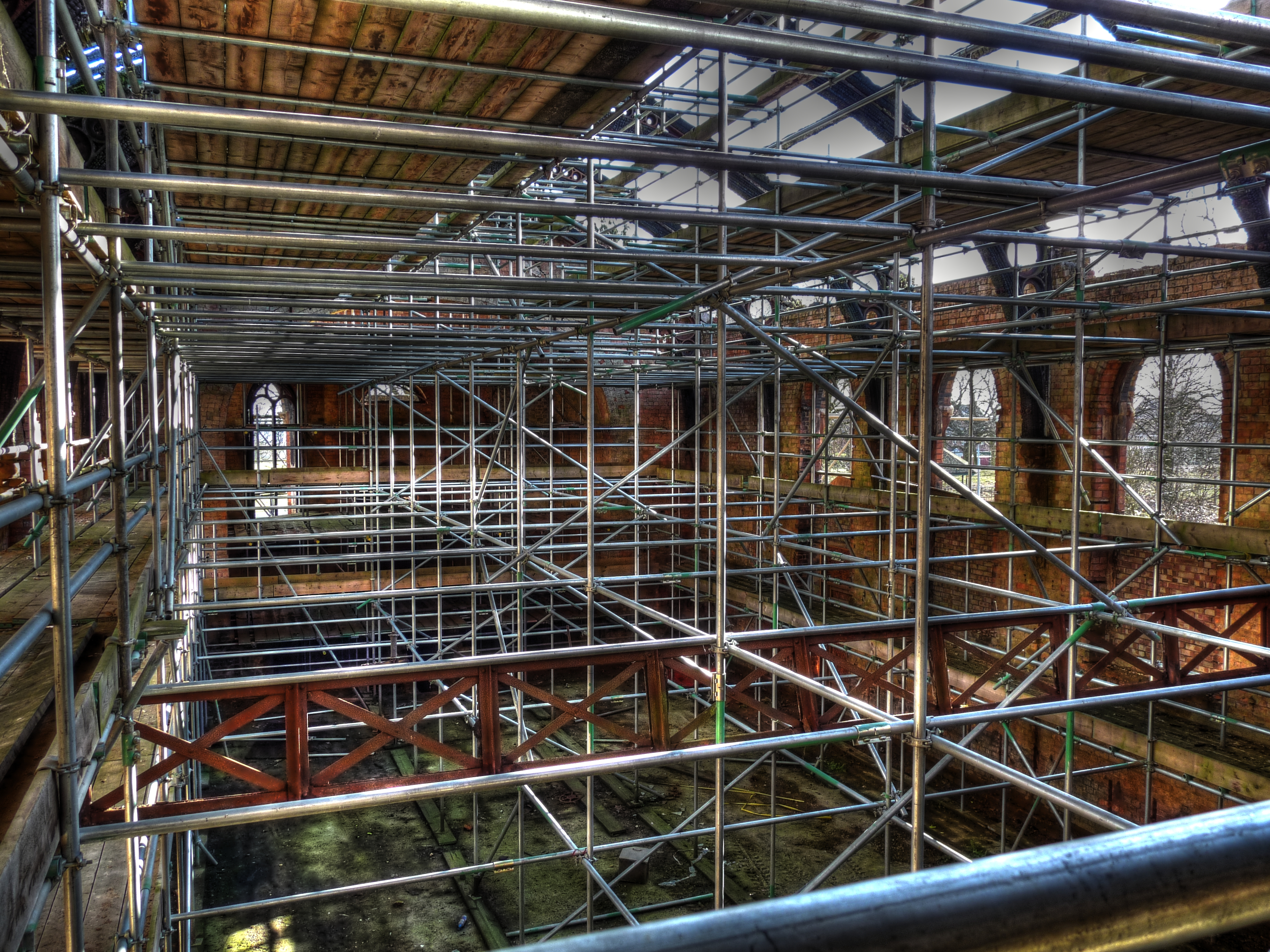
The Main Hall held up with scaffolding after a major fire

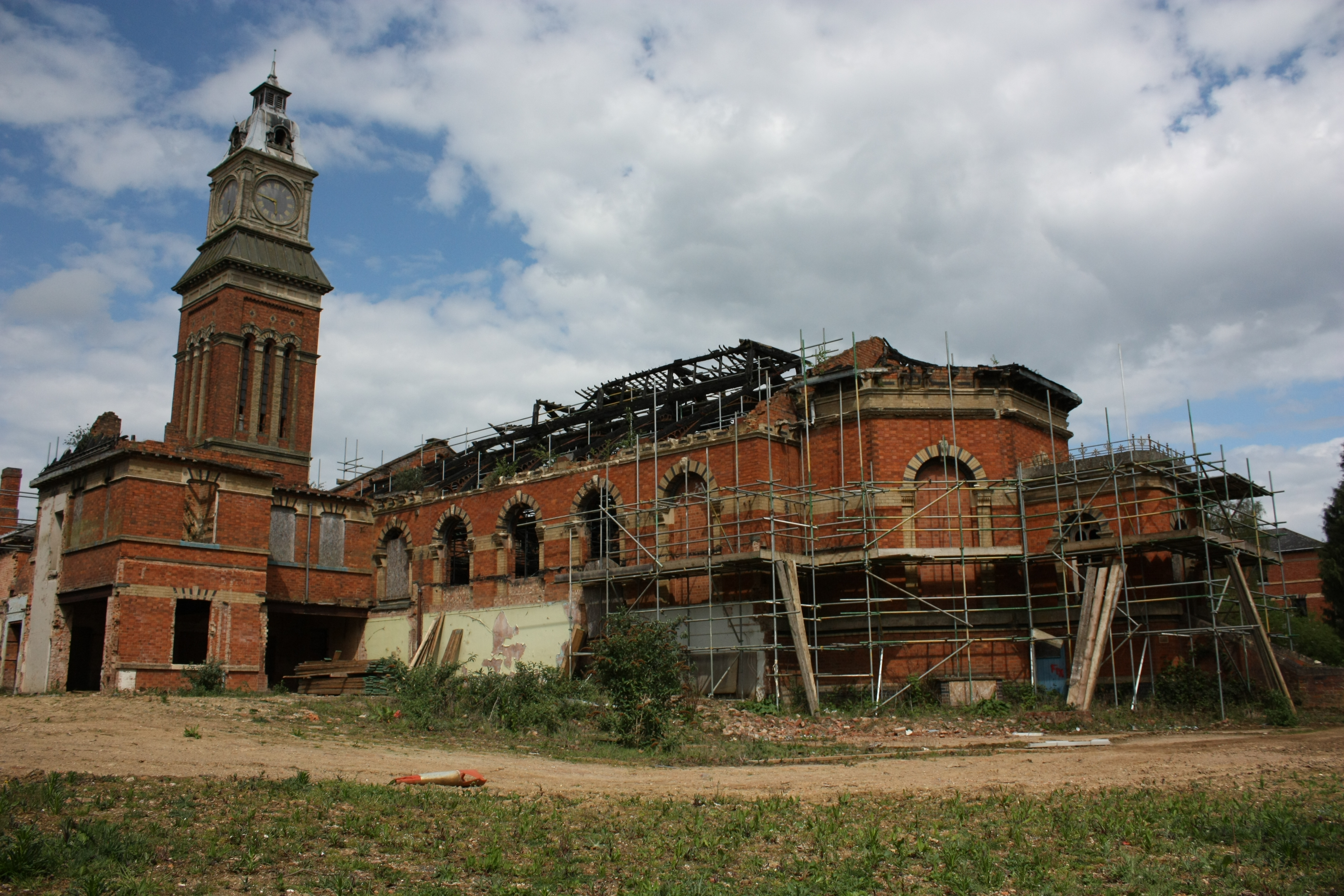
The Main Hall and Clock Tower

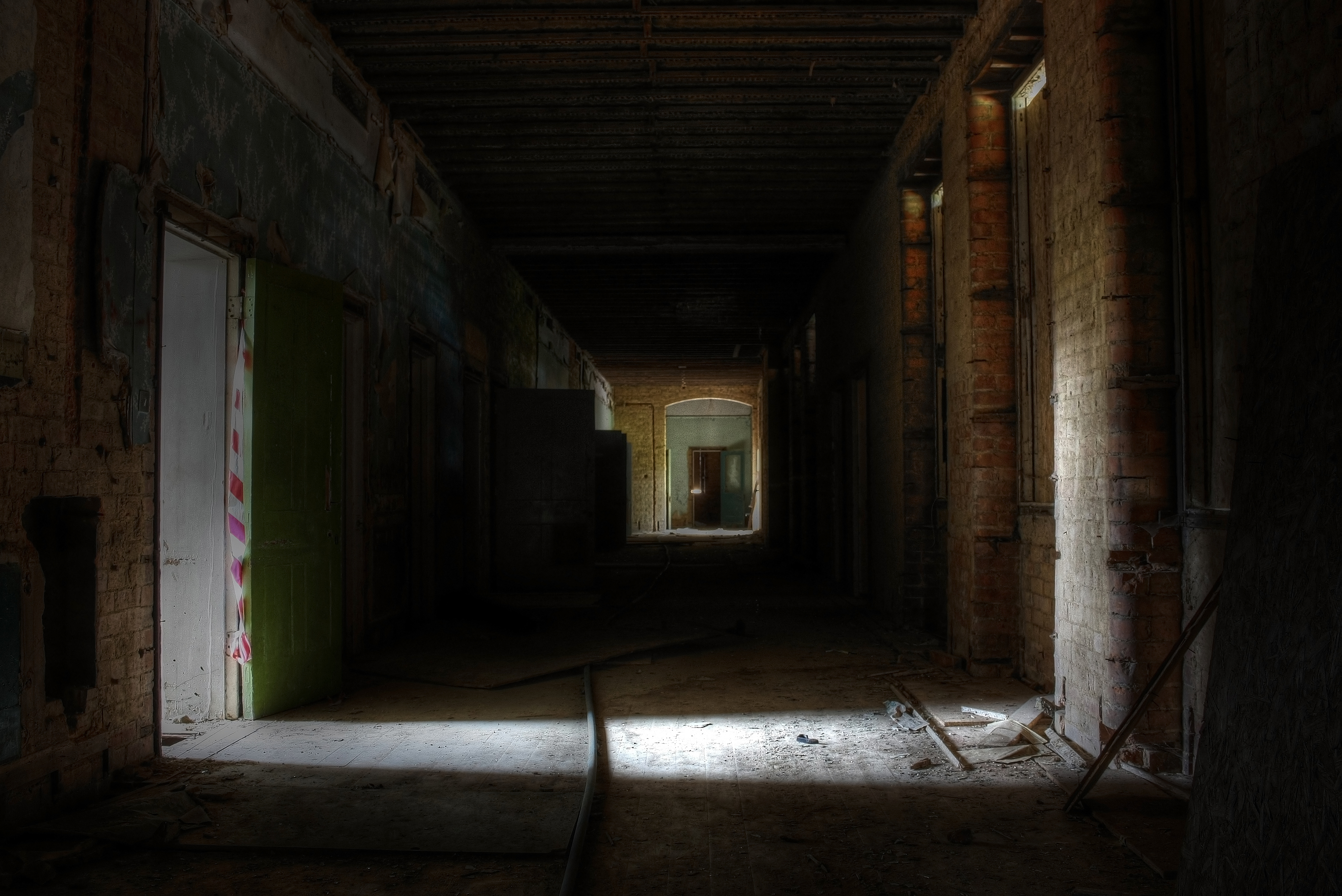
The ward blocks have been stripped of most of their original features
