= Berrywood Hospital =

Modern psychiatric hospital on the outskirts of Duston, Northampton

- Northamptonshire Healthcare NHS Foundation Trust
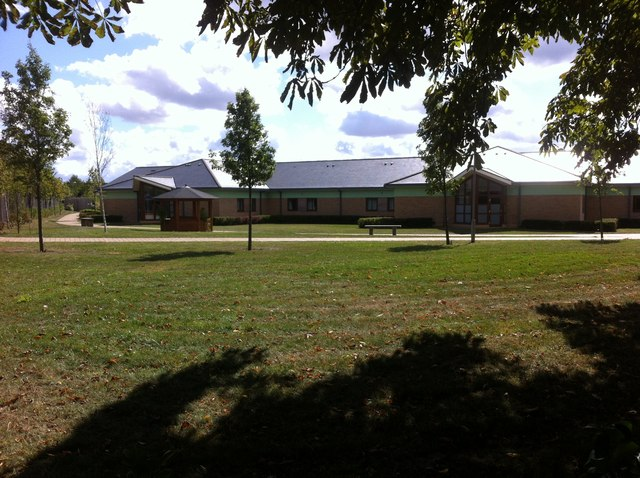
- Berrywood Hospital

- Shown in Northamptonshire

Geography
- Location: Northampton, England
- Coordinates: 52.247512°N 0.960120°W

Organisation
- Affiliated university: None
- Patron: None

Helipads
- Helipad: No

History
- Founded: 2010

Links
- Lists: Hospitals in England

Berrywood Hospital is a modern psychiatric hospital on the outskirts of Duston, Northampton. It is managed by Northamptonshire Healthcare NHS Foundation Trust.

== History ==
The hospital, which was built in the grounds of the former St Crispin's Hospital, opened in May 2010. It has inpatient mental health services for adults and older people, an assessment and treatment unit for people with learning disabilities, and a low secure unit.
