= Lynfield Mount Hospital =

Hospital in West Yorkshire, England

- Bradford District Care NHS Foundation Trust
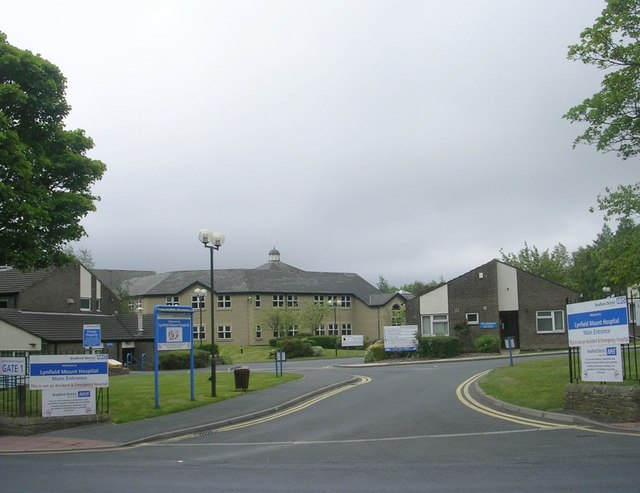
- Lynfield Mount Hospital

- Shown in West Yorkshire

Geography
- Location: Heights Lane, Bradford, West Yorkshire, England
- Coordinates: 53.8098°N 1.8053°W

Organisation
- Care system: NHS
- Type: Mental health

Services
- Emergency department: No

History
- Founded: 1913

Links
- Lists: Hospitals in England

Lynfield Mount Hospital is a mental health facility in Heights Lane, Bradford, West Yorkshire, England. It is managed by Bradford District Care NHS Foundation Trust.

== History ==
The facility has its origins in the Daisy Hill Union Workhouse, which was designed by Fred Holland and opened in 1913. It joined the National Health Service as Lynfield Mount Hospital in 1948. In 2015 it was announced that the newly opened Daisy Hill centre at the hospital would offer intensive therapy during a six-month programme.
