= Lanchester Road Hospital =

- Tees, Esk and Wear Valleys NHS Foundation Trust
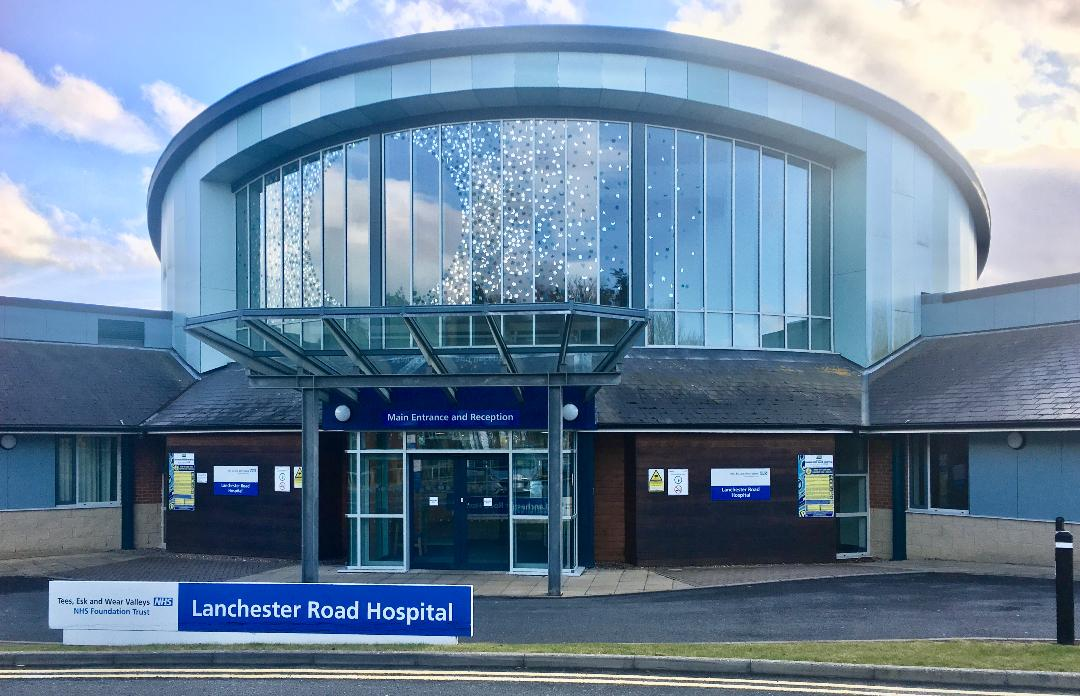
- Lanchester Road Hospital

Geography
- Location: Durham, County Durham, England, United Kingdom

Organisation
- Care system: Public NHS
- Type: Learning Disabilities, Psychiatric

Services
- Emergency department: No Accident & Emergency

Links
- Website: www.tewv.nhs.uk
- Lists: Hospitals in England

Lanchester Road Hospital is a mental health facility located in County Durham, England, and lies on a large site just north west of Durham city. It is managed by the Tees, Esk and Wear Valleys NHS Foundation Trust.

== History ==
The hospital has its origins in Earl's House Industrial School, which was opened as a vocational residential school by the magistrates of County Durham in 1885 on the former site of Earl's House Farm. The school was declared unfit for purpose in the 1920s and, in 1928, Earl's House Sanatorium was established on the site.

The sanatorium treated children with tuberculosis until 1953, when it became Earl's House Hospital - caring for people with mental health issues and learning disabilities. The hospital was used as an annex to Prudhoe and Monkton Hospital to accommodate about 120 children with learning difficulties in 1966. In 2003 it was announced that more than 50 patients were being moved from "outdated villas" at the hospital into "more modern accommodation with specially-adapted housing."

The hospital was procured under a Private Finance Initiative contract in 2008. It was announced that the new facility, named Lanchester Road Hospital, would provide adult mental health and learning disability services in "a safe, homely and therapeutic environment." The new facility, built at a cost of £17.9 million, opened in 2010.

== Services ==
There are seven wards at Lanchester Road Hospital: (i) Bek - learning disability (adults) assessment, treatment and rehabilitation services (ii) Farnham - adult inpatient services, male (iii) Harland - low secure forensic long-term treatment ward for male adults with a learning disability (iv) Langley - low secure forensic rehabilitation ward for male adults with a learning disability (v) Ramsey - learning disability (adults) assessment, treatment and rehabilitation services (vi) Roseberry, Bowes Lyon Unit - older people's assessment and treatment inpatient services and (vii) Tunstall - adult inpatient services, female. Appleton House is the home of the North of England Commissioning Support Unit and provides faith and chaplaincy services as well as pharmacy services.

== See also ==
- List of hospitals in England
