= Hellesdon Hospital =

- Norfolk and Suffolk NHS Foundation Trust
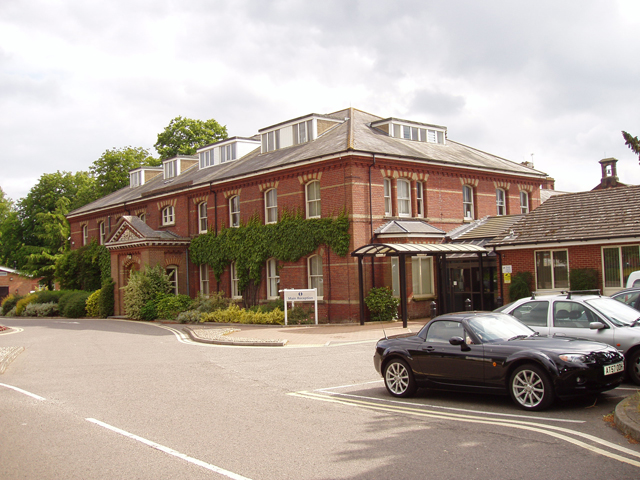
- Hellesdon Hospital

- Location within Norfolk

Geography
- Location: Hellesdon, Norfolk, England
- Coordinates: 52.6597°N 1.2523°E

Organisation
- Care system: NHS
- Type: Specialist

Services
- Emergency department: No
- Speciality: Mental Health

History
- Founded: 1828

Links
- Website: www.nsft.nhs.uk/Pages/Home.aspx
- Lists: Hospitals in England

Hellesdon Hospital is a mental health facility in Hellesdon, Norfolk, England. It is managed by Norfolk and Suffolk NHS Foundation Trust.

== History ==
The hospital has its origins in the Norwich Pauper Asylum which was established near the St. Augustine's gate area of Norwich in 1828. These facilities became inadequate and a new purpose-built hospital was designed by Richard Phipson using a corridor plan layout. It was opened as the Norwich Borough Asylum in 1880. An extension for male patients was completed in around 1900 and a similar one for female patients was completed in around 1920.

It became the Norwich City Mental Hospital in the 1920s and it joined the National Health Service as Hellesdon Hospital in 1948. Modern facilities have been added at the rear of the hospital but the main accommodation block remains in use.
