= Withernsea Community Hospital =

Hospital in the East Riding of Yorkshire, England

- Humber Teaching NHS Foundation Trust
- Shown in the East Riding of Yorkshire

Geography
- Location: Queen Street, Withernsea, East Riding of Yorkshire, England
- Coordinates: 53.7285°N 0.0318°E

Organisation
- Care system: NHS
- Type: Community

History
- Founded: 1998

Links
- Lists: Hospitals in England

Withernsea Community Hospital is a health facility in Queen Street, Withernsea, East Riding of Yorkshire, England. It is managed by Humber Teaching NHS Foundation Trust.

== History ==
The facility was procured under a private finance initiative contract in January 1998. The hospital, which was built by SOL Construction at a cost of £2.5 million, opened in November 1998. Ward admissions were suspended because of resourcing issues in August 2017.
