= Northgate Hospital =

- Norfolk and Suffolk NHS Foundation Trust
- Location in Norfolk

Geography
- Location: Northgate Street, Great Yarmouth, Norfolk, England, United Kingdom
- Coordinates: 52.617572°N 1.728667°E

Organisation
- Care system: Public NHS
- Type: Specialist

Services
- Beds: 20
- Speciality: Psychiatry

Links
- Website: www.nsft.nhs.uk/Pages/Home.aspx
- Lists: Hospitals in England

Northgate Hospital is a mental health hospital located in Great Yarmouth, Norfolk, England . It is managed by Norfolk and Suffolk NHS Foundation Trust.

== History ==
The hospital has its origins in the Great Yarmouth Union Workhouse designed by John Brown, the county surveyor, and established on the east side of Northgate Street in 1838. Following a critical inspection in 1894, a new building was allocated for infirmary use. A new acute ward, which serves patients with mental illnesses in the Great Yarmouth area, was built in 2004.

== See also ==
- List of hospitals in England
