= Horsham Hospital =

- Sussex Community NHS Foundation Trust
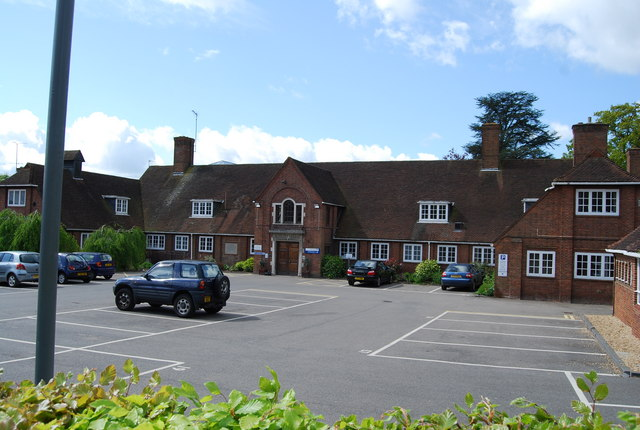
- Horsham Hospital

- Shown in West Sussex

Geography
- Location: Hurst Road, Horsham, West Sussex, England, United Kingdom
- Coordinates: 51.0701°N 0.3247°W

Organisation
- Care system: Public NHS
- Type: Community

History
- Founded: 1892

Links
- Website: www.sussexcommunity.nhs.uk/services/locations/horsham-hospital.htm
- Lists: Hospitals in England

Horsham Hospital is a health facility at Hurst Road in Horsham, West Sussex, England. It is managed by Sussex Community NHS Foundation Trust.

== History ==
The facility, which was financed by voluntary donations, was completed in 1892. The hospital expanded into new purpose-built facilities slightly further east along Hurst Road in May 1923. A physiotherapy department, an outpatients department and a new maternity unit were all introduced during the Second World War. After the hospital joined the National Health Service in 1948, further additions included extra wards in 1981 and a new outpatients department in 1997. In June 2019 the trust began a consultation on closing a dementia ward at the hospital. Dementia patients were subsequently moved from Horsham Hospital to Crawley Hospital.
