= Atherleigh Park Hospital =

Psychiatric Hospital in Greater Manchester, England

- Greater Manchester Mental Health NHS Foundation Trust
- Shown in Greater Manchester

Geography
- Location: Atherleigh Way, Leigh, Greater Manchester, England
- Coordinates: 53.5013°N 2.5258°W

Organisation
- Care system: NHS
- Type: Mental health hospital

Services
- Emergency department: No
- Beds: 90

History
- Founded: 2017

Links
- Website: www.gmmh.nhs.uk/atherleigh-park/
- Lists: Hospitals in England

Atherleigh Park Hospital is a mental health facility at the former Leigh East rugby league ground on Atherleigh Way in Leigh, Manchester, England. It is managed by Greater Manchester Mental Health NHS Foundation Trust.

== History ==
The hospital was intended to replace the aging mental health facilities at Leigh Infirmary which were established in 1906 and were no longer considered functional. Work on site started in January 2015. The new building was designed by AFL Architects, built by Kier Group at a cost of £40 million and opened in March 2017.

== Services ==
The hospital has a 20-bed Male acute ward (Sovereign Unit), a 20-bed Female acute ward (Westleigh Unit), a 16-bed mixed-sex acute ward (Prospect Unit), an 8-bed Psychiatric Intensive Care Unit (Priestners Unit), and a 26-bed ward providing short stay intermediate care for patients with dementia and memory difficulties and functional older adults (Golborne Unit). It uses a new type of door safety hinges and an innovative design for the new child and adolescent mental health unit. The hospital also maintains a Section 136 Suite and the Wigan Crisis Resolution and Home Treatment Team.
