= St Mary's Hospital, Kettering =

St Mary's Hospital
- Northamptonshire Healthcare NHS Foundation Trust
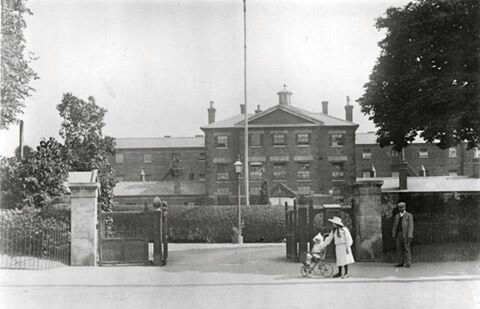
- St Mary's Hospital (before the height was reduced to one storey throughout)

- Shown in Northamptonshire

Geography
- Location: London Road, Kettering, Northamptonshire, England
- Coordinates: 52.3942°N 0.7218°W

Organisation
- Care system: NHS
- Type: Community hospital

Services
- Emergency department: No

History
- Founded: 1838

Links
- Website: www.nhft.nhs.uk/st-marys
- Lists: Hospitals in England

St Mary's Hospital is a health facility on London Road in Kettering, Northamptonshire, England. It is managed by Northamptonshire Healthcare NHS Foundation Trust. It was opened in 1838.

== History ==
The facility, which was designed by Sir George Gilbert Scott, opened as the Kettering Union Workhouse in 1838. An infirmary was added to the east of the main building in the mid-1890s. It became St Helen's Hospital in 1935 and joined the National Health Service as St Mary's Hospital in 1948. The height was reduced to one storey throughout in 1971. The Welland Centre, a mental health unit which was procured under a Private Finance Initiative contract, opened in 2005.
