= Ripon Community Hospital =

Hospital in North Yorkshire, England

- Harrogate and District NHS Foundation Trust
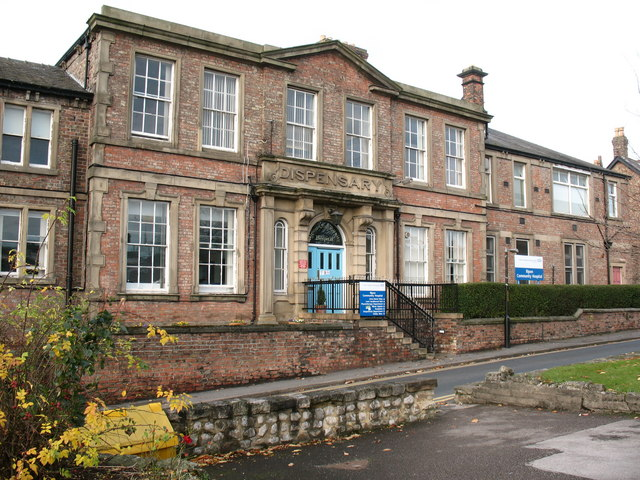
- Ripon Community Hospital

- Shown in North Yorkshire

Geography
- Location: Firby Lane, Ripon, North Yorkshire, England
- Coordinates: 54.1356°N 1.5270°W

Organisation
- Care system: NHS

Services
- Emergency department: No

History
- Founded: 1850

Links
- Lists: Hospitals in England

Ripon Community Hospital is a longstanding NHS community healthcare facility located in the cathedral city of Ripon, North Yorkshire, England. The hospital serves residents in Ripon and surrounding rural areas, providing a range of outpatient services, minor injury treatment, and rehabilitation care.

== History ==
The hospital was established as the Ripon Dispensary in 1850. It was subsequently converted into a hospital; a nurses' home, built to commemorate the golden wedding anniversary of the Marquess and Marchioness of Ripon, was completed in 1901. A new wing was opened by Princess Mary in 1926 and the hospital joined the National Health Service in 1948.

A new Community Diagnostic Centre opened in May 2024.

== Community involvement ==
Ripon Community Hospital has benefited from strong community support. The local League of Friends charity continues to raise funds for new equipment, facility upgrades, and patient comforts. Annual fundraising events are also held.

== Location and access ==
Ripon Community Hospital is situated on Firby Lane, close to the city centre and Ripon Cathedral.

== See also ==
- Listed buildings in Ripon
- National Health Service
- Harrogate and District NHS Foundation Trust
- List of hospitals in England
