= Bognor Regis War Memorial Hospital =

- Sussex Community NHS Foundation Trust
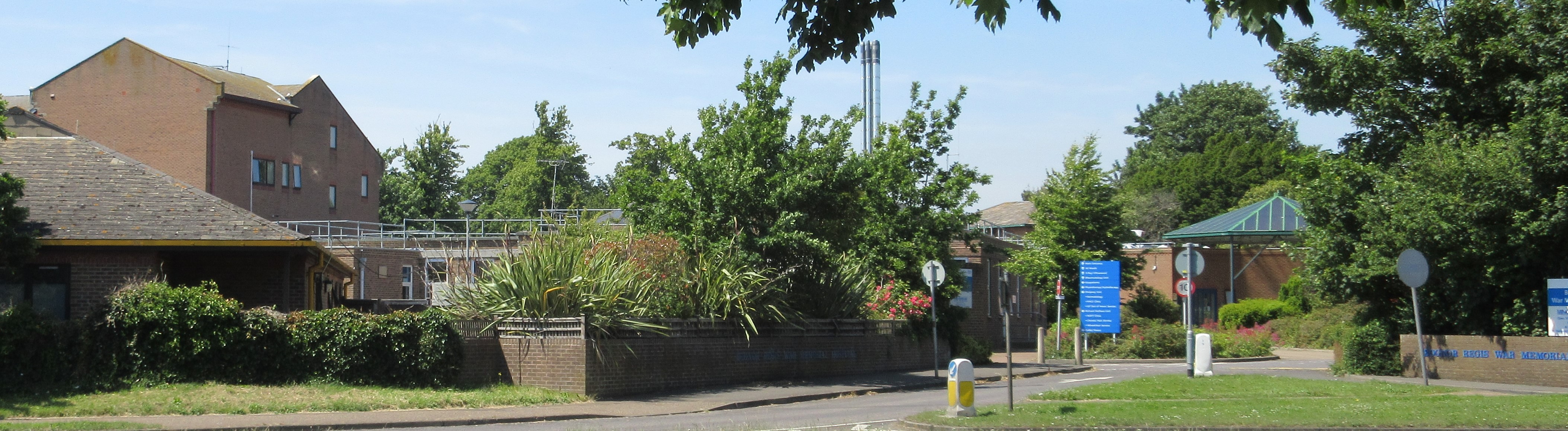
- Bognor Regis War Memorial Hospital

- Shown in West Sussex

Geography
- Location: Shripney Road, Bognor Regis, West Sussex, England, United Kingdom
- Coordinates: 50.7929°N 0.6755°W

Organisation
- Care system: Public NHS
- Type: Community

History
- Founded: 1919

Links
- Website: www.sussexcommunity.nhs.uk/services/locations/bognor-regis-hospital.htm
- Lists: Hospitals in England

Bognor Regis War Memorial Hospital is a health facility in Shripney Road, Bognor Regis, West Sussex, England. It is managed by Sussex Community NHS Foundation Trust.

== History ==
The facility, which was built as a lasting memorial to soldiers who died in the First World War, opened in 1919. It joined the National Health Service in 1948. Rheumatology staff at the hospital received a Healthcare Champions Award in 2008.
