= Lytham Hospital =

- Lancashire Care NHS Foundation Trust
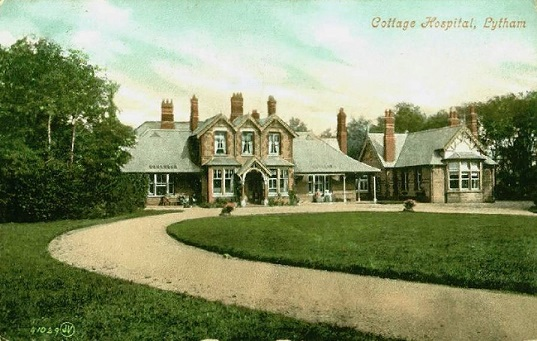
- The original Cottage Hospital in Lytham St Annes

- Location in Lytham St Annes

Geography
- Location: Lytham St Annes, Lancashire, England
- Coordinates: 53.7383°N 2.9474°W

Organisation
- Care system: NHS
- Type: Community Mental Health

History
- Founded: 1871

Links
- Website: www.lancashirecare.nhs.uk

Lytham Hospital is a health facility in Lytham St Annes, Lancashire. It is managed by Lancashire Care NHS Foundation Trust.

== History ==
=== Cottage hospital ===
The Lytham Cottage Hospital and Convalescent Home, which was instituted for the relief of the poor when suffering from sickness or accident, was funded by Colonel John Talbot Clifton, Squire of Lytham, at an original cost of £1,200 and opened in 1871. The original building was a two-storey structure with four wards containing 16 beds. There was an operating room for "cases of a severe nature". A mortuary was located in the yard.

Benefactors included Elizabeth Layland, who in 1734 had left £60 for the poor or the education of children, enough to generate an annuity of over £2 each year for the cottage hospital.

The hospital was enlarged at a cost of £700 between 1882 and 1883. There were then 25 beds, some of which were made available for patients outside a five miles radius of Lytham. A new ward, in memory of Dr. L. Fisher, was subscribed for and built in around 1910.

The hospital was completely rebuilt in the late 1920s when a time capsule containing contemporary artifacts was buried for future discovery. The hospital joined the National Health Service in 1948.

=== Primary Care Centre ===
Following a consultation in 2006, in patient services were transferred to Blackpool Victoria Hospital, and apart from two wards which were retained (Ansdell and Talbot Wards), the old cottage hospital was demolished. A new Lytham Primary Care Centre was erected in its place and opened in June 2009.

== See also ==
- List of hospitals in England
