= West Park Hospital =

- Tees, Esk and Wear Valleys NHS Foundation Trust
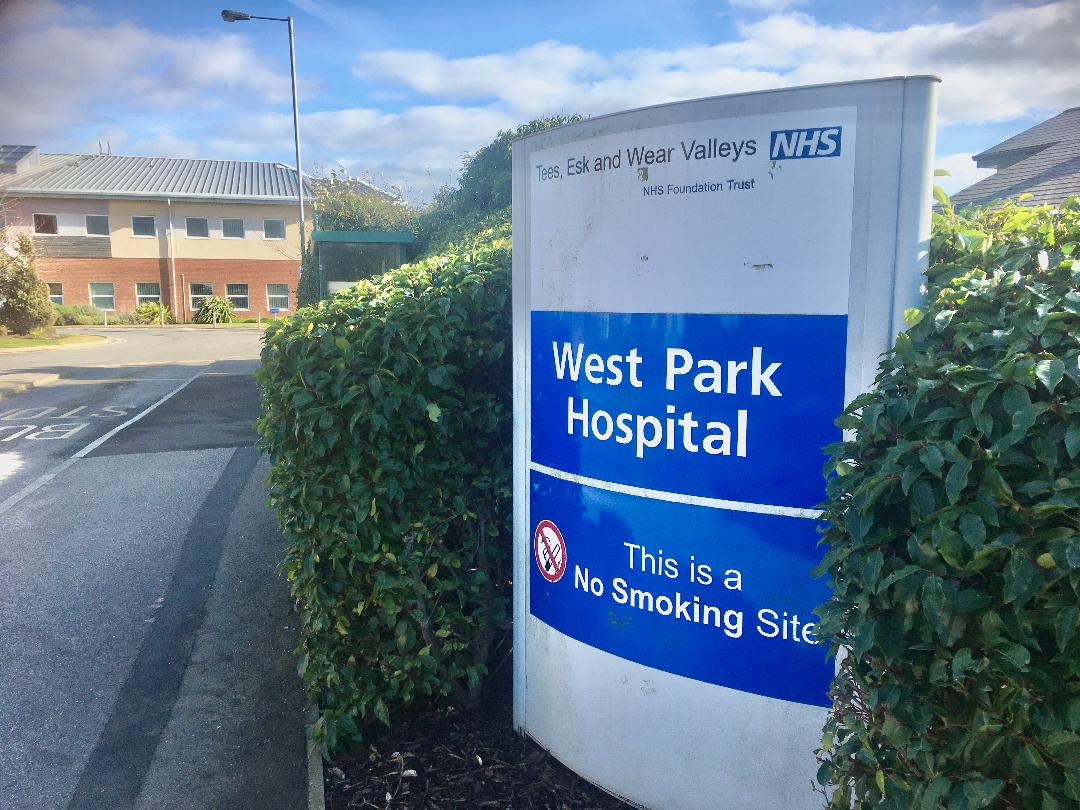
- West Park Hospital in Darlington - run by Tees, Esk and Wear Valleys NHS Foundation Trust.

Geography
- Location: Darlington, County Durham, England

Organisation
- Care system: NHS England
- Type: Psychiatric

Services
- Emergency department: No
- Beds: approximately 94

History
- Opened: December 2004

Links
- Website: www.tewv.nhs.uk
- Lists: Hospitals in England

West Park Hospital is a modern NHS adult psychiatric hospital in Darlington, County Durham, England. It is managed by the Tees, Esk and Wear Valleys NHS Foundation Trust.

== History ==
The hospital was procured under a Private Finance Initiative ('PFI') contract, to replace outdated facilitates at the Pierremont Unit and the Beaumont Ward at Darlington Memorial Hospital and at the Gables Unit in Sedgefield, in 2002. It was built at a cost of £16 million and was officially opened by Alan Milburn, Minister for the Cabinet Office, in December 2004. At the time of opening the new facility had 24 rooms for older people, 60 bedrooms for acute adult patients and 10 intensive care beds.

In 2009 the Trust decided to exercise a break clause in the contract allowing it to terminate the contract early by paying £18 million up front. (Note: Hexham General Hospital is another example of the Trust buying itself out of the PFI contract)

== See also ==
- List of hospitals in England
