= Roseberry Park Hospital =

- Tees, Esk and Wear Valleys NHS Foundation Trust
- Location within North Yorkshire

Geography
- Location: Middlesbrough, North Yorkshire, England
- Coordinates: 54.5549116°N 1.2194287°W

Organisation
- Care system: NHS
- Type: Mental health and learning disability facility

Services
- Beds: 365

History
- Founded: 2011

Links
- Lists: Hospitals in England

Roseberry Park Hospital is a mental health facility in Middlesbrough, North Yorkshire, England, run by the Tees, Esk and Wear Valleys NHS Foundation Trust.

== History ==
The hospital was procured under a Private Finance Initiative contract in 2007 to replace St Luke's Hospital, Middlesbrough. The facility, which was designed by MAAP and built by Laing O'Rourke at a cost of £75 million, opened in 2010. However, following concerns about defects in the building, some patients were moved to Sandwell Park Hospital in Hartlepool in October 2017.
