= Northamptonshire Healthcare NHS Foundation Trust =

UK NHS foundation trust

Northamptonshire Healthcare NHS Foundation Foundation Trust
- Type: NHS hospital trust
- Established: 23 March 2000
- Chair: Crishni Waring
- Chief executive: Angela Hillery
- Website: www.nhft.nhs.uk

Northamptonshire Healthcare NHS Foundation Trust (NHFT) is an NHS Foundation Trust (NHFT) founded 1 May 2009 which provides mental health and community services across Northamptonshire, England, and specialist services in prisons.

NHFT manages the following main locations:

- St Mary's Hospital, Kettering
- Berrywood Hospital, Northampton
- Campbell, Newland, and Lotus Houses, Northampton
- Isebrook Hospital, Wellingborough
- Danetre Hospital, Daventry
- Corby Community Hospital and Willowbrook Health Centre, Corby
- Brackley Community Hospital, Brackley

The chief executive of NHFT, Angela Hillery, was a finalist for the HSJ Chief Executive of the Year in November 2015. The trust was rated 'Good' by the Care Quality Commission in March 2017, and 'Outstanding' In 2018 and 2019 respectively. The Board of Directors are responsible for overseeing the work and services of the Trust and setting their future activity. The Board is made up of both executive directors (employed directly by the Trust) and non-executive directors (appointed by the Council of Governors).

On 20 March 2023, Angela Hillery was ranked as the number one chief executive in the NHS by the Health Service Journal.

== Partnership and NHFT ==
NHFT works in partnership with organisations across the county and England, which include:

- 3Sixty Care GP Federation is a joint venture which covers Corby, East Northamptonshire, Wellingborough, and surrounding areas.
- Northamptonshire Integrated Care System, formerly known as Northamptonshire Health and Care Partnership (NHCP); is made up of key health and care providers in the county who seek to improve health and care for people living in Northamptonshire. All organisations have their individual responsibilities for the services they provide.
- Northamptonshire Healthcare has been working in a group arrangement with Leicestershire Partnership NHS Trust since 2021

== See also ==
- List of NHS trusts
