= Auckland Park Hospital =

- Tees, Esk and Wear Valleys NHS Foundation Trust
- Shown in County Durham

Geography
- Location: Bishop Auckland, County Durham, England
- Coordinates: 54.6552°N 1.6832°W

Organisation
- Type: Specialist

Services
- Speciality: Mental health

History
- Founded: 1980

Links
- Website: www.tewv.nhs.uk/aucklandparkhospital
- Lists: Hospitals in England

Auckland Park Hospital in Bishop Auckland provides psychiatric care to the elderly. It is managed by Tees, Esk and Wear Valleys NHS Foundation Trust.

== History ==
The facility is a former maternity unit, constructed circa 1980, which used to be part Bishop Auckland General Hospital before the new hospital was constructed. It contains two assessment wards, one functional (for depression, psychosis etc.) and one organic (for dementia). There is a further ward for continuing care where elderly people are cared for prior to going into a care home. The hospital also has an outpatient clinic and serves as a community base for elderly psychiatry. In November 2015 the Trust carried out a consultation on the possible closure of two wards.

== See also ==
- List of hospitals in England
