= Sussex Community NHS Foundation Trust =

Community health trust

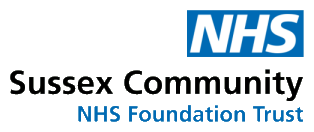
- Former name: Sussex Community NHS Trust
- Headquarters: Brighton General Hospital, Brighton
- Region served: West Sussex, Brighton & Hove and High Weald, Lewes and Havens
- Establishments: Bognor Regis War Memorial Hospital; Brighton General Hospital; Arundel and District Hospital; Horsham Hospital; Midhurst Community Hospital; Uckfield; Crowborough; Lewes
- Budget: £185m
- Chair: Giles York
- Chief executive: Siobhan Melia

Sussex Community NHS Foundation Trust is a community health trust established as a result of the Transforming Community Services programme. It is the main provider of NHS community health services across West Sussex Brighton and Hove and has an annual budget of £185m. It became an NHS foundation trust in March 2016.

Siobhan Melia, has a clinical background having worked as a podiatrist, before moving into senior clinical leadership and managerial roles within the NHS. Siobhan was appointed as the new chief executive of the trust in October 2016 taking over from Paula Head, who was chief executive since January 2013.

The trust claims to be the first NHS organisation in Sussex to have achieved accreditation as a ‘Living Wage Employer’, paying its staff a minimum of £7.45 per hour.

It runs services at Bognor Regis War Memorial Hospital, Brighton General Hospital, Arundel and District Hospital, Horsham Hospital and Midhurst Community Hospital.

In December 2013 it was announced that the trust had arranged a deal with Capita to identify ‘new and exciting ways of achieving its vision of excellent care at the heart of the community’. The £22m partnership is hoped to save around £15m. Capita agreed a five-year strategic partnership with the trust to help it achieve foundation trust status in 2014 which will see Capita provide clinical expertise, service design, and health intelligence and reporting. It aims to transform the trust's property and facilities management and services to improve the estate and to help the trust's procurement team to find opportunities for better value from non-salary expenditure.

The trust is part of the Sussex Musculoskeletal Partnership with Brighton and Hove Integrated Care Service, Horder Healthcare and Sussex Partnership NHS Foundation Trust. In May 2014 the consortium won a five-year musculoskeletal contract worth £210m from Brighton and Hove, Crawley and Horsham and Mid Sussex clinical commissioning groups.

It was named by the Health Service Journal as one of the top hundred NHS trusts to work for in 2015. At that time it had 3,460 full-time equivalent staff and a sickness absence rate of 4.83%. 72% of staff recommend it as a place for treatment and 60% recommended it as a place to work.

== See also ==
- Healthcare in Sussex
- List of NHS trusts
