= University Hospital of North Tees =

- North Tees and Hartlepool NHS Foundation Trust
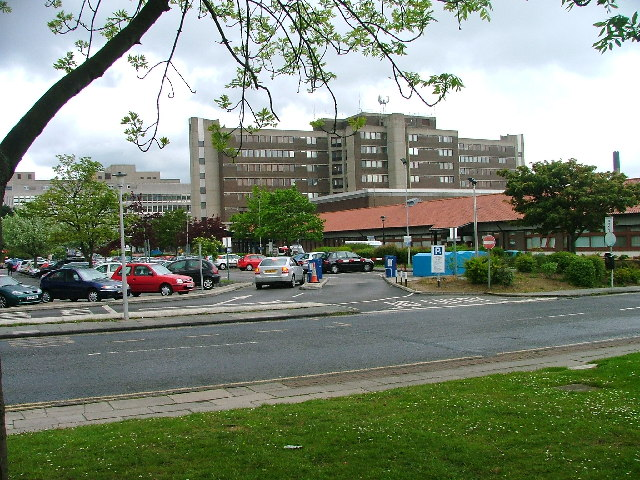
- University Hospital of North Tees

- Shown in County Durham

Geography
- Location: Stockton-on-Tees, England, United Kingdom
- Coordinates: 54.5829°N 1.3482°W

Organisation
- Care system: Public NHS
- Type: District General
- Affiliated university: Newcastle University Medical School; University of Sunderland School of Medicine

Services
- Emergency department: Yes - Accident and Emergency
- Beds: 563

History
- Founded: 1968

Links
- Website: http://www.nth.nhs.uk
- Lists: Hospitals in England

The University Hospital of North Tees is a general hospital in Stockton-on-Tees, England which provides healthcare to people living in the south east of County Durham. It is managed by the North Tees and Hartlepool NHS Foundation Trust.

== History ==
North Tees General Hospital was built in phases: the first phase, comprising the maternity department, some 50 mental-illness beds and a day hospital, started in 1965 and was completed in 1968. The second phase, comprising 440 acute beds, a further 132 mental-illness beds and an accident and emergency department, started in 1969 and was completed in 1974. In 2001 it became known as the University Hospital of North Tees.

The accident and emergency department was the subject of the BBC documentary programme Panorama in January 2014. The programme showed the pressures placed on emergency departments by waiting time targets. Then in January 2018 the BBC reported that the hospital was among those with the best waiting times in England but that patients were forced to wait in ambulances and in corridors. Staff were overworked and under pressure, many saying they would have to leave due to that reason.

== See also ==
- List of hospitals in England
