= South West London and St George's Mental Health NHS Trust =

- Type: NHS trust
- Headquarters: 61 Glenburnie Road; London; SW17 7DJ
- Hospitals: Richmond Royal Hospital; Springfield University Hospital
- Staff: 2,449 (2018/19)
- Website: www.swlstg.nhs.uk

South West London and St George's Mental Health NHS Trust is an NHS trust that provides mental health services for adults, older people, children and adolescents living in the London boroughs of Kingston, Merton, Richmond, Sutton and Wandsworth.

== Services ==
Services available in south west London:

- Inpatient, outpatient and community services for children, adults and older people with mental health problems
- Forensic inpatient and community services for people with mental health problems who have been through the criminal justice system

National services:

- Mental health services for deaf children and adults
- Eating disorders services for children and adults
- Services for the treatment of obsessive-compulsive and body-dysmorphic disorders

The trust employs more than 2000 staff who operate from more than 90 sites, some of which are owned and run by the trust and others which are owned by other organisations. It runs community services from a number of locations including Richmond Royal Hospital and Barnes Hospital and has three main inpatient hospital sites – Queen Mary's Hospital in Roehampton, Tolworth Hospital and Springfield University Hospital in Tooting, which houses the trust headquarters.

At any one time the trust has approximately 20,000 people in contact with its services.

== Performance ==
In 2019, the Care Quality Commission inspection report rated the hospital as "Good". With emphasis on "Good, effective leadership at all levels of the organisation" and "Improvements in a number of areas including in the physical health care of patients and the way patients were cared for after receiving rapid tranquillisation."

In 2011 concerns about the quality of the trust's services were raised by local people, commissioners and the Care Quality Commission. And in 2012, local CCGss commissioned a report which was critical, accusing the trust of “poor or very poor service user feedback, inadequate handling of serious untoward incidents, although it acknowledged some improvements.

In 2011, the trust began restructuring services in order to support the development of more services closer to home in each borough. Investment in community services and restructuring of the inpatient services has led to a reduction in the number of inpatient beds – The trust closed 177 beds between 2011 and 2013.

The trust currently has around 430 inpatient beds. It plans to reduce inpatient beds across south-west London by 10 percent before 2018, and treat more people in the community. This is to be funded partly by the sale of land.

In November 2013 it was announced that the trust would be among the first to trial the Care Quality Commission’s planned approach to inspecting mental health services. As an aspirant Foundation Trust, the trust was chosen as one of five Mental Health Trusts to pilot the commission's new inspection process. The trust's inspection took place in March 2014. The report was published on 12 June 2014.

It was named by the Health Service Journal as one of the top hundred NHS trusts to work for in 2015. At that time it had 1940 full-time equivalent staff and a sickness absence rate of 4.36%. 56% of staff recommend it as a place for treatment and 54% recommended it as a place to work.
