= Ripley Hospital =

- Derbyshire Community Health Services NHS Foundation Trust
- Shown in Derbyshire

Geography
- Location: Sandham Lane, Ripley, Derbyshire, England
- Coordinates: 53.0479°N 1.4109°W

Organisation
- Care system: NHS
- Type: Community

History
- Founded: 1912

Ripley Hospital is a health facility in Sandham Lane, Ripley, Derbyshire, England. It is managed by Derbyshire Community Health Services NHS Foundation Trust.

== History ==
The facility was commissioned after the death of a miner injured at Pentrich Colliery, who did not survive the road journey to Derby in time for treatment. It opened as Ripley Cottage Hospital in September 1912 and joined the National Health Service as Ripley Hospital in 1948.
