= Springfield University Hospital =

Coordinates: 51.4385°N 0.1766°W

- South West London and St George's Mental Health NHS Trust
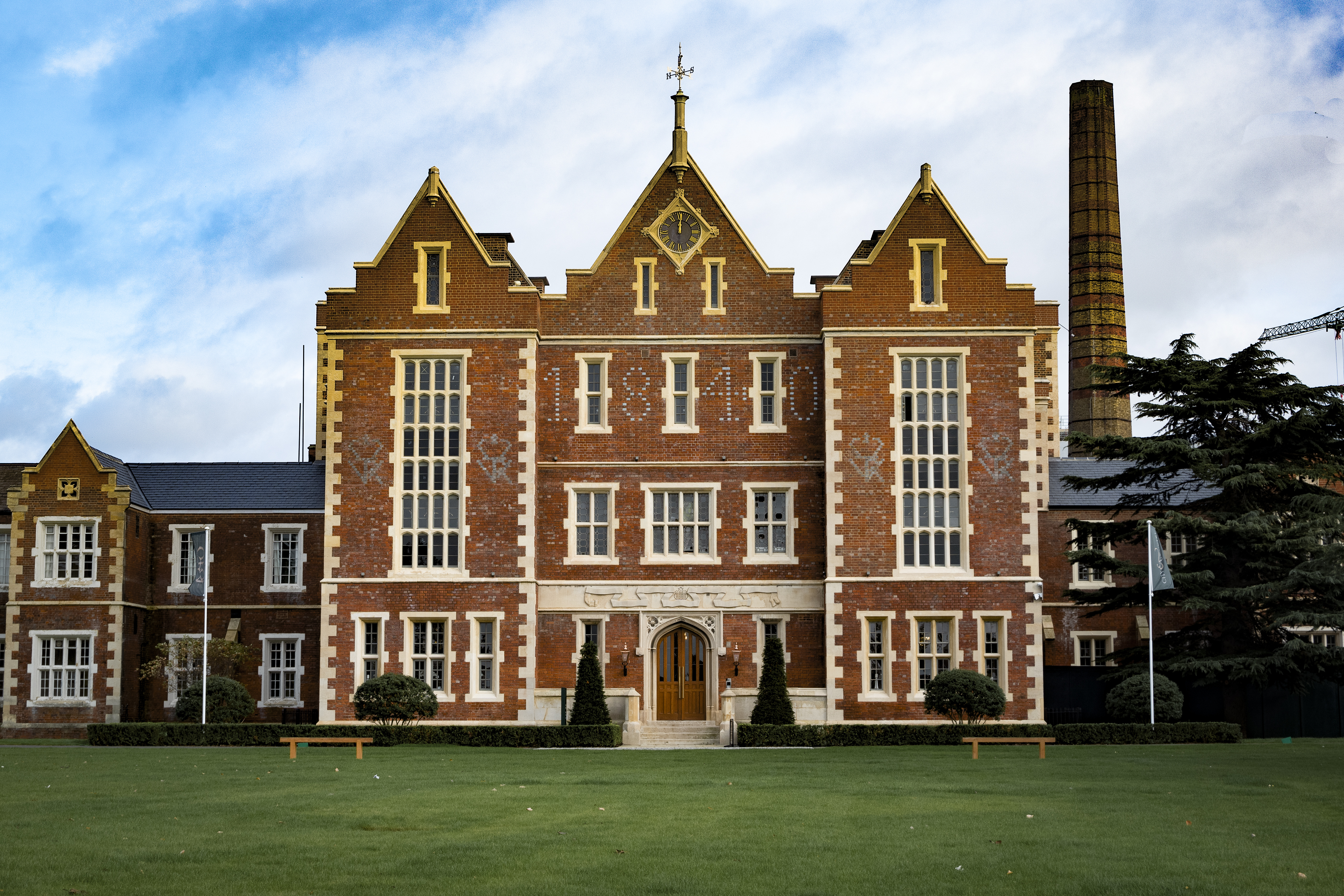
- Springfield Hospital main building

Geography
- Location: 15 Springfield Drive, Tooting, London, England, United Kingdom

Organisation
- Care system: NHS England
- Type: Psychiatric
- Affiliated university: St George's, University of London

History
- Founded: 1840; 186 years ago

Links
- Website: http://www.swlstg-tr.nhs.uk
- Lists: Hospitals in England

Springfield University Hospital is a psychiatric hospital in Tooting, South London and also the headquarters of the South West London and St George's Mental Health NHS Trust.

== History ==
Information card for ceremony to celebrate the opening of the New Infirmary block on 7 July 1932.

The hospital opened as the Surrey County Pauper Lunatic Asylum in 1840. The original building was a grand symmetrical red brick Tudor-style composition enclosing a large courtyard, built to the designs of Edward Lapidge, the county surveyor. A purpose-built chapel was added in 1881. It came under the management of Middlesex County Council in 1888 and was renamed the Wandsworth Asylum.

During the First World War it became the Springfield War Hospital and, after the war, it became the Springfield Mental Hospital. A new infirmary block to treat mentally ill patients who were also physically ill opened in July 1932. During the Second World War a serious bout of dysentery broke out at the hospital. It joined the National Health Service in 1948.

It was one of the hospitals investigated in 1967 as a result of the publication of Barbara Robb's book Sans Everything. The committee found that at least two of the charge nurses showed themselves prone to outbursts of ill-temper which expressed itself in violence.

In 2004 John Barrett, who had paranoid schizophrenia, walked out of the hospital and stabbed Dennis Finnegan, a cyclist, to death.

In its heyday the hospital had 2,000 patients but it is now reduced to under 300 inpatients. Much of the original hospital building is now disused, and there are plans to convert this to a residential development, "Springfield Village". Proceeds are being used to create new state-of-the-art mental health centres at Springfield and at Tolworth Hospital in Surbiton.

In January 2020, £150 million of funding was approved to create eight new inpatient wards at the hospital. In February 2020, the hospital was featured in the BBC documentary On the Psych Ward.

=== Johnny Savile sexual abuse case ===
Following the exposure of Jimmy Savile as a paedophile in 2012, an NHS investigation reported amid Operation Yewtree in 2015 on allegations of assaults by Savile's older brother Johnny at the hospital from 1978 to 1980, prior to his dismissal in 1980 and death in 1998. Investigators believed that at least one such assault occurred and that others were likely or most likely. The chief executive of the hospital trust offered his "heartfelt apologies to the victims".
