= Peterlee Community Hospital =

- North Tees and Hartlepool NHS Foundation Trust
- Shown in County Durham

Geography
- Location: O'Neill Drive, Peterlee, County Durham, England
- Coordinates: 54.7542°N 1.3332°W

Organisation
- Care system: NHS
- Type: Community

History
- Founded: Late 1990s

Peterlee Community Hospital is a health facility in O'Neill Drive, Peterlee, County Durham, England. It is managed by North Tees and Hartlepool NHS Foundation Trust.

== History ==
The facility was commissioned after pressure from local members of parliament to provide modern healthcare in this growing industrial area. After appropriate ground condition surveys, construction started and it opened as Peterlee Community Hospital in the late 1990s. The urgent care centre closed for overnight treatment in late 2019.
