= University Hospital of Hartlepool =

- North Tees and Hartlepool NHS Foundation Trust
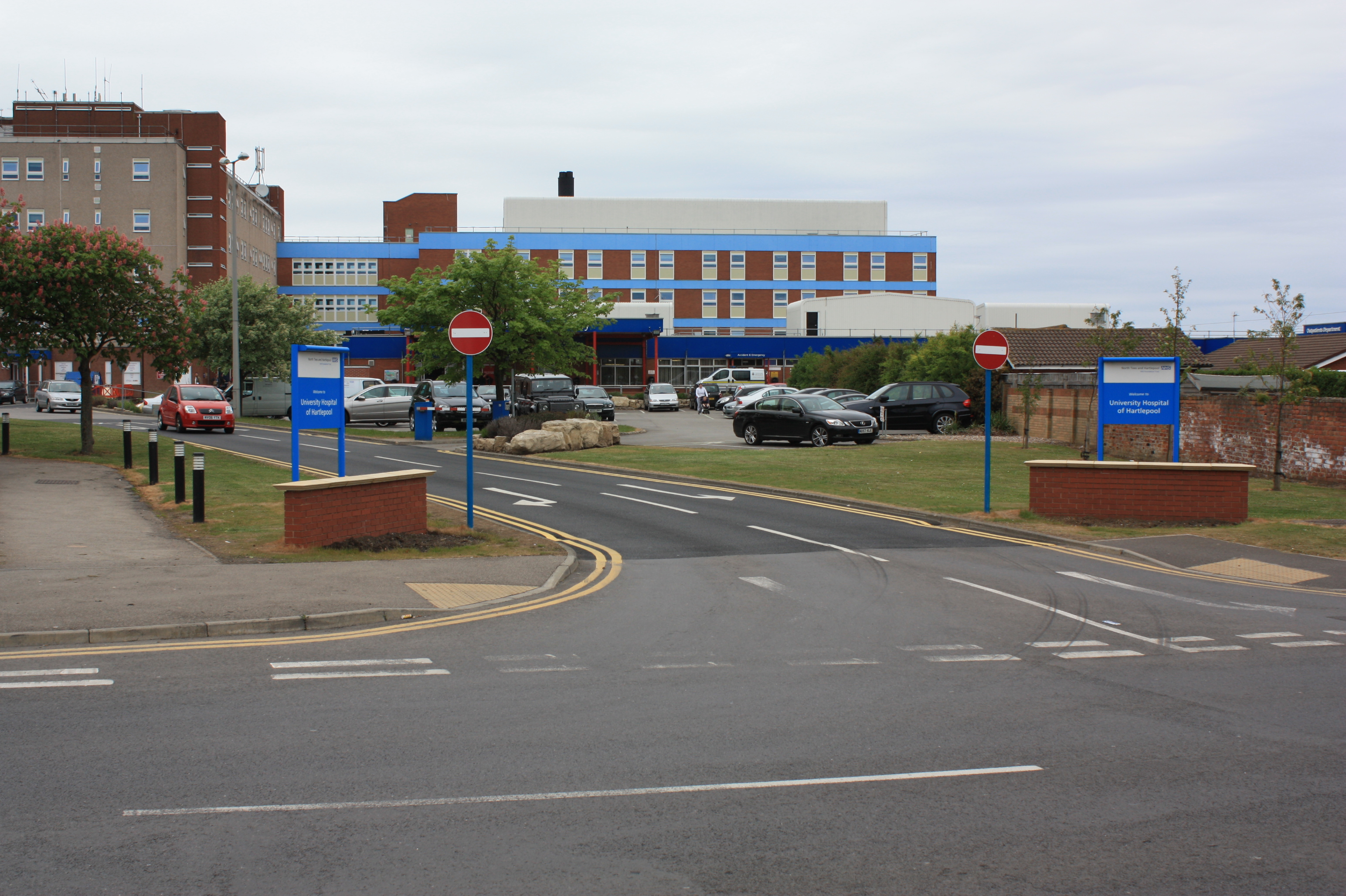
- University Hospital of Hartlepool

- Shown in County Durham

Geography
- Location: Hartlepool, County Durham, England
- Coordinates: 54.7024°N 1.2276°W

Organisation
- Care system: NHS
- Type: District general

Services
- Beds: 278

History
- Founded: 1889

Links
- Website: www.nth.nhs.uk
- Lists: Hospitals in England

The University Hospital of Hartlepool is a general hospital in Hartlepool, England. It provides healthcare to people living in southeast Durham. It is managed by the North Tees and Hartlepool NHS Foundation Trust.

== History ==
The hospital has its origins in an infirmary which was built for the Hartlepool Union Workhouse and which opened at Holdforth Road in 1889. The infirmary suffered fire damage during a bombardment on 16 December 1914 during the First World War. It became known as the Howbeck Infirmary in 1925.

It also suffered bomb damage on the night of 7/8 July 1942 during the Second World War.

The Duchess of Kent opened the new Hartlepool General Hospital on the same site in 1972. In 2001 it became known as the University Hospital of Hartlepool.

In 2016 the hospital and grounds were used as the setting for the fictional Brimlington Hospital for BBC One comedy Hospital People.

== See also ==
- List of hospitals in England
