= Alderney Hospital =

- Dorset HealthCare University NHS Foundation Trust
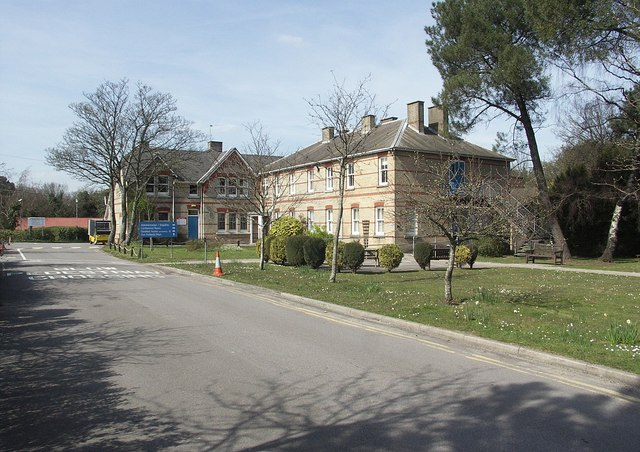

Geography
- Location: Alderney, Dorset, England, United Kingdom
- Coordinates: 50.7499°N 1.9412°W

Organisation
- Care system: Public NHS
- Type: Specialist

Services
- Emergency department: No Accident & Emergency
- Beds: 88
- Speciality: Geriatric care, Dementia, Physiotherapy

Helipads
- Helipad: No

History
- Opened: 1889

Links
- Lists: Hospitals in the United Kingdom

Alderney Hospital is a National Health Service hospital in Alderney (a suburb of Poole, Dorset) and is a part of Dorset Healthcare University NHS Foundation Trust.

== History ==
Alderney Hospital was commissioned in 1889 by Poole Rural District Council as an isolation hospital; the hospital provided care for people suffering from a range of infectious diseases including typhoid and diphtheria. Smallpox care was not provided here, instead being provided at Baiter Hospital – erected during the 1887 epidemic.

Poole Rural Sanitary District was abolished by The Local Government Act 1894; by 1912 Poole Town Council had assumed responsibility for the hospital.

In 2018, £5.9 million was given by the Department of Health to aid older people's inpatient mental health services at the hospital.

== Facilities ==
Alderney Hospital provides in-patient assessment and treatment services to older adults with organic mental health disorder across two wards. St Brelades is a 17-bed ward for males and Herm is a 23-bed ward for both sexes.

The hospital also provides inpatient physical rehabilitation services to older people across two wards, Guernsey and Jersey, totalling 48 beds.

=== Haymoor Day Hospital ===
Haymoor Day Hospital, sometimes referred to as Haymoor Day Centre, is located on the grounds of Alderney Hospital. The unit provides non-residential care for those experiencing mental health crisis in an effort to avoid hospital admission.

== See also ==
- Healthcare in Dorset
- List of hospitals in the United Kingdom
