= Brighton General Hospital =

- Sussex Community NHS Trust
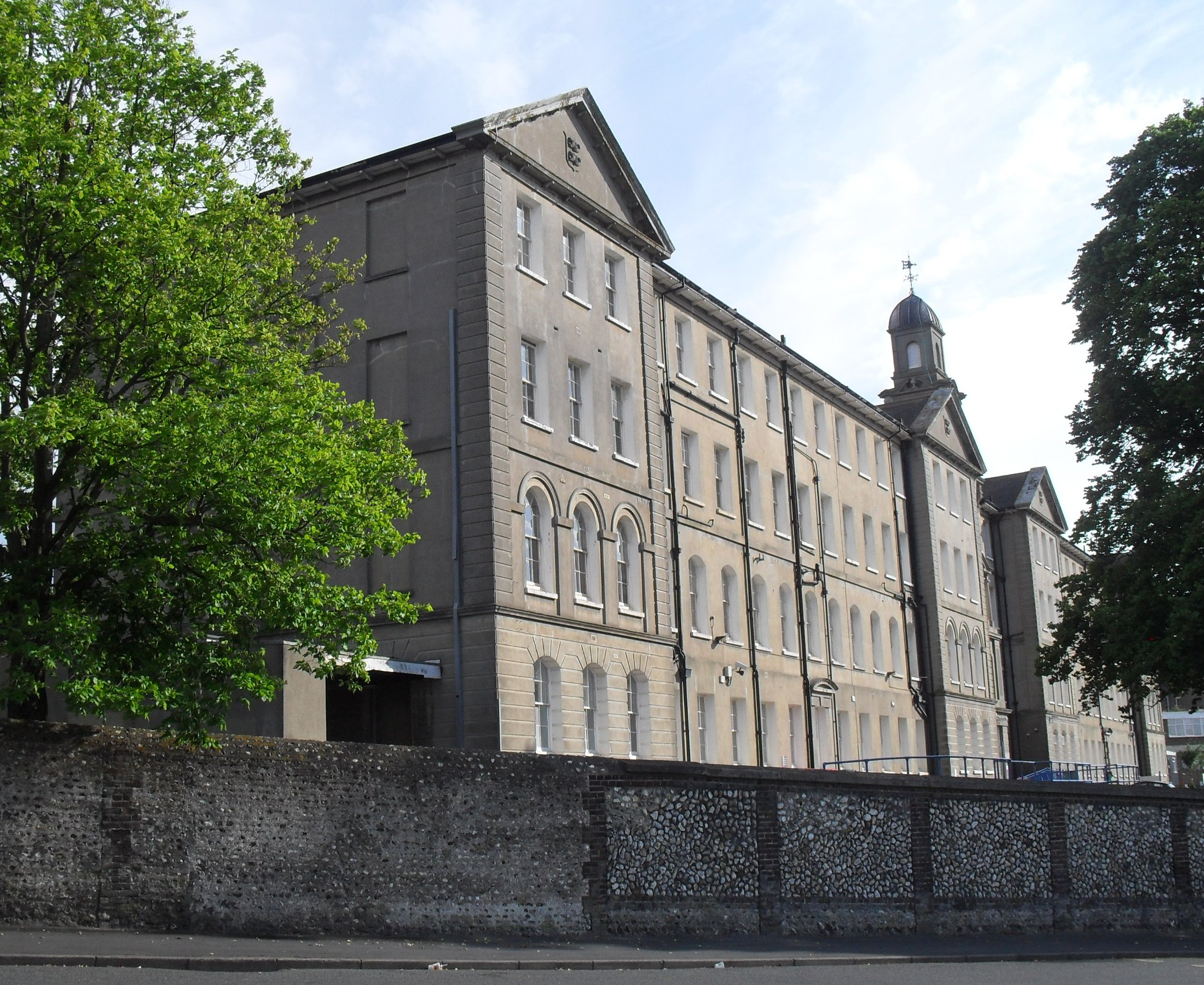
- Brighton General Hospital

- Location within East Sussex

Geography
- Location: Brighton, East Sussex, England
- Coordinates: 50.8310°N 0.1145°W

Organisation
- Care system: National Health Service
- Type: General

History
- Founded: 1867

Links
- Website: www.sussexcommunity.nhs.uk

Brighton General Hospital is an acute general hospital on Elm Grove in Brighton, East Sussex. It is managed by Sussex Community NHS Trust. The main Arundel building is Grade II listed.

== History ==
The hospital has its origins in the Brighton Workhouse Infirmary which was designed by George Maynard and opened in September 1867. It was extended to create additional wards and pavilions in the 1880s. The building served as the Kitchener Indian Hospital during the First World War. It became Brighton Municipal Hospital in 1930 and joined the National Health Service as Brighton General Hospital in 1948.

== Development ==
In October 2018, the trust announced that it intended to sell most of the site for residential development. The plan is to convert the listed buildings for residential use, and provide a new purpose-built community health facility on part of the site.

== Services ==
The hospital offers a range of screening, diagnostic, treatment and rehabilitation services including paediatrics, elderly care, diabetic care, back care, audiology, physiotherapy, and specialist care for heart failure, MS and Parkinson's disease. The trust says that despite its name, the site is no longer a hospital as it has various clinics but no overnight beds.
