= Tees, Esk and Wear Valleys NHS Foundation Trust =

NHS mental health trust

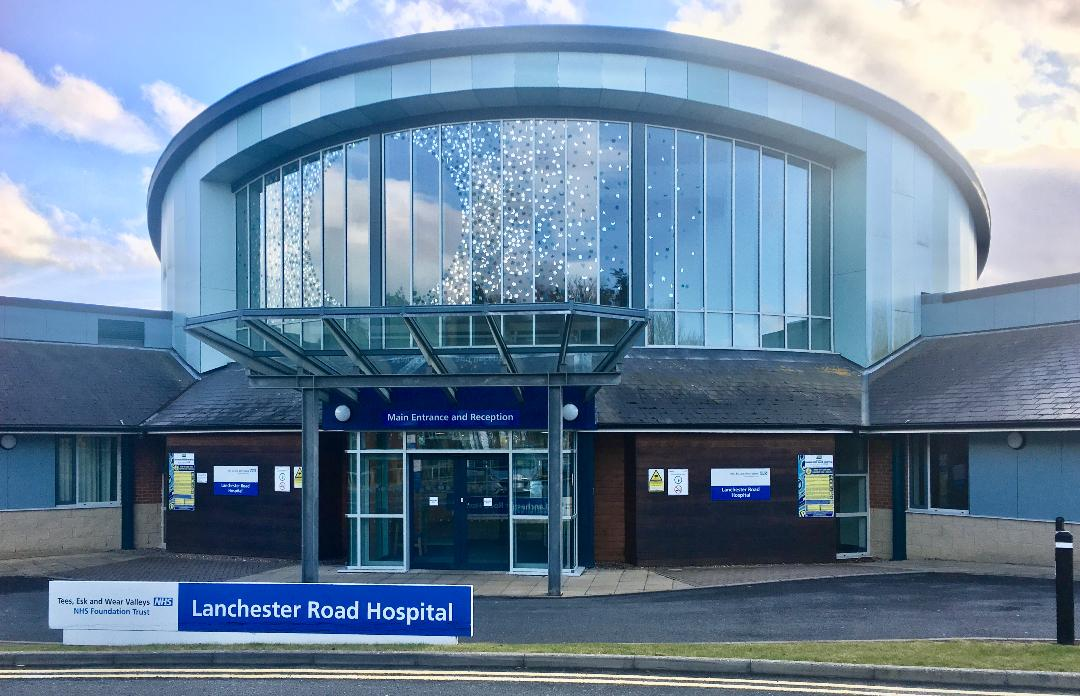
- Type: NHS hospital trust
- Headquarters: West Park Hospital, Darlington
- Region served: County Durham and north of North Yorkshire
- Establishments: Lanchester Road Hospital, Durham; Roseberry Park Hospital, Middlesbrough; West Park Hospital, Darlington; Auckland Park Hospital, Bishop Auckland; Cross Lane Hospital, Scarborough; Catterick Integrated Care Centre, Catterick Garrison
- Budget: £423 million
- Chair: Paul Murphy
- Chief executive: Brent Kilmurray
- Website: www.tewv.nhs.uk

The Tees, Esk and Wear Valleys NHS Foundation Trust is an NHS trust that provides mental health, learning disability and eating disorders services. It serves a population of around two million people living in County Durham, Darlington and most of North Yorkshire. It is geographically one of the largest NHS Foundation Trusts in England.

The Trust's annual income is approximately £423 million. It delivers its services by working in partnership with local authorities and clinical commissioning groups, a wide range of other providers including voluntary organisations and the private sector, as well as service users, their carers and the public. The Trust employs about 7,500 staff, who work across more than 200 sites. The headquarters of the Trust are located at West Park Hospital, Darlington.

== History ==
The Trust was created in April 2006 following the merger of County Durham and Darlington Priority Services NHS Trust and Tees and North East Yorkshire NHS Trust. The aim of the merger was to provide a "high quality range of mental health and learning disability services for the people who live in our areas, and beyond". In 2008 the Trust became the first mental health Foundation Trust in the North East and, since then, it has expanded both geographically and in the number and type of services provided.

Key events during the history of the Trust included the opening of Lanchester Road Hospital, Durham, in 2009 and the opening of Roseberry Park Hospital in Middlesbrough in 2010.

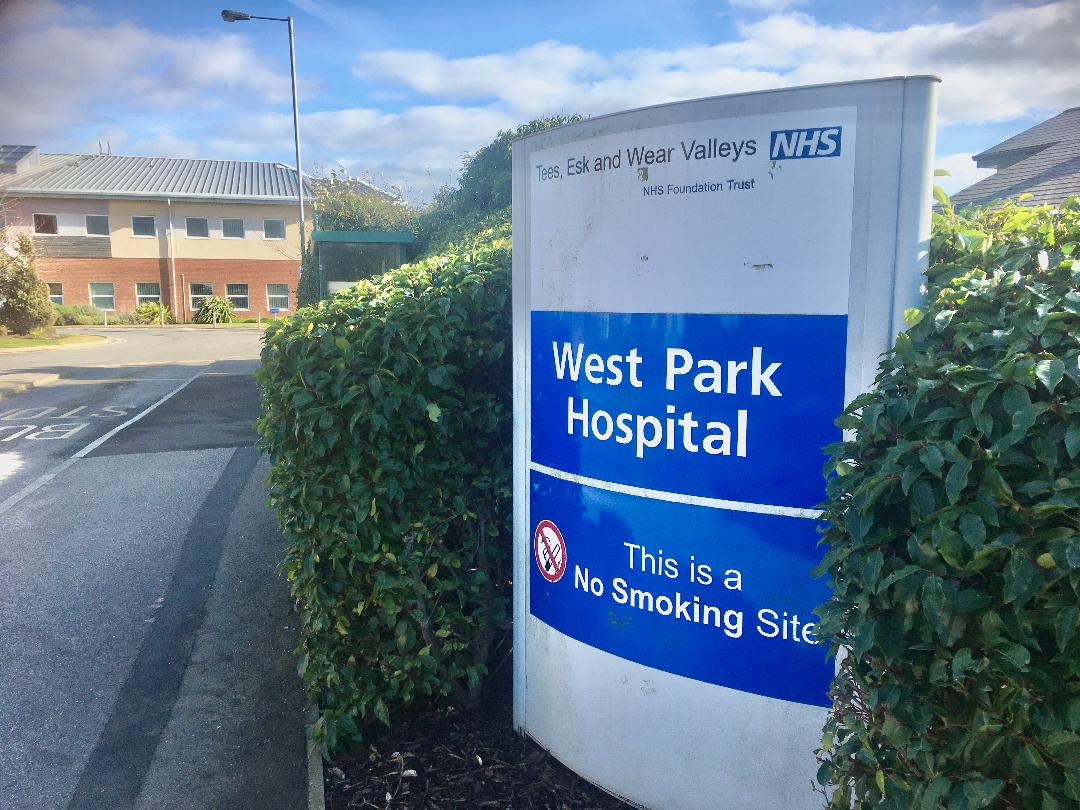
West Park Hospital in Darlington

It was praised by the independent watchdog, the Healthcare Commission, in 2007 for the quality of its services and in 2011 it was named Mental Health Service Provider of the Year by the Royal College of Psychiatrists. In the same year, the Trust opened its first regional specialist centre for adults and children with eating disorders at West Park Hospital, in Darlington and West Lane Hospital, Middlesbrough.

Other notable events over the past decade include the re-opening of Cross Lane Hospital, Scarborough, in 2013 and the completion of the £13.8 million rebuilding project at West Lane Hospital, Middlesbrough, in 2016. In 2015 the Trust opened the Old Vicarage, in Seaham, as part of its commitment to modernise its mental health and learning disabilities services, staffed by nurses, doctors, therapists, psychologists, support and social workers previously based at Easington Medical Centre. It was awarded a contract to run mental health and learning disability services in the York area to start in October 2015.

The Trust was awarded a Gold Standard by Investors in People in 2015 and, in the same year, it took over mental health services for seven prisons as part of the North East Prison Cluster. In 2016 all Trust sites became smoke free.

== Services ==
The Trust provides community and inpatient care across adult mental health, in addition to services for young people and children, forensic services and mental health services for older people. It also delivers mental health care within prisons across the North East, Cumbria and parts of Lancashire. Between April 2020 and March 2021 a total of 84,333 unique patients were referred to the Trust's services.

Adult Mental Health Services: Treatment for people of working age. This includes inpatient, day and outpatient assessment such as acute, intensive care and rehabilitation services. The Trust also delivers community-based services including crisis intervention, assertive outreach and early intervention. The main hospitals involved in Adult Mental Health Services include Lanchester Road, West Park, Roseberry Park, Cross Lane Hospital and Foss Park Hospital.

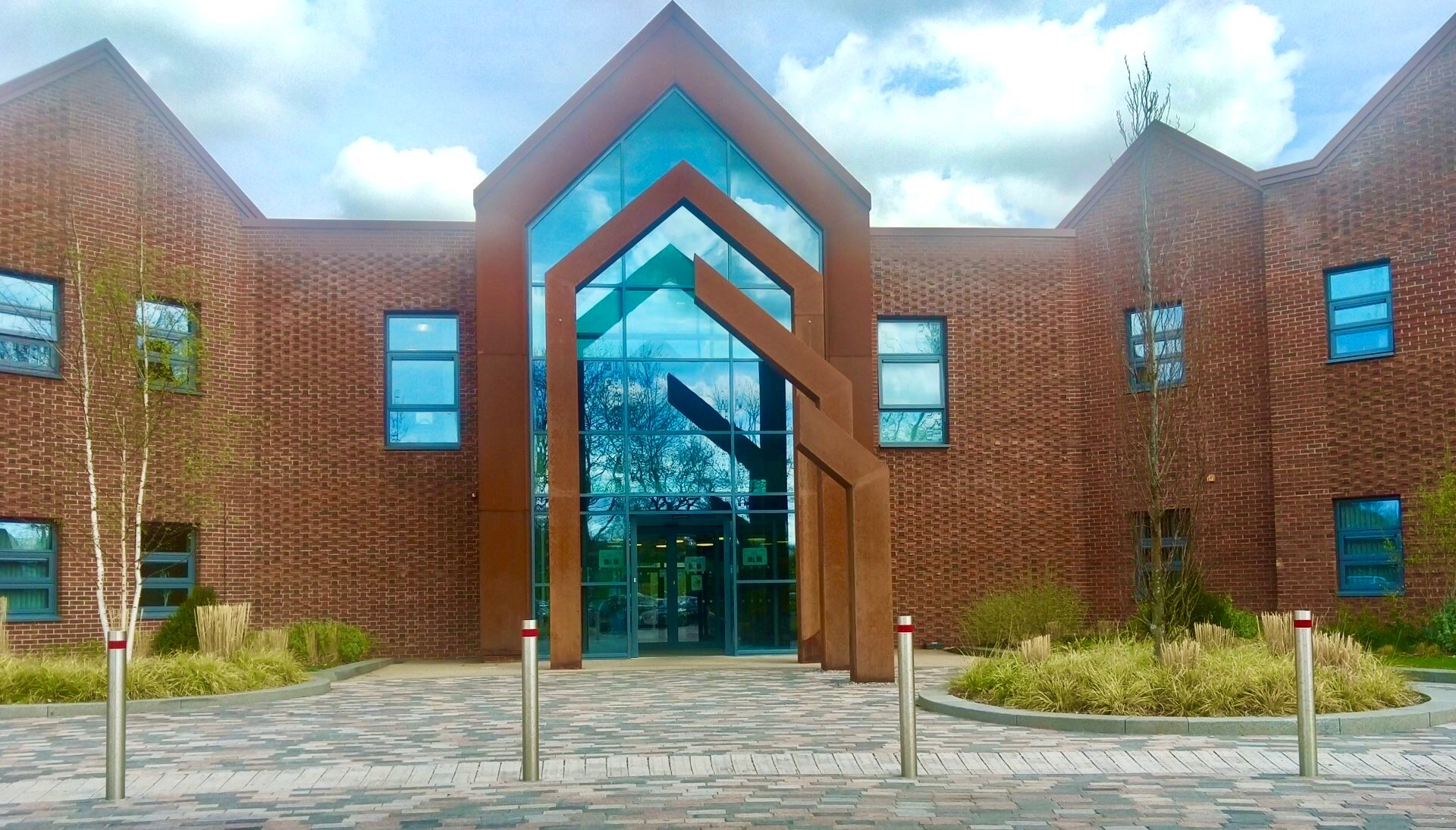
Foss Park Hospital in York - run by Tees, Esk and Wear Valleys NHS Foundation Trust.

Mental Health Services for Older People: Services for older people in partnership with social care, voluntary groups and independent service providers. Treatment includes inpatient acute, intensive care and rehabilitation services. The Trust also delivers community-based services like day services. The main hospitals involved include The Bowes Lyon Unit, Durham, West Park Hospital, Roseberry Park, Auckland Park, Bishop Auckland, Sandwell Park, Hartlepool, Cross Lane Hospital, Briary Wing at Harrogate District Hospital and Foss Park Hospital.

Intellectual Disabilities and Forensic Services: Specialist assessment and treatment services to people with intellectual disabilities and mental health problems, epilepsy and challenging behavior. Services are also provided for people with mental health problems who need to be cared for in medium or low secure environments. The main hospitals include Roseberry Park, Bankfields Court, Middlesbrough and Lanchester Road Hospital.

In April 2020 the Trust opened Foss Park, a 72-bed facility for people with dementia or conditions such as psychosis, severe depression or anxiety in York. It has a section 136 assessment suite for people detained under the Mental Health Act, and an electroconvulsive therapy suite.

A 24/7 freephone crisis line for people struggling with their mental health was launched by the Trust in May 2020. More than 237,500 calls were made to the crisis line in the first ten months.

== Performance ==
The Care Quality Commission inspection in December 2014 was positive with patients and carers said they were treated with respect and courtesy by staff.

It was named by the Health Service Journal as one of the top hundred NHS trusts to work for in 2015. At that time it had 5437 full-time equivalent staff and a sickness absence rate of 5.11%. 70% of staff recommend it as a place for treatment and 64% recommended it as a place to work.

In March 2016 the trust was ranked fourth in the Learning from Mistakes League.

In August 2019 the trust's West Lane Hospital in Middlesbrough was closed by the Care Quality Commission after the deaths of two seventeen-year-old female patients.

== Private finance initiative contract ==
Logo of Tees, Esk and Wear Valleys NHS Foundation

The trust established a private finance initiative contract with Three Valleys Healthcare for the £75 million Roseberry Park Hospital in Middlesbrough, a 312-bed hospital built by Laing O'Rourke. It required payment of a total of £321 million to the company until 2039–40. Three Valleys Healthcare Holdings, the parent company went into administration in 2017. In June 2017 it issued a "termination notice" because of building defects and problems with the fire safety system and claimed damages because of missed targets by the hard facilities management service, delivered by Carillion, and costs incurred by the construction problems. In 2011 it was the first trust to buy out a PFI contract, related to the rebuilding of West Park Hospital in Darlington.

In June 2018 Three Valleys Healthcare Limited went into liquidation as a result of the collapse of Carillion. The affected staff were moved to a subsidiary company (TEWV Estates and Facilities Management Limited) which the trust had set up.

== See also ==
- List of NHS trusts
