= William Davies =

William, Will, Bill, or Billy Davies may refer to:

== Arts and literature ==
- William Davies (actor) (1751–1809), English actor
- William Davies (died 1819), English publisher with Cadell & Davies
- William Edmund Davies (1819–1879), English bookmaker
- W. H. Davies (William Henry Davies, 1871–1940), Welsh poet
- William Davies (screenwriter) (fl. 1980s–2010s), British-born American screenwriter

== Law and politics ==
- William Davies (Georgia judge) (1775–1829), Georgia-based politician and lawyer
- William Davies (Pembrokeshire MP) (1821–1895), British member of parliament (MP) for Pembrokeshire, 1880–1892
- William Davies (New South Wales politician) (1824–1890)
- William T. Davies (1831–1912), lieutenant governor of Pennsylvania, US, 1887–1891
- Sir William Howell Davies (politician) (1851–1932), British MP for Bristol South, 1906–1922
- William Thomas Frederick Davies (1860–1947), South African surgeon, army officer and politician
- William Rees-Davies (judge) (William Rees Morgan Davies, 1863–1939), British MP for Pembrokeshire, 1892–1898
- Rupert Davies (politician) (William Rupert Davies, 1879–1967), Canadian author, newspaper publisher and senator
- Billy Davies (politician) (1884–1956), Welsh-born Australian member of the New South Wales Legislative Assembly and the Australian Parliament
- Sir William Arthian Davies (1901–1979), British lawyer and judge
- William Gwynne Davies (1916–1999), trade unionist and politician in Saskatchewan, Canada
- William H. Davies (1931–2017), justice of the Supreme Court of British Columbia

== Military ==
- William Davies (Virginia) (fl. 1770s), Continental Army officer in the American Revolutionary War
- William Davies (fl. late 18th century), British bullet-mould maker, founder of arms manufacturer Webley & Scott
- William W. Davies (USMC) (1900–1985), US Marine Corps general

== Religion ==
- William Davies (priest) (died 1593), Welsh Roman Catholic priest and martyr
- William W. Davies (1833–1906), leader of a schismatic Latter Day Saint group in Washington, US
- William David Davies (1897–1969), Welsh Presbyterian minister and theologian

== Science and medicine ==
- William Davies (palaeontologist) (1814–1891), British palaeontologist
- William Broughton Davies (1831–1906), Sierra Leonean medical doctor
- William Edward Davies (1917–1990), American geologist and caver
- William Davies (psychologist) (born 1950), British psychologist

== Sportspeople ==
=== Association football (soccer) ===
- William Davies (footballer, born 1854) (1854–1916), Oswestry F.C. and Wales international footballer
- William Davies (footballer, born 1873) (1873–1929), English footballer for Bolton Wanderers
- William Davies (footballer, born 1882) (1882–1966), Wrexham F.C., Blackburn Rovers F.C. and Wales international footballer
- Billy Davies (Welsh footballer) (1883–1960), Crystal Palace F.C., West Bromwich Albion F.C. and Wales international footballer
- William Davies (footballer, born 1884) (1884–1954), footballer for Stoke
- Willie Davies (footballer) (1900–1953), Swansea Town F.C., Cardiff City F.C., Notts County F.C., Tottenham Hotspur F.C. and Wales international footballer
- Taffy Davies (William Davies, 1910–1995), Welsh footballer with Watford
- Dai Davies (footballer, born 1948) (William David Davies, 1948–2021), Welsh goalkeeper
- Billy Davies (born 1964), Scottish footballer and manager
- Will Davies (footballer), English footballer

=== Cricket ===
- William Davies (English cricketer) (fl. 1844)
- William Davies (cricketer, born 1825) (1825–1868), English cricketer and clergyman
- Bill Davies (cricketer, born 1901) (1901–?), Welsh cricketer
- Bill Davies (cricketer, born 1906) (1906–1971), Welsh cricketer
- Billy Davies (cricketer, born 1936) (1936–2022), Welsh cricketer
- William Davies (cricketer, born 1972), English cricketer

=== Rugby ===
- William Davies (rugby) (1890–1967), Welsh rugby union and rugby league footballer of the 1910s and 1920s
- Will Davies (rugby) (fl. 1910s), rugby league footballer for Great Britain, Wales and Halifax
- Will Davies (rugby union) (1906–1975), Wales international rugby union player
- Billy Davies (Welsh rugby) (William H. J. Davies, fl. 1930s), rugby union and rugby league footballer
- Willie Davies (rugby) (1916–2002), Welsh dual-code rugby footballer
- Bill Davies (rugby league) (fl. 1940s), rugby league footballer for Wales, and Huddersfield
- Tony Davies (William Anthony Davies, 1939–2008), New Zealand rugby union footballer
- Billy Davies (rugby league, born 1948) (William Davies), English rugby league footballer

=== Other sports ===
- William Davies (sport shooter) (1881–1942), Canadian sport shooter who competed in Shooting at the 1912 Summer Olympics – Men's trap
- Bill L. Davies (1883–1959), Australian rules footballer
- Bill Davies (golfer) (1892–1967), English Ryder Cup golfer
- Bill Davies (Canadian football) (1916–1990)
- Bill Davies (footballer) (1930–2003), Australian footballer
- William Davies (wrestler) (1931–2020), Australian Olympic wrestler
- Willie Davies (tennis), British tennis player

== Other people ==
- William Davies (highwayman) (died 1689), known as the Golden Farmer and hanged in Surrey, England
- William Henry Davies (entrepreneur) (1831–1921), Canadian pork packer
- William Davies (master mariner) (1862–1936), sea captain and partner in Davies and Newman
- William Llewelyn Davies (1887–1952), chief librarian of the National Library of Wales, Aberystwyth
- William J. Davies (fl. 1900–1927), Welsh trade union leader
- William Davies (political writer) (born 1976), English writer, political and sociological theorist
- William Davies (barber-surgeon), English barber-surgeon and traveller
- Bill Davies (died 2016), English real estate developer, owner of Old Chicago Main Post Office

== Characters ==
- Will Davies, in the UK soap opera Hollyoaks, played by Billy Geraghty and Barny Clevely
- Billy Davis, in the UK TV soap opera River City, played by Gray O'Brien

== Other uses ==
- William Davies Company, former Canadian pork packing firm

== See also ==
- William Richardson Davie (1756–1820), governor of North Carolina
- William Davis (disambiguation)
- William Davies Evans (1790–1872), seafarer, inventor, and chess player
- William Rees-Davies (disambiguation)
- William Davies Thomas (1889–1954), professor of English at Saskatchewan and Swansea
- Billie Davies (born 1955), American jazz drummer and composer
