= Association for Psychological Therapies =

The Association for Psychological Therapies (APT) is a body providing recognition of excellence, training, resources, and accreditation to professionals working in Mental Health and related areas, mainly in the UK's National Health Service and Independent Health providers, but also in Canada and Australia.

== History ==
The Association for Psychological Therapies was founded in 1981 by Dr William Davies and Dr Derek Perkins, two clinical Psychologists based in HM Prison Birmingham, England. Initially the focus was on their respective specialisms, namely violence-prevention and sex-offending, although it rapidly expanded to Aaron T. Beck’s newly developed cognitive behavioral therapy (CBT) led initially by clinical psychologist Don Rowan.

During this stage courses were tutor-dependant, so a course on CBT led by one tutor might have a quite different emphasis from a CBT course led by another. With NHS teams increasingly commissioning multiple courses, especially CBT and Preventing Face-to-Face Violence, it became necessary to standardise course content so that commissioning organisations could rely on the same content being delivered across their teams, and that happening during the 1980s, with Paul Gilbert being largely responsible for developing the standardised CBT course.

APT's head office is now located in Thurnby, Leicestershire and was incorporated as a Private Limited Company under the name APT Training and Consultancy Ltd on 26 May 2006.

APT now employ over 50 tutors on a consultancy basis, and have provided professional development to over 125,000 people working in the helping professions.

In 2018 Birmingham and Solihull Mental Health NHS Foundation Trust, was found to have infringed a trademark registered by APT for the name ‘RAID’. Standing for Reinforce Appropriate, Implode Disruptive since 1990. The High Court judge, HH Melissa Clarke, found that the trademark had been infringed. The case, held in Birmingham, was the first ever to be heard by the Intellectual Property Enterprise Court outside of London.

Notable Past Tutors

Apart from Paul Gilbert who would later go on to found Compassion-Focused Therapy and become professor of Psychology at the University of Derby, other tutors at that time included Clive Hollin who would author amongst others the Handbook of Offender Assessment and Treatment, and the Psychology of Interpersonal Violence and become Professor at the University of Leicester, Neil Frude who would author Understanding Abnormal Psychology, found the Books on Prescription scheme and become Professor at Cardiff University, and Hazel Nelson who would author Cognitive Behavioral Therapy with Schizophrenia and Cognitive-behavioural Therapy with Delusions and Hallucinations A Practice Manual. APT Co-founder Derek Perkins had ceased active involvement by the end of 1983, but would continue to offer support and go on to become Head of Psychology at Broadmoor Secure Hospital and Professor of Psychology at Royal Holloway, University of London.

== Resources developed ==
Tools that APT have developed include The RAID® System to help those working with disturbed and challenging behaviour, with research showing a reduced number of incidents of challenging behaviour in medium secure LD wards. Other tools and resources developed by APT include the DICES® Risk Assessment and Management System, used by mental health professionals to assess and manage the risks of suicide, non-suicidal self-injury, self-neglect and vulnerability, violence to others, and sexual assault, and Davies's structured interview for assessing adolescents in crisis.

== Accreditation ==
The APT has its own accreditation system and does not seek accreditation from any outside bodies, instead relying on transparent self-accreditation that is intended to help anyone to see what attendees on its courses have achieved. This means that anyone is able to see the syllabus of any specific course and how it has been rated by attendees on two measure: Presentation quality, and Relevance.

APT is an independent organisation and has never sought affiliation with other bodies such as BABCP or the BPS. APT courses have no academic entry requirements as such, although they are designed for and attended by mental health professionals (mainly mental health nurses, psychologists and psychiatrists) in the NHS and major independent healthcare providers.

== Awards ==
APT was shortlisted for the Learning and Performance Institute, Learning Provider of The Year award in 2019 gaining the bronze award, and APT's Academic Director (Dr William Davies) was shortlisted for the Investors in People, Leader of the Year award in 2020.
