= Joseph Flavelle (disambiguation) =

Joseph Flavelle was a Canadian businessman.

Joseph Flavelle may also refer to:

- Sir (Joseph) Ellsworth Flavelle, 2nd Baronet (1892–1977)
- Sir (Joseph) David Ellsworth Flavelle, 3rd Baronet (1921–1985), of the Flavelle baronets

== See also ==
- Flavelle (surname)
