= William Davies (psychologist) =

British psychologist

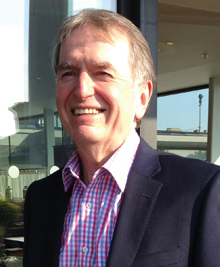
William Davies

William Davies is a British consultant psychologist and author who has focus his work towards helping individuals with anger, irritability, anger aggression and violence. He is co-founder (starting in 1981) of The Association for Psychological Therapies (APT), which helped train over 100,000 individuals.

== Early life and education ==
Davies studied psychology at University College London (graduating in 1972) and obtained his Doctorate in Clinical Psychology from the University of Birmingham in 1982. He started his career as a Psychologist at HM Prison Bristol, moving after eleven years to become Head of Forensic Psychology at Arnold Lodge Secure Unit in Leicester (1983). He then became the Head of Psychology at St Andrew's Healthcare Northampton in 1985, a national resource for patients requiring specialist input.

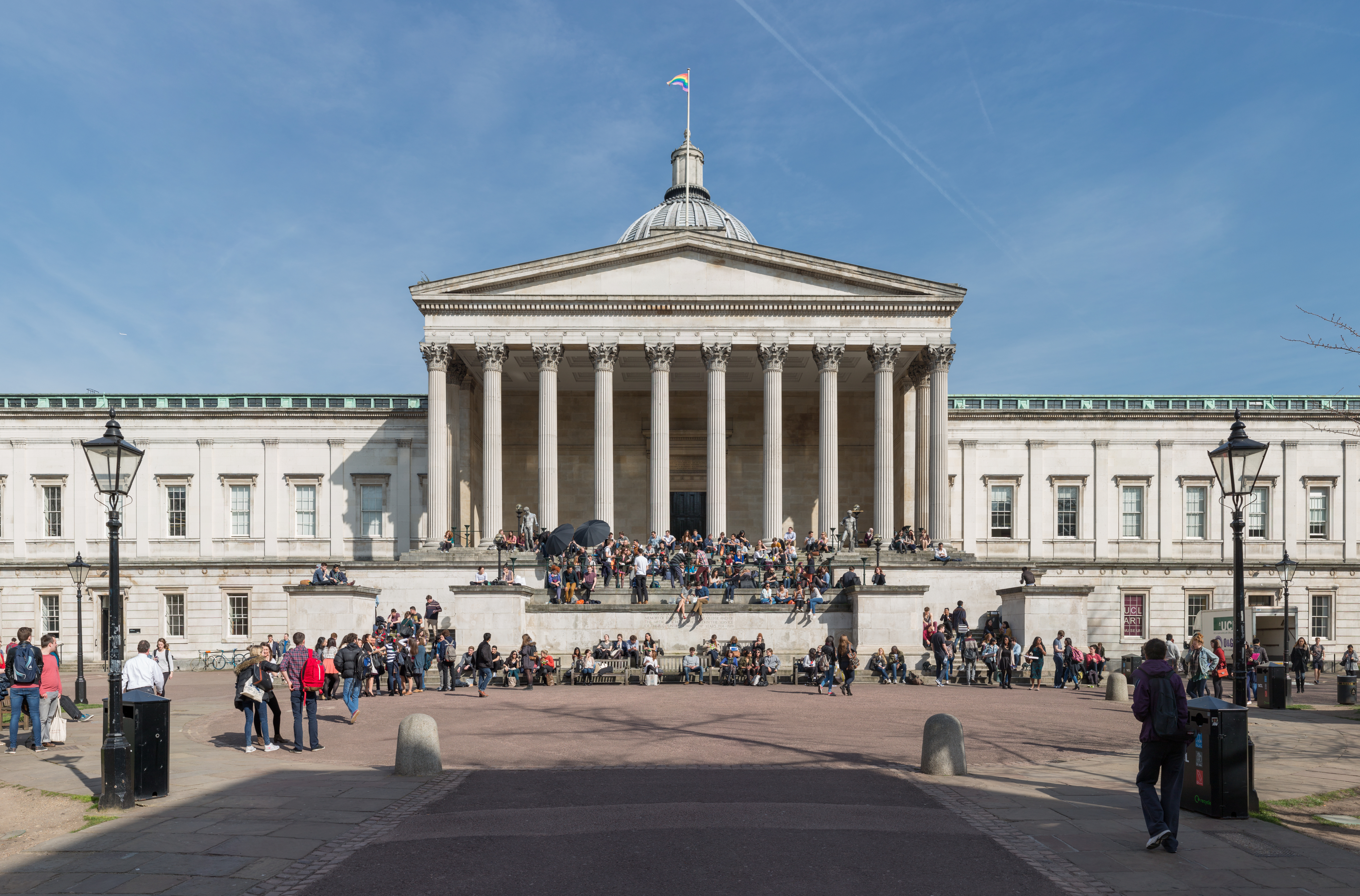
University College London, where William Davies graduated with his Doctorate in Clinical Psychology.

In his early career he was known for being the first psychologist professionally employed in top flight English football, and one of a handful of psychologists involved in the aftermath of the Piper Alpha disaster. William Davies, along with John Gardner, also became the first professional psychologists in English top flight football when Sir Bobby Robson employed them as consultants in 1981 at Ipswich Town F.C.. They then went on to work with Graham Taylor during his successful spell at Watford F.C. (At the time both teams included England internationals in Mick Mills, Terry Butcher and Paul Mariner for Ipswich, and John Barnes and Luther Blissett for Watford.) In the late 1980s, Davies was one of a handful of psychologists and psychiatrists heavily involved over a two-year period in seeing many of the survivors of the Piper Alpha oil rig disaster, mainly for assessing and quantifying any post-traumatic stress disorder.

He has designed a number of noted approaches to working in clinical settings, including The DICES Risk Assessment and Management System and The RAID Course for Working with Challenging Behaviour. These approaches have been incorporated by many healthcare providers, including Partnerships in Care, St Andrew's Healthcare and the UK National Health Service (NHS).

Davies has written various books, articles and textbook chapters. One of his books is Overcoming Anger and Irritability which has been selected to be included in Reading Well Books on Prescription, a series of books managing a variety of mental health conditions which are endorsed by health professionals and supported by public libraries throughout the UK.
