= William Henry Davies =

William Henry Davies may refer to:

- W. H. Davies (1871–1940), Welsh poet and writer
- William Henry Davies (entrepreneur) (1831–1921), English-born Canadian founder of the William Davies Company

== See also ==
- William Davies (disambiguation)
