= Belvidere School =

Belvidere School or Belvidere High School may refer to:

- Belvidere School, Shrewsbury, Shropshire, England
- Belvidere High School (Illinois), United States
- Belvidere High School (New Jersey), United States

== See also ==
- Belvidere (disambiguation)
- Belvidere High School (disambiguation)
