= RAID (in mental health) =

RAID (Reinforce Appropriate, Implode Disruptive) is a positive psychology least restrictive practice approach for working with people who exhibit challenging behaviour. The RAID approach is written by Dr William Davies and is published and distributed by the Association for Psychological Therapies. Over 20,000 professionals working in Mental Health and related areas are trained in the RAID approach, mainly in the UK and Ireland. It is now in its 11th edition.

== The RAID Model ==
The RAID model advocates a philosophy of care where professionals “play down disruptive behaviours as far as safety allows, and concentrate on recognising and reinforcing appropriate behaviour, so that it gradually displaces the disruptive behaviour”. It emphasises how the most extreme behaviours can be addressed through proactive encouragement of positive qualities and behaviours shown by an individual and clearly focuses on providing individuals with rewarding opportunities for progress.

The aim is for the professional to focus on ‘green’ (positive) behaviours and reduce opportunities for ‘red’ (challenging or less positive) behaviour thereby developing a therapeutic milieu. The process involves rewarding positive or ‘green’ behaviours in ways that help patients recognise their achievements; whilst ‘red’ (negative) behaviours are safely played down through the use of strategies such as distraction techniques.

As a proactive approach, the RAID Model contrasts with approaches such as extinction and punishment (as used in Operant Conditioning) in that the RAID Model allows you to act in the absence of extreme behaviour, whereas punishment and extinction only allow you to act when the extreme behaviour occurs (and to have approaches to extreme behaviour that relies upon the extreme behaviour happening is viewed by many as undesirable). The RAID model is usually viewed as an example of the Constructional Approach in Behaviour Modification and as such attempts to solve problems by building positive behaviors which displace the negative ones. This contrasts with the eliminative approach which focuses on the problem behavior (with the aim of eliminating it).

== History ==
The RAID Approach was written in 1990 by Dr William Davies, and established itself as a standard for setting and reinforcing positive behaviours in the UK. It was originally written as a positive approach to working with disturbed adolescents in secure conditions, but was quickly applied to people showing difficult and aggressive behaviour at any age, especially if they were in secure or residential facilities. Originally the approach described 13 relevant strategies for constructive working with such behaviour; the RAID acronym came later (1992), as a memory-aid for the general theme that underpins the strategies.

The acronym RAID (standing for Reinforce Appropriate, Implode Disruptive) was registered as a UK trademark in 1992. In January 2019, in the first case ever to be heard by the Intellectual Property Enterprise Court (IPEC) outside of London, the High Court judge, HH Melissa Clarke found that an NHS Foundation Trust had infringed the RAID trademark by using it to stand for Rapid Assessment Intervention and Discharge and they had to stop using it.

== Evidence ==
The RAID model has been measured through the Overt Aggression Scale - Modified for Neurorehabilitation (OAS-MNR) - and shown a decrease in aggressive behaviours by over 80% across a two year period. Research also shown that the RAID model significantly reduced the number of incidents of challenging behaviour on a medium secure LD ward, and a paper conducted by Dr Cheryl Knowles shown that that there was as significant increase in staff members’ confidence towards challenging behaviour - this was observed immediately post training, and maintained 4-months following the training.

== Training ==
Training in the RAID approach is delivered by the Association for Psychological Therapies and has been attended by over 20,000 professionals working for the UK's National Health Service (including Rampton Secure Hospital) and independent healthcare providers (including: St Andrew's Healthcare, The Priory Group, Cygnet Health Care, and Elysium Healthcare).
