= Paul Gilbert (disambiguation) =

Paul Gilbert (born 1966) is an American musician.

Paul Gilbert may also refer to:

- Paul Gilbert (actor) (1918–1976), American actor
- Paul Gilbert (psychologist) (born 1951), British clinical psychologist
