= Flavelle =

Flavelle is a surname. Notable people with the surname include:

- Ellsworth Flavelle (1892–1977), Canadian baronet
- John Flavelle (1863–1947), British tennis player
- Joseph Flavelle (1858–1939), Canadian businessman
- Flavelle baronets
- Aird Dundas Flavelle (1888–1973), Canadian lumber pioneer
