= Favell =

Favell is a surname and may refer to:

- Anthony Favell MBE (born 1939), British politician
- Doug Favell (born 1945), retired Canadian professional ice hockey goaltender
- Henry Favell (1845–1896), Anglican priest
- Les Favell (1929–1987), Australian cricketer

== See also ==
- Favell Lee Mortimer (1802–1878), English Evangelical author of educational books for children
- Weston Favell, former village in the English town of Northampton, Northamptonshire
- Weston Favell Academy for pupils aged 11 to 18
- Flavell
- Flavelle
