= The Reading Agency =

Charity in the United Kingdom

- CEO: Sue Wilkinson

The Reading Agency is a charity registered in England and Wales which promotes the benefits of reading among children and adults in UK, working with partners including public libraries, colleges and prisons.

== Operations ==
As of 2014 Sue Wilkinson served as the CEO. The Reading Agency is based out of The Society of Authors building in Holborn, London and describes its mission as "to tackle life's big challenges through the proven power of reading" like life skills and learning, health and wellbeing and isolation and loneliness.

Its main programme for children is the Summer Reading Challenge, which began in 1999. The Summer Reading Challenge is run in conjunction with public libraries and encourages children to read six books during the school summer holiday. Its 2026 summer challenge is music-related, and entitled "Read to the Beat". The Reading Agency also runs Chatterbooks children's reading groups in schools and libraries across the UK.

The Reading Agency has a wide range of programmes for adults. It works with well-known authors and publishers to create short books called Quick Reads which are then sold in bookshops and used in libraries, prisons, hospitals, colleges and adult-learning organisations. Quick Reads is embedded in the organisation's adult literacy programme, Reading Ahead, which runs in public libraries, prisons, adult learning organisations, colleges, trade unions and workplaces across the UK.

The Reading Agency runs World Book Night, an annual national celebration of reading held on 23 April. In 2018, 97% of participating organisations rated their experience of taking part in World Book Night as Excellent or Good.

The Reading Agency works closely with public libraries. Its Reading Well Books on Prescription scheme is delivered in partnership with Libraries Connected and is available in public libraries across England and Wales.

In 2018, The Reading Agency launched Reading Friends, a programme funded by the Big Lottery Fund. The goal is to tackle loneliness and isolation by starting conversations through reading. The Reading Agency is working with a wide range of partners across the UK to develop and test approaches which can then be rolled out more widely.

In addition, The Reading Agency supports over 4,000 reading groups providing them with advice and support and involving them in shadowing book prizes.
