= William Rees-Davies =

William Rees-Davies may refer to:

- William Rees-Davies (judge) (1863–1939), British politician, lawyer and colonial judge
- William Rees-Davies (Conservative politician) (1916–1992), British Conservative politician and MP

== See also ==
- William Rees (disambiguation)
- William Davies (disambiguation)
- Rees Davies, Welsh historian
