= Back bacon =

Type of bacon

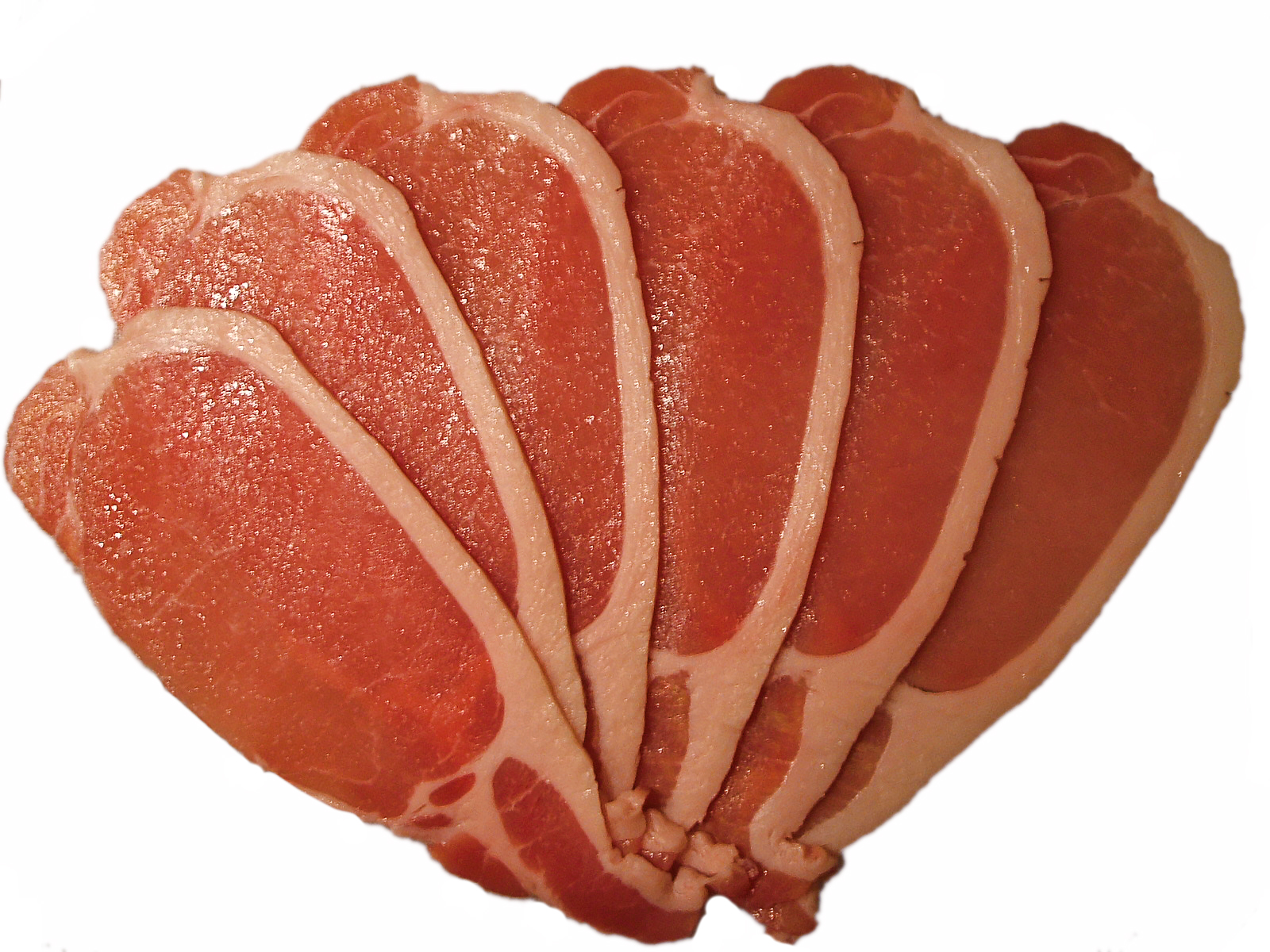
Cured uncooked back bacon, sliced

Back bacon is a cut of bacon that includes the pork loin from the back of the pig. It may also include a portion of the pork belly in the same cut. It is much leaner than side bacon, also called "streaky bacon", which is made from only the pork belly. Back bacon is derived from the same cut used for pork chops. It is the most common cut of bacon used in British and Irish cuisine, where both smoked and unsmoked varieties of bacon are found.

== "Canadian" bacon ==
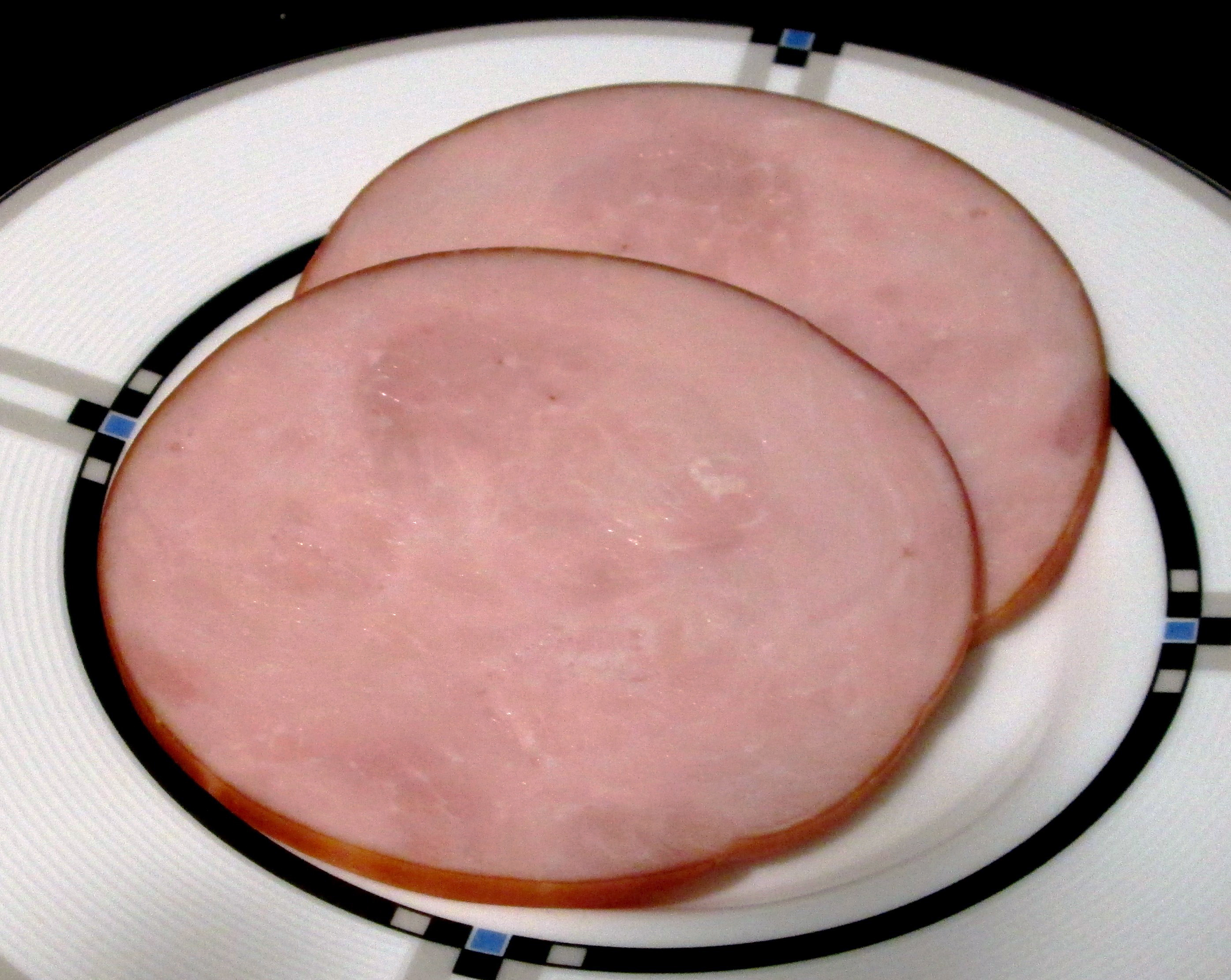
American "Canadian-style" bacon

Canadian bacon (or Canadian-style bacon) is the term commonly used in the United States for a form of back bacon that is cured, smoked and fully cooked, trimmed into cylindrical medallions, and sliced thick. The name was created when this product was first imported from Toronto to New York City. "Canadian" bacon is made only from the lean eye of the loin and is ready to eat. Its flavor is described as more ham-like than other types because of its lean cut.

The term "Canadian bacon" is not used in Canada, where bacon made from pork loin is known as "back bacon" while "bacon" alone refers to the same streaky pork belly bacon as in the United States. Peameal bacon is a variety of back bacon popular in Ontario where the loin is wet cured before being rolled in cornmeal (originally yellow pea meal); it is unsmoked.

== See also ==
- List of smoked foods
