= Nottinghamshire Healthcare NHS Foundation Trust =

NHS mental health trust

- Type: NHS Foundation Trust; Mental health trust
- Headquarters: Duncan Macmillan House; Nottingham; NG3 6AA
- Budget: £590m (2022/23)
- Hospitals: Rampton Hospital; Arnold Lodge
- Chair: Paul Devlin
- Chief executive: Ifti Majid
- Staff: 9,000 (approx)
- Website: www.nottinghamshirehealthcare.nhs.uk

Nottinghamshire Healthcare NHS Foundation Trust, based in Nottinghamshire, England, manages the UK's largest and most integrated Forensic High Secure facility Rampton Hospital near Retford (which covers specialist services such as the High Secure Personality Disorder (PD) pathway including Dangerous and Severe PD), High Secure Women's, High Secure Deaf, High Secure Learning Disability and Autistic as well as High Secure Men's Mental Health), two medium secure units, Arnold Lodge in Leicester and Wathwood Hospital in Rotherham, and a low Secure Unit, the Wells Road Centre at Mapperley in Nottingham.

The Trust provides Forensic services, Offender Health services, Community Mental Health services and community general physical health services across 200 plus sites throughout Nottinghamshire, Lincolnshire and Leicestershire.

== Foundation Trust ==
As a provider of high security mental health care it was directly accountable to the Secretary of State for Health, not to Monitor. For this reason it was described as an Equivalent NHS foundation trust, one of three. The other two are Mersey Care NHS Trust and West London Mental Health NHS Trust. It was awarded Foundation Trust status in March 2015.

== Services ==
It also provides health care at a number of prisons, and both mental health and community services across Nottinghamshire.

It runs John Eastwood Hospice and Millbrook Mental Health Unit in Sutton In Ashfield, Newark Community Rehabilitation Unit, Newark Clinic and Ollerton Clinic in Ollerton and Newark-on-Trent, Bassetlaw Hospice and Retford Clinic in Retford, Bassetlaw Hospital and Worksop Clinic in Worksop, Stapleford Care Centre, Hucknall Health Centre, Arnold Lodge in Leicester, Harworth Clinic in Doncaster, Mansfield Clinic and Mansfield Community Hospital, Dovecote Lane in Beeston, Nottinghamshire, Duncan Macmillan House (which is also the Trust Headquarters), Nottingham City Hospital St Francis Unit, Highbury Hospital, Lings Bar Hospital, the Thorneywood Unit, Hopewood Centre Nottingham, the Mary Potter Centre, Clifton Cornerstone, Park House Health & Social Care Centre, Meadows Health Centre, Broom Hill House, Wells Road Centre and the Strelley Health Centre in Nottingham.

Community health services, formerly provided by Nottinghamshire Community Health which was dissolved in April 2011, are now provided by County Health Partnerships which is part of the Trust.

Nottinghamshire Healthcare also provide a wide range of healthcare known as Offender Health, this covers Prisons in Nottinghamshire such as HMP Nottingham, HMP Whatton, HMP Lowdham Grange, HMP Ranby

Leicestershire area: HMP Leicester, HMP Gartree and HMP Stocken

Lincolnshire area: HMP Lincoln, HMP North Sea Camp and Morton Hall Immigration Removal Centre.

In October 2013 the Trust was asked by the Care Quality Commission to assist in rehousing residents of failing nursing homes in Nottingham.

It plans to acquire Mansfield Hospital, a 64-bed hospital site with three units for men with autism spectrum disorder and learning disabilities, from St Andrew's Healthcare in 2020.

== Controversies ==
In 2008 the Trust had to defend legal challenges to the smoke-free legislation for mental health establishments (G & B v Nottinghamshire healthcare NHS Trust, N v Secretary of State for Health). Three patients at the Rampton Hospital brought a case arguing that their human rights were violated by the smoking ban as the Rampton was essentially their home and the ban was incompatible with Article 8 of the European Convention on Human Rights. Smoking outside could not reasonably be arranged and the ban meant there could be no designated rooms for smoking. The claims were dismissed and the patients appealed the decision to the Court of Appeal, which also dismissed their claim. The Courts ruled that it was legitimate to restrict a person's Article 8 rights for the protection of health.

An investigation by the BBC’s Newsnight programme found half of 100 reviews of the trust on website Patient Opinion had been written by staff. The trust claimed that staff were writing on behalf of vulnerable patients – such as the elderly or those with learning difficulties – who would otherwise have been unable to comment.

Kier Group has a contract to deliver the future estates strategy; the first phase is the delivery of a new children's project providing adolescent in-patient beds, a psychiatric intensive care unit and an in-patient perinatal unit.

It was named by the Health Service Journal as one of the top hundred NHS trusts to work for in 2015. At that time it had 7780 full-time equivalent staff and a sickness absence rate of 5.58%. 63% of staff recommend it as a place for treatment and 55% recommended it as a place to work.

== See also ==
- List of NHS trusts
