= William Reese =

William Reese may refer to:

- William J. Reese (architect) (1943–2011), architect in The Hamptons area of New York
- William J. Reese (historian), historian of education and professor at the University of Wisconsin–Madison
- William L. Reese (1921–2017), American professor of philosophy
- William Oliver Reese (born 1987), American sailor who murdered a Japanese woman
- James W. Reese (1920–1943), American soldier and Medal of Honor recipient, went by his middle name "William"
- William Reese (murder victim), 4th of five victims of serial killer Andrew Cunanan
- Red Reese (1899–1974, William Bryan Reese), American college basketball coach and athletic director
- William S. Reese (1955–2018), antiquarian bookseller

== See also ==
- William Rees (disambiguation)
