= Belvidere High School =

Belvidere High School may refer to:

- Belvidere High School (Illinois), Belvidere, Illinois
- Belvidere High School (New Jersey), Belvidere, New Jersey

== See also ==
- Belvidere School, Shrewsbury, Shropshire, England–
