= James Kenneth Stephen =

English poet and royal tutor (1859–1892)

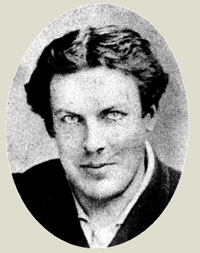
- Photograph of James Kenneth Stephen
- Born: 25 February 1859; London, England
- Died: 3 February 1892 (aged 32); St Andrew's Hospital, Northampton, England
- Occupation: Poet
- Known for: Jack the Ripper suspect Tutor of Prince Albert Victor

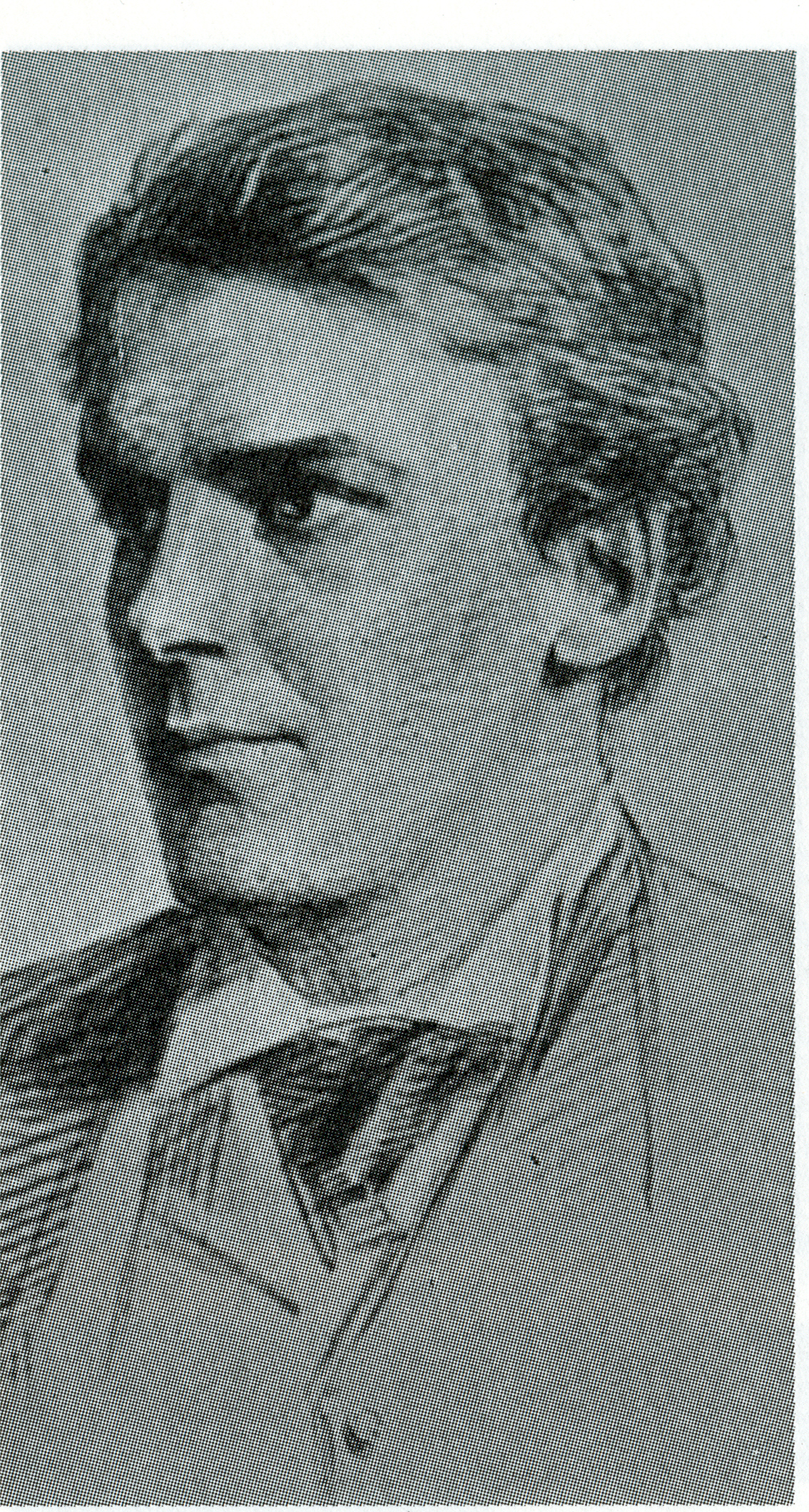
James Kenneth Stephen

James Kenneth Stephen (25 February 1859 – 3 February 1892) was an English poet, and tutor to Prince Albert Victor, eldest son of Albert Edward, Prince of Wales (later Edward VII).

Stephen was a son of the lawyer, judge, and philosopher Sir James Fitzjames Stephen, and a first cousin to Virginia Woolf (née Stephen). Both cousins had symptoms of bipolar disorder. Stephen was a member of the Apostles intellectual society. He served a term as President of the Cambridge Union Society in 1880, and he was made a Fellow of King's College in 1885. Following a serious head injury in late December 1886, he exhibited erratic emotional and mental behaviour, such as plunging a sword blade into bread and being amused at a medical prediction of his own death.

Stephen published two volumes of poetry in 1891, which satirized or parodied several notable writers. In November 1891, two of Stephen's brothers had him committed to the mental asylum St Andrew's Hospital after he demonstrated persecutory delusions concerning his imminent arrest. While still in the asylum, Stephen learned that his former student Prince Albert Victor had died. Stephen started refusing to eat, and he eventually starved himself to death. He died at the age of 32. The cause of death, according to the death certificate, was mania.

== Early life ==
James Kenneth Stephen was the second son of Sir James Fitzjames Stephen, barrister-at-law, and his wife Mary Richenda Cunningham. Known as 'Jem' among his family and close friends, he was first cousin to Virginia Woolf (née Stephen), and shared with his cousin symptoms of bipolar disorder that would affect him increasingly in later life.

As a King’s Scholar at Eton College, Stephen played the Eton Wall Game, representing the Collegers on St Andrew’s Day from 1874 to 1877. He served as Keeper of the College Wall in his final two years. He is commemorated in an annual toast: “In Piam Memoriam J.K.S.”

Stephen developed a reputation as an intellectual, and it was said that he spoke in a pedantic, but highly articulate and entertaining manner. At King's College, Cambridge, again as a King's Scholar, he continued a flourishing academic career: he was a member of the Apostles intellectual society, and President of the Cambridge Union Society in the Michaelmas term of 1880, and was made a Fellow of King's College in 1885.

== Relationship with Prince Albert Victor ==
In 1883, Stephen was chosen as the tutor and companion of Prince Albert Victor, Duke of Clarence and Avondale (nicknamed Eddy), the son of the Prince of Wales, and was expected to help raise the prince's poor academic standing before he attended Trinity College, Cambridge. Stephen was initially optimistic about tutoring the prince, but by the time the party were to move to Cambridge he had concluded, "I do not think he can possibly derive much benefit from attending lectures at Cambridge ... He hardly knows the meaning of the words to read".

Some biographers have suggested Stephen had romantic feelings for Albert Victor, but the nature of his relationship with Albert Victor is open to question. In 1972, writer Michael Harrison claimed that a sexual relationship began between tutor and pupil, ending when Prince Eddy was gazetted to the 10th Hussars on 17 June 1885 and resulted in a scandal of which, apparently, little evidence remains.

== Accident ==
Stephen suffered a serious head injury in an accident on 29 December 1886 while staying with Felix Cobbold, at Felixstowe Lodge, Felixstowe. He suffered a blow to his head and although his physical injuries soon healed, he nevertheless showed signs of psychological injury, exhibiting erratic emotional and mental behaviour. The injury may have exacerbated his bipolar disorder, a condition also affecting his cousin, Virginia Woolf. Separate descriptions of the accident exist. Virginia Woolf's biographer, Quentin Bell, says that the family tradition was that Stephen was struck in the head by some object from a moving train. Others claim that Stephen was injured when a horse he was riding shied and backed him into the moving vane of a windmill.

While Stephen originally appeared to have made a complete recovery, it was later discovered that his brain had been permanently damaged and his behaviour became increasingly erratic. Bell relates incidents of Stephen plunging the blade from a sword stick into bread; becoming deluded that he was a painter of great genius; rushing about dangerously in a hansom cab; and "'on another occasion he appeared at breakfast and announced, as though it were an amusing incident, that the doctors had told him that he would either die or go completely mad.'" Stephen became a patient of physician Sir William Gull, but his rapid mental and physical decline saw him drift from one project to the next with little focus or interest – outside of completing two volumes of poetry – before he was finally committed to a mental asylum.

== Poetry ==
In 1891, Stephen became a published poet under the initials J.K.S. with the collections Lapsus Calami and Quo Musa Tendis both released that year. Rudyard Kipling called him "that genius" and told how he "dealt with Haggard and me in some stanzas which I would have given much to have written myself". Those stanzas, in which Stephen deplores the state of contemporary writing, appear in his poem 'To R. K.':

Will there never come a season
Which shall rid us from the curse
Of a prose which knows no reason
And an unmelodious verse:
When the world shall cease to wonder
At the genius of an Ass,
And a boy's eccentric blunder
Shall not bring success to pass:

When mankind shall be delivered
From the clash of magazines,
And the inkstand shall be shivered
Into countless smithereens:
When there stands a muzzled stripling,
Mute, beside a muzzled bore:
When the Rudyards cease from Kipling
And the Haggards Ride no more.

"The Last Ride Together (From Her Point of View)" parodies Robert Browning's "Last Ride Together"; Lord Byron is parodied in "A Grievance"; and William Wordsworth in "A Sonnet":

Two voices are there: one is of the deep;
It learns the storm-cloud's thunderous melody,
Now roars, now murmurs with the changing sea,
Now bird-like pipes, now closes soft in sleep:
And one is of an old half-witted sheep
Which bleats articulate monotony,
And indicates that two and one are three,
That grass is green, lakes damp, and mountains steep:
And, Wordsworth, both are thine.

Stephen also took a satirical and occasionally nostalgic approach to his academic life and colleagues. Stephen wrote a satirical pastiche of Thomas Gray's "Ode on a Distant Prospect of Eton College" pillorying Eton for being Tory. Stephen was at Cambridge at the same time as the distinguished antiquarian and writer of ghost stories, M. R. James, and mentions him at the end of a curious Latin celebration of then-current worthies of 'Coll. Regale' (King's College):

Vivat J.K. Stephanus,
Humilis poeta!
Vivat Monty Jamesius,
Vivant A, B, C, D, E
Et totus Alphabeta!

Stephen's poem "The Old School List" from Quo Musa Tendis is included in the front pages of H.E.C. Stapleton's Eton School Lists 1853-1892, and the author refers to him in the preface as "an Etonian of great promise, who died only too early for his numerous friends". During his time at Eton, Stephen was a friend of Harry Goodhart (1858–1895), who became an England international footballer and later a professor at the University of Edinburgh. Goodhart is referred to as "one of them's wed" in the last verse of "The Old School List":

There were two good fellows I used to know.
--How distant it all appears!
We played together in football weather,
And messed together for years:
Now one of them's wed, and the other's dead
So long that he's hardly missed
Save by us, who messed with him years ago:
But we're all in the old School List.

A poem which gave him a reputation as a misogynist is "Men and Women," where he describes two people, a man and a woman, whom he does not know but to whom he takes a violent dislike. The first part, subtitled "In the Backs" (The Backs is a riverside area of Cambridge), concludes

...I do not want to see that girl again:
I did not like her: and I should not mind
If she were done away with, killed, or ploughed.
She did not seem to serve a useful end:
And certainly she was not beautiful.

== Breakdown and death ==
On 24 November 1891, Stephen's landlady found him standing naked at the window of his rooms in 18 Trinity Street, Cambridge. He had thrown his possessions into the street and was screaming, convinced that he was facing imminent arrest. His brothers Herbert and Harry came from London and accompanied him to St Andrew's Hospital, a mental asylum in Northampton, where he was committed. In January 1892, Stephen heard that his erstwhile pupil, the 28-year-old Prince Albert Victor, Duke of Clarence, had died of pneumonia at Sandringham, after contracting influenza. On hearing the news, Stephen refused to eat, and he died 20 days later, aged 32. The cause of death, according to the death certificate, was mania.

== Legacy ==
Stephen's outstanding record in the Eton Wall Game has become part of school legend: unverified accounts suggest that in his final year, he held up the whole of the opposing team single handed for five minutes until the rest of College Wall made it to the furrow. Ever after, the King's Scholars of Eton College have honoured his memory with a toast at the Christmas Sock Supper and other festive occasions – in piam memoriam J.K.S. – "to the pious memory of James Kenneth Stephen".

Stephen was recalled less honourably in a play by former Eton housemaster and Old Etonian, Angus Graham-Campbell, entitled Sympathy for the Devil. It premiered at the Eton Drama Festival in 1993 and was based on the notion that Stephen could have been Jack the Ripper.

Renewed interest in the 1888 Whitechapel murders had exploded in 1970 when British physician Thomas E. A. Stowell, allegedly working from the papers of Sir William Gull, made the veiled suggestion that Stephen's former pupil Prince Albert Victor, named only as "S", was the culprit. In 1972, writer Michael Harrison, working from this sensational theory, had come to the conclusion that "S" was not the prince, but actually Stephen who was committing the murders "out of a twisted desire for revenge" because of the dissolution of an alleged homosexual relationship between the two. Harrison contends that the breakup of the relationship with Eddy, combined with his mental decline, provoked Stephen to act out his own poem "Air: Kaphoozelum", in which the protagonist kills 10 harlots.

Forensic psychiatrist David Abrahamsen identified Stephen as matching his psychological profile of Jack The Ripper, claiming that Prince Eddy was an accomplice in his crimes and that the two enjoyed a mutually dependent relationship, with Stephen as the dominant partner.

This and similar theories have been dismissed on a number of counts, with some citing that Stephen would have been unable to commit any murders in London and return to Cambridge in time for lectures the following morning. Harrison had also connected Stephen's handwriting with the Ripper letters "From Hell" and "Dear Boss", and that the internal style of some of Stephen's poems matches some of the anonymous Ripper letters. This connection was rebutted by Thomas J. Mann in an article in the Journal of the World Association of Document Examiners (June 1975) in which Mann determines that only the Lusk letter is likely to be genuine and that the connection between Stephen's handwriting and that letter was minimal: "The overwhelming evidence is that the two do not match; and if the author of the Lusk letter was indeed Jack the Ripper, then J.K. Stephen was not that man."

The literary scholar Jane Marcus has suggested that Stephen was the model for the character of Percival in Virginia Woolf's 1931 novel The Waves.

== Collections ==
- Select Poems 1926 Augustan Books of Modern Poetry
- Lapsus Calami JKS Cambridge 1891
- Quo Musa Tendis Cambridge 1891
- Lapsus Calami and other verses 1896
