= Jonathan Anders =

English cricketer (born 1971)

Personal information
- Full name: Jonathan Anders
- Born: 25 January 1971 (age 55); Tunbridge Wells, Kent, England
- Batting: Right handed
- Bowling: Right-arm off break

Domestic team information
- Years: Team
- 1991–2002: Shropshire

Career statistics
Competition	List A
Matches	6
Runs scored	107
Batting average	17.83
100s/50s	–/1
Top score	51
Balls bowled	24
Wickets	–
Bowling average	–
5 wickets in innings	–
10 wickets in match	–
Best bowling	–
Catches/stumpings	–/–
- Source: CricketArchive, 2 July 2011

Jonathan Victor Anders (born 25 January 1971) was an English cricketer who played all his cricket for Shropshire.

He was born in Tunbridge Wells and educated at Belvidere School, Shrewsbury. He played at club level for Shrewsbury and Perkins cricket clubs.

His highest score of 51 came when playing for Shropshire in the match against Surrey Cricket Board. He played 26 games for Shropshire in the Minor Counties Championship. and 19 games for Shropshire in the MCCA Knockout Trophy.
