= Flavelle commission =

Canadian royal commission

Members of the Royal Commission on the University of Toronto at the Grange in 1906

The Flavelle commission, officially the royal commission on the University of Toronto, was a royal commission that studied university governance in Ontario. Joseph Flavelle led the commission, which focussed on governance of the University of Toronto. It made its report in 1906.

The commission was formed in response to accusations that universities in the province were subject to political influence. It made two central recommendations. First, it recommended that a board, as opposed to the provincial government, control university decision making. Second, it recommended that universities adopt a bicameral governing structure. According to this recommendation, one chamber of the university governing body—now often called the senate—would be responsible for academic matters. The other, called the board of governors, would handle financial matters. This model of university governance, set out in The University Act, 1906, is ubiquitous in contemporary Canadian higher education.
