= William Rees =

William Rees may refer to:

== Sports ==
- William Rees (rugby) (1899–1968), rugby union and rugby league footballer of the 1920s and 1930s
- William Lee Rees (1836–1912), English-born New Zealand cricketer, politician and lawyer
- Billy Rees (1924–1996), association footballer of the 1940s and 1950s

== Religious figures ==
- William Rees (priest and writer) (1859–1936), earlier Welsh Anglican priest
- William Jenkins Rees (1772–1855), Welsh cleric and antiquary
- William Rees (archdeacon of St Asaph) (1905–?), later Welsh Anglican priest

== Others ==
- William Rees (Liberal politician), in 1390 MP for Norfolk
- William Hurst Rees (1917–2004), British surveyor and member of the Lands Tribunal
- William James Rees (1913–1967), British hydroid and cephalopod researcher
- William E. Rees (born 1943), originator of "ecological footprint" concept
- William Rees (cinematographer) (1904–1961), American cinematographer
- William Rees (Gwilym Hiraethog) (1802–1883), writer
- William Rees (veterinary surgeon) (1928–2018), Chief Veterinary Officer of the United Kingdom, 1980–1988
- William Gilbert Rees (1827–1898), explorer, surveyor, and early settler in Central Otago, New Zealand

== See also ==
- William Rees-Mogg (1928–2012), British journalist, writer and politician
- William Reese (disambiguation)
- William Rees-Davies (disambiguation)
