= William Henry Davies (entrepreneur) =

British-Canadian businessman

William Henry Davies (23 June 1831 – 21 April 1921) was a British-born Canadian businessman who established a company that packed and shipped salt pork from Toronto to the United Kingdom. The William Davies Company grew to be the largest pork packer in the British Empire, giving Toronto its nickname of "Hogtown", and introducing peameal bacon.

== Life and career ==
Davies was born in Wallingford, England, the son of Charles Davies and Rachel Smallbone. He left school at 12 to become an apprentice. Within a decade, he had his own meat-curing and retail business in Reading, England. Davies married Emma Holtby in 1853, and the two immigrated to Toronto in 1854.

He started the William Davies Company in 1857. In 1860, he began exporting bacon to England. In 1864, Davies had his own building for cutting and smoking meats. In 1874, a new building was built near the mouth of the Don River.

In 1892, Davies took on Joseph Flavelle as a partner in the business. The partnership flourished to the point where the business slaughtered 500,000 pigs per year, and the two became millionaires.

In 1909, Davies retired from the business, but he retained a share of the company. In 1919, Davies' grandson Edward Carey Fox bought the company, but it later faltered and was merged into Canada Packers (now Maple Leaf Foods) in 1927.

Once one of Canada's largest food producers, the William Davies Company not only graced its home city with the "Hogtown" nickname (or epithet), but William Davies also introduced peameal bacon, which continues to be popular in Canada.

== In popular culture ==
In "Murdoch in Hogtown" (January 26, 2026), episode 13 of season 19 of the Canadian television period detective series Murdoch Mysteries, Davies is shown supervising the operation of the William Davies Company. Peameal bacon, which Davies invented, features in the episode. Davies is played by Jack Nicholsen.
