= St Andrew's Hospital =

- St Andrew's Healthcare
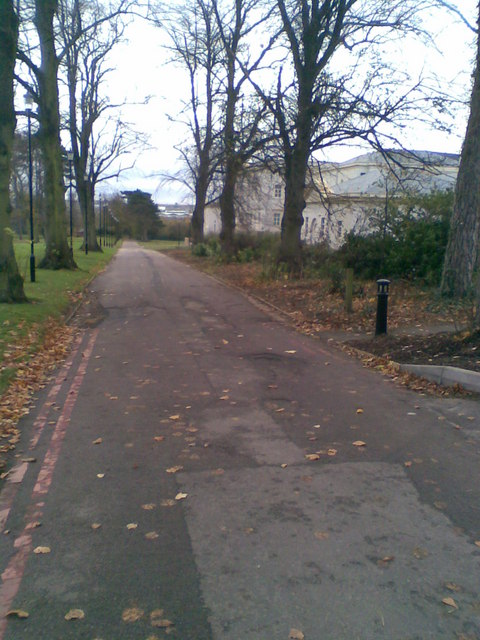
- St Andrews Hospital

- Shown in Northamptonshire

Geography
- Location: Northampton, Northamptonshire, England
- Coordinates: 52.238°N 0.874°W

Organisation
- Care system: Private
- Type: Specialised
- Affiliated university: University of Northampton

History
- Founded: 1838

Links
- Website: www.stah.org
- Lists: Hospitals in England

St Andrews Hospital is a mental health facility in Northampton, England. It is managed by St Andrew's Healthcare.

== History ==
=== Formation ===
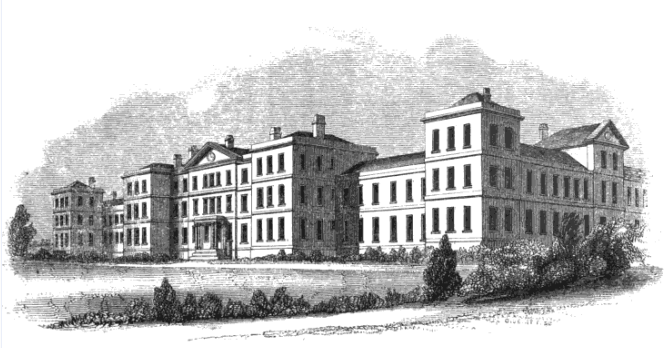
Engraving of Northampton General Lunatic Asylum, 1849

The facility was founded by public subscription for "private and pauper lunatics" and opened as the Northampton General Lunatic Asylum on 1 August 1838. Thomas Octavius Prichard was appointed as the hospital's first medical superintendent: he was one of the pioneers of "moral management", the humane treatment of the mentally ill. The chapel was designed by Sir George Gilbert Scott and opened in 1863.

It became St Andrew's Hospital for Mental Diseases in the 1930s and elected to remain a charity rather than joining the National Health Service in 1948.

== Controversies ==
=== Dispatches exposure ===
In 2017, Channel 4 Dispatches aired Under Lock and Key, which highlighted that people with learning disabilities and autism were being kept in secure hospitals, in concerning conditions. The show detailed the experiences of several former patients at St Andrew's Hospital. Concerns included the use of restraint, seclusion and frequent sedation, with one patient remaining mostly in segregation for 22 months, in a room with minimal natural light. It was also revealed that four patients had died on one ward between October 2010 and May 2011 and that all had been prescribed Clozapine. Information that highlighted the role of the use of Clozapine in the deaths of these patients was not shared with the coroner at the initial inquest into one of the deaths. After the programme's broadcast, St Andrew's issued a statement refuting the allegations that appeared in the programme.

=== Girls on the Edge ===
In 2018 the Child and Adolescent Mental Health Services at the hospital was featured in a BBC Two documentary entitled Girls on the Edge. The programme followed three families whose adolescent daughters had been sectioned under the Mental Health Act 1983 to protect them from harming themselves. The film, made by Dragonfly Film and Television, won a Mind Media Award.

=== Walsall Council legal action ===
In 2018, the father of a girl who has autism and anxiety won a court case against Walsall Council, who had sought to prevent him from publicising details of the conditions his daughter was being detained under, in St Andrew's Hospital. His daughter was being kept in a 12 ft by 10 ft room, with a mattress and chair, with family members being forced to communicate with her via a hole in the metal door, which she was also being fed through. An earlier assessment had concluded that "the current setting is not able to satisfactorily meet her individual care needs" and a recommendation was made suggesting she be moved to a residential setting in the community with high support, but she continued to remain in the conditions, whilst her father was forced to defend legal action taken by Walsall Council to stop him publicly discussing his daughter and the conditions she was being detained under, at St Andrew's Hospital.

St Andrew's Chief Executive, Katie Fisher, has spoken publicly about the challenges the hospital faces when discharging patients, as there is a lack of suitable community places for people to move on to. In May 2019, Fisher told the BBC that the organisation "has up to 50 patients stuck in secure units".

== Notable patients ==
- Malcolm Arnold, British composer
- Frank Bruno, boxer
- John Clare, the "Northamptonshire peasant poet"
- Louis de Zoysa, convicted of the 2020 murder of Matt Ratana, a Metropolitan Police sergeant
- Frank Foster, Warwickshire and England cricketer
- Violet Gibson, Irish woman who shot Mussolini
- Josef Hassid, the Polish violinist
- Lucia Joyce, daughter of James Joyce, stayed here from 1951 until her death in 1982
- The Ven. David Roberts, Archdeacon of Monmouth from 1926 to 1930
- George Gilbert Scott junior, architect (son of the designer of the chapel)
- Gladys Spencer-Churchill, Duchess of Marlborough, spent her last 15 years of life in the hospital
- James Kenneth Stephen, poet

== Sources ==
- Foss, Arthur; Trick, Kerith Lloyd Kinsey (1989), St. Andrew's Hospital Northampton: the first 150 years, 1838-1988, Granta Editions, ISBN 0906782449
