= Peameal bacon =

Type of Canadian bacon

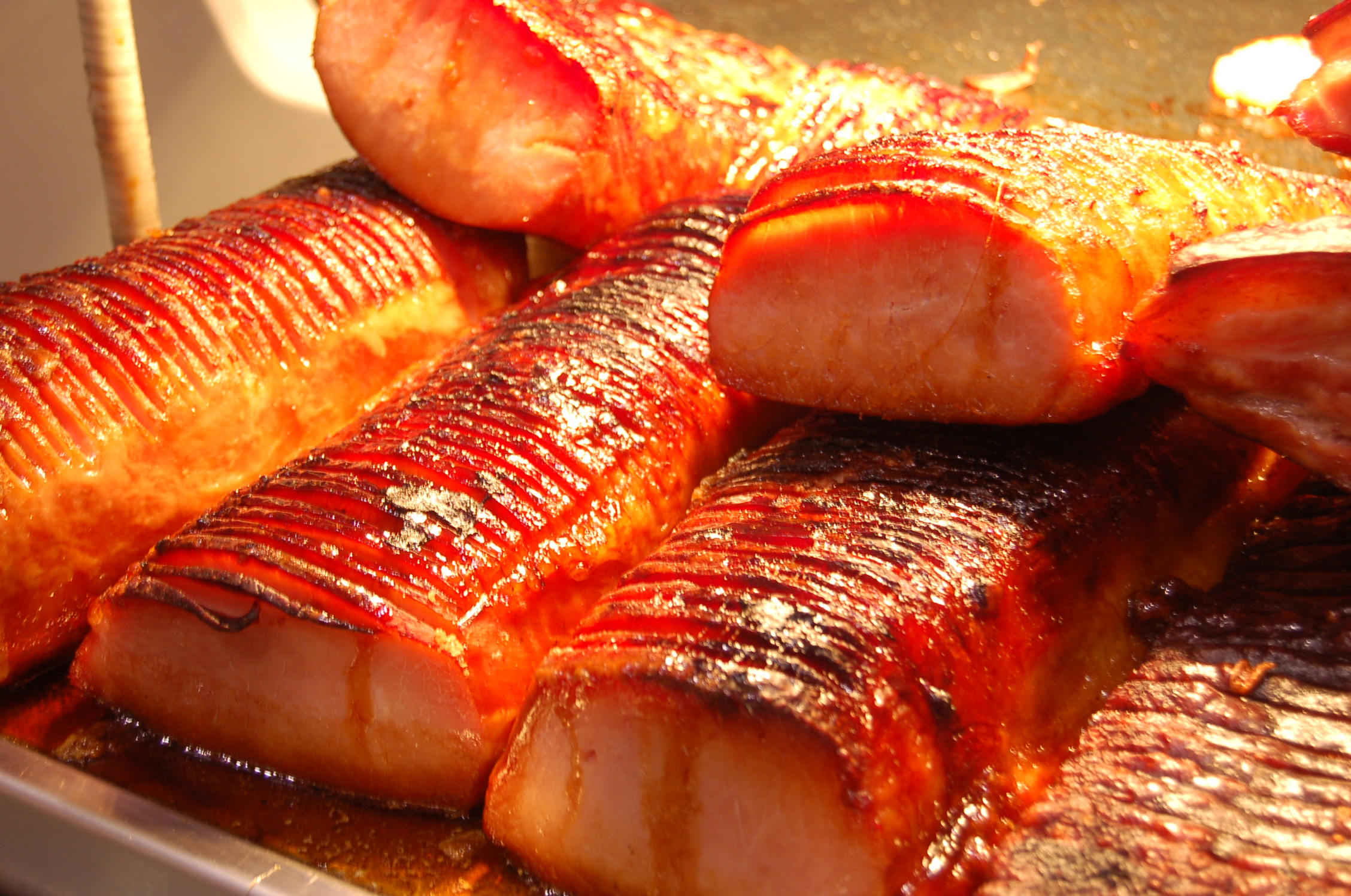
- Peameal bacon
- Place of origin: Canada
- Region or state: Southern Ontario
- Associated cuisine: Cuisine of Canada
- Main ingredients: Pork loin
- Food energy (per 100 g serving): 157 kcal (660 kJ)

Peameal bacon (French: bacon de dos, also known as cornmeal bacon [bacon de maïs]) is a wet-cured, unsmoked bacon made from trimmed lean boneless pork loin rolled in cornmeal. It is found mainly in Ontario. Toronto pork packer William Davies, who moved to Canada from England in 1854, is credited with its development.

The name "peameal bacon" derives from the historic practice of rolling the cured and trimmed boneless loin in dried and ground yellow peas to extend shelf life. Since the end of World War I, it has been rolled in ground yellow cornmeal.

Peameal bacon sandwiches, consisting of cooked peameal bacon on a Kaiser roll and sometimes topped with mustard or other toppings, are often considered a signature dish of Toronto, particularly from Toronto's St. Lawrence Market.

== Description and name ==
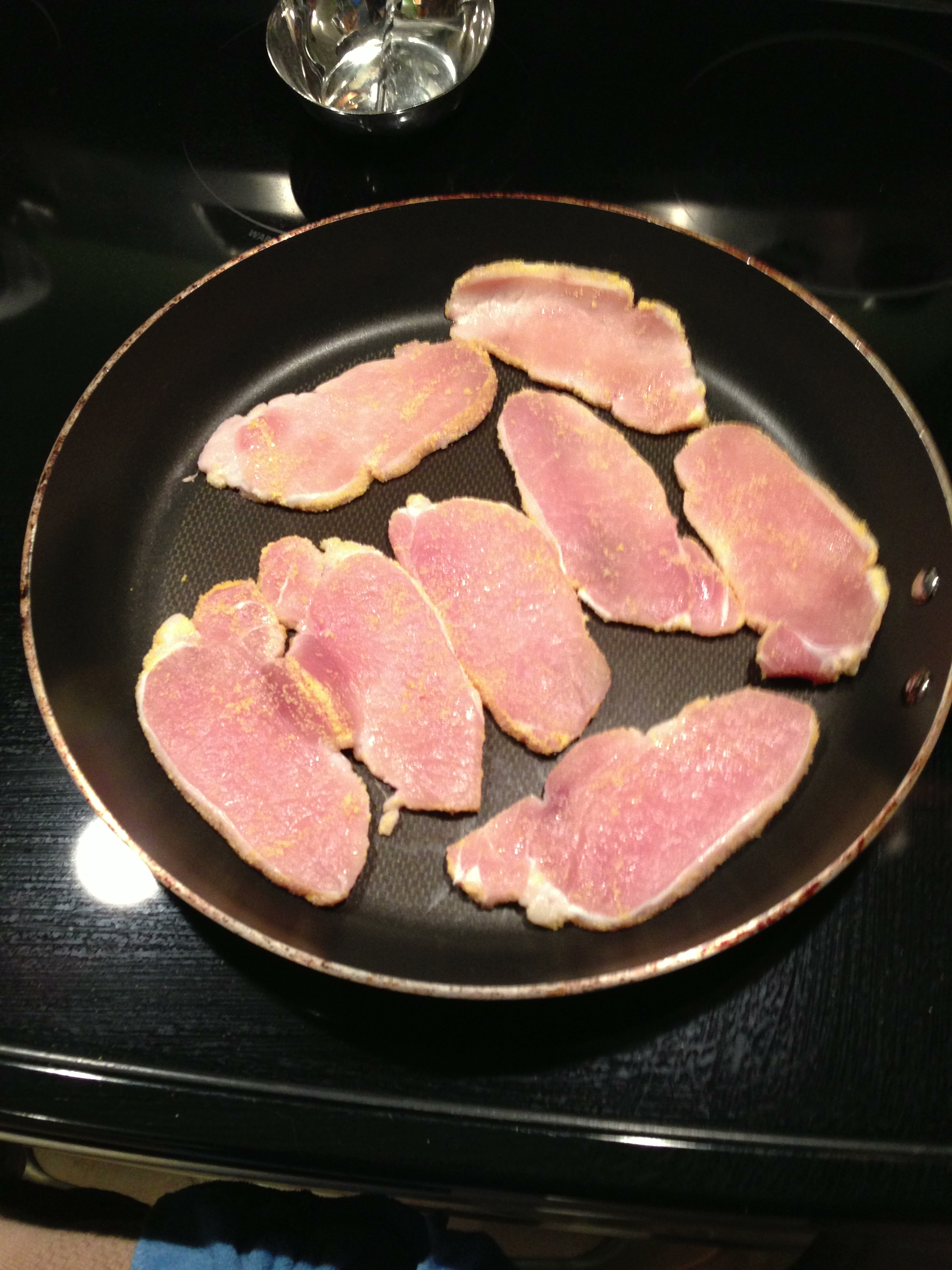
Peameal bacon

Peameal bacon is a cut of unsmoked bacon. It is made from centre-cut pork loin, trimmed of fat, wet-cured in a salt-and-sugar brine and rolled in cornmeal. It can be sliced and cooked on a grill, griddled, or fried. Alternatively, it can be roasted, then sliced and served. The brining process makes it nearly impossible to overcook. Also, the low fat content keeps it juicy, and the cornmeal gives it a crispy edge.

Cooked peameal bacon has a mild salty-sweet flavour and tastes more like fresh ham (when compared to smoked back bacon or side bacon). The cooked slices have been described as resembling small pork cutlets. It is eaten for breakfast, lunch, or dinner, and served either as slices or an ingredient in a pork dish.

The name 'peameal' comes from the dried yellow peas that were ground into meal and packed around the meat to preserve it in the Victorian era. This has since been replaced by cornmeal, but the original name remains. Peameal bacon is rarely found outside of Southern Ontario, and is often simply referred to as "back bacon". Similarly, a peameal bacon sandwich is often called "back bacon on a bun".

Some Americans refer to peameal bacon as 'Canadian bacon'. However, 'Canadian-style bacon' or 'Canadian back bacon' are terms used by the U.S.-based North American Meat Institute for an American style of smoked back bacon. This may be sold in U.S. supermarkets as 'Canadian bacon', but is not Canadian. 'American bacon' is an American term for side bacon, which is also known as streaky bacon.

== History ==
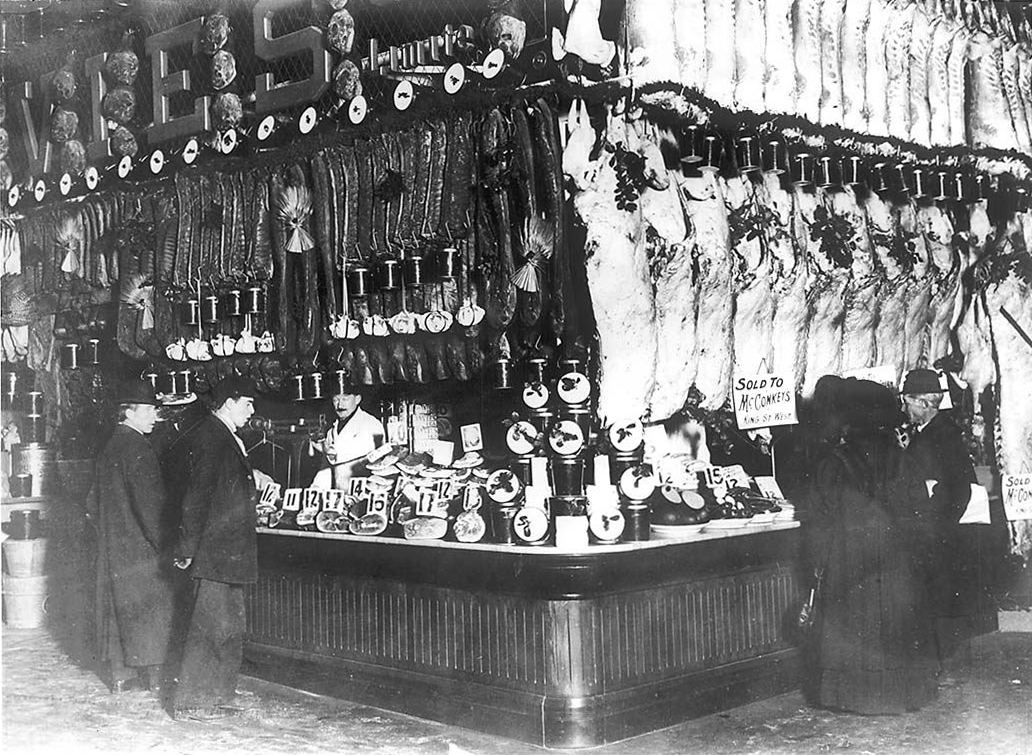
William Davies Company stall at St. Lawrence Market, c. 1911

The origins of peameal bacon have not been firmly established. Curing pork with brine has been practised for centuries, in many parts of the world. One such process was the Wiltshire cure used in England from 1765 or earlier. (Note: The manufacture of Wiltshire bacon was described in 1883 as involving sides of pork being cooled, cured through brine injection and salting, "mopped" with peameal and smoked.) Peameal bacon has been linked to pork packer William Davies and the Toronto-based William Davies Company, though it is uncertain if Davies or an employee invented the process, or if the company otherwise acquired it. Davies immigrated to Canada from Britain in 1854, and set up a shop in Toronto's St. Lawrence Market.

According to Toronto's oral history, Davies sent a side of brine-cured pork loins to relatives in England. To help preserve this shipment, he packed it in ground yellow peas. This was well received, and Davies continued rolling cured loins in peameal to extend shelf life. The William Davies Company expanded, forming Canada's first major chain of food stores, and becoming the largest pork exporter in the British Empire. By the early 1900s, the company's Front Street plant processed nearly half a million hogs per year. This contributed to Toronto's longstanding nickname of "Hogtown". Following World War I, cornmeal replaced the peameal crust, due to the former's availability and improved refrigeration practices.

== Sandwiches ==
In the 1960s, customers of Joe Homer's St. Lawrence Market butcher shop opted for the centre cut of cured peameal loins, leaving him with the ends. Homer and Elso Biancolin, who ran a bakery shop at the market, sliced and fried the bacon ends and sold them on buns. Biancolin's sons, Robert and Maurice, expanded the family's Carousel Bakery during the market's 1977 renovation, and their featured peameal bacon sandwich on a fresh Kaiser roll received national and international attention from food critics and TV chefs.

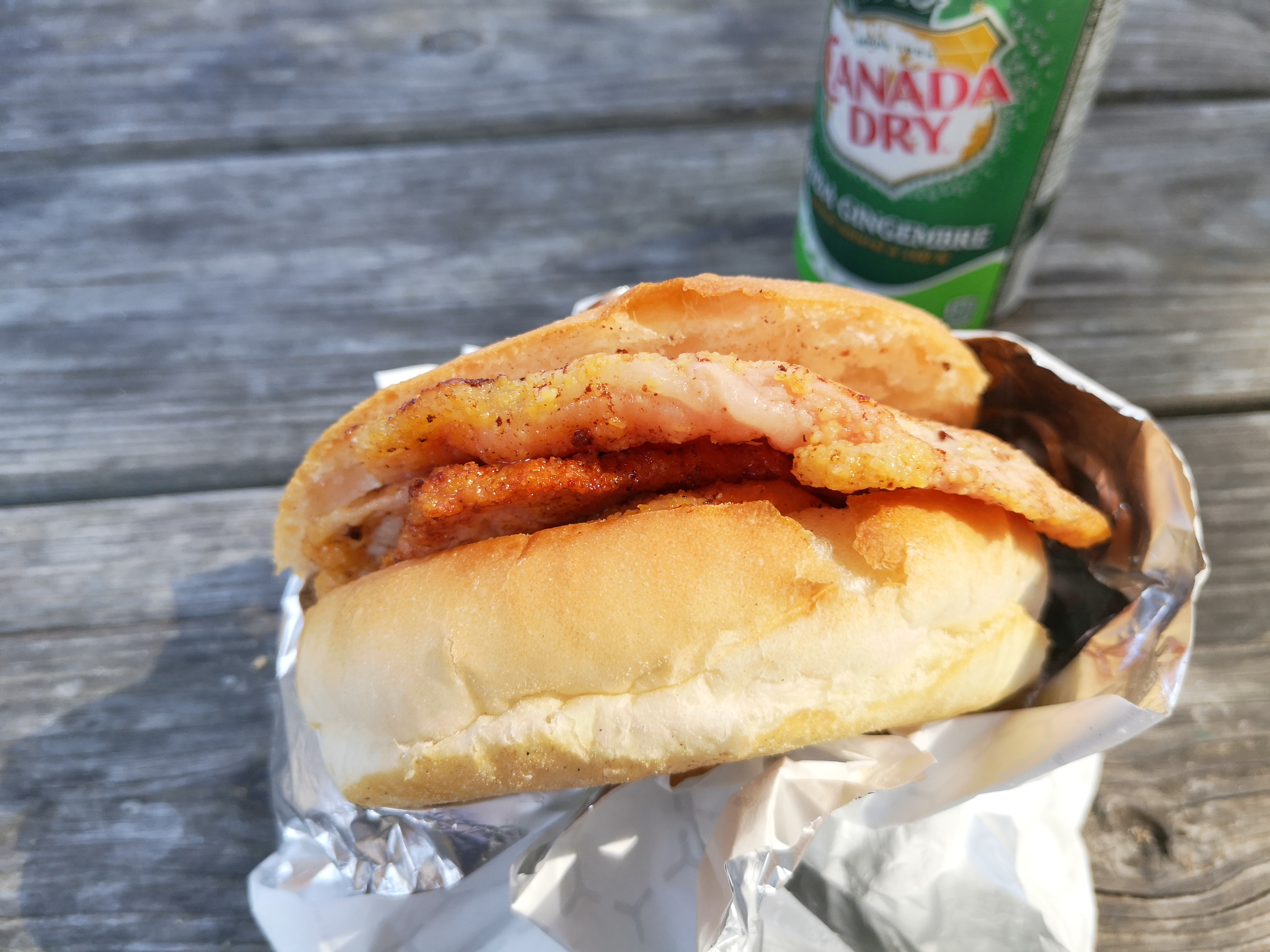
Slices of peameal bacon served on a soft roll bun

The Carousel Bakery's peameal bacon sandwich is simple, without complicated sauces, toppings or layers. It is composed of 1/8-inch (3.2 mm) slices of peameal bacon cooked on a griddle long enough to crisp, drizzled with honey mustard, and served on a soft fresh roll. There are options to add an egg or side bacon.

== In popular culture ==
Peameal bacon sandwiches were served at the inaugural Canadian Comedy Awards in 2000. In 2016, the peameal bacon sandwich was named Toronto's signature dish. This was announced by Mayor John Tory at a local food festival with several versions offered. Peameal bacon sandwiches were included in a wager between Tory and Oakland Mayor Libby Schaaf during the 2019 NBA Finals.

== Nutrition ==
Because peameal bacon is lean, it compares favourably to side bacon and is less processed than turkey bacon. While turkey bacon has a healthier image, popular brands have higher sodium and carbohydrates from added corn syrup. Nutritionist Theresa Albert compared 100-gram (3.5 oz) samples (about 4 slices of side bacon or turkey bacon, and 2 thick slices of peameal bacon):

- turkey bacon: 382 calories, 2,285 mg of sodium, 3.1 g of carbohydrates and 28 g of fat
- side bacon: 541 calories, 1,717 mg of sodium, 1.4 g of carbohydrates and 42 g of fat
- peameal bacon: 157 calories, 904 mg of sodium, 1.7 g of carbohydrates and 7 g of fat

In 2018, a laboratory analysis was conducted on Carousel Bakery's 241-gram (0.531 lb) peameal bacon sandwich. It found the sandwich to have 499 calories, 2,520 mg of sodium, 49 g of carbohydrates, 8 g of fat, and 57 g of protein. Dietitian Shannon Crocker felt the calories and protein would make it a satisfying meal, but the sodium was 10% above the maximum recommended daily limit.

== See also ==
- Cuisine of Toronto
