= William Davies (barber-surgeon) =

English traveller (fl. 1598–1614)

William Davies (fl. 1598–1614) was an English barber-surgeon and traveller.

== Life ==
Davies was a native of Hereford, and became a barber-surgeon of London. He states that he was a gentleman by birth, and served in many naval and military operations.

On 28 January 1597–8, he sailed in a trading-ship (the Francis) from Saltash, Cornwall, and reached Cività Vecchia, the port of Rome. He subsequently visited Algiers and Tunis. On leaving Tunis his ship was attacked by six galleys of the Duke of Florence. Davies was taken to Leghorn, where he worked as a slave for eight years and ten months. At the end of that period Robert Thornton, the English captain of a Florentine ship (the Santa Lucia), begged the Duke's permission to take Davies with him as the doctor on an expedition to the river Amazon. The Duke demanded five hundred crowns as security for Davies's working under Thornton's orders, and the money was paid by William Mellyn of Bristol, who happened to be in Italy. Before leaving Leghorn the Duke granted Davies an audience and received him with great kindness. Davies attributes the geniality of his reception to his perfect acquaintance with Italian.

On returning to Italy, Davies's ship was attacked by an English pirate, and an English sailor (Erasmus Lucas of Southwark) was fatally wounded. Davies landed with the body at Leghorn, and, declining to avail himself of the services of Roman Catholic priests, proceeded to bury it by himself. While thus engaged he was arrested by the agents of the Inquisition; lived on bread and water in an underground unlighted dungeon for sixteen days, and after a first examination was removed to a large open prison.

An English shipowner, Richard Row of Milbroke, helped him to escape, and after sailing about the Mediterranean he reached London in 1614 and wrote a full and interesting account of his travels, published in that year under the title of A True Relation of the Travailes … and Captivitie of William Davies. It was reprinted in 1746 in Osborne's Travels and Voyages, vol. i.

== Bibliography ==
- Baigent, Elizabeth (2004). "Davies, William (fl. 1598–1614), traveller". In Oxford Dictionary of National Biography. Oxford University Press.
- Lee, Sidney (1888). "Davies, William (fl.1614)" . In Stephen, Leslie (ed.). Dictionary of National Biography. Vol. 14. London: Smith, Elder & Co. p. 161.
