= William Davies (footballer, born 1873) =

English footballer

Personal information
- Full name: William Hornby Davies
- Date of birth: 1873
- Place of birth: Blackley, England
- Date of death: 1929 (aged 56–57)
- Position: Wing half

Senior career*
Years	Team	Apps	(Gls)
1895–1896	Bolton Acme		
1896–1897	Henley		
1897–1898	Halliwell Rovers		
1898–1899	Bolton Wanderers	21	(0)
1899–1900	Bedminster		
1900–1904	Bristol Rovers		
1904	Staple Hill		
Total		21	(0)
- * Club domestic league appearances and goals

William Hornby Davies (1873–1929) was an English footballer who played in the Football League for Bolton Wanderers.
