= Reading Well Books on Prescription =

British well-being scheme

Reading Well Books on Prescription is a scheme in England to encourage people to manage their health and well-being by reading self-help books. The scheme was launched in 2013 by the charity The Reading Agency and the Society of Chief Librarians with funding from Arts Council England. The scheme initially provided reading lists for common mental health conditions (including anger, anxiety, depression, phobias, and self-harm), but extended this offer to include reading lists for mood-busting books, dementia, young people, and long term conditions.

The books on the lists are endorsed by health experts, and can be recommended by GPs or other health professionals, or borrowed without referral from public libraries in England. The scheme was based on a similar scheme in Wales, which was set up by Professor Neil Frude in 2003 (the Welsh assembly made it available nationally in 2005). Neil Frude said "The doctors are already there, the books are already there and so are the libraries. It just needed joining them up."

The scheme is supported by evidence which suggests reading can improve health and wellbeing and its effectiveness is evaluated annually.

Results show that in its first year the scheme reached 275,000 people, and libraries saw a 113% increase in loans of the titles on the list.

== Support ==
The scheme has the support of bodies including the Royal College of General Practitioners, Royal College of Nursing, and Mind. In January 2015, the scheme was expanded to include books to assist people affected by dementia, whether directly or as carers.

== Libraries ==
Local public library systems are supporting the scheme in various ways, including making the books available in branches, providing access through their catalogues, and promoting the lists and the books. In 2015, the findings of a two-year evaluation report into the Reading Well Books on Prescription scheme were published; it claimed that there had been a 97% increase in UK library loans of mental health self-help books, and a 346% increase in the number of books for people with dementia borrowed from libraries in England.

== General practice ==
Some general practices are informing patients about the Reading Well lists as part of their patient information websites.

== Book lists ==
A book list on common mental health conditions in adults was created in 2013. It was followed by a list for people with dementia and their carers in 2015, and the "Reading Well for Young People" list, aimed at the 13–18 age group and including fiction such as The Curious Incident of the Dog in the Night-Time, in 2016.
