= Compassion-focused therapy =

System of psychotherapy

Compassion-focused therapy (CFT) is a system of psychotherapy developed by Paul Gilbert that integrates techniques from cognitive behavioral therapy with concepts from evolutionary psychology, social psychology, developmental psychology, Buddhist psychology, and neuroscience. According to Gilbert, "One of its key concerns is to use compassionate mind training to help people develop and work with experiences of inner warmth, safeness and soothing, via compassion and self-compassion."

== Overview ==
A central therapeutic technique of CFT is compassionate mind training, which teaches the skills and attributes of compassion. Compassionate mind training helps transform problematic patterns of cognition and emotion related to anxiety, anger, shame and self-criticism.

Biological evolution forms the theoretical backbone of CFT. Humans have evolved with at least three primal types of emotion regulation system: the threat (protection) system, the drive (resource-seeking) system, and the soothing system. CFT emphasizes the links between cognitive patterns and these three emotion regulation systems. Through the use of techniques such as compassionate mind training and cognitive behavioral therapy (CBT), counseling clients can learn to manage each system more effectively and respond more appropriately to situations.

Compassion-focused therapy is especially appropriate for people who have high levels of shame and self-criticism and who have difficulty in feeling warmth toward, and being kind to, themselves or others. CFT can help such people learn to feel more safeness and warmth in their interactions with others and themselves.

Numerous methods are used in CFT to develop a person's compassion. For example, people undergoing CFT are taught to understand compassion from the third person, before transferring these thought processes to themselves.

== Core principles ==
CFT is an evolutionarily informed psychotherapy largely built on the idea that the evolution of caring behavior has major regulatory and developmental functions. The central focus of CFT is to concentrate on helping clients relate to their difficulties in compassionate ways, as well as provide them with effective tools to work with challenging circumstances and emotions they encounter. CFT helps those learn tools to engage with their battles in accepting and encouraging ways, thereby aiding themselves to feel confident about accomplishing difficult tasks and dealing with challenging situations.

This is facilitated by:

- Developing a positive therapeutic relationship that facilitates the process of engaging with one's challenges and development of skills to deal with them.
- Developing non-blaming compassionate understandings into the nature of suffering.
- Developing the ability to experience and cultivate compassionate attributes.
- Developing the feeling of compassion for others, being open to compassion from others, and developing self-compassion.

According to evolutionary analysis, there are three types of functional emotion regulation systems: drive, safety and threat. CFT is based on the relationship and interactions between these systems. One is born with each system but our surroundings implicate whether one utilizes and sustains the non-survival-based systems (drive and caregiving).

- Threat and self-protection focused system: evolved to alert and direct attention to detect and respond to threats. This system contains threat-based emotions (anger, anxiety, disgust), and threat-based behaviors (fight/flight, freezing).
- Drive, seeking and acquisition focused system: pay attention and notice advantageous resources, experience drive and pleasure in securing them (positive system is activating).
- Contentment, soothing and affiliative system: enables state of peacefulness when individuals are no longer focused on threats or seeking out resources (allows body to rest and digest and have open attention).

Using CFT enriches the compassion-based soothing system, while withdrawing from the threat-focused emotional regulation system. In turn, this will augment the ability to activate (drive) and work towards valued goals.

== Applications ==
Compassion-focused therapy has been investigated as a novel treatment for a wide variety of psychological disorders. A 2012 randomized controlled trial showed CFT to be a safe and clinically effective treatment option for psychosis patients. CFT was shown to be more effective than "treatment as usual", with particular efficacy in reducing depression symptoms. A further 2015 literature review of 14 different studies showed promising psychotherapeutic benefits of CFT, especially when treating mood disorders. A recent meta analysis found good support for CFT as a treatment for a variety of psychological difficulties. However, further large-scale trials are necessary in order for CFT to become an accepted, "evidence-based" treatment for these disorders. For cancer patients, compassion-based interventions including CFT was shown to relieve depression and elevate self-compassion in this population.

CFT has also been explored as a treatment for individuals with eating disorders. This slightly modified version of CFT, CFT-E, has had promising results in treating adult outpatients with restrictive eating disorders as well as with binging and purging disorders. A 2014 literature review found CFT-E to be a particularly effective treatment for eating disorders due to the fact that it confronts the "high levels of shame and self‐criticism" that patients often experience. More recent primary studies have further proved CFT-E to be a safe and effective intervention for eating disorders.

CFT is also being studied as a rehabilitation method for patients with acquired brain injuries (ABI). Preliminary, small-scale studies have shown CFT to be safe and beneficial in treating anxiety and depressive symptoms of ABI patients, although further large-scale studies are needed.

As well as being a psychological therapy (for individuals and groups), Compassionate Mind Training (CMT) has been shown to be an effective approach for reducing psychological distress in the general public. A variety of studies have found that engaging in guided audios, online courses, an 8-week group and using an app (The Self-Compassion App) can lead to reductions in self-criticism, shame, attachment insecurity, depression and anxiety symptoms, as well as increasing self-compassion, positive emotions and wellbeing.

CMT has also been used as an effective approach in schools, with results suggesting a variety of benefits for teachers who engaged in an 8-week compassion training course.

== Limitations ==
Beaumont and Hollins Martin (2015) examined narrative reviews of 12 research findings that has shown use of CFT to treat and experiment with psychological outcomes in clinical populations. The researchers found that overall, there are improvements of mental health issues with CFT intervention, especially when combined with approaches such as cognitive behavioral therapy (CBT).

Beaumont and Hollins Martin (2015) found a major limitation in the empirical studies are the small number of participants involved in each case. For instance, Gilbert and Proctor (2006) showed small reductions in depression, anxiety, self-criticism and shame, however their participant group involved only 6 members. The small number of participants can cause bias or facilitate a problem of generalization for the broader population. For instance, out of the twelve studies only two individually supported effectiveness of CFT. A study conducted by Lucre and Corten (2012) found CFT to be effective for treating patients with personality disorders, and another study by Heriot-Maitland et al. (2014) found that treating clients in acute inpatient settings was effective.

Subsequently, a meta-analysis systematically examined all studies published up to 2024. By integrating data on 7,875 participants from 17 countries, the authors showed that CFT was effective in reducing overall negative mental health outcomes and improving compassion for self and others. The qualitative analysis of the studies also confirmed the need for larger-scale, higher-quality randomized controlled trials.

== Recommendations ==
The findings of Beaumont and Hollins Martin (2015) recommended that the effectiveness of CFT needs further extensive research in order to fully examine reductions in mental illnesses and overall improvements in quality of life. This study and a more recent met-analysis recommend for consideration of larger samples of participants in order to ensure that CFT can be independently effective without other psychotherapy interventions involved such as CBT.
