= Arnold Lodge =

- Nottinghamshire Healthcare NHS Foundation Trust
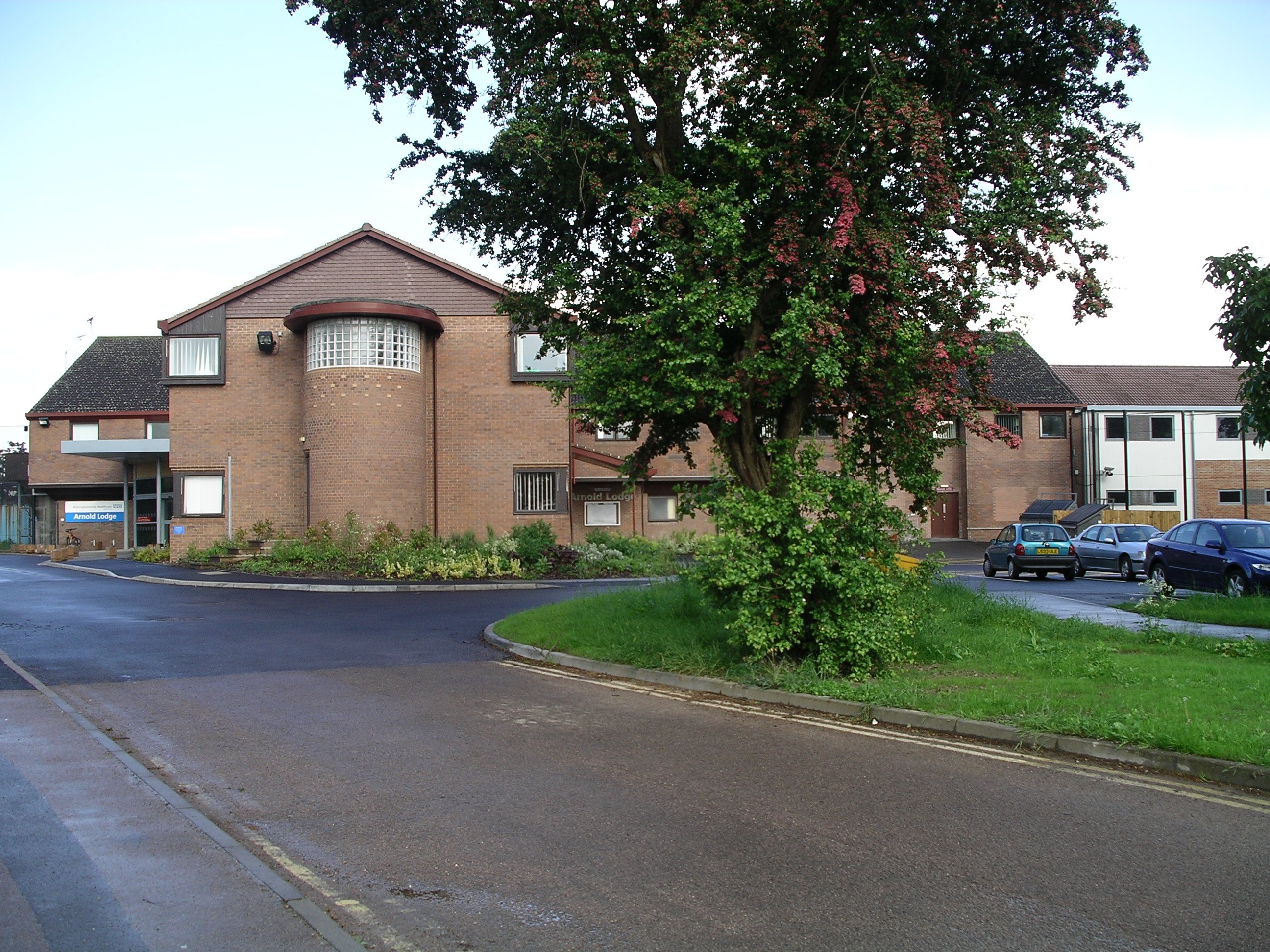

- Location in Leicestershire

Geography
- Location: Leicester, Leicestershire, England, United Kingdom
- Coordinates: 52.6486°N 1.094°W

Organisation
- Care system: Public NHS
- Type: Specialist

Services
- Emergency department: No Accident & Emergency
- Beds: 70 (approx.)
- Speciality: Psychiatric hospital (secure mental hospital)

History
- Founded: July 1983

Links
- Website: www.nottinghamshirehealthcare.nhs.uk
- Lists: Hospitals in the United Kingdom

Arnold Lodge is a medium secure psychiatric hospital situated in Leicester, England, run by Nottinghamshire Healthcare NHS Foundation Trust.

== History ==
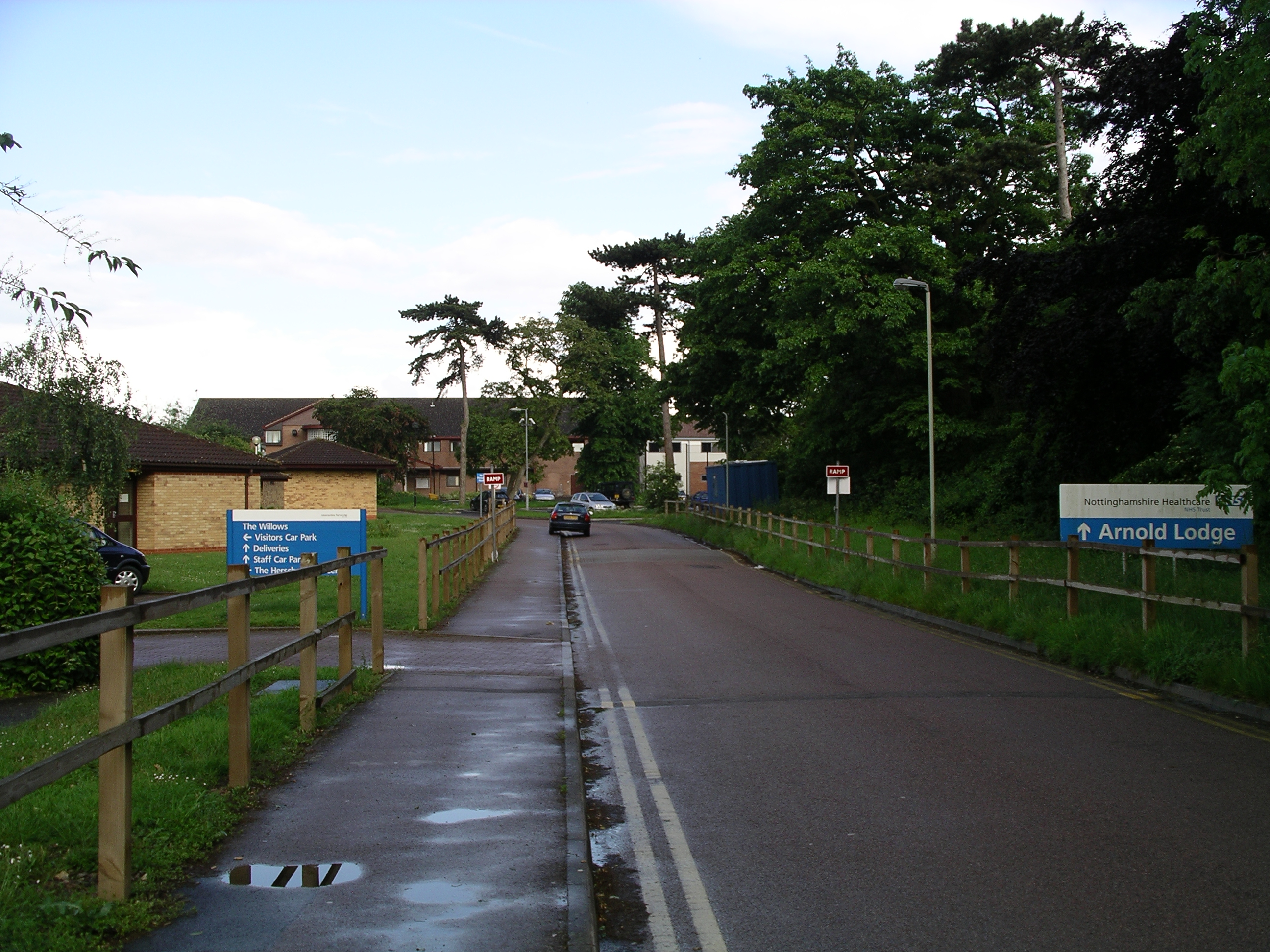
Arnold Lodge and approach road

The hospital was opened in July 1983 and an extension with 30 extra beds was opened in 2007.

== Services ==
Arnold Lodge receives referrals from courts, prisons, the probation service, social services, high secure hospitals, and other mental health units for forensic psychiatry assessment and/or treatment. The patients are mainly mentally disordered offenders or others with similar needs.

There are seven wards: two male rehabilitation wards (Thornton and Foxton wards), one male acute/admission ward (Rutland ward), two male personality disorder wards (Cannock and Ridgeway wards), and two female wards (Tamar and Coniston). Coniston ward is for women who require an enhanced level of care within medium security. This service will be one of three national pilots for a model of service known as WEMSS (Women's Enhanced Medium Secure Services).
