= Challenging behaviour =

Type of behaviour

Challenging behaviour, also known as behaviours which challenge, is defined as "culturally abnormal behaviour(s) of such intensity, frequency or duration that the physical safety of the person or others is placed in serious jeopardy, or behaviour which is likely to seriously limit or deny access to the use of ordinary community facilities". "Ordinarily we would expect the person to have shown the pattern of behaviour that presents such a challenge to services for a considerable period of time. Severely challenging behaviour is not a transient phenomenon."

Challenging behaviour is most often, though not exclusively exhibited by individuals with learning developmental disabilities, individuals with dementia or other mental health needs, such as strokes or acquired brain injuries, individuals with psychosis and by children, although such behaviours can be displayed by any person.

The term challenging behaviour is a euphemism.

== Types ==
Common types of challenging behaviour include self-injurious behaviour (such as hitting, headbutting, biting, scratching), aggressive behaviour (such as hitting others, headbutting, shouting, swearing, screaming, scratching others, spitting, biting, punching, hair pulling, kicking), inappropriate sexualised behaviour (such as public masturbation or groping), behaviour directed at property (such as throwing objects and stealing) and stereotyped behaviours (such as repetitive rocking or echolalia).

== Misuse ==
The term challenging behaviour has become subject to widespread misuse, most often as a euphemism for violent or aggressive behaviour. In educational settings it is often used to refer to acts of disobedience, defiance, or other non-compliance with authority. This is not what the term was originally intended to refer to. Increasingly professional groups are adopting alternative terms for example behaviour of concern.

As part of the euphemism treadmill, using the word challenged to describe a person, though originally intended to be a non-judgemental description, has become a derogatory term or a joke, similar to saying that a short person is "height challenged" or a bald man is "follicly challenged".

== Causes ==
Challenging behaviour may be caused by many kinds of factors, including:

- biological (pain, medication, the need for sensory stimulation)
- social (boredom, seeking social interaction, the need for an element of control, lack of knowledge of community norms, insensitivity of staff and services to the person's wishes and needs)
- environmental (physical aspects such as noise and lighting, or gaining access to preferred objects or activities)
- psychological (feeling excluded, lonely, devalued, labelled, disempowered, living up to people's negative expectations)

Challenging behaviour may also simply be a means of communication. A lot of the time, challenging behaviour is learned and brings rewards and it is very often possible to teach people new behaviours to achieve the same aims. Behaviour analysts have focused on a developmental model of challenging behaviour.

Experience and research suggests that what professionals call "challenging behaviour" is often a reaction to the challenging environments that services or others create around people with developmental disabilities, and a method of communicating dissatisfaction with the failure of services or others to listen for what kind of life makes most sense to the person, especially where services or others create lifestyles and relationships that are centred on what suits them or the service and its staff rather than what suits the person.

Challenging behaviour can often be viewed as a ‘behavioural equivalent’ of a mental health problem. However, research evidence indicates that challenging behaviours and mental health problems are relatively independent conditions.

A common principle in behaviour management is looking for the message an individual is communicating through their challenging behaviour: "All behaviour has meaning". This is a core in the functional analysis process.

Children communicate through their behaviour, especially those who have not acquired language and vocabulary skills to tell the adult what the problem is.

In adults with developmental disabilities certain types of challenging behaviour can predict contact with police and hospital admission.

== Behaviour response cycle ==
Challenging behaviours may be viewed as occurring in a cycle:

- Trigger
- Escalation
- Crisis
- Recovery

Analysis of this cycle provides a foundation for using a variety of strategies to minimise the triggers of challenging behaviour, teach more appropriate behaviours in response to these triggers, or provide consequences to the challenging behaviour that will encourage a more appropriate response. Behavioural strategies such as Applied Behaviour Analysis, operant conditioning and positive behaviour support use similar approaches to analysing and responding to challenging behaviours. Recently, Eidetic Model of Growth (EMG) has been used with promising results.

== See also ==
- Conduct disorder
- Operant conditioning
- Oppositional defiant disorder
- Positive behaviour support
- RAID (in mental health)
- Developmental disability
