= William Davies (cricketer, born 1972) =

English cricketer

William Oliver Davies (born 29 December 1972) was an English cricketer. He was a left-handed batsman and wicket-keeper who played for Shropshire. He was born in Shrewsbury and educated at Belvidere School, Shrewsbury.

Davies, who represented Shropshire in the Minor Counties Championship between 1998 and 2000, made a single List A appearance for the side, during the 1999 NatWest Trophy, against Hampshire Cricket Board. From the opening order, he scored 18 runs.

He has played cricket at club level for Wroxeter.
