= William Davies Company =

Defunct pork company

- Type: Private
- Industry: Pork processing and packing
- Founded: circa 1854
- Founder: William Davies (1831-1921)
- Defunct: 1927
- Fate: Merger with Gunns Limited and Harris Abattoir Co. in 1927
- Successor: Canada Packers (until 1991), Maple Leaf Foods (after 1991)
- Headquarters: Toronto, Ontario, Canada
- Number of locations: Food processing plants in Toronto, retail outlets across Ontario
- Key people: William Davies, Joseph Flavelle

William Davies Company was a pork processing and packing company in Toronto, Ontario, Canada. At one time, it was the largest pork packer in the British Empire, and it operated Canada's first major chain of food stores. One of Toronto's longstanding nicknames, "Hogtown", is attributable to the millions of pigs processed annually by the William Davies Company.

== Founding of the company ==
William Davies, born in 1831 in Wallingford, England, emigrated to Canada in 1854, and soon thereafter set up a stall in Toronto's St. Lawrence Market, where he sold cured hams and bacon. Realizing that there was an opportunity to export Canadian pork products to England, he wrote to his brother in 1860 stating: "I think you will say that the quality of the meat I send is as good as you ever saw."

Davies rented a facility at Front and Frederick Streets, a few blocks east of St. Lawrence Market, and was able to purchase and expand the plant in 1875. Soon, he was shipping millions of pounds annually of salt-cured pork. The William Davies building at 145 Front Street East, later occupied by the J. & J. Taylor Safeworks, still stands today.

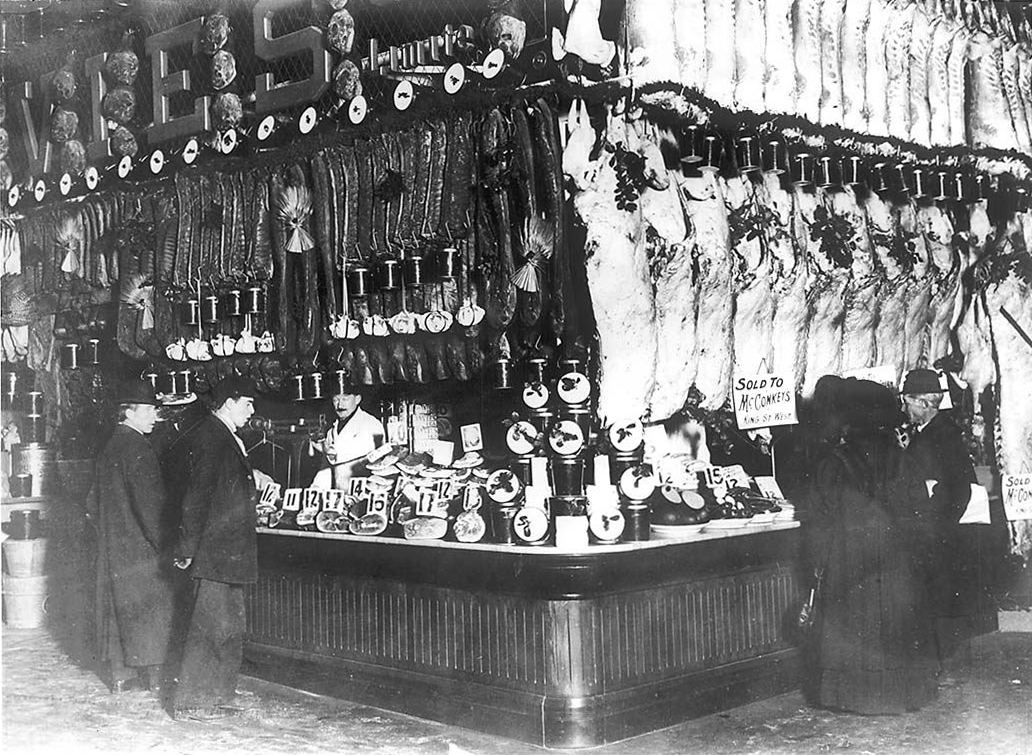
Davies' stall at St. Lawrence Market

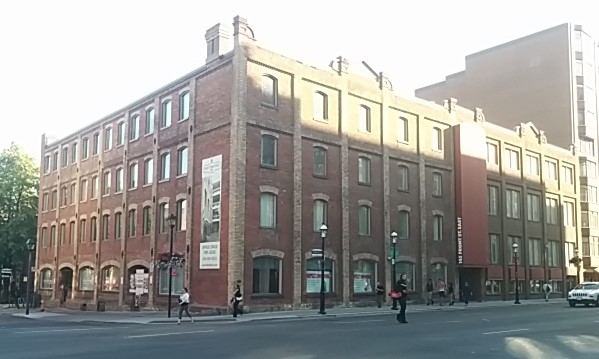
View of Davies Factory

== Business success ==
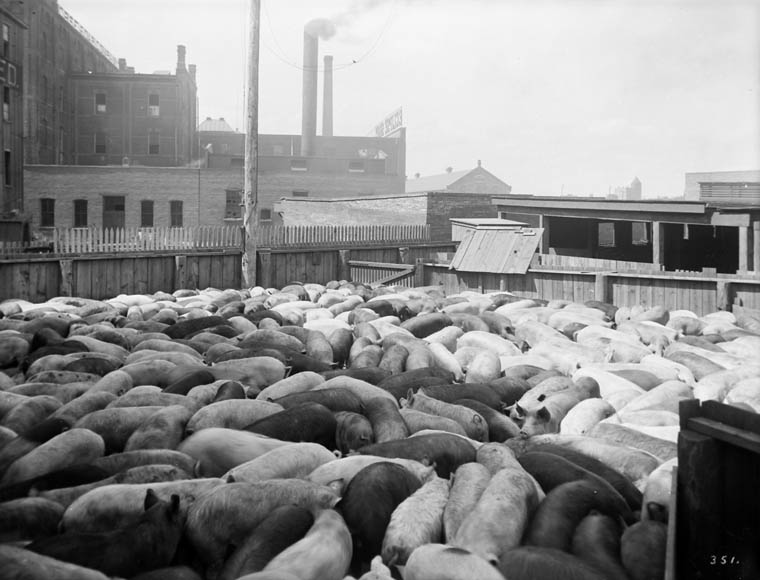
Hog pen at the William Davies Company pork processing facilities in Toronto, circa 1920s

In 1879, William Davies constructed a new facility further to the east, on the south side of Front Street at the Don River, which soon became the second largest pork processing plant on the continent. In addition to curing pork for export, he began slaughtering and processing hogs, and his business became the first continuous/moving rail hog-slaughtering facility in Canada. In 1891, the new plant was the first in Canada to feature an artificial refrigeration unit.

In many ways, Davies was responsible for establishing the modern Canadian pork industry. His efforts led to the establishment of the first Canadian Board of Agriculture, through which producers, processors and government officials could work together to expand the Canadian livestock industry.

As Davies had predicted in the 1850s, the firm's products did extremely well in the British market, and commanded higher prices than the offerings of American competitors due to the perception that they were of higher quality. By the 1890s, it was supplying over half of the entire Canadian bacon trade with Britain. The company's agent in Britain, John Wheeler Bennett, was known as the "Bismarck of the bacon trade".

In 1891, the business was reorganized as the William Davies Company Limited. By mid-1917, the majority of the shares were held by Sir Joseph Flavelle, a prominent Toronto businessman.

The company was the first Canadian food producer to establish its own chain of retail meat and grocery stores, the first major chain of food stores in Canada. By the 1880s, it operated 84 retail outlets across Ontario. The firm was quick to open stores in fast growing areas along streetcar lines; Flavelle was quoted as saying "where the trolley goes it fair to assume that we shall follow shortly."

The company was particularly successful during the First World War. As a result of articles in the Canadian press suggesting that meat-packing plants were making excessive profits from the domestic market in wartime, the entire pork industry was the focus of much public outcry, including charges of excess profits and fraudulent meat curing practices. The managers of William Davies were routinely accused of being war profiteers and monopolists. The federal government established a Royal Commission by Order in Council in July 1917 to investigate both the William Davies Company and Matthews-Blackwell Company Limited (the firms later referred to in the commission's report as "the principal dealers in Canadian hog products in the English market"). In November 1917, after a series of hearings, the commission cleared the two companies of any wrongdoing, noting that any exceptionally high profits during the war were subject to the federal government's war taxes.

== Establishment of Canada Packers ==
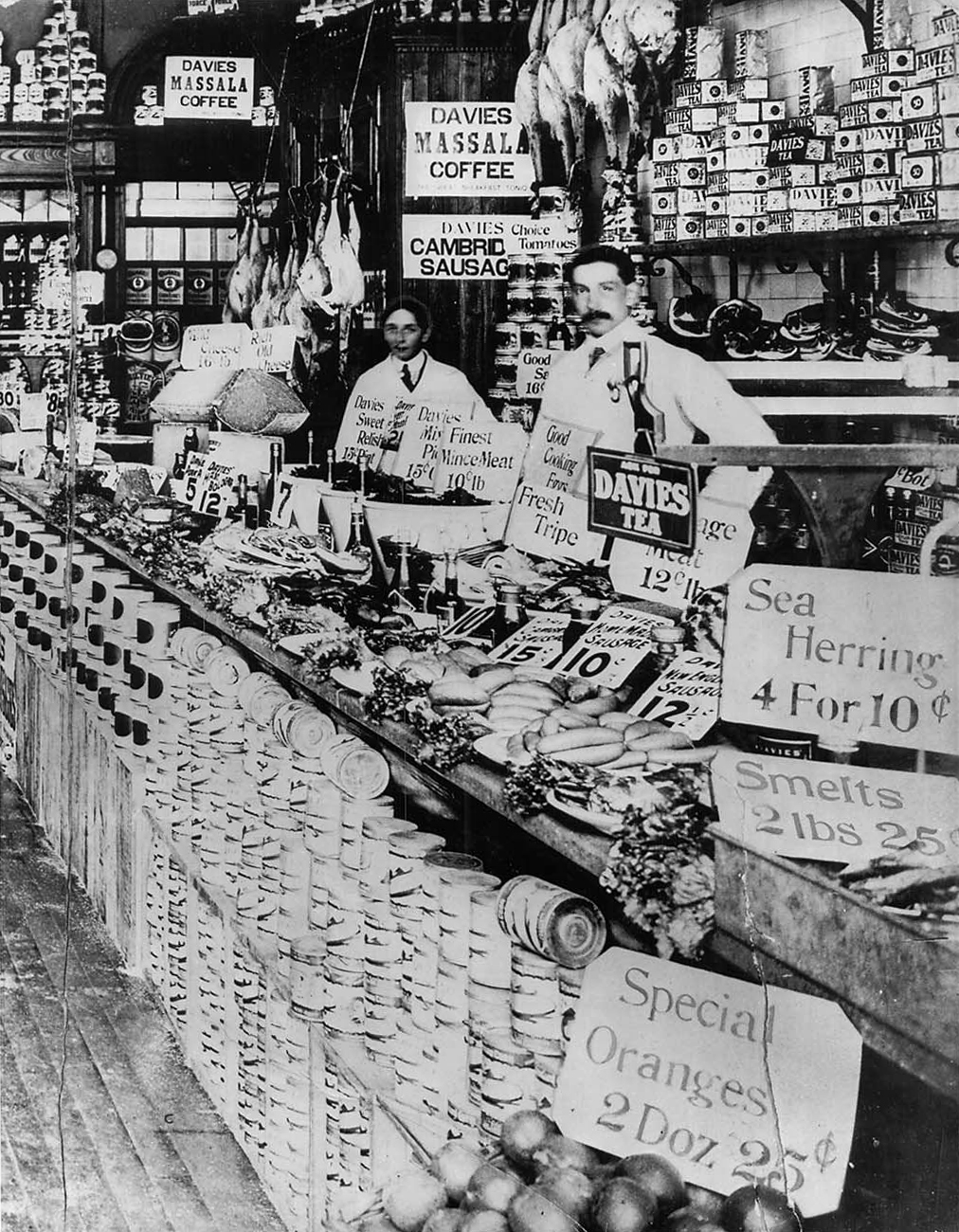
A William Davies Company retail outlet on Queen Street West in Toronto, circa. 1909

By 1920, the highly profitable wartime commodity markets had fallen, causing a rapid drop in prices. Food producers rushed to sell off inventory at reduced prices, causing prices to drop faster and further. The William Davies Company was "caught flat-footed" by the downturn, and was facing financial difficulties by the mid-1920s.

The downturn in the pork trade led to a merger between William Davies Company, Gunns Limited and Harris Abattoir Co. (in which William Davies Company held a 40% share) in 1927. William Davies Company was the foremost among the merging firms. The newly merged entity was named Canada Packers, and constituted Canada's largest meat processing and packing company. Not only did the merger improve the financial position of the constituent firms, it also blocked entry into the Canadian market by U.S. firms. Eventually, the Canada Packers operations were consolidated, with the meat packing and abattoir functions relocating to Toronto's union stockyards in the west end of the city. The former William Davies Company facilities by the Don River were first converted into a cold storage facility and soap works, and were eventually sold.

Canada Packers later merged in 1991 with Maple Leaf Mills, a producer of flour-based foods, forming Maple Leaf Foods.

== Legacy ==
William Davies died in 1921, after injuries sustained by being butted by a goat. Once one of Canada's largest food producers, the William Davies Company not only graced its home city with the "Hogtown" nickname (or epithet), but William Davies also introduced peameal bacon, which continues to be popular in Canada. Peameal bacon sandwiches are considered a "signature snack" at St. Lawrence Market, and were designated Toronto's signature dish in 2016.

Although the first William Davies plant still stands on Front Street in Toronto (albeit largely modified since its days as a pork curing facility), the last of the William Davies buildings by the Don River were demolished in the early 1990s in anticipation of the Ataratiri redevelopment project. Although Ataratiri never proceeded, the lands are currently being redeveloped as part of the West Don Lands precinct of Toronto's waterfront. In 2012, a plaque was installed in Corktown Common, located in the West Don Lands, commemorating the industrial legacy of the former Williams Davies Company on the site.
