= Belvidere School, Shrewsbury =

Belvidere School

Location
- Belvidere Lane; Shrewsbury, Shropshire, SY2 5RJ; England; 52°42′39″N 2°43′15″W

Information
- Type: Academy
- Local authority: Shropshire Council
- Trust: TrustEd Schools
- Department for Education URN: 146506 Tables
- Ofsted: Reports
- Head teacher: Robin Rashid
- Gender: Coeducational
- Age: 11 to 16
- Website: www.belvidere.shropshire.sch.uk

Belvidere School is a coeducational secondary school located in the Belvidere area of Shrewsbury, Shropshire, England. Belvidere draws 11- to 16-year-olds mainly from the surrounding areas of Monkmoor, Belvidere, Underdale, Abbey Foregate and Cherry Orchard. It is sited in grounds bordering open fields down to the River Severn.

The school became a Technology College in 2003, specialising in Technology, Science and Mathematics. In 2008 it received a second speciality as a Training School.

Previously a community school administered by Shropshire Council, in January 2019 Belvidere School converted to academy status. The school is now part of TrustEd Schools.

In September 2024 the school moved into a brand new £16 million school building, constructed on the school’s playing field.

== Notable former pupils ==
- Jonathan Anders (cricketer, born 1971)
- William Davies (cricketer, born 1972)
- Billy Jones (footballer, born 1987)
- Jonathan Bland (footballer, born 2005)
