= Libraries Connected =

British library organisation

Libraries Connected, previously the Society of Chief Librarians (SCL), is an organisation of all the public libraries in England, Wales and Northern Ireland.

It is a registered charity and receives funding from Arts Council England as its Sector Support Organization representing libraries.

Its stated vision is "an inclusive, modern, sustainable and high quality public library service at the heart of every community in the UK".

It supported the 2022 Big Jubilee Read campaign.
