= Ellsworth Flavelle =

Canadian baronet (1892–1977)

Sir Joseph Ellsworth Flavelle, 2nd Baronet (25 May 1892 – 19 December 1977), was the Chairman of the Canadian Palestine Committee and the World Committee on Palestine.

Heir to Joseph Wesley Flavelle and the Canada Packers fortune, Flavelle attended St. Andrew's College along with other children of Toronto's business elites

== Personal life ==
In 1914 he joined The Queen's Own Rifles of Canada, a Toronto militia regiment, as an officer reaching the rank of Captain when he enlisted with the 166th Battalion (Queen's Own Rifles of Canada), CEF on April 8, 1916. His father served as Chairman of the Imperial Munitions Board during the First World War for which he was created 1st Baronet Flavelle.

On January 22, 1917 Flavelle married Muriel I. McEachron (b. about 1895) daughter of W. N. McEachron and Isabel F Jackson McEachron. They had at least one son, Sir (Joseph) David Ellsworth Flavelle, 3rd Baronet (1921–1985). The baronetcy became extinct on David's death.

On the death of his father, Ellsworth became the second baronet and became "Sir Ellsworth Flavelle Bart."

An accomplished photographer, Ellsworth Flavelle's images illustrated Katherine Hale's This is Ontario and then his own Photography : a craft and creed. A fonds of over 12,000 of his photographs is in the Archives of Ontario.

Baronetage of the United Kingdom
Preceded by Joseph Flavelle	Baronet (of Toronto); 1939–1977	Succeeded by David Flavelle
