= Paul Gilbert (psychologist) =

British clinical psychologist

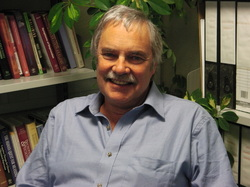
- Born: 20 June 1951 (age 75); The Gambia
- Education: University of Sussex; University of Edinburgh
- Known for: Compassion Focused Therapy
- Spouse: Jean Gilbert
- Children: 2
- Scientific career
- Workplaces: University of Derby
- Thesis: An investigation of cognitive factors in depression (1980)
- Website: www.compassionatemind.co.uk

Paul Raymond Gilbert OBE (born 20 July 1951) is a British clinical psychologist. Gilbert is the founder of compassion focused therapy (CFT), compassionate mind training (CMT) and the author of books such as The Compassionate Mind: A New Approach to Life's Challenges and Overcoming Depression.

Before retirement Gilbert was head of the Mental Health Research Unit, Derbyshire Healthcare NHS Foundation Trust. He remains Professor at the University of Derby. In 2011 Gilbert was appointed an Officer of the Order of the British Empire (OBE) for his continued contribution in mental healthcare.

== Early life and education ==
Gilbert was born in The Gambia and went to a British boarding school in 1962. In early life he considered being a rock guitarist but "unfortunately I was a very average sort of player and I recognized that this wasn't going to take me very far". He went to the University of Wolverhampton to study economics, graduating in 1973 before pursuing a career as a psychologist. In 1975, Gilbert gained an MA in Experimental Psychology from the University of Sussex followed by a Ph.D in Clinical Psychology from the University of Edinburgh in 1980.

== Clinical psychology ==
In 1993, Gilbert was made a fellow of the British Psychological Society for his contributions to psychological knowledge and was president of the British Association for Cognitive and Behavioural Psychotherapy in 2003. He served on the government's National Institute for Health Care Excellence (NICE) guidelines for depression. By 2011 Gilbert had published and edited 21 books, over 100 academic papers and 50 book chapters. In addition Professor Gilbert is currently editor for the "Compassionate Approaches to Life Difficulties" book series. Gilbert sits on the Emotion, Personality and Altruism Research Group at the Wright Institute (1992 – present) and is Visiting Professor at the University of Fribourg (Switzerland) and the University of Coimbra (Portugal).

== Selected publications ==
- Gilbert, P. (1984). Depression: From Psychology to Brain State. London: Lawrence Erlbaum Associates
- Gilbert, P. (1989). Human Nature and Suffering. Hove: Lawrence Erlbaum Associates.
- Gilbert, P. (1992). Depression: The Evolution of Powerlessness. Hove: Lawrence Erlbaum Associates Ltd. And New York: Guilford.
- Gilbert, P. (1993). Defence and safety: Their function in social behaviour and psychopathology. British Journal of Clinical Psychology. 32, 131-153.
- Gilbert, P. (1997). The evolution of social attractiveness and its role in shame, humiliation, guilt and therapy. British Journal of Medical Psychology, 70, 113-147.
- Gilbert, P. (1998). What is shame? Some core issues and controversies. In, P. Gilbert & B. Andrews, (eds) Shame: Interpersonal Behavior, Psychopathology and Culture. (pp 3–36). New York: Oxford University Press.
- Gilbert, P. (2000). Social mentalities: Internal ‘social’ conflicts and the role of inner warmth and compassion in cognitive therapy. In, P. Gilbert & Bailey K.G (eds.) Genes on the Couch: Explorations in Evolutionary Psychotherapy (p. 118-150). Hove: Brenner-Routledge.
- Gilbert, P. (2003). Evolution, social roles, and differences in shame and guilt. Social Research: An International Quarterly of the Social Sciences 70, 1205-1230
- Gilbert, P. (2005a) Compassion and cruelty: A biopsychosocial approach. In, P Gilbert (ed). Compassion: Conceptualisations, Research and Use in Psychotherapy (9-74). London: Routledge.
- Gilbert, P. (2005b). Social Mentalities: A biopsychosocial and evolutionary reflection on social relationships. In, M.W. Baldwin (ed). Interpersonal Cognition. (p. 299-335). New York: Guilford.
- Gilbert, P., Allan, S. & Goss, K. (1996). Parental representations, shame interpersonal problems and vulnerability to psychopathology. Clinical Psychology and Psychotherapy, 3, 23-34.
- Gilbert, P., Baldwin, M., Irons, C., Baccus, J. & Clark, M. (2006). Self-criticism and self-warmth: An imagery study exploring their relation to depression. Journal of Cognitive Psychotherapy: An International Quarterly. 20, 183-200.
- Gilbert, P., Clarke, M., Kempel, S. Miles, J.N.V. & Irons, C. (2004). Criticizing and reassuring oneself: An exploration of forms style and reasons in female students. British Journal of Clinical Psychology 43, 31-50.
- Gilbert P & Irons, C. (2004). A pilot exploration of the use of compassionate images in a group of self-critical people. Memory, 12, 507-516.
- Gilbert P & Irons C. (2005). Focused therapies and compassionate mind training for shame and self-attacking. In, P. Gilbert (ed). Compassion: Conceptualisations, Research and Use in Psychotherapy (263-325). London: Routledge.
- Gilbert, P & Leahy, R (in press). The Therapeutic Relationship in the Cognitive Behavioural Psychotherapies. London: Routledge.
- Gilbert, P. & Miles J.N.V. (2000). Sensitivity to put-down: Its relationship to perceptions of shame, social anxiety, depression, anger and self-other blame. Personality and Individual Differences, 29, 757-774.
- Allan, S. & Gilbert, P. (1995). A social comparison scale: Psychometric properties and relationship to psychopathology. Personality and Individual Differences, 19, 293-299.
- Allan, S & Gilbert, P. (1997). Submissive behaviour and psychopathology. British Journal of Clinical Psychology 36, 467-488.
- Allan, S., Gilbert, P. & Goss, K. (1994). An exploration of shame measures: II: Psychopathology. Personality and Individual Differences, 17, 719-722.
- Cheung, M.S.P., Gilbert P & Irons, C (2004). An exploration of shame, social rank and rumination in relation to depression. Personality and Individual Differences, 36, 1143-1153.
- Goss, K., Gilbert, P. & Allan, S. (1994). An exploration of shame measures: I: The ‘other as shamer’ scale. Personality and Individual Differences, 17, 713-717.
