= Flavelle baronets =

Extinct baronetcy in the Baronetage of the United Kingdom

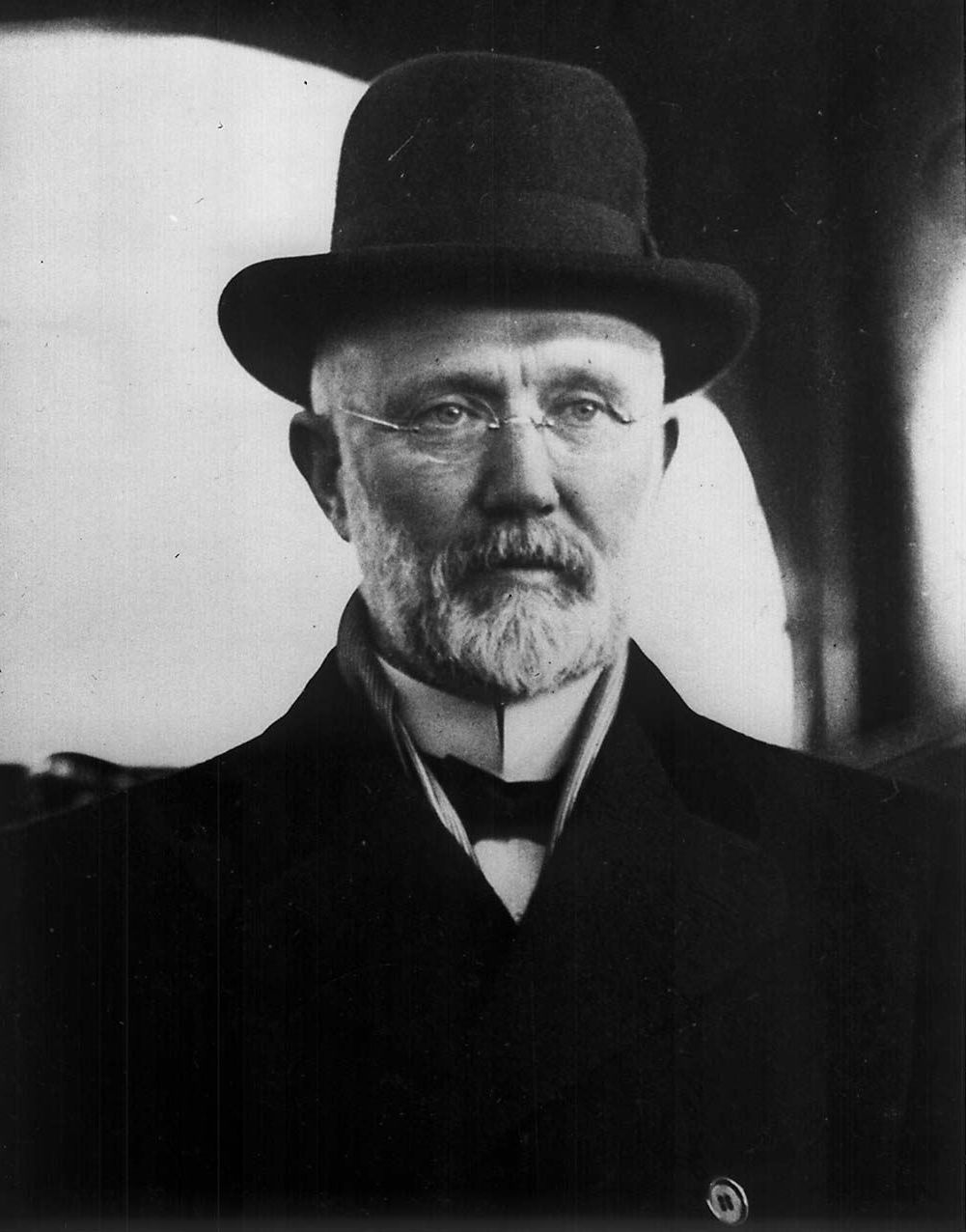
Sir Joseph Flavelle, 1st Baronet

The Flavelle Baronetcy, of Toronto, Ontario, Canada, was a title in the Baronetage of the United Kingdom. It was created on 18 July 1917 for the Canadian businessman and public servant Joseph Flavelle and was in honour of his work as Chairman of the Imperial Munitions Board during the First World War. The title became extinct on the death of the third Baronet in 1985.

== Flavelle baronets, of Toronto (1917) ==
- Sir Joseph Wesley Flavelle, 1st Baronet (1858–1939)
- Sir (Joseph) Ellsworth Flavelle, 2nd Baronet (1892–1977)
- Sir (Joseph) David Ellsworth Flavelle, 3rd Baronet (1921–1985)
