= St Andrew's Healthcare =

Private psychiatric hospital

St Andrew's Healthcare is a large independent charity based at St Andrew's Hospital in Northampton, which provides psychiatric services. It also has sites in Essex, Birmingham and Nottinghamshire. It runs specialist services for adolescents, men, women and older people with mental illness, learning disability, brain injury, autism and dementia and hosts the National Brain Injury Centre. It is a psychiatric hospital and service provider that caters for individuals requiring inpatient care and rehabilitation, and step-down housing.

In 2016 over 95% of its revenue, and patients came from the National Health Service through referrals from NHS commissioners. It has the capacity to cater for around 900 patients across its various sites, having grown rapidly since 2000. Its accounts show turnover of £183 million in 2016/17. The charity's surpluses are reinvested in patient care.

== Staffing ==
In 2016, it employed more than 4,500 people across the United Kingdom. In 2017, it partnered with the University of Northampton, Northamptonshire Healthcare NHS Foundation Trust, Northampton General Hospital and Kettering General Hospital, to encourage more mental health and learning disability nurses to move to the county and work in mental healthcare.

In 2012/13, Professor Philip Sugarman, the then Chief Executive, was paid £653,000, which was an increase of more than 18% on his previous year's pay of £552,000. In February 2014 Prof. Sugarman brought forward his planned retirement for health reasons. Gil Baldwin, became Chief Executive, in 2014. Baldwin's basic salary was £328,000 in 2016. Following Baldwin's resignation in January 2018, Peter Winslow was appointed Executive Chairman until a permanent successor was identified. Katie Fisher, who succeeded Baldwin as CEO in 2018, resigned from her role in October 2021. She was replaced with Jess Lievesley, the deputy CEO, on an interim basis.

Paul Burstow was appointed as chair of the organisation in September 2020.

== Performance ==
Reports on St Andrew's Healthcare, published by the Care Quality Commission, are publicly available.

The organisation has won multiple awards, including:

- Complex Care Provider of the Year 2017, Healthcare Investor Awards
- Mental Health Hospital of the Year 2016, Laing Buisson Awards
- Healthcare Caterer of the Year 2016, Catey Awards
- Mental Health Provider of the Year 2012, Third Sector
- Mental Health Provider of the Year 2011, Third Sector

The organisation's Nottinghamshire hospital for men detained under the Mental Health Act which houses patients with learning disabilities and autism was given an ‘overall inadequate’ rating by the Care Quality Commission in January 2019 and placed in special measures because of concerns about the use of seclusion policies. The hospital was taken out of special measures in August 2019, and has been praised for the support offered to patients.

In June 2019 the organisation's mental health hospital for children and adolescents in Northamptonshire was put in special measures by the Care Quality Commission because the patients were found to be treated in an “uncaring, undignified and disrespectful” way. People in seclusion were left to sit or lie on the floor in rooms with no chair, bed, pillow, mattress or blanket. In February 2020 after it had been rated “inadequate” for the second time the unit’s capacity was downsized from 99 to 30 and action was taken against some staff members.

In 2018 the organisation was featured in BBC Two documentary entitled Girls on the Edge. The programme followed three families whose adolescent daughters had been sectioned under the Mental Health Act to protect them from harming themselves. The film, made by Dragonfly Film and Television, won a Mind Media Award.

in 2019 the Care Quality Commission found evidence of poor and selective reporting, falsifying of records, intimidation of staff, and active deception of their inspectors soon after the organisation had lost an employment tribunal against a nurse who had been wrongly dismissed for whistleblowing. In 2020 the Charity Commission began an investigation into concerns raised by the Care Quality Commission.

In 2022 Northamptonshire Healthcare NHS Foundation Trust was co-ordinating efforts by five local community and mental health trusts to provide “targeted support” to improve the care quality provided by the charity.

After an inspection by the Care Quality Commission in July 2025, a restriction was placed on new admissions. 8 care workers were arrested on suspicion of wilful neglect and ill treatment. NHS England issued a letter to NHS managers in March 2026 telling them to move 287 inpatients from the Northampton site.

== Facilities ==
A multi-faith Chaplaincy and Spiritual Care team provides services for patients day and night.

Patients have the opportunity to take part in occupational and creative therapies, including arts, horticulture, ceramics, woodwork, textiles and catering. To help patients return to work when they are discharged, many gain work skills and experience at the charity's Workbridge Centre.

Education opportunities are available for patients - from AQA Functional Skills through to GCSEs, A-Levels and Higher Education. St Andrew's includes education for patients as part of care planning.

St Andrew's College is a specialist school for young people within the Child and Adolescent Mental Health Services (CAMHS) in Northampton. The College provides education sessions for around 100 students at a purpose-built independent college within FitzRoy House. The College was rated 'outstanding' by Ofsted in 2016 and 2017.

It plans to sell Mansfield Hospital, a 64-bed hospital site with three units for men with autism spectrum disorder and learning disabilities, to Nottinghamshire Healthcare NHS Foundation Trust in 2020.

== Research ==
Research is a key element of St Andrew's strategy, and is grouped by three top level themes:

1) Transition: Exploring mental health systems across the patient’s life span to enable individuals to live with the least restriction possible.

2) Personalisation: Designing and delivering health related activities (from spirituality through to genomics) that contribute to a positive change in health status for the individual.

3) Mental and physical: Enabling integrated mental and physical health care and treatment that prevents adverse health outcomes, including physical disability, lost life years and reduced quality of life.

A joint research project between St Andrew's and the University of Kent recently explored if virtual reality (VR) technology could vastly improve the lives of patients living with dementia. The results showed that virtual reality can increase well-being, help to recall past memories and reduce challenging behaviour, with ongoing psychological benefits.

== Podcast ==
In 2019, St Andrew's launched a unique podcast called On the Ward, recorded from inside the organisation's psychiatric hospital in Essex. The Guardian featured the podcast in a feature entitled "'People think of straitjackets': the podcast unveiling reality in a psychiatric hospital", and it has been shared by celebrities including Russell Brand.

== See also ==
- List of hospitals in England
