= Joseph Flavelle =

Sir Joseph Flavelle Bt
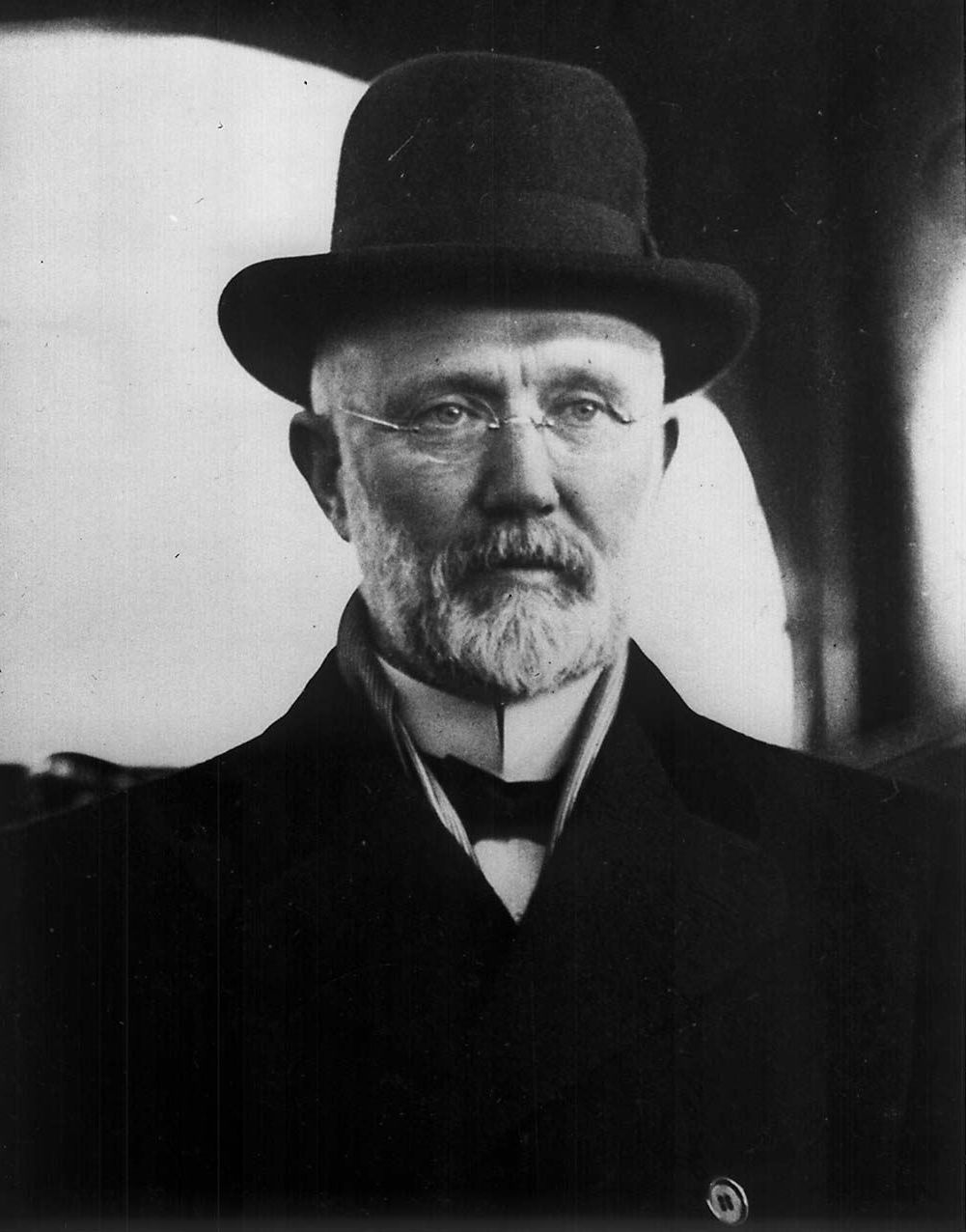
- Portrait of Flavelle, c. 1918
- Born: Joseph Wesley Flavelle; February 15, 1858; Peterborough, Canada West
- Died: March 7, 1939 (aged 81); Palm Beach, Florida, U.S.
- Resting place: Mount Pleasant Cemetery, Toronto
- Occupation: Businessman
- Spouse: Clara Ellsworth

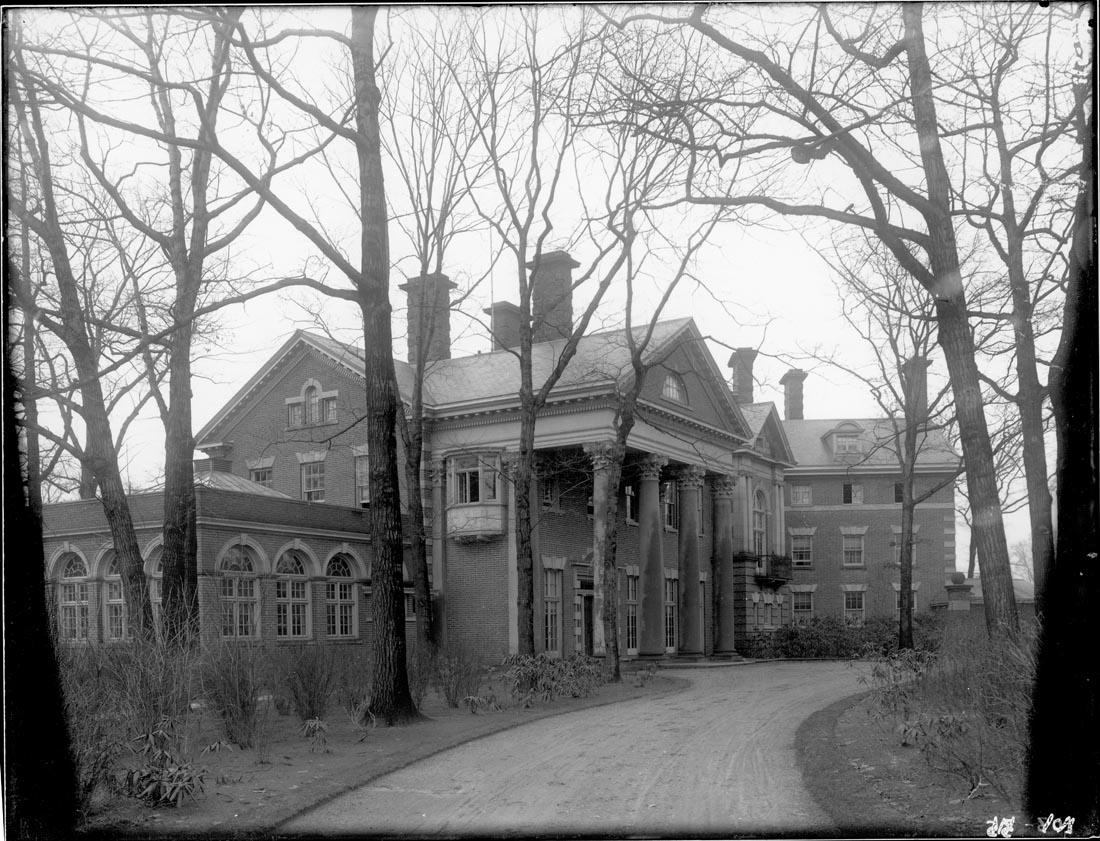
Holwood House in March 1907 (now known as Flavelle House)

Sir Joseph Wesley Flavelle, 1st Baronet (February 15, 1858 – March 7, 1939) was a Canadian businessman.

== Life and career ==
Joseph Wesley Flavelle was born on February 15, 1858, in Peterbough, Canada West, to John and Dorothea (Dundas) Flavelle. He married Clara Ellsworth in 1882. By the 1890s, Flavelle had made his fortune in the meatpacking business as president of William Davies Company, which was the British Empire's largest pork packing firm. He subsequently became prominent in finance and commerce as chairman of the Bank of Commerce, National Trust and Simpson's department stores.

Flavelle was chairman of the Imperial Munitions Board during World War I, and it was for reorganizing the industry that he was awarded a baronetcy in 1917. His was the last British hereditary title to be granted in the normal course to a Canadian citizen, due to the passage of the Nickle Resolution in 1919.

Flavelle died on March 7, 1939, in Palm Beach, Florida. He left his Queen's Park mansion (Holwood House at 78 Queen's Park Crescent) to the University of Toronto. It is now called Flavelle House and forms part of the university's Faculty of Law. He was succeeded in the Flavelle baronetcy by his son, Ellsworth.

== See also ==
- Flavelle commission

== Bibliography ==
- Michael Bliss (1992). A Canadian Millionaire: The Life and Business Times of Sir Joseph Flavelle, Bart., 1858-1939. University of Toronto Press.
- Brown, Robert Craig (2016). "Flavelle, Sir Joseph Wesley". In Cook, Ramsay; Bélanger, Réal (eds.). Dictionary of Canadian Biography. Vol. XVI (1931–1940) (online ed.). University of Toronto Press.
- Sir Joseph Wesley Flavelle at The Canadian Encyclopedia

Baronetage of the United Kingdom
| New creation | Baronet (of Toronto); 1917–1939 | Succeeded by Joseph Ellsworth Flavelle |
