= University of Southampton School of Medicine =

Medical school in Southampton, England

Coordinates: 50.933°N 1.435°W

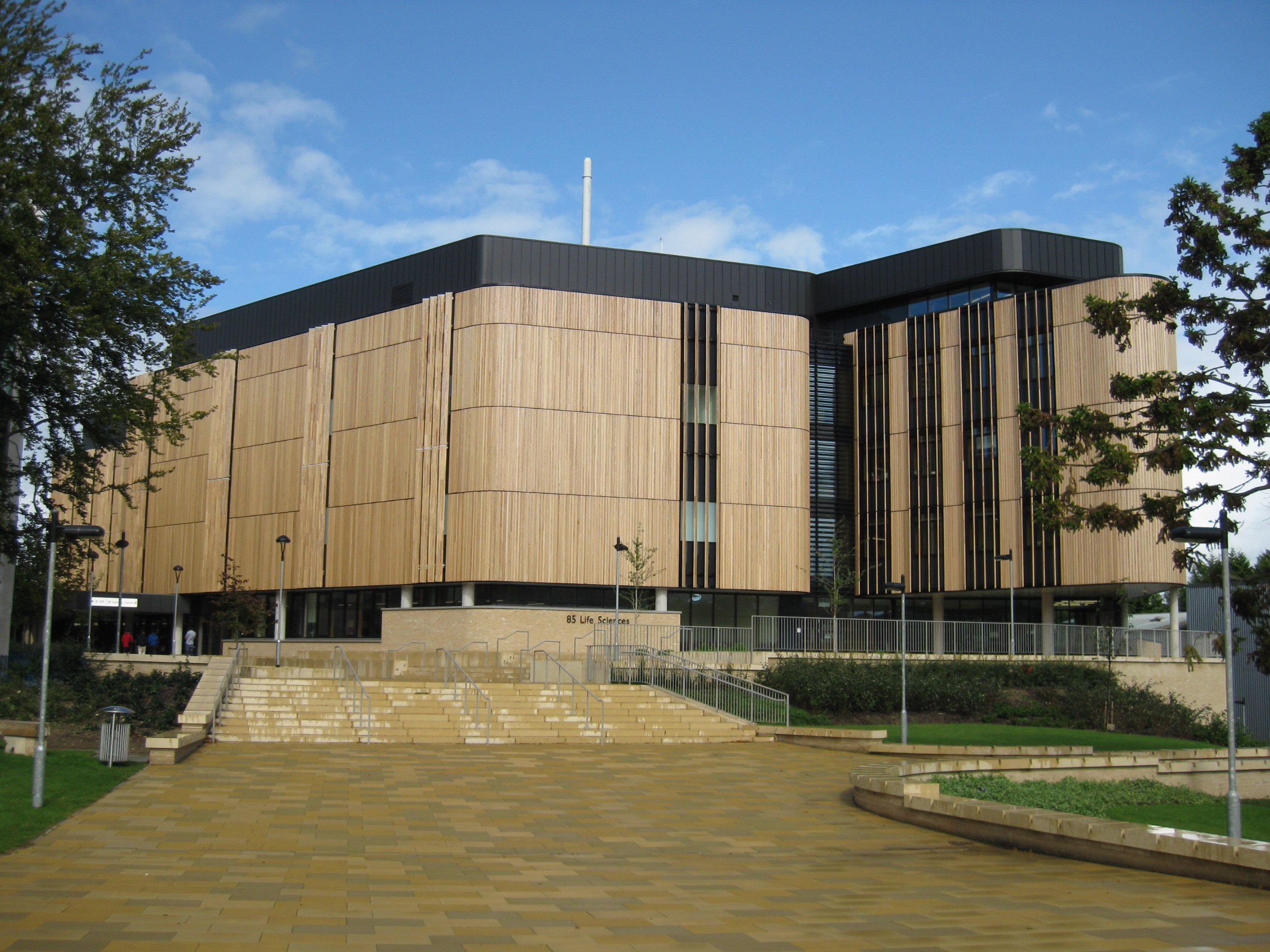
- Faculty of Medicine base: Life Sciences Building at Highfield
- Type: Medical school
- Established: 1971
- Parent institution: University of Southampton
- Dean: Professor Diana Eccles
- Academic staff: 370
- Administrative staff: 340
- Undergraduates: 1250
- Postgraduates: 220
- Location: Southampton, Hampshire, England
- Campus: Highfield Campus
- Website: www.southampton.ac.uk/medicine/

University of Southampton School of Medicine is a medical school in England. It is part of the University of Southampton with a site at Southampton General Hospital, offering 5 Medicine courses, all leading to the award of Bachelor of Medicine, Bachelor of Surgery (BMBS). Graduates of the BM5/BM6/BM(EU) programme are also awarded an integrated BMedSc (Hons) degree. Prior to 2013, the Bachelor of Medicine (BM) degree was awarded.

== History ==
The school was formed following the recommendations of the Royal Commission on Medical Education (1965-68); their report, popularly known as the Todd Report, was issued in 1968. The Commission estimated that by 1994, the United Kingdom would need to train more than 4500 doctors a year and was of the opinion that this would need to be achieved by both increasing the numbers of medical students at existing medical schools, and by establishing a number of new medical schools. The report recommended that new medical schools should be immediately established at the Universities of Nottingham, Leicester and Southampton. University of Southampton School of Medicine was opened in 1971, with 40 students enrolling. Southampton pioneered the integration of patient contact into the early years of the medical curriculum, something which was very unusual when the medical school opened.

As of 2014 entrance for the BM5 course, there is a minimum requirement of AAA at A level, including chemistry and biology plus either grade A at AS Level in a subject not studied at A2 or grade A in the Extended Project Qualification. General studies and critical thinking are not accepted. Subjects with material that overlaps (e.g. human biology/sports studies, maths/further maths) may not be offered in combination at A level. The UKCAT is also considered. The following shows the minimum score attained for those who were invited for interview:

- BM4: 3000
- BM5 School Leavers/Graduates/Overseas: 2800
- BM5 Mature Non-Graduates: 2500

== Course structure ==
The four undergraduate medical degree programmes on offer at the University of Southampton are:

- BM5: Standard five-year course in medicine for school leavers with A-levels or equivalent.
- BM6: Widening Access to Medicine course for students from disadvantaged socioeconomic backgrounds. This has an additional year at the start before running parallel to the 5 year course.
- BM4: Four-year course for graduates of other disciplines.
- BM(EU): Five-year bilingual course designed for German students run in partnership with a healthcare provider in Germany. Applications for this course are made directly to Kassel School of Medicine and not via UCAS.

Intakes for 2016 were (BM5) 202; (BM4) 40; (BM6) 30; (BM(EU)) 24. Applicants are required to sit the UKCAT admission test. The medical school interviews potential candidates as part of its selection process.

The BM5/BM(EU) & BM6 courses intercalate a Bachelor of Medical Sciences degree (BMedSc) as a core component of the five or six-year course, similar to the BMedSci intercalated degree at the University of Nottingham. The intercalated degree sees students undertaking a laboratory-based or clinical research project as an integral part of the course.

A standard optional year-long intercalated degree, awarded as a Masters in Medical Sciences degree, (MMedSc) is also on offer which allows students to integrate modules from across the university to complete an in-depth multidisciplinary research project.

== Facilities ==
The medical school is based at the Life Sciences building on Highfield Campus, University of Southampton and the South Academic Block at Southampton General Hospital.

== Hospitals ==
The school places students in the following hospitals for clinical placements:

- Basingstoke and North Hampshire Hospital
- Dorset County Hospital
- Farnham Road Hospital
- Fountain Way
- Frimley Park Hospital
- Gosport War Memorial Hospital
- Jersey General Hospital
- Lymington New Forest Hospital
- Poole Hospital
- Princess Anne Hospital
- Queen Alexandra Hospital
- Royal Berkshire Hospital
- Royal Bournemouth Hospital
- Royal Hampshire County Hospital
- Royal Surrey County Hospital
- Royal South Hants Hospital
- Salisbury District Hospital
- Southampton General Hospital
- St Ann's Hospital
- St James' Hospital
- St Mary's Hospital
- St Richard's Hospital
- Tatchbury Mount Hospital
- Western Community Hospital
- Wexham Park Hospital

== Research ==
The Complementary & Integrated Medicine Research Unit is a research group based at Southampton University School of Medicine, operating within the Department of Primary Medical Care. The unit was established by George Lewith in 1995 with core funding from the Maurice Laing Foundation. One in ten of the UK population use complementary medicine each year and approximately 50% are lifetime users. The unit has therefore focused some of its research on how people use CAM. and looks at methodology in Cam research.

== MedSoc ==
Owing to a large medical student body of over 1400 members, the University of Southampton Students' Union grants BM4, BM5, BM(EU) and BM6 students parallel membership to MedSoc, a semi-autonomous society within SUSU which organises events and activities tailored around the course and represents the student body to the medical school via a system of elected representatives. Over 40 individual societies ranging from academics and the arts, to sports, whose membership is available exclusively to medical students is also administered under the MedSoc umbrella.

=== Sport ===
Many sports teams are established under the MedSoc umbrella, including rugby, football, tennis, cricket, and netball. The Medical School is very well known for the success of its football team, The Roosters, which compete both intramurally and within the British Universities & Colleges Sport league (BUCS). Its rugby team (The Moose) won NAMS titles in 2013 and 2016. and the Badgers basketball team which won NAMs in 2016.

== Rankings ==
Under 2017 Complete University Guide Rankings, Southampton Medical School ranked 22nd in all United Kingdom Medical Schools The 2017 Guardian University league tables placed Southampton 9th out of all medical schools in the UK. It is ranked as the 12th best medical school in the UK for clinical medicine by U.S. News & World Report.

== Notable alumni ==
- Sir Donald Acheson, former Chief Medical Officer of the United Kingdom
- Michael Arthur, Provost and President of University College London; former Vice-Chancellor of the University of Leeds
- Martin Bricknell, former Surgeon General of the British Armed Forces
- Aditya Gupta, Canadian medical academic, dermatologist, and medical mycology researcher
- Terry Hamblin, haematology and immunology expert
- Gerald Kerkut, zoologist and physiologist
- Sir Eric Thomas, former Vice-Chancellor of the University of Bristol; chair of the Worldwide Universities Network
- Professor John Alcolado, Executive Dean, Chester Medical School (2020-) previously Head of Division of Medical Sciences and Graduate Entry Medicine and Deputy Head, University of Nottingham School of Medicine (2015-2020)
- Professor Sir Peng Tee Khaw, Consultant Ophthalmic Surgeon, Moorfields Eye Hospital, specialising in adult and paediatric glaucoma

== See also ==
- University of Southampton Students' Union
