= Lymington (disambiguation) =

Lymington is a town in Hampshire, England.

Lymington may also refer to:

== Places in or near Lymington, Hampshire ==
- Lymington (UK Parliament constituency), a former electoral district
- Lymington Branch Line, a railway
- Lymington and Keyhaven Marshes, nature reserve
- Lymington Lifeboat Station
- Lymington New Forest Hospital
  - Lymington Hospital, its predecessor
- Lymington Open Air Sea Water Baths, a lido built in 1833
- Lymington and Pennington, a current administrative area
- Lymington Pier railway station
- Lymington power station, a former electrical generating station
- Lymington River
- Lymington River Reedbeds, nature reserve
- Lymington River SSSI, a Site of Special Scientific Interest
- Lymington Town F.C.
- Lymington Town Hall, municipal building
- Lymington Town railway station
- RAF Lymington, a World War II airbase

== Other places ==
- Lymington, Tasmania, a locality in Australia

== People with the surname ==
- John Lymington, 20th century English author

== Ships ==
- MV Lymington (ferry), built 1938 to serve the Isle of Wight
- PS Lymington (1893) (ferry), used to connect Yarmouth and Lymington
