= Wendy Burn =

President of the Royal College of Psychiatrists

Wendy Burn CBE FRCPsych
- Born: 1958 (age 67–68); Oxford
- Education: Southampton Medical School
- Known for: Old age psychiatry
- Scientific career
- Workplaces: Royal College of Psychiatrists; University of Leeds; High Royds Hospital; Royal South Hants Hospital

Wendy Katherine Burn CBE FRCPsych (born 1958) is a Consultant in Old Age Psychiatry. She was President of the Royal College of Psychiatrists from 2017 to 2020.

== Early life and education ==
Burn was born in Oxford. She decided that she wanted to be a doctor at the age of two. Her parents were both doctors and her mother had been the first in her family to attend university. Whilst at school she joined the St John Ambulance brigade and spent her weekends administering first aid. Her grandfather was Joshua Harold Burn, a pharmacologist at the University of Oxford. She studied medicine at Southampton Medical School and joined the university theatre group. She became interested in punk rock, partied every night and failed her first year of medicine. She managed to turn her academic studies around, and passed the later years of her degree whilst acting as stage manager for the medical school revue at the Edinburgh Festival Fringe. In her second year she started a project on people who self-harm, and was surprised by the attitudes of staff to members of her patient groups. She eventually earned a medical degree and specialised in psychiatry. Her first placement was with Guy Edwards at the Southampton Medical School. She finished medical school in 1982 and completed house jobs in medicine and surgery. She worked at Lymington Hospital and Southampton General Hospital. Her medical house job was with Charles George, a clinical pharmacologist who taught her about the importance of understanding the mechanism by which drugs work. In 1983 she started a senior house officer post in the Royal South Hants Hospital and started to work in a Victorian asylum, Knowle Hospital. She unsuccessfully applied to the training programme in psychiatry at Southampton and eventually started a research position with Guy Edwards where she assessed patients on medical wards following self harm. In 1985 she earned her Membership of the Royal College of Psychiatrists and started her career as a psychiatrist in Leeds. Her first post was at High Royds Hospital, where she worked under the supervision of Richard Mindham and John Wattis.

== Career ==
Burn was one of the first women to be appointed a Consultant in Old Age psychiatry in Leeds in 1990. In her first consultant post she had to work with some of the most underserved communities in Leeds, the majority of her time spent on house visits. She was made Chair of the Senior House Officer programme in 1995. During this time she became more involved with the Royal College of Psychiatrists, becoming an examiner for the Part One examination. Her main research interest is in dementia and she sits on the national planning committees for dementia care. She was made Associate Medical Director for Doctors in Training in her NHS Trust in 2000. She eventually took over the clinical Part Two MRCPsych examinations, which involved finding psychiatric patients for candidates to interview. Soon after Burn became the Director of the Yorkshire Specialist Registrar Training Scheme in Old Age Psychiatry.

At the time she became clinical lead for dementia in Yorkshire and the Humber and working closely with Alzheimer's Society. Burn has been consistently involved with postgraduate medical training, and established the Yorkshire School of Psychiatry. She was the first Head of the School of Psychiatry in 2007. In 2009 she joined forces with the University of Sheffield and formed the Yorkshire and the Humber School of Psychiatry.

In 2011 Burn became Dean of the Royal College of Psychiatrists. At the time she became clinical lead for dementia in Yorkshire and the Humber and working closely with Alzheimer's Society. In her capacity as Dean of the Royal College of Psychiatrists she coordinated clinical examinations, professional development and lead national recruitment. She has stopped the MRCPsych examination from making a financial bonus and reduce the number of papers. She also oversaw the relocation of the Royal College of Psychiatrists from Belgrave Square to Aldgate. She handed the position over to Kate Lovett in 2016.

Since 2016 Burn has led the Gatsby Foundation and Wellcome Trust Neuroscience Project, which looks to transform training for psychiatry trainees. The project looks to increase the neuroscience components of psychiatric training to make it meet modern mental health treatment requirements. The initial phase included a review of the current curricula of neuroscience and psychiatry, which made recommendations for a new curriculum. After the curriculum was finalised, approved and adopted, Burn has been responsible for assessing its impact.

She served as President of the Royal College of Psychiatrists from 2017 to 2020. The focus of her presidency was helping old people with depression, dementia and anxiety. She also campaigned for more funding for the National Health Service and opportunities to increase mental health bed capacity. Burn identified that there are significant inequalities in mental health care across the United Kingdom, identifying that people in Wales had the worst access to specialist care. She serves as a member of the All-Party Parliamentary Health Group.

In 2018 she was awarded an honorary award from the University of Leeds. She has written for The Guardian about the need for improved mental health services.

Burn was appointed Commander of the Order of the British Empire (CBE) in the 2021 New Year Honours for services to mental health.

== Personal life ==
Burn married her husband William in 1991. In 1993 she was the first consultant in the Psychiatry Unit located at the Leeds Teaching Hospitals NHS Trust to take maternity leave for her son's birth. She had her second child, a daughter, in 1994.

Professional and academic associations
| Preceded by Sir Simon Wessely | President of the Royal College of Psychiatrists; 2017 to 2020 | Succeeded by Dr Adrian James |
