= Hayling Island Lifeboat Station =

RNLI lifeboat station in Hampshire, England

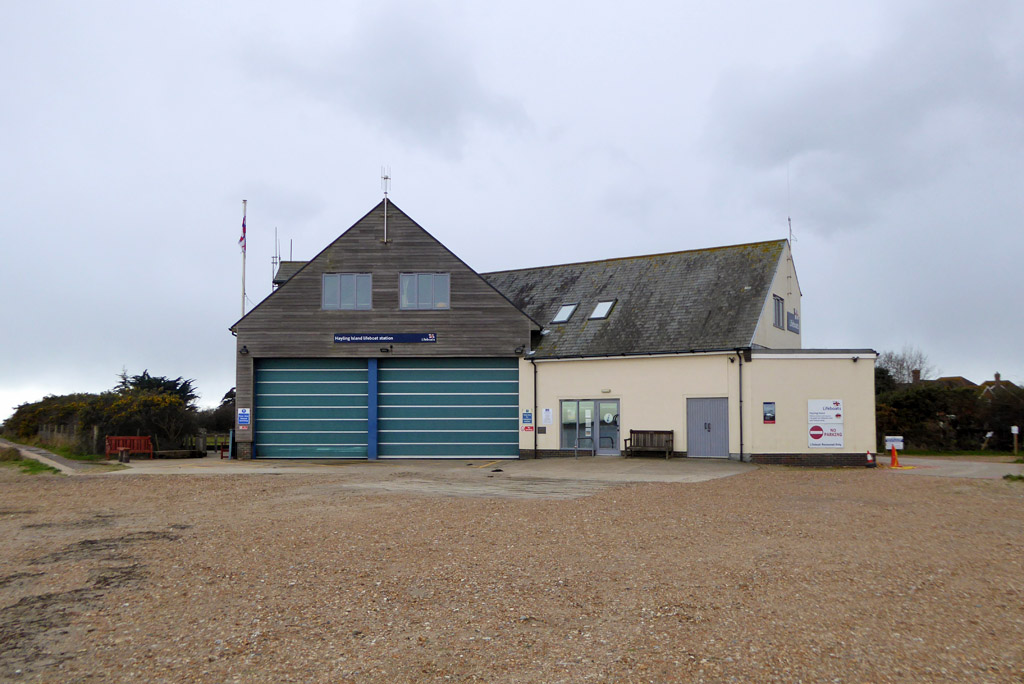
- Hayling Island Lifeboat Station.

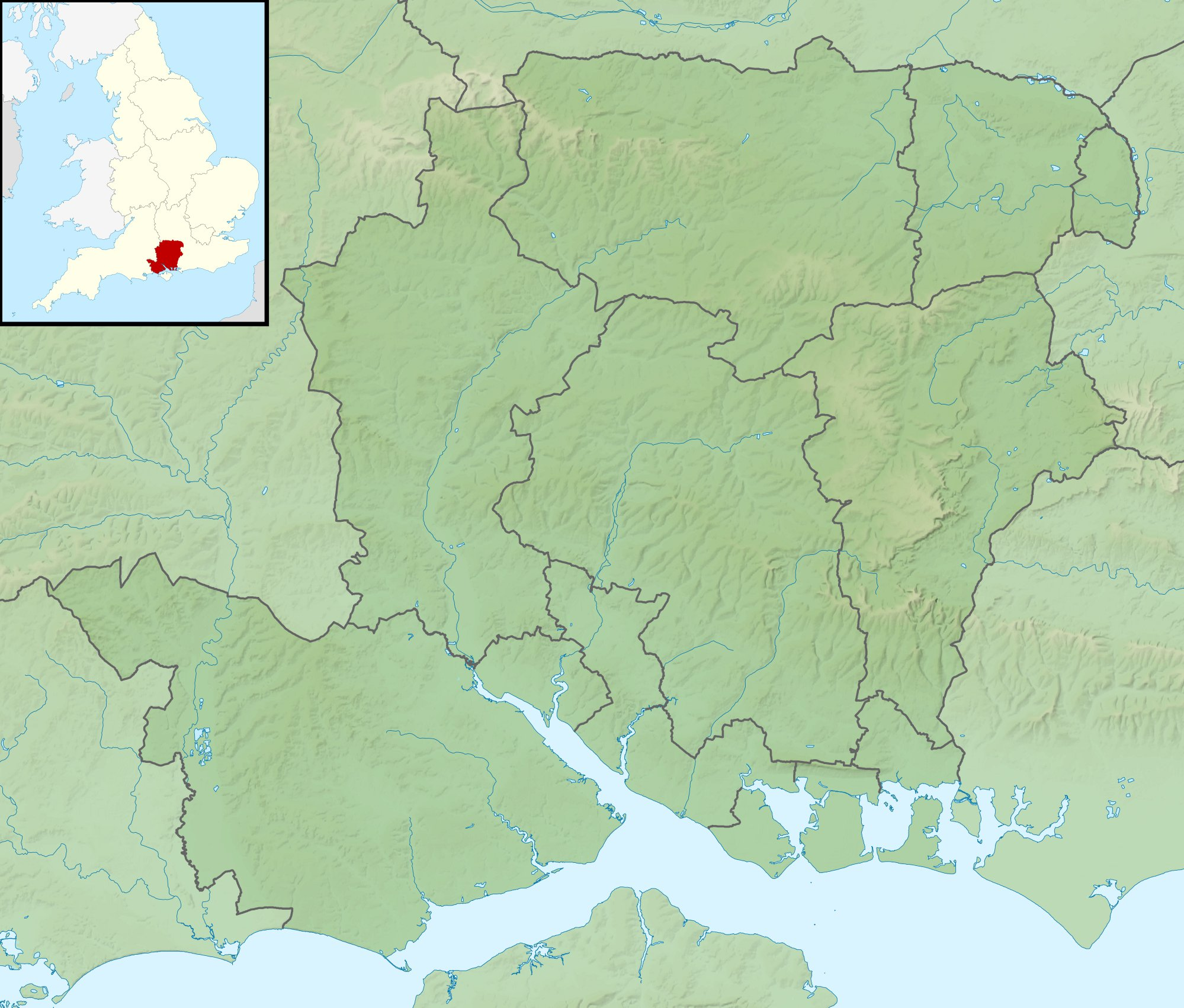
- Location within Hampshire

General information
- Type: RNLI Lifeboat Station
- Location: Hayling Island Lifeboat Station,, Bracklesham Road,, Hayling Island, Hampshire, PO11 9SJ, England
- Coordinates: 50°46′53.9″N 0°56′12.3″W
- Opened: 1865–1924; 1971–present
- Owner: Royal National Lifeboat Institution

Website
- Hayling Island RNLI Lifeboat Station

Hayling Island Lifeboat Station is located on the eastern side of Hayling Island, Hampshire, opposite the village of West Wittering, at the entrance to Chichester Harbour, where it joins the major shipping route of the Solent. This major shipping route is busy at all times of the year and there are estimated to be 10,000 boats in the Chichester area alone.

A lifeboat was first stationed at Hayling Island by the Royal National Lifeboat Institution (RNLI) in 1865, operating until 1924. A rescue service was re-established by the Hayling Island Sea Rescue and Research Organisation (HISRrO) in 1971, jointly run with the RNLI from 1975. In 1978, management was transferred solely to the RNLI.

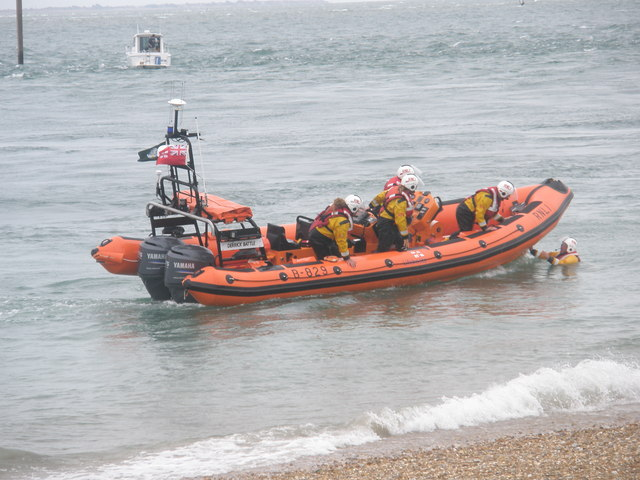
Hayling Island lifeboat Derrick Battle (B-829) during a lifeboat demonstration, 1 August 2009

The Hayling Island station currently operates a B-class (Atlantic 85) Inshore lifeboat, Clark (B-964), on station since 2025, and a smaller D-class (IB1) Inshore lifeboat, The John Dodd (D-913), on station since 2026.

== History ==
=== 1865–1924: original station ===
In a full gale on 17 October 1862, the sloop Cygnet of Portsmouth ran aground on Woolsiner Sandbank. 3 fishermen in their smack Ferret attempted a rescue, but couldn't get close. Dropping anchor, and launching their small 13 feet (4.0 m) rowing boat, they managed to rescue the three crewmen aboard the Cygnet. For their efforts, William Goldring, James Spraggs and David Farmer were each awarded the RNLI Silver Medal.

On 14 January 1865, Major Francis W. Festing of the Royal Marine Artillery, led a team of 10 fisherman men aboard a Fort Cumberland Cutter, and rescued 3 survivors from the schooner Ocean, on passage from Charlestown, Cornwall to Sunderland. Major Festing was also awarded the RNLI Silver Medal.

As a result of these rescues, Mr. Charles Hardy, vicar of Hayling, wrote to both the Hampshire Telegraph, where his letter was published, and to the RNLI, requesting a lifeboat station be established at Hayling Island, which was agreed. Mr William Leaf, of Leaf and Co. London, a wealthy Silk trader and philanthropist, donated £500 towards the setting up of the station. A 32-foot self-righting 'pulling and sailing' (P&S) lifeboat, one with oars and sails, was ordered from Forrestt of Limehouse, along with a new carriage, constructed by J. Robinson of Kentish Town and costing £86-8s-8d.

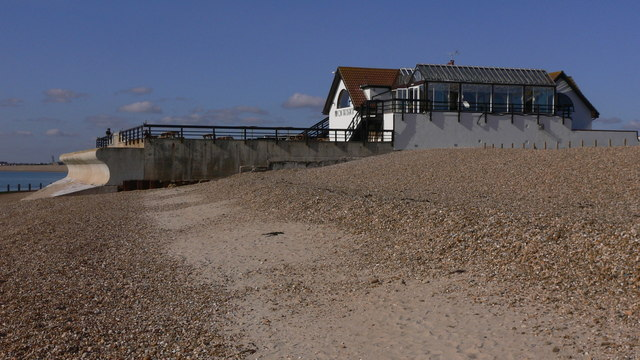
The 1865 boathouse is now unrecognisable, incorporated into a structure now used as a public house and restaurant.

A tender of £259-10s-0d from Mr. H. R. Trigg was accepted, for the construction of a boathouse at the western end of Hayling south-shore. The lifeboat was ready in September 1865, and after trials on the Regent's Canal, the boat was transported to Havant free of charge by the London and South Western Railway. The station was officially opened on 13 September 1865, with the boat being named Olive Leaf, and then blessed by Ashurst Gilbert, the Bishop of Chichester. William Golding, the same recipient of the RNLI silver medal in 1862, was appointed Coxswain.

On 1 February 1869, the Olive Leaf was launched to the aid of the barque Lady Westmorland, on passage from South Shields to Cartagena, Spain, when she was driven ashore at Hayling Island. The lifeboat arrived as the crew were about to abandon ship, but with the assistance of the lifeboat men, the vessel was refloated, and taken to harbour at St Helens, Isle of Wight, thus saving all 18 men and the boat.

In 1888, Hayling received the RNLB Charlie and Adrian (ON 146}, a 34-foot self-righting lifeboat, which remained on station until 1914. In her 26 years of service, she would be launched 20 times, and save 9 lives.

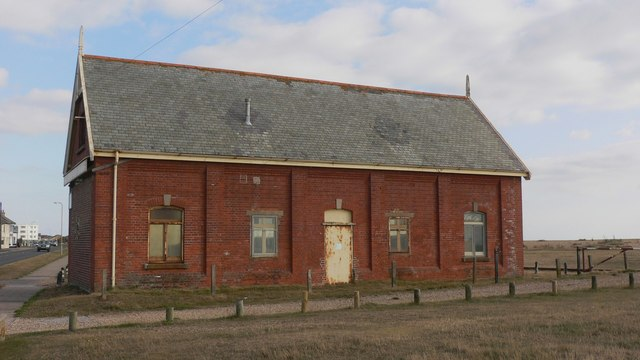
Hayling Island 1914 lifeboat house.

In 1914 a new lifeboat, the Rubie-class Proctor (ON 640), was allocated to Hayling Island. As she was larger than the previous two lifeboats, a new boathouse was required. The new boathouse was built two miles to the east of the original, at a cost of £900. Doors were built at boat ends, to enable a launch to the beach, or for the lifeboat to be transported by carriage to a more suitable location for launch if required. The 1865 boathouse is still standing, but now incorporated into a structure used as a public house and restaurant.

The All-weather lifeboat service at Hayling Island operated for a total of 59 years. The lifeboats were launched 34 times, and saved 56 lives. In 1922, more modern and faster motor lifeboats were placed at Selsey, to the south-east, and at Bembridge, to the south west on the Isle of Wight. The RNLI decided to close the Hayling Island Lifeboat Station on 15 May 1924. The 1914 boathouse still stands on the seafront and today is used by the Army cadets.

=== 1966–1980: private lifeboat station and re-opening ===
By the 1950s, increased use of pleasure craft along the Hayling coastline had led to a corresponding increase in marine incidents which required lifeboat services. In 1966, Mr. Frank Martin and his two sons started a "Rescue Patrol", using an inflatable boat. The fledgling service was run from a caravan located next to the coastguard station. A Land Rover was used to launch the lifeboat, which was powered with a single 40 hp Evinrude outboard motor. Their tiny organisation became part of the Shore Boat Rescue Scheme, an RNLI-recognised scheme.

Martin established the Hayling Island Sea Rescue and Research Organisation (HISRrO) in 1971, which launched for rescue services and undertook patrols along the area's coast and inland estuaries. It also researched rescue procedures and methods for divers.

In 1975, the HISRrO and the RNLI agreed to operate a joint service, and the partnership began operating from a new boathouse on the east side of Hayling Island, at Sandy Point, on a site leased from the Coldeast and Tatchbury Mount Hospital Group. The RNLI placed an B-class (Atlantic 21) Inshore Lifeboat (ILB) on station. The first call came even before the lifeboat was officially on service. On a training exercise, red flares were seen, fired from the Cabin cruiser Andrew John, having suffered engine failure. The boat was towed to Langstone Harbour.

The two organisations worked alongside each other until 1978, when they agreed to discontinue their joint association. Sole administration for the station and service was taken over by the RNLI. HISRrO continued to operate independently after the split until closing in August 1992.

=== 1980–present: hovercraft and new station ===
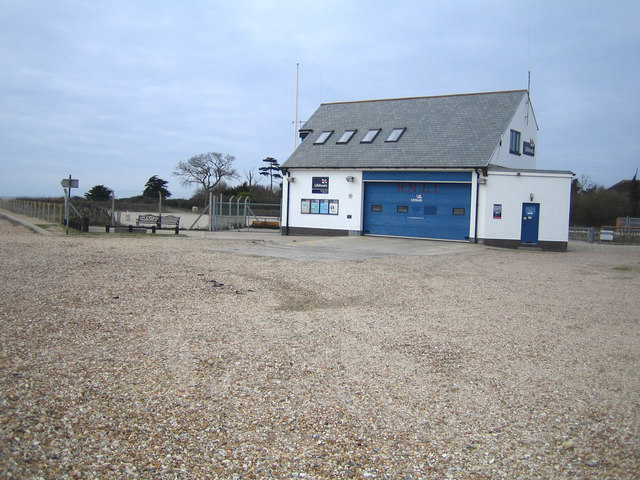
The Hayling island boathouse at Sandy Point, built in 1994/95 to house both the Atlantic 75 ILB and inflatable D-class lifeboat. It was redeveloped in 2007. It replaced the boathouse built in 1974 to house the first ILB's on station

In 1980, launch facilities at the boathouse were improved with the installation of a launch ramp. In November 1980 the station also received a new Atlantic 21 inshore lifeboat, the first to be designed and built for the Hayling Island station.

In June 2004 the RNLI sent a hovercraft, Hurley Spirit (H-005), for trials at Hayling island.

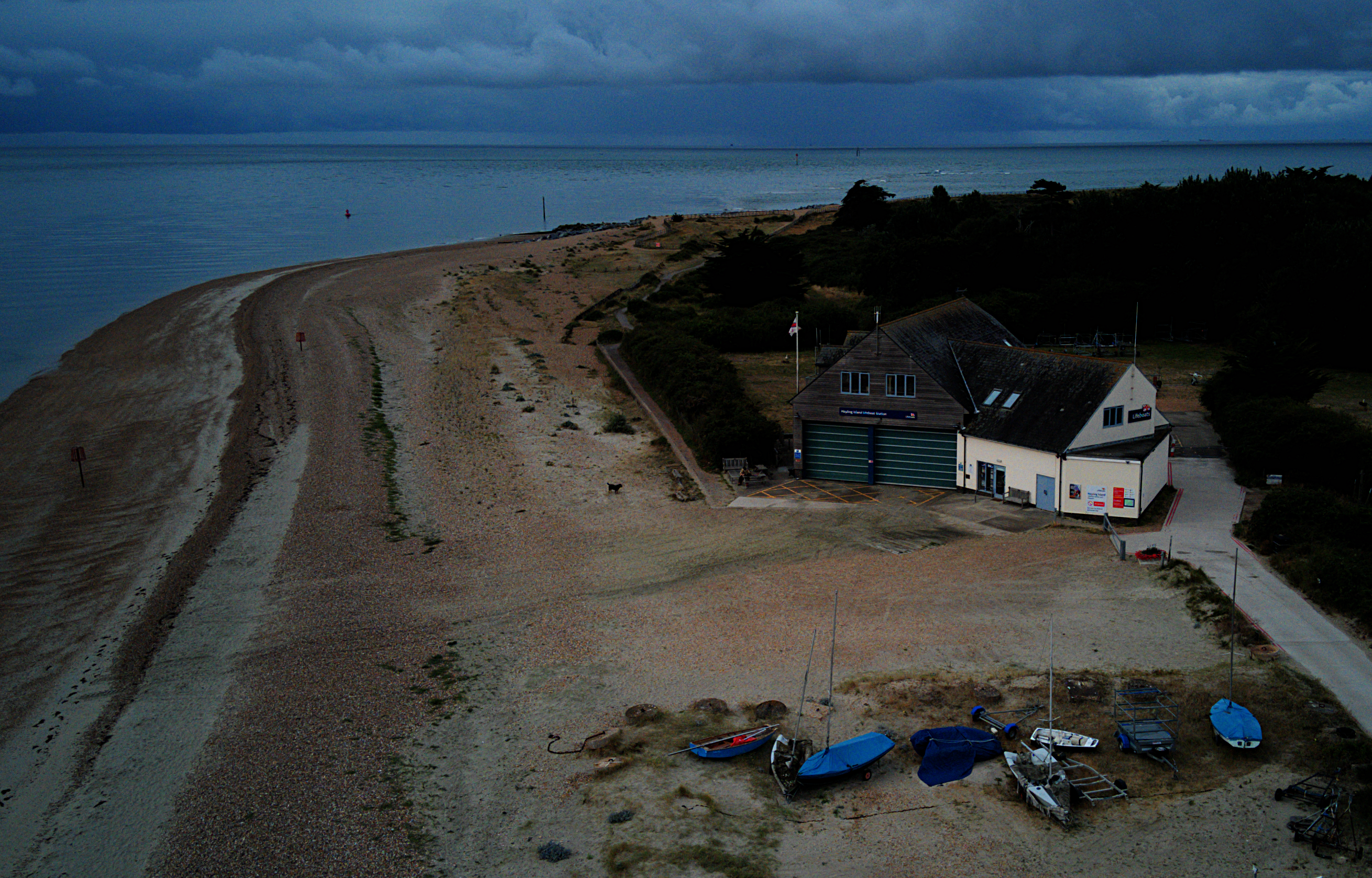
Hayling Island Lifeboat Station July 2023. The lifeboats are on trailers and launched across the shingle beach by tractor

Work began on an extensive refurbishment of the station in late 2006 to provide facilities for the B-class (Atlantic 75) lifeboat, with its Talus Atlantic 85 DO-DO launch carriage, and a Talus MB-764 amphibious tractor. They operated out of shipping containers temporarily placed on the station's car park during the rebuild. The new station, which incorporated the old structure, was completed in November 2007 and included a new boat hall with an upper storey. The new station was paid for from legacies of £500,000 from the Lusty family and £300,000 provided by Gwendoline Prince and the Hudson family.

The two current lifeboats are a B-class (Atlantic 85) lifeboat and a D-class (IB1) lifeboat. The Atlantic 85 inshore lifeboat, Derrick Battle (B-829), arrived on station on 26 February 2009. It is fitted with radar interlaced into the GPS system and VHF direction finding gear. The lifeboat is equipped with two 115-hp Yamaha outboard engines and has the capability of thirty-five knots. The second lifeboat is a smaller D-class inflatable lifeboat, Jacob (D-779). It arrived on station in 2015 and is an IB1 type boat powered by a 50-hp outboard engine giving her a top speed of twenty-five knots.

== Station honours ==
The following are awards made at Hayling Island

- RNLI Silver Medal

William Goldring, Master – 1862
James Spraggs, seaman – 1862
David Farmer, seaman – 1862
(all of the fishing smack Ferret)

Maj. Francis Worgan Festing, Royal Marine Artillery – 1865

Roderick Harold James, crew member – 1982

Roderick Harold James, Helm – 1993 (Second-Service clasp)
Frank Sidney Dunster, Helm – 1993

- RNLI Bronze Medal

Frank Sidney Dunster, Helm – 1981

Frank Sidney Dunster, Helm – 1982 (Second-Service clasp)

Graham Raines, crew member – 1989

- The Ralph Glister Award
  (for the most meritorious service of the (year) performed by a rescue boat crew)

Frank Dunster, Helm – 1981 (1980)
Trevor Pearce, crew member – 1981 (1980)
Graham Wickham, crew member – 1981 (1980)

Roderick James, crew member – 1982 (1981)
Frank Dunster, Helm – 1982 (1981)

Frank Dunster, Helm – 1989 (1988)
Graham Raines, crew member – 1989 (1988)
Roderick James, crew member – 1989 (1988)

Roderick James, Helm – 1993 (1992)
Warren Hayles, crew member – 1993 (1992)
Christ Reed, crew member – 1993 (1992)

- The Walter and Elizabeth Groombridge Award
  (for the outstanding inshore lifeboat rescue of the (year))

Frank Dunster, Helm – 1989 (1988)
Graham Raines, crew member – 1989 (1988)
Roderick James, crew member – 1989 (1988)

Roderick James, Helm – 1993 (1992)
Warren Hayles, crew member – 1993 (1992)
Christ Reed, crew member – 1993 (1992)

- 'People of the Year 1993', awarded by Royal Association for Disability and Rehabilitation (RADAR).

Roderick James, Helm – 1993
Frank Dunster, Helm – 1993

- The Thanks of the Institution inscribed on Vellum

Trevor Pearce – 1981
Graham Wickham – 1981

Graham Raines, crew member – 1982
Trevor Pearce, shore helper – 1982
Nigel Roper, shore helper – 1982

David B. Sigournay, crew member – 1987

Frank Dunster, Helm – 1989
Roderick James, crew member – 1989

Christopher Reed, crew member – 1993
Warren Hayles, crew member – 1993
Evan Lampard, crew member – 1993
Damien Taylor, crew member – 1993

- A Framed Letter of Thanks signed by the Chairman of the Institution

Patrick Lamperd, Helm – 1978
Dr Richard Newman, Honorary Medical Adviser – 1978
Frank Dunster, crew member – 1978
Brian Quinton, crew member – 1978

Roderick James, Helm – 1988
Frank Dunster, Helm – 1988

Richard Mumford, crew member – 1993

Graham Raines, Helm – 2001
Evan Lamperd, crew member – 2001

Peter Hanscombe, Helm – 2010

- Member, Order of the British Empire (MBE)

Graham Raines, Helm – 2004QBH

- Chichester Harbour Conservancy grant the Freedom of the Harbour

Hayling Island Lifeboat Station – 2006

== Hayling Island lifeboats ==
=== Pulling and Sailing (P&S) lifeboats ===
ON (Note: ON is the RNLI's Official Number of the boat.)	Name	Built	On station	Class	Comments
Pre-441	Olive Leaf	1865	1865−1888	32-foot Prowse Self-Righting (P&S)	(Note: 32-foot x 7-foot 6in (10-oared) Prowse-class self-righting (P&S) lifeboat, gift of Messrs. Leaf, Sons & Co of London, built by Forrestt of Limehouse, London, costing £259.)
146	Charlie and Adrian	1888	1888−1914	34-foot Self-Righting (P&S)	(Note: 34-foot x 7-foot 6in (10-oared) self-righting (P&S) lifeboat, gift of Mr L. T. Cave, FRGS, of Petersfield, built by Hansen & Sons of Cowes, costing £347.)
640	Proctor	1914	1914−1924	35-foot Self-Righting (P&S)	(Note: 35-foot x 8-foot 10in (10-oared) self-righting (P&S) lifeboat, gift of the late Mr W. J. Proctor of Newcastle-upon-Tyne, built by Thames Ironworks of Blackwall, London, completed by S. E. Saunders, costing £1,251.)

Station closed, 1924
Pre ON numbers are unofficial numbers used by the Lifeboat Enthusiast Society to reference early lifeboats not included on the official RNLI list.

=== Inshore lifeboats ===
==== B-class lifeboats ====
Op.No. (Note: Op.No. is the RNLI's Operational Number of the boat carried on the hull.)	Name	On Station	Class	Comments
B-511	Co-operative No. 1	1975–1980	B-class (Atlantic 21)	
B-548	Aldershot	1980−1994	B-class (Atlantic 21)	
B-541	Elizabeth Bestwick	1994−1995	B-class (Atlantic 21)	
B-526	Unnamed	1995	B-class (Atlantic 21)	
B-712	Betty Battle	1995−2009	B-class (Atlantic 75)	
B-829	Derrick Battle	2009−2026	B-class (Atlantic 85)	
B-964	Clark	2026−	B-class (Atlantic 85)	

==== D-class lifeboats ====
Op.No.	Name	On Station	Class	Comments
D-398	Victory Wheelers	1995–1996	D-class (EA16)	
D-496	Leonard Stedman	1996−2005	D-class (EA16)	
D-642	Amanda James and Ben	2005−2015	D-class (IB1)	
D-779	Jacob	2015−2026	D-class (IB1)	
D-913	The John Dodd	2026−	D-class (IB1)	

=== Launch and recovery tractors ===
Op. No.	Reg. No.	Type	On station	Comments
TW43	S540 UNT	Talus MB-764 County	1998–2008	
TW12	D508 RUJ	Talus MB-764 County	2008–2018	
TW15	E592 WNT	Talus MB-764 County	2018–	

== See also ==
- List of RNLI stations
- List of former RNLI stations
- Royal National Lifeboat Institution lifeboats
