= Basingstoke and North Hampshire Hospital =

- Hampshire Hospitals NHS Foundation Trust
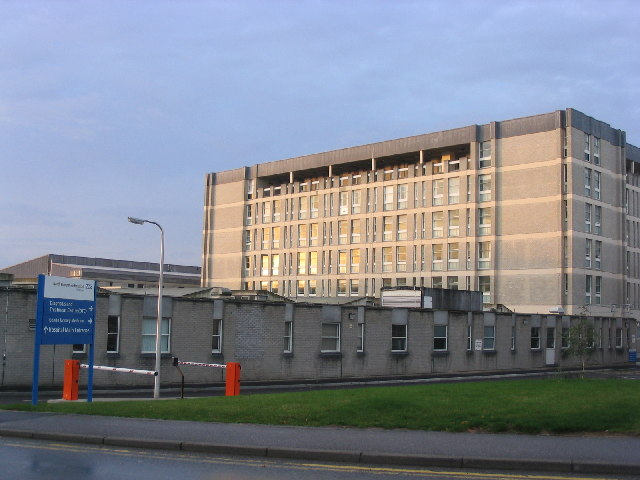

- Location in Hampshire

Geography
- Location: Basingstoke, Hampshire, England, United Kingdom
- Coordinates: 51.28°N 1.11°W

Organisation
- Care system: Public NHS
- Type: District
- Patron: None

Services
- Emergency department: Yes Accident & Emergency
- Beds: 806 (All Trust hospitals, Q3 2018)

History
- Founded: 1969

Links
- Website: www.hampshirehospitals.nhs.uk
- Lists: Hospitals in England

Basingstoke and North Hampshire Hospital (BNHH) is a 450-bed National Health Service (NHS) hospital in Basingstoke, Hampshire, England run by Hampshire Hospitals NHS Foundation Trust. It employs around 2,800 staff. Each year it has around 47,000 admissions, sees 43,000 patients in the Emergency Department, sees around 175,000 outpatients and delivers over 2,800 babies.

== History ==
The Basingstoke and North Hampshire Hospital (BNHH) opened as a maternity unit in 1969. The hospital established its own hospital radio station known as Hospital Radio Basingstoke and broadcasting on 945 kHz AM in 1972. The main hospital building was opened in 1974.

An elephant-shaped fountain by sculptor Sioban Coppinger, made to form part of a children's play area, was erected in Hunters Courtyard in the grounds of the hospital in 1992.

In 1999 BNHH became the first hospital in Europe to perform surgery using equipment operated by voice commands.

In 2002 a new education centre, The Ark Centre, was opened on the hospital campus, run by the North Hampshire Medical Education Trust, a registered charity.

The hospital was used as a set for both series of the Channel 4 comedy series Green Wing which broadcast between September 2004 and May 2006.

Early in 2012 the hospital, together with the Andover War Memorial Hospital and the Royal Hampshire County Hospital in Winchester, came under the management of The Hampshire Hospitals NHS Foundation Trust. In 2013, the Candover Clinic was established.

BNHH has had several outbreaks of Norovirus in the past, notably in December 2011, January 2013, April 2016, although these have mostly been small-scale and well-isolated by infection control procedures, reduced visiting hours and advice that vulnerable patients shouldn't attend the hospital during outbreaks.

== Candover Clinic ==
The Candover Clinic is a private hospital located on the BNHH's site. It is also funded and operated by Hampshire Hospitals NHS Foundation Trust. The clinic was built in 2013 and is dedicated to private patients. It provides an outpatients service, an inpatient ward, operating theatres and medical imaging to private patients.

The clinic has a 22-bed inpatient ward containing 22 individual en-suite rooms. It has a number of on-site diagnostic imaging machines, including MRI, CT, ultrasound and x-ray. There are also anaesthetic rooms and operating theatres as part of the unit for routine operations.

Despite being situated on the same site as Basingstoke and North Hampshire Hospital, the clinic provides services to private patients only. Patients pay for services either through private insurance or through self-funding. The profits generated from the clinic are reinvested into the Foundation Trust to provide a source of additional funding for the public services offered by HHFT. Over the period 2014–2016, the clinic had generated an income of £8.6 million.

== CQC ==
The independent regulator, the Care Quality Commission (CQC), rated the Basingstoke and North Hampshire Hospital as "Good" overall in January 2022.

== See also ==
- List of hospitals in England
