= David Baldwin (psychiatrist) =

British psychiatrist and academic researcher (ORCID 0000–0003-3343-0907)

David S. Baldwin (born 25 August 1960 in London) is a British psychiatrist and academic who is professor of psychiatry in the Faculty of Medicine at the University of Southampton, UK. His research focuses on neurobiological and psychological factors in mood and anxiety disorders.

== Early life and education ==
Baldwin completed his MB BS at the University of London in 1984. He subsequently earned his FRCPsych from the Royal College of Psychiatrists in 2002, followed by a DM from the University of Southampton in 2004. In 2015, he obtained an MA from Birkbeck College, University of London.

== Career ==
Baldwin has held several positions at the University of Southampton, beginning as a senior lecturer in psychiatry from 1994 to 2006, then advancing to reader in psychiatry from 2006 to 2010. Since 2010, he has been professor of psychiatry in the Faculty of Medicine. He is also an honorary professor of psychiatry at the University of Cape Town, South Africa, and an honorary consultant psychiatrist at the Mood and Anxiety Disorders Service, Southern Health NHS Foundation Trust, Southampton, UK.

In 2018, Baldwin had been working on Public Health England's review of dependency on prescription drugs. He wrote to The Times to say that for most people who cease to take antidepressants, "any unpleasant symptoms experienced on discontinuing antidepressants have resolved within two weeks of stopping treatment". He was criticised for this and harassed online. Other psychiatrists said that he had received funding from the pharmaceutical industry and his integrity could be compromised. He resigned from the review.

Baldwin has written about his own experience of depression.

== Research ==
Baldwin's research focuses on anxiety and depression, looking at both neurobiological and psychological factors. His work aims to improve outcomes in mood and anxiety disorders through:

- Investigating the role of neurobiological and psychological factors in causing and maintaining illness.
- Exploring notions of emotional well-being, particularly in health professionals.
- Improving trial design for evaluating the efficacy and tolerability of treatment interventions.
- Assessing the effectiveness and acceptability of treatment interventions in clinical practice, with a focus on OCD and autism.

Baldwin is involved in the European College of Neuropsychopharmacology (ECNP) as chair of the Educational Committee and Executive Committee member from 2022 to 2025. He has been the president of the British Association for Psychopharmacology, president of the Depression Alliance, medical patron of Anxiety UK, editor-in-chief of Human Psychopharmacology, editorial board member of Neuroscience Applied, and member of the ECNP Anxiety Network, as well as publishing some 500 scientific papers.

== Awards ==
Baldwin is a fellow of the Royal College of Psychiatrists, the Royal Society of Arts, Advance HE (formerly the Higher Education Academy), and the European College of Neuropsychopharmacology (ECNP).
