= Andover War Memorial Hospital =

- Hampshire Hospitals NHS Foundation Trust
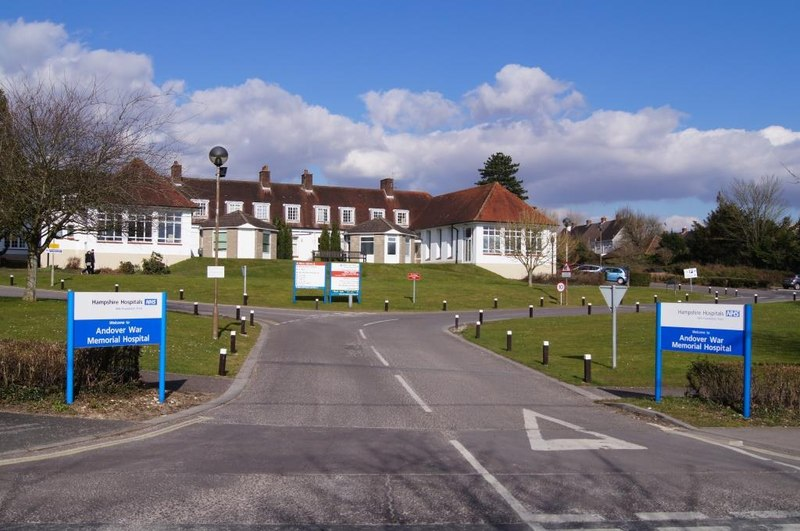
- Andover War Memorial Hospital

- Location within Hampshire

Geography
- Location: Andover, Hampshire, England
- Coordinates: 51.215731°N 1.494772°W

Organisation
- Care system: National Health Service
- Type: Community

Services
- Emergency department: Minor Injuries Unit only
- Beds: 806 (Trustwide, Quarter 3, 2018)

History
- Founded: 1926

Links
- Website: www.hampshirehospitals.nhs.uk/patients-visitors/contact-us/andover-war-memorial-hospital-awmh

Andover War Memorial Hospital is a community hospital in Andover, Hampshire. The hospital provides inpatient rehabilitation, day hospital services, a minor injury unit and an outpatient unit. It is operated by Hampshire Hospitals NHS Foundation Trust, but some services are provided by Southern Health NHS Foundation Trust. The Countess of Brecknock Hospice (named after Marjorie Minna Jenkins, first wife of John Pratt, 5th Marquess Camden), is located on the same site as the hospital. The independent regulator of health and social care in England, the Care Quality Commission, rated Andover as "requires improvement" overall in 2018.

== History ==
The hospital has its origins in a small cottage hospital erected in Junction Road in 1876. It was decided to build a new hospital in Charlton Road to commemorate the lives of service personnel who died in the First World War: the new facility was officially opened by Field Marshal Viscount Allenby in 1926. It joined the National Health Service in 1948.

In 2010, a new outpatient department was opened at the hospital. The old outpatients department, which was described as "unsightly" and "a danger to the public and a temptation to vandals" by the Trust's then-acting chief executive, Chris Gordon, was demolished in November 2011.

In August 2016, the road leading to the hospital was renamed to Henry Gamman Drive in honour to the man who donated the land on which the hospital was built.

== Services and wards ==
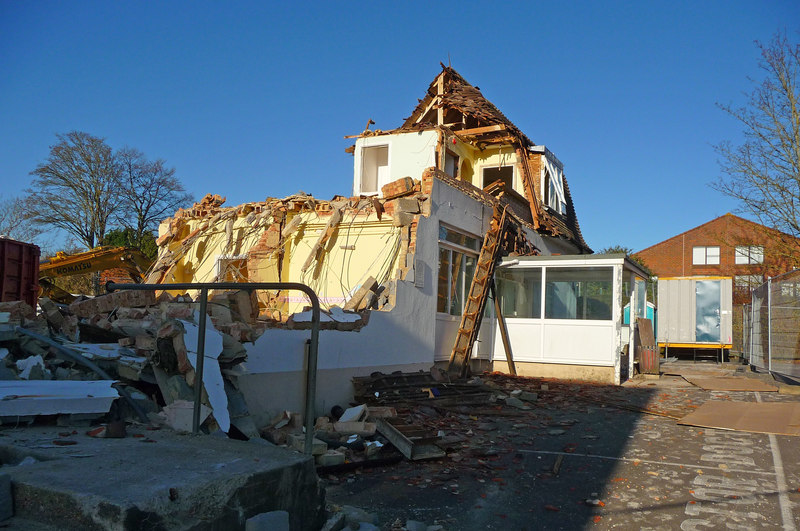
The old outpatients department following demolition

=== Physiotherapy ===
Physiotherapy services are offered both to outpatients and inpatients at the hospital. The outpatients service advise on muscular exercises and provide a range of treatments, including soft tissue massage, acupuncture and electrotherapy.

=== Kingfisher Rehabilitation Unit ===
Kingfisher Ward is a 22-bed ward which specialises in the rehabilitation of elderly people. The ward provides rehabilitation for a variety of patients, including following orthopaedic procedures, post general surgery, for those with cardiac problems or patients recovering from serious infection.

=== Maternity Centre ===
The Maternity Centre, formerly known as the Andover Birth Centre, offers ante-natal and post-natal care. The centre also offers the "DOMINO" scheme, whereby low-risk women are given the option to give birth outside of a hospital environment, under the care of the community midwifery team.

=== Minor Injuries Unit ===
The Minor Injuries Unit is a nurse-led service that provides treatment for minor injuries, aiming to keep patients from using other accident and emergency departments. The unit deals with a number of conditions, including musculoskeletal injuries, wounds, burns and scalds, minor head injuries, minor eye injuries, insect bites and emergency contraception. It also has an X-ray scanner.

=== Services offered by Southern Health NHSFT ===
Southern Health NHS Foundation Trust provide the following services at the hospital:

- Physiotherapy
- Spinal clinic
- Rehabilitation services
- Podiatry
- Health Visitors
- School Nurses

The hospital is also the base for SHFT's Community Care Team.
