= Ryhurst =

English health estate management company

Ryhurst Ltd is a specialist provider of health estate management services in England. The firm is based in Sussex.

Ryhurst formerly delivered new NHS facilities via the Private Finance Initiative. It built Lymington New Forest Hospital, which opened in 2007 for Southern Health NHS Foundation Trust but has now developed a strategic estates partnership model. The public sector contributes the land and the assets, and the private sector secures funding to an equivalent amount. Both have a 50-50 share in the resulting company. Stephen Collinson, the managing director of Ryhurst, is a former hospital chief executive.

Partnerships have been formed with Cheshire and Wirral Partnership NHS Foundation Trust, Lancashire Care NHS Foundation Trust, and the Isle of Wight NHS Trust. Collinson claims that the company acts as a 50:50 partner with the trust and tries to help them deliver their clinical service plans and service change strategies by providing the most appropriate estate.

Concerned residents on the Isle of Wight held a meeting about the future of the Isle of Wight NHS Trust and the partnership with Ryhurst, in December 2014. The deal was described by trade unions as a slippery slope towards privatisation. Isle of Wight Council scrutiny committee chairman Cllr Geoff Lumley questioned why health trust bosses failed to mention the deal when they met with councillors in November 2014.
