= Daniel Rosenthal =

Daniel Rosenthal may refer to:

- Daniel Rosenthal (politician), member of the New York State Assembly
- Dan K. Rosenthal (born 1966), Assistant to the President
- Daniel Rosenthal (criminal), American-French convict known for the murder of his mother
- Constantin Daniel Rosenthal, Romanian painter and sculptor
