= Hampshire Hospitals NHS Foundation Trust =

NHS hospital trust

- Type: NHS foundation trust
- Established: 9 January 2012
- Headquarters: Aldermaston Road; Basingstoke; RG24 9NA
- Region served: Hampshire and West Berkshire
- Budget: £424.1 million (2018/2019)
- Hospitals: Andover War Memorial Hospital; Basingstoke and North Hampshire Hospital; Royal Hampshire County Hospital
- Staff: 5,916 (2019/20)
- Website: www.hampshirehospitals.nhs.uk

Hampshire Hospitals NHS Foundation Trust is an NHS foundation trust providing services in Hampshire and parts of west Berkshire. It was established in January 2012 as the result of the integration of Basingstoke and North Hampshire NHS Foundation Trust and Winchester and Eastleigh Healthcare Trust. It runs Andover War Memorial Hospital, Basingstoke and North Hampshire Hospital and Royal Hampshire County Hospital. (RHCH) The Trust also runs a private hospital on the same site as BNHH - the Candover Clinic.

== History ==
The trust was established on 9 January 2012 following the merger of the Basingstoke and North Hampshire NHS Foundation Trust and the Winchester and Eastleigh Healthcare NHS Trust.

== Structure ==
HHFT employs approximately 7,000 staff. As an NHS foundation trust, HHFT is accountable to the public through a Council of Governors elected by members of the Trust. Anyone can become a member of a Foundation Trust for free.

In 2013 the trust established a subsidiary company, Hampshire Hospitals Contract Services Limited, to which 5 estates and facilities staff were transferred. The intention was to achieve VAT benefits, as well as pay bill savings, by recruiting new staff on less expensive non-NHS contracts. VAT benefits arise because NHS trusts can only claim VAT back on a small subset of goods and services they buy. The Value Added Tax Act 1994 provides a mechanism through which NHS trusts can qualify for refunds on contracted out services.

The trust's current chief medical officer as of July 2025 is Dr. Ruth Williamson (Consultant Radiologist). The chief nurse as of September 2018 is Julie Dawes (previously chief nurse and chief executive of Southern Health NHS Foundation Trust). The chief financial officer is Steve West, and the chief operating officer is Andy Hyett.

The Trust's clinical services are organised into three divisions: surgical services, medical services and Family and Clinical Support Service. Each division is led by a medical director who is supported by an operations director.

== Performance ==
Like many NHS hospitals the Trust has had difficulty in meeting the national target in its emergency department which has seen a rise of nearly 8% in patient numbers in 2014. In the year 2015/2016, HHFT failed this target which aims to see 95% of patients admitted to A&E discharged or admitted within 4 hours. The trust spent £4 million on agency staff in 2014/15.

In the week leading up to Christmas Day 2022, Hampshire Hospitals declared a critical incident at all sites, and was mirrored by South Central Ambulance Service, due to a high demand of patients seeking urgent and emergency care.

== Development ==
In 2014, the Trust announced plans for a new Critical Treatment Hospital to be built alongside a new £18.5m cancer treatment centre, on land at North Waltham, Hampshire. It would have a centralised obstetric labour unit and midwifery-led birthing centre, paediatric ward, central pathology laboratory, ambulance station, energy centre and a helicopter landing pad. The total cost of delivering the hospital was expected to be £150 million, of which £120 million was the cost of building. The project was halted by the local Clinical commissioning groups in November 2017 citing concerns that it was not affordable.

In December 2017, plans were announced for the building of the Winchester Hospice. This would be a 10 bedded hospice based in Winchester. The hospice opened in 2021.

In 2021 consultation will begin as part of the Hampshire Together Programme that will involve the upgrade of existing trust infrastructure.

== See also ==
- List of NHS trusts
