= Gosport War Memorial Hospital =

NHS hospital in Hampshire, England

- Hampshire and Isle of Wight Healthcare NHS Foundation Trust
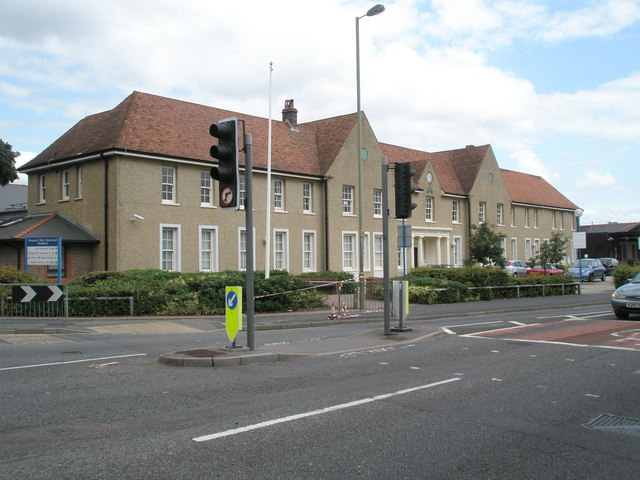
- Gosport War Memorial Hospital in 2009

- Location in Hampshire

Geography
- Location: Bury Road, Gosport, Hampshire, England
- Coordinates: 50.7931°N 1.1481°W

Organisation
- Care system: National Health Service
- Type: District General

History
- Founded: 1921

Links
- Website: www.southernhealth.nhs.uk/our-services/our-main-sites-and-locations/gosport-war-memorial-hospital

Gosport War Memorial Hospital is a hospital in Gosport, Hampshire, England, formerly part of the Southern Health NHS Foundation Trust but now part of Hampshire and Isle of Wight Healthcare NHS Foundation Trust.

== History ==
=== Early history ===
The hospital was built as a memorial to members of the Portsmouth Division of the Royal Marine Light Infantry based at Forton Barracks who had died in the First World War. Its foundation stone was laid by Field Marshal Earl Haig on 3 July 1921. The hospital opened on 19 April 1923. The East Wing was added in 1932 and the Canon Landon memorial clock, which recognised the life of Canon Guy Landon, Rector of Alverstoke from 1907 to 1947, was added following his death.

=== NHS ===
The hospital joined the National Health Service in 1948. New out-patient and accident and emergency departments were added in 1963 and a physical medicine and x-ray facility was added in 1966. A petition with 20,000 signatures prevented the hospital from closing in the early 1980s. In 1991 £10.5m provided to create a new community hospital for Gosport was used to extend the hospital, the work being completed in 1995. This provided beds for General Practitioner, elderly mental health, and maternity services, as well as two new day hospitals. (Note: Within the context of this site several independent unit buildings appear referred to as hospitals.)

=== 1990s opioid deaths ===
On 20 June 2018, after an enquiry which took four years and cost £14 million, the Gosport Independent Panel published a report which found that 456 deaths in the 1990s had "followed inappropriate administration of opioid drugs". Assistant Chief Constable Nick Downing, head of the Serious Crime Directorate for Kent and Essex Police, announced on 30 April 2019 that a new criminal investigation into the deaths was to take place.

=== 21st century ===
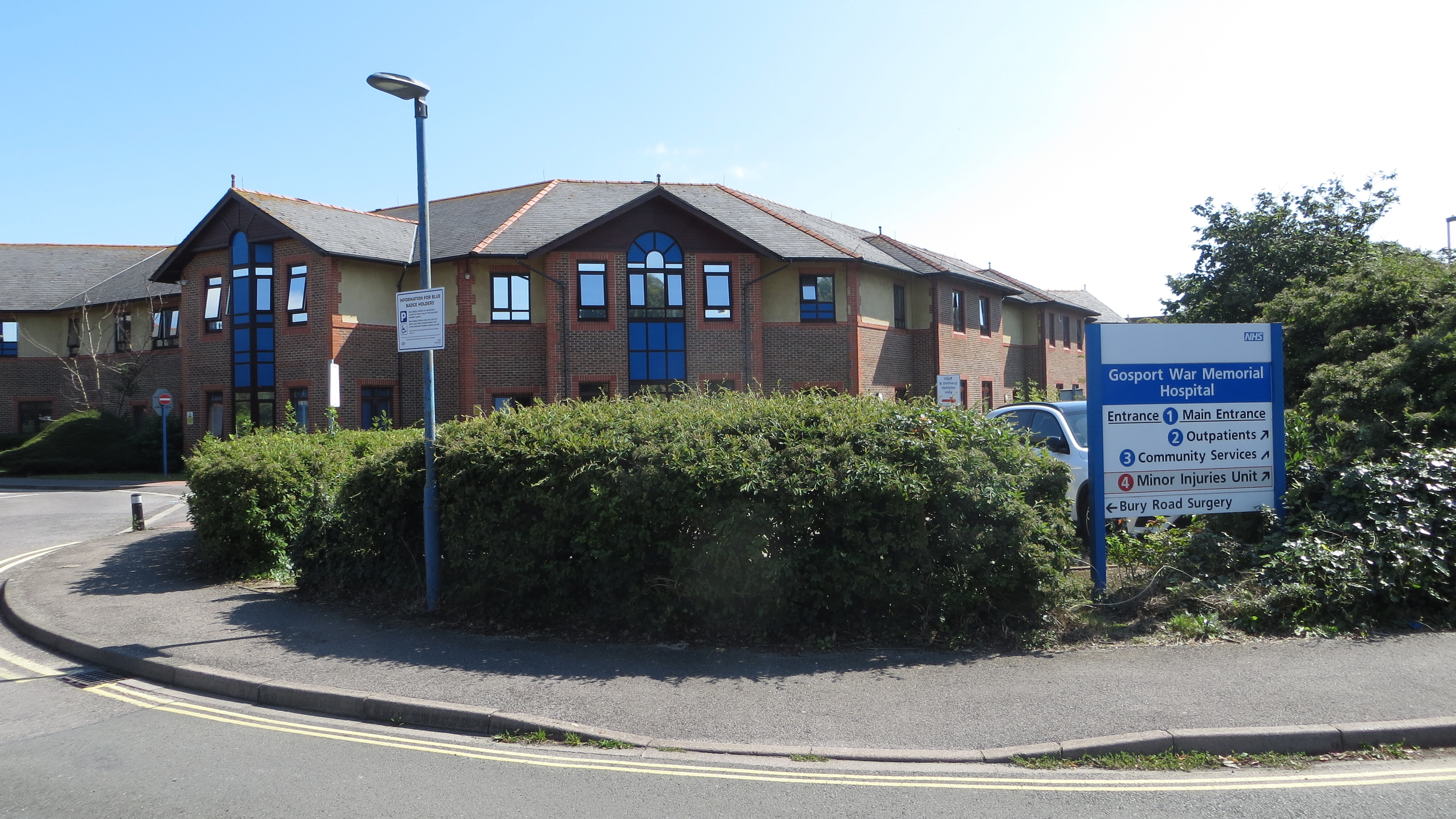
The vehicle entrance to the modern part of the hospital from St. Ann's Hill Road, the actual entrance is a little to the left of this image

The extended site now provides inpatient and outpatient services for the local community following the closure of the nearby Royal Hospital Haslar and to complement services provided by the expanded Queen Alexandra General Hospital in Cosham which was completed in 2009. There are four in-patient wards with a total of 70 beds, offering rehabilitation or caring for older people with acute mental health needs. The minor injuries unit, operated by Portsmouth Hospitals University NHS Trust, was upgraded to an urgent treatment centre in 2021.
