= Hampshire and Isle of Wight Healthcare NHS Foundation Trust =

NHS foundation trust in the South of England

- Type: NHS foundation trust
- Established: 1 October 2024
- Headquarters: Calmore, Hampshire, England
- Hospitals: Fareham Community Hospital; Gosport War Memorial Hospital; Lymington New Forest Hospital; Petersfield Hospital; Romsey Community Hospital; Western Community Hospital
- Website: hiowhealthcare.nhs.uk

Hampshire and Isle of Wight Healthcare NHS Foundation Trust is an NHS foundation trust which provides community health, mental health and learning disability services across Hampshire and the Isle of Wight.

== History ==
The trust was formed on 1 October 2024 following the merger of Solent NHS Trust and Southern Health NHS Foundation Trust and also incorporates the community and mental health services formerly provided by the Isle of Wight NHS Trust. The merger was approved in November 2023 and was originally planned for April 2024, but was delayed twice.
