= Oxford Health NHS Foundation Trust =

NHS mental health trust

- Type: NHS foundation trust
- Headquarters: Littlemore Mental Health Centre; Sandford Road; Littlemore; Oxford; OX4 4XN
- Staff: 4,794 (2018/19)
- Website: www.oxfordhealth.nhs.uk

Oxford Health NHS Foundation Trust is an NHS foundation trust that provides physical, mental health and social care for people of all ages across Oxfordshire, Buckinghamshire, Swindon, Wiltshire, Bath and North East Somerset. Its services are delivered at community bases, hospitals, clinics and people's homes.

The trust runs Warneford Hospital in Headington, Oxford and has close links to the universities of Oxford, Oxford Brookes, Buckinghamshire, Reading and Bath. They are part of the Oxford Academic Health Science Centre, working closely with university colleagues to translate their findings into clinical care as quickly as possible, enabling people using the services to benefit from the latest advances in healthcare.

The trust has established a Street Triage scheme where mental health professionals work alongside police officers between 5 p.m. and 4.30 a.m. every day so they can offer face-to-face advice, make accurate risk assessments and give care to the patient. It aims to avoid using custody as a place of safety and reduce the amount of time police officers spend on mental health incidents.

== Organisational history ==
Oxford Health NHS Foundation Trust was formed in February 2011 by the merger of Oxfordshire and Buckinghamshire Mental Health NHS Foundation Trust (OBMH) and Community Health Oxfordshire.

Before becoming a NHS foundation trust on 1 April 2008 the trust was named Oxfordshire & Buckinghamshire Mental Health Partnership NHS Trust (OBMH). The partnership NHS Trust was formed on 1 April 2006 by the merger of Oxfordshire Mental Healthcare NHS Trust and Buckinghamshire Mental Health NHS Trust. Oxfordshire Mental Healthcare NHS Trust had been established in April 1994, and Buckinghamshire Mental Health NHS Trust in April 2001.

== History ==
Since April 2010, the trust has provided tiers 3 and 4 of Child and Adolescent Mental Health Services (CAMHS) in Wiltshire and Bath and North East Somerset following a competitive tender. Previously this service had been operated by three providers, though primarily the Avon and Wiltshire Mental Health Partnership NHS Trust. The service is jointly funded by the NHS England and local authorities.

The Oxfordshire Clinical Commissioning Group established a five-year outcome based contract with the trust in September 2015. Twenty per-cent of the funding will be based on seven outcomes:

- People living longer
- People more able to function
- Timely access to support
- Carers feeling supported
- People having a meaningful role in society
- People having stable accommodation
- People having improved physical health

In July 2016, it was announced that the trust would take over community learning disability services in Oxfordshire from Southern Health NHS Foundation Trust as part of a plan to reduce the area served by the Southern trust.

In 2022 the trust implemented an electronic prescribing and medication administration solution from Better Meds. The trust is one of the NHS global digital exemplars using cloud-based technology.

== See also ==
- Oxford University Hospitals NHS Foundation Trust
- List of NHS trusts
