= Petersfield Hospital =

- Hampshire and Isle of Wight Healthcare NHS Foundation Trust
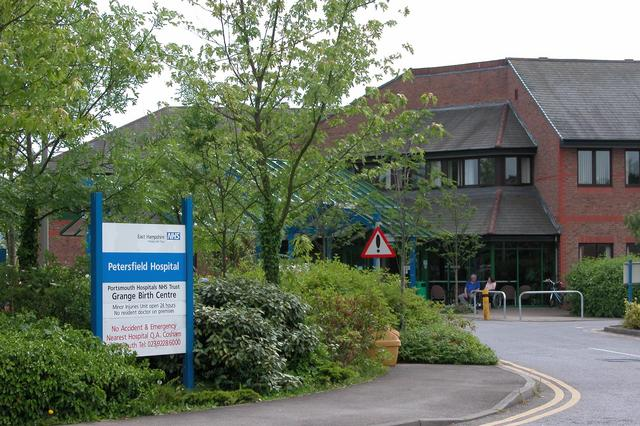
- Petersfield Hospital

- Shown in Hampshire

Geography
- Location: Swan Street, Petersfield, Hampshire, England, United Kingdom
- Coordinates: 51.0040°N 0.9423°W

Organisation
- Care system: Public NHS
- Type: Community

History
- Founded: 1871

Links
- Website: www.southernhealth.nhs.uk/locations/petersfield-community-hospital/
- Lists: Hospitals in England

Petersfield Hospital is a health facility in Swan Street, Petersfield, Hampshire, England. It is managed by Southern Health NHS Foundation Trust.

== History ==
The facility has its origins in the Petersfield Cottage Hospital which was established in Swan Street at the initiative of Dr. Albert Warren Leachman with five beds in April 1871. The hospital joined the National Health Service in 1948, but after it becoming dilapidated, it was replaced by a modern community hospital in 1992.
