= Fareham Community Hospital =

Community hospital in Fareham, Hampshire

- Hampshire and Isle of Wight Healthcare NHS Foundation Trust
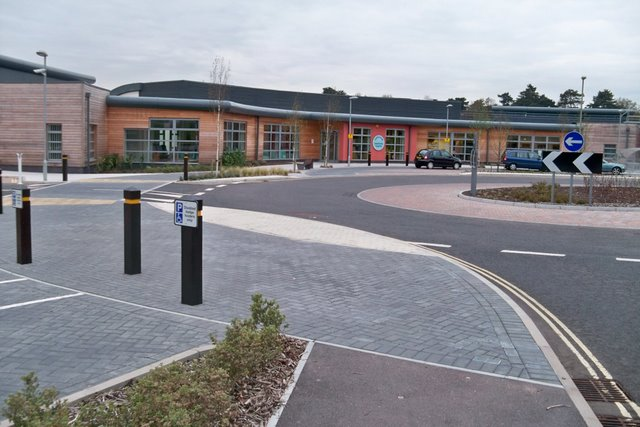
- Fareham Community Hospital

- Shown in Hampshire

Geography
- Location: Sarisbury, Hampshire, England, United Kingdom
- Coordinates: 50.8708°N 1.2755°W

Organisation
- Care system: National Health Service
- Type: Community

History
- Founded: 2010

Links
- Website: www.southernhealth.nhs.uk/locations/fareham-community-hospital/

Fareham Community Hospital is a healthcare facility at Brook Lane in Sarisbury, Hampshire, England. It is managed by the Southern Health NHS Foundation Trust.

== History ==
The facility was procured under a Private Finance Initiative contract in 2007. It was built by Morgan Sindall at a cost of £10 million and opened in 2010. In 2018 it was estimated that its rooms were only being used 40% of each day and, as such, the hospital was not being used to its full potential.
