= Tatchbury Mount Hospital =

- Hampshire and Isle of Wight Healthcare NHS Foundation Trust
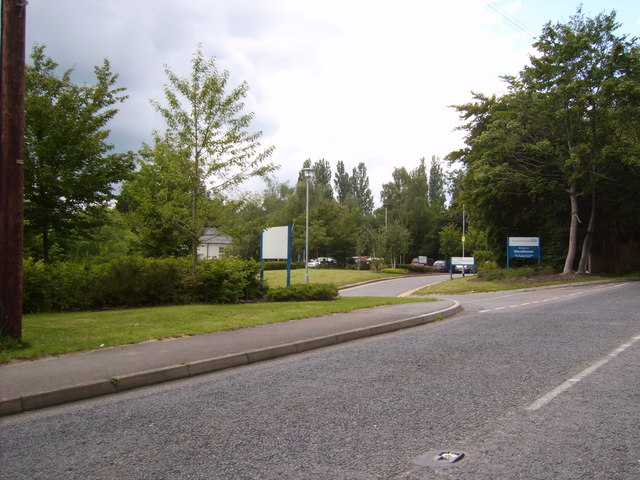
- The Eastern entrance to the Tatchbury Mount site where Austen House is located.

- Location in Hampshire

Geography
- Location: Totton, Hampshire, England
- Coordinates: 50.9309°N 1.5292°W

Organisation
- Care system: NHS
- Type: Psychiatric hospital

Services
- Emergency department: No

History
- Founded: 1931

Links
- Website: www.southernhealth.nhs.uk
- Lists: Hospitals in England

Tatchbury Mount Hospital is a health facility to the north of Totton, Hampshire, England. It is managed by the Hampshire and Isle of Wight Healthcare NHS Foundation Trust and acts as the Trust's headquarters. The site was formerly a large psychiatric hospital with the majority of the buildings on the site dedicated to this purpose, however in recent years changes in the management of these patients has resulted in the uses for the site diversifying.

== History ==
=== Iron age hillfort ===
At the South West of the present site lies the remains of an oval shaped Iron Age multivallate Hillfort which was at one point part of the hospital but now stands vacant. The fort is 2 hectares in size on the interior surrounded by two parallel banks 3 metres and 4.5 metres tall with a separated by a terrace 6 metres wide. These banks once surrounded the entire site, but due to landscaping in the late 18th century, it is diminished on its eastern side. It is a Scheduled Ancient Monument having been listed on 18 July 2000.

A Roman road, given the number 423, used to run by the entrance to the hillfort, around its eastern edge and across the hospital site running North to Shorn Hill and South to Lepe.

=== Manor houses ===
The area occupied by the hospital today was occupied by two manors in the 19th century. The eastern part of the site, now occupied by Austen House, was the site of Loperwood Manor. It was later reused as hospital offices but was vacated due to poor repair in 1973 and was demolished c.1975 The former coach house of this manor built in the mid 19th century survives on the site and is Grade II listed.

The hillfort area also contained a private house known as Tatchbury Manor which was completed in the early 19th century. Tenants included Sir Daniel Fulthorpe Gooch, 3rd Baronet. As part of the construction, the hillfort and summit was landscaped and planted with trees to form a formal gardens. It remained as a private residence until 1927 when it was put up for sale by the Timson family. The house remained in use by the hospital until it fell into disrepair around the millennium and was demolished in 2006 having been excluded from the scheduling of the hillfort.

=== Hospital ===
Tatchbury Manor and the wider site was acquired by Hampshire County Council and re-opened as a colony for mental defectives in 1931. It was a major psychiatric hospital for the Western part of Hampshire until the 1970s and at its peak contained 900 patients. It was also the administrative centre for the Coldharbour and Tatchbury Mount Management Committee, the former a hospital for people with learning disabilities in Sherborne, Dorset which diminished in importance following a fire at the site in 1972. Following the Care in the Community programme, the site was decreased in size as more patients were instead treated in the community and not in hospitals such as Tatchbury Mount resulting in many of the patient buildings on the site falling out of use or being demolished in the 1980s and 1990s.

Daniel Rosenthal, a convicted murderer, went missing from the hospital in August 2013; he was subsequently found and returned to the facility.

== Facilities ==
The site contains four healthcare buildings which have a focus on mental health services, three of which are contained within the main area of the site. Bluebird House provides specialist assessment and treatment for young people aged 12–18 years of age and is classified as a secure mental health inpatient unit. It occupies the southern part of the main area and was granted planning permission in May 2006 to replace the Greenwood and Firs lodges in that location.

Adjacent to this to the east is Southfield which provides specialist care and treatment for 18-65 year olds with serious mental illness. It is classified as a low secure forensic unit and contains 28 beds. It was granted planning permission in March 2004, replacing the Pines lodge on the same site.

To the west of Bluebird House is Ashford a ten-bed unit for men with learning disabilities that have been sectioned under the Mental Health Act 1983. It replaced the Rufus Lodge and opened in October 2020 at a cost of £10 million and marks the return of this service to the site, which had to temporarily move to Fareham while its previous home at Woodhaven was being converted to become Austen House.

The final unit is located to the east of the main site and is accessed separately from the rest it. It is located on the former site of Loperwood Manor, which was demolished c.1975 and was built 2002-2003 as a 36-bed mental health unit called Woodhaven. Woodhaven was closed in 2012. In September 2019 the facility reopened after a £7 million refurbishment as Austen House, a 14-bed low secure forensic hospital for young people aged 12–18 years of age. It is the only low secure unit of this type in the South of England and prevented patients from travelling around 100 miles for the closest alternative.

The western section of the main site contains Forest Court, an 80-bed nursing home owned and run by Hampshire County Council.

The remaining five buildings on the site, plus ancillary, are the headquarters of the Southern Health NHS Foundation Trust. The site is served by an infrequent rural bus service on a circular route between Totton and Cadnam three times a day on two days a week.

== See also ==
- History of psychiatric institutions
- Southern Health NHS Foundation Trust
- List of NHS trusts in England
