= Cheshire and Wirral Partnership NHS Foundation Trust =

Healthcare trust in England

- Type: Mental health and community health trust
- Established: 1 July 2007
- Chair: Mike Maier
- Chief executive: Sheena Cumiskey
- Website: www.cwp.nhs.uk

Cheshire and Wirral Partnership NHS Foundation Trust (CWP) provides mental health services, learning disability services and substance misuse services across Cheshire and Wirral, England. Additionally it provides various specialist services in Liverpool, Bolton, Warrington, Halton and Trafford, and community health services in Western Cheshire.

CWP has around 14,700 foundation trust members. It employs more than 4,500 staff across 73 sites and serves a population of over a million people.

== History ==
The Trust was established in 2002 as the Cheshire and Wirral Partnership NHS Trust. They achieved NHS foundation trust status in July 2007.

In July 2013 the trust selected Ryhurst Ltd as preferred bidder for a comprehensive range of Facilities Management services in a partnership which will last for an initial 15-year period, with an option to extend for a further five years.

== Facilities ==
The trust runs a Health and Education Assessment Unit at Adcote House, involving animal-assisted therapy; three general practices in Cheshire (Old Hall Surgery and Westminster Surgery in Ellesmere Port, and Willaston Surgery in Willaston) which were taken over as the practices could not recruit new partners; and Springview Hospital, an acute psychiatric hospital with five wards (including a psychiatric intensive-care unit) in Clatterbridge Health Park.

== Performance ==
It was named by the Health Service Journal as one of the top hundred NHS trusts to work for in 2015. At that time it had 2,986 full-time equivalent staff and a sickness absence rate of 5.61%. 67% of staff recommend it as a place for treatment and 61% recommended it as a place to work. In the 2016 NHS Staff Survey it did best of all mental health, learning disability and community trusts.

== See also ==
- List of NHS trusts
