= Coldeast =

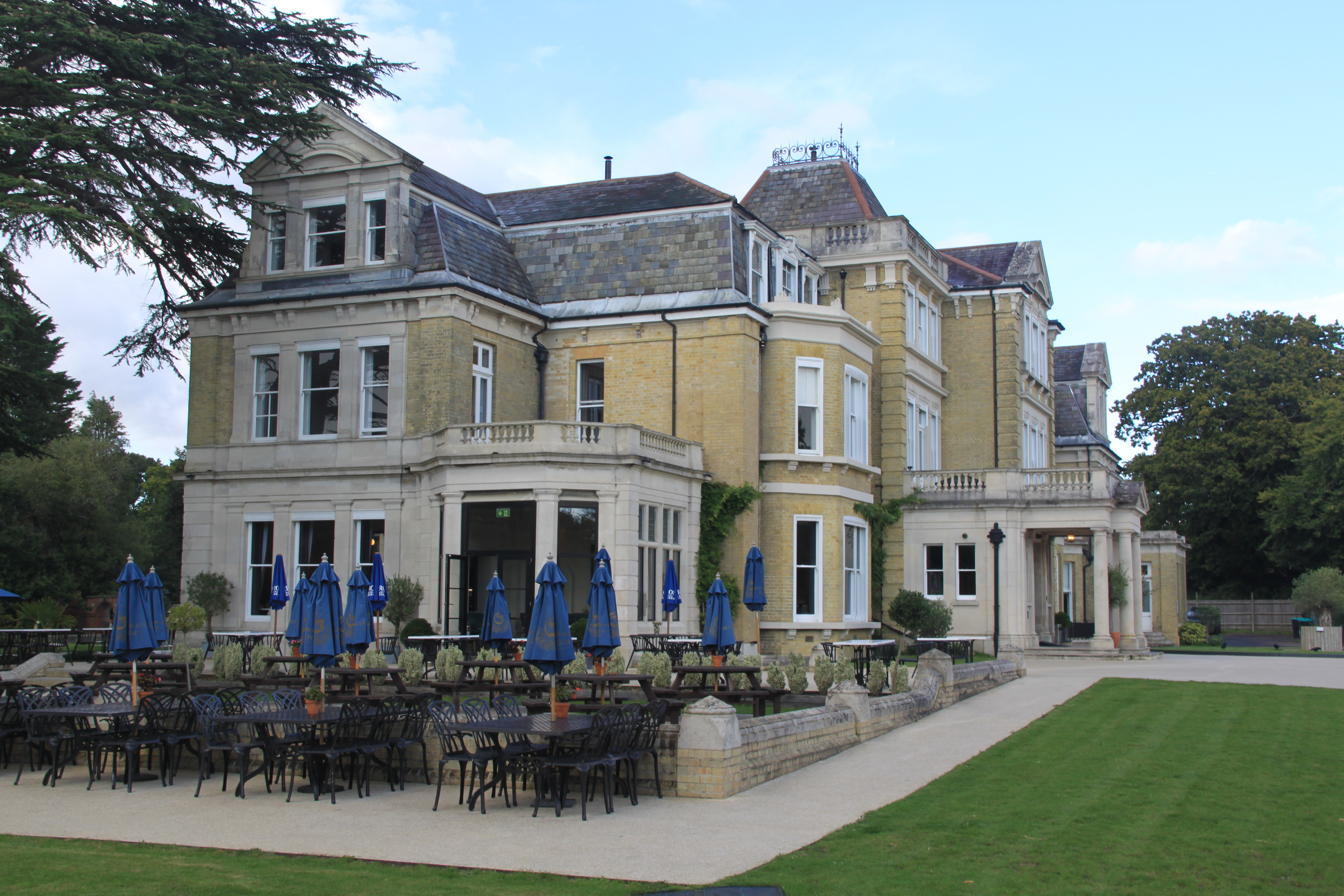
- Coldeast in September 2024

- Shown in Hampshire

Geography
- Location: Fareham Borough, England, United Kingdom
- Coordinates: 50.86987°N 1.28254°W

Organisation
- Care system: Public NHS
- Type: Public

Services
- Emergency department: No Accident & Emergency

History
- Founded: 1924
- Closed: 1996

Links
- Lists: Hospitals in England

Coldeast is a former manor house and former psychiatric hospital between Park Gate and Sarisbury in Hampshire, England. The house is used today as a wedding and conference venue and much of the former grounds are being redeveloped for housing and the construction of a new leisure centre.

== Location ==
Coldeast is situated in the Park Gate ward of Fareham Borough, between Park Gate itself and Sarisbury. The site is a little over 0.6 miles (0.97 km) northeast of the River Hamble.

== History ==
Previously part of the manors of Titchfield and Swanwick, Cold East Farm was located on the site of today's manor house in 1765. In 1837 it was owned by Robert Cawte and occupied by William Cawte, but a few years later was in the hands of the Hornby family.

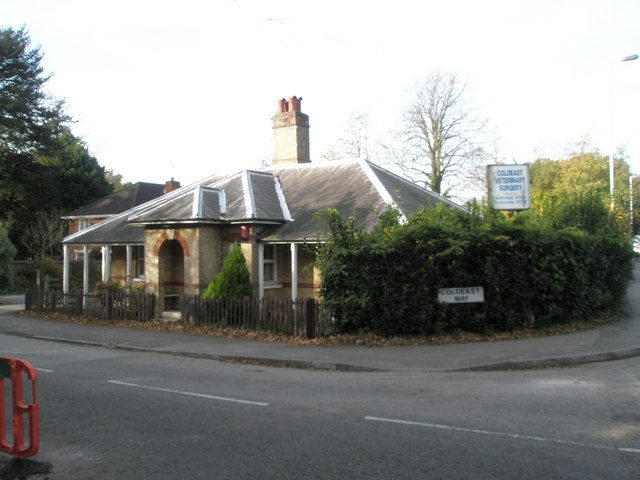
One of the former lodges in 2007, being used as a veterinary surgery

It was occupied by horse trader Arthur Hornby by the 1840s and the 1851 census shows that three staff lived there with him. The Hornby family were wealthy local landowners, and extended the house and grounds during their tenure, adding stables, dungeon, outhouses, two lodge houses and carriage drives lined by avenues of trees, all of which appear on the Ordnance Survey map of 1868. As well as Coldeast the family owned Hook House near Warsash, where William Hornby lived until his death in 1869. Arthur Hornby inherited the house and decided to move there, selling Coldeast, which was described as his "favourite abode" in the sales notice. The notice described a moderate sized house and listed pleasure grounds, kitchen gardens, vineries, parkland, heathland and sea views among the assets on the 150-acre (61 ha) estate.

Nathaniel and Emma Montefiore bought the estate in 1870 and continued to develop it, adding glasshouses and formalising the grounds, reflected on the Ordnance Survey maps of 1897 and 1909. Their son, Claude Montefiore, spent part of his childhood there in the early 20th century. The estate was sold again in 1924 to Hampshire County Council by a Mr L G Montefiore. The council added a further 170 acres (69 ha) to the estate and converted it to use as a psychiatric hospital, adding a boundary fence and ditch alongside the main road and building additional patient accommodation on the site.

During the Second World War, part of the site was occupied by an emergency hospital and allotments. The formal gardens were largely unchanged but the more able patients were encouraged to take part in farming some of the land until 1964, when parts of the estate were sold off for housing.

The house was granted listed building status but the conversion to a hospital meant many of the original features of the house were removed or replaced, including a large oval staircase which was replaced by concrete steps, and the national listed building status was revoked. However the house, along with the stables, dairy cottage, cart shed, lodge houses, gate piers and associated wing walls were all still locally listed as of 2011. The complex was left empty in 1996 and began to decay.

By around 2009, plans had been made for the house to be converted into a hotel but the developer pulled out and a new property developer took on the restoration of the house. The building was rotten and infested by pigeons, with water pouring through the floors and filling the basement.

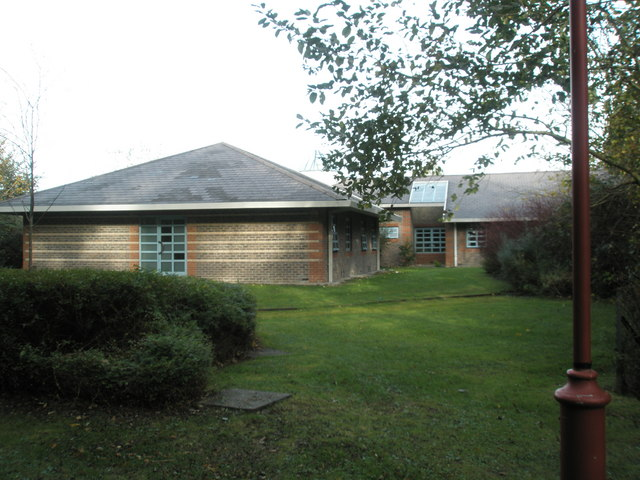
The Meadows, in use as an outpatients centre in November 2007

The neighbouring Fareham Community Hospital was opened in 2010 and the Meadows psychiatric unit which had been built in the grounds of the house closed in 2012. The South East Hampshire Clinical commissioning group decided that the Coldeast site was no longer required for the NHS in August 2013 and it was likely that the original house would be demolished and replaced by modern housing.

However, in 2015 the process to restore and convert of the house into a wedding and conference venue was completed, with three main event rooms on the ground floor and 38 suites upstairs. The garden had been completely overgrown but was also being restored, with the original walled garden reported to be "in a lovely state" in March 2015. Meanwhile, the remaining former hospital site was still in the process of being sold by the NHS; NHS Property Services sold a section of the site spanning 4.6 hectares (11 acres) to a housing developer and Southern Health NHS Foundation Trust sold a 2.5 acres (1.0 ha) portion in June 2015.

Fareham Borough Council had taken on some of the property, building Holly Hill Leisure Centre at a cost of £7 million and a sheltered housing complex costing £5 million.
