= Betty Nicolas =

Betty Nicolas FRCN
- Born: 1921
- Died: 1991 (aged 69–70); Australia
- Occupation: nurse
- Employer: General Nursing Council

Betty Nicolas (1921 - 1991) SRN RMN RNT FRCN was a British nurse recognised for her leadership in mental health nursing, contributing to nursing education reforms in the UK and internationally. She contributed notably towards aligning UK nursing standards with those of the European Economic Community (EEC). She also became a member of the Jay Committee of Inquiry into Mental Handicap Nursing, published in 1979.

== Early career ==
Nicolas initially qualified as a mental health nurse in 1945 at the First Gloucester Mental Hospital, Wooton, Gloucester. She subsequently qualified as a General Nurse in 1950 at the Jersey General Hospital, Jersey, Channel Islands. She returned to psychiatric nursing becoming a ward sister and assistant matron at St. James' Hospital, Portsmouth.

In 1955 Nicolas qualified as a Registered Nurse Tutor after studying at Battersea College of Technology. She then became a Sister Tutor at Guy's Hospital in London. She returned to St. James' Hospital and 1956 - 1958 served there as Principal Tutor.

== Further career ==
In 1958 Nicolas joined the staff of the General Nursing Council (GNC) for England and Wales as an inspector of nurse training schools. Between 1967 - 1970 Nicolas held the role of International Secretary at the Royal College of Nursing (RCN) where she contributed to the RCN's work with the European Economic Community (EEC), Nicolas had the asset of speaking fluent French. She also undertook the role of the GNC's representative for nursing within the EEC. In 1970 Nicolas served as Education Officer with the GNC, where within her role she focused on mental health training. She played a pivotal role co-ordinating work to revise mental and mental handicap nursing syllabuses.

As both Inspector for Nurse Training Schools and Education Officer of the GNC, Nicolas provided leadership and encouraged progress within the speciality of psychiatric nursing. In 1980 Nicolas argued for learners in the psychiatric nursing field to be given student status. She pointed out that a large proportion of existing psychiatric hospitals did not have full approval for training. Nicolas served on the controversial 1979 Jay Committee of Enquiry into Mental Handicap Nursing and Care.

During her time at the RCN Nicolas earned a scholarship to study in the USA and Canada. In 1977, Nicolas gained a Bachelor of Arts degree at the Open University.

== Honours ==
In 1980 Nicolas was awarded Fellow of the Royal College of Nursing (FRCN).

== Publications ==
Nicolas, B., with Collins, S.M., Bent,E.A., Pyne, R.H., The Euro-nurse: theory or reality.

Nicolas, B., British Nurses and the Common Market.

== Death ==
Betty Nicolas died in Australia on 27 December 1991 while on a visit to her son.
