= Romsey Community Hospital =

- Hampshire and Isle of Wight Healthcare NHS Foundation Trust
- Romsey Community Hospital

- Shown in Hampshire

Geography
- Location: Romsey, Hampshire, England
- Coordinates: 50.992361°N 1.48186°W

Organisation
- Care system: NHS

Services
- Beds: 19

History
- Founded: 1899

The Romsey Community Hospital is a hospital in Romsey, England. the current site opened in 1931 and is operated by the Southern Health NHS Foundation Trust.

== History ==
The hospital has its origins in a small cottage hospital on Greatbridge Road which was official opened as the Jubilee Nursing Home by Princess Victoria in 1899. The hospital moved to a new facility which opened on Winchester Hill in 1931. The hospital was extended to create a new theatre recovery area in 2002.

== Services ==
The hospital provides community outpatient services and has two wards with 19 beds in total intended to rehabilitate people for return to their homes swiftly after operations. Where returning to their home is not possible, they aim to find a more appropriate placement.

Outpatient services offered include phlebotomy, X-Rays, podiatry, physiotherapy and clinics covering diabetes, orthopaedic choices, leg ulcers and wounds. There are also urology services provided by University Hospital Southampton NHS Foundation Trust.

== Lantern Seat ==
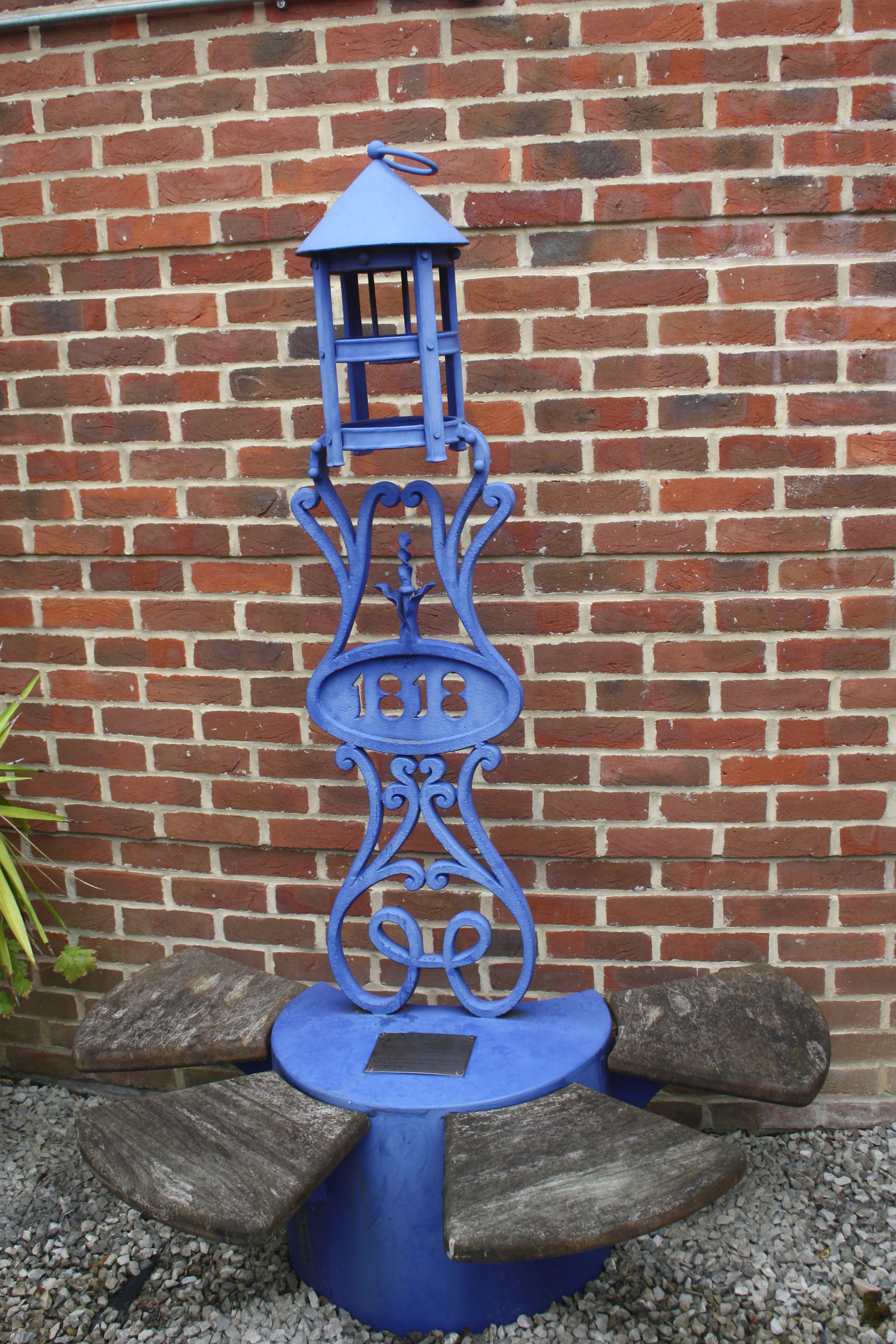
The Lantern Seat, Romsey Hospital

Located outside the front of the hospital is the Lantern Seat. The 1818 back panel in this seat was rescued by Donald Baker of Mead Mill Romsey during the demolition of the sounding arch at Embley Park – the home of Florence Nightingale (The Lady of the Lamp). Don commissioned local blacksmith, Richard Bent of Braishfield, to design and make the seat in the spring of 2004.

== See also ==
- List of hospitals in England
