= Peng Tee Khaw =

Chinese-Malaysian British consultant ophthalmic surgeon

Sir Peng Tee Khaw is a Chinese-Malaysian British consultant ophthalmic surgeon at Moorfields Eye Hospital in London, specialising in adult and paediatric glaucoma.

== Career ==
Khaw was born on 8 October 1957 in Singapore. His father, Tan Sri Khaw Kai Boh, was a cabinet member of Tunku Abdul Rahman. His family moved back to Malaysia soon after, and he studied at Victoria Institution in Kuala Lumpur before leaving for the UK.

Khaw studied medicine at Southampton University Medical School and qualified in 1980. He subsequently joined Moorfields in 1987 and specialised in adult and paediatric glaucoma (1989-1994), simultaneously preparing for his PhD in "ocular wound healing and advanced therapies to prevent scarring". He has perhaps the greatest experience in his field in the United Kingdom and he has developed techniques for glaucoma surgery that are now in worldwide use.

Khaw is Director of the National Institute of Health's Biomedical Research Centre at Moorfields, and University College London's Institute of Ophthalmology. He has raised more than £120 million for research and buildings including funding for the world's largest Children's Eye Hospital and translational research clinical centre.

=== Professional memberships ===
- Honorary Doctor of Science (Anglia Ruskin University)
- Honorary Fellow of the College of Optometrists
- Fellow of the Association for Research in Vision and Ophthalmology
- Fellow of the Royal College of Pathologists
- Fellow of the Academy of Medical Sciences
- Fellow of the Society of Biology
- Fellow of the Royal College of Physicians
- Honorary Fellow of the Royal College of Surgeons of England
- Fellow of the Royal College of Ophthalmologists
- Fellow of the Royal College of Physicians and Surgeons of Glasgow
- Diploma Ophthalmology (Royal College of Surgeons of England)
- Member of the Royal College of Physicians (UK)

=== Professional and academic posts ===
- Consultant Ophthalmic Surgeon, Moorfields Eye Hospital since 1993.
- Professor of Glaucoma and Ocular healing, University College London, since 1997
- Director, National Institute of Health Biomedical Research Centre since 2007
- Director of Research and Development since 2008
- Programme Director "Eyes and Vision Theme" UCL Partners since 2009

== Awards and decorations ==
- Honorary Fellowship of The Royal College of Ophthalmologist (2021)
- Awarded Senior Investigator status (one of 200 in the UK) by the National Institute for Health Research (2008, re-awarded in 2013)
- Department of Health Platinum Clinical Excellence Award (one of 200 in the UK)
- Gold Award, Association for Research in Vision and Ophthalmology Health Science Innovator (2014)
- Knight Bachelor (2013)
- Arthur Lim Gold Medal Lecture, Singapore National Eye Centre (2011)
- The Four Liveries' Medal & Lecture. City of London (2011)
- European Association for Vision and Eye Research Ophthalmic Research Award and Lecture, Greece (2010)
- “Ambassador” of Fight for Sight Charity (2008)
