= Portsmouth Hospitals University NHS Trust =

General Hospital in Hampshire, England

- Type: NHS trust
- Established: 4 November 1992
- Headquarters: Cosham, Portsmouth, Hampshire, England
- Hospitals: Queen Alexandra Hospital
- Chair: Melloney Poole
- Chief executive: Penny Emerit
- Staff: 7,840 (2022)
- Website: www.porthosp.nhs.uk

Portsmouth Hospitals University NHS Trust is an NHS trust which provides healthcare services to Portsmouth and surrounding areas of Hampshire, and select services to a wider area. It runs the Queen Alexandra Hospital.

== History ==
The trust was established as the Portsmouth Hospitals NHS Trust on 4 November 1992, and became operational on 1 April 1993. It took its current name on 29 July 2020.

The trust formed a strategic partnership with the Isle of Wight NHS Trust in 2019, aimed at addressing the sustainability of certain small-scall acute services on the Isle of Wight, and as of June 2023 the two trusts share a chair and chief executive.

== Performance ==
In January 2014 the trust was the subject of an investigation by the Cabinet Office after the leaders of three clinical commissioning groups complained about recurring breaches of the cancer waiting time standard, delays in treatment and poor performance in the Accident and Emergency Department. The Friends and Family Test score for the Trust in October 2013 was the lowest in England.

The trust was one of 26 responsible for half of the national growth in patients waiting more than four hours in accident and emergency over the 2014/5 winter. In 2017-18 only 75.3% of A&E patients were seen within four hours.

The Care Quality Commission raised concerns about severe overcrowding in the A&E department after an inspection in 2015. They found that "some patients with serious conditions had waited over an hour to be assessed".

It was named by the Health Service Journal as one of the top hundred NHS trusts to work for in 2015. At that time it had 5645 full time equivalent staff and a sickness absence rate of 3.65%. 66% of staff recommend it as a place for treatment and 59% recommended it as a place to work.

In February 2016 it was expecting a deficit of £25.7 million for the year 2015/6. In the last quarter of 2015 it had one of the worst performances of any hospital in England against the four hour waiting target.

A Care Quality Commission inspection in February and March 2016 found severe problems in the Accident and Emergency Department. Sir Mike Richards said: "During our inspection, CQC staff had to intervene to keep patients safe on several occasions, including asking staff to assess patients in the ambulance and the corridor, and to prevent a patient from leaving the department when there was not a member of staff present." There was "regular, significant and substantial overcrowding" in the emergency department and inspectors found patients with stroke, chest pain and sepsis who "had not been triaged, treated and assessed in a timely manner". Delays in ambulance handovers led to significant problems for South Central Ambulance Service.

In January 2018 it announced that it was expecting to end the financial year with a £37 million deficit, rather than the £10 million surplus previously forecast. This appears to be related to "Extreme" pressures on emergency care which caused more spending on agency staff, the outsourcing of elective procedures, missing income from cancelled activity, and increased drugs costs.

In March 2018 it was the seventeenth worst performer in A&E in England, with only 63.5% of patients in the main A&E seen within 4 hours.

In 2007 the radiology department decided to deprioritise the reporting of "plain film" x-rays (as opposed to CT or MRI scans) because of rising demand and shortage of staff. By 2017 there was a backlog of more than 30,000 mostly chest x-rays which had not been reviewed by a radiologist or appropriately trained clinician.

== See also ==
- Isle of Wight NHS Trust
