= Daniel Rosenthal (criminal) =

American-French criminal

- Born: 1954 or 1955 (age 69–70)

Daniel Rosenthal is an American-French criminal who murdered his mother in 1981 in Hampshire, England. He is suspected of dismembering his mother's body with a hacksaw, though her body was never found. He is suspected of earlier killing his father in Paris, dismembering his body and disposing of it in the French countryside.

As a schizophrenic, Rosenthal was detained at Tatchbury Mount Hospital from which he escaped on 10 August 2013. He was recaptured the following day in Southampton. Prior to this he had spent nearly 30 years being treated at Ashworth Hospital in Merseyside. He was 58 years old when he escaped and was recaptured.

His case was featured in an episode, Mad Scientist, of the TV documentary How I Caught The Killer.
