= Queen Alexandra Hospital =

General hospital near Portsmouth, England

- Portsmouth Hospitals University NHS Trust
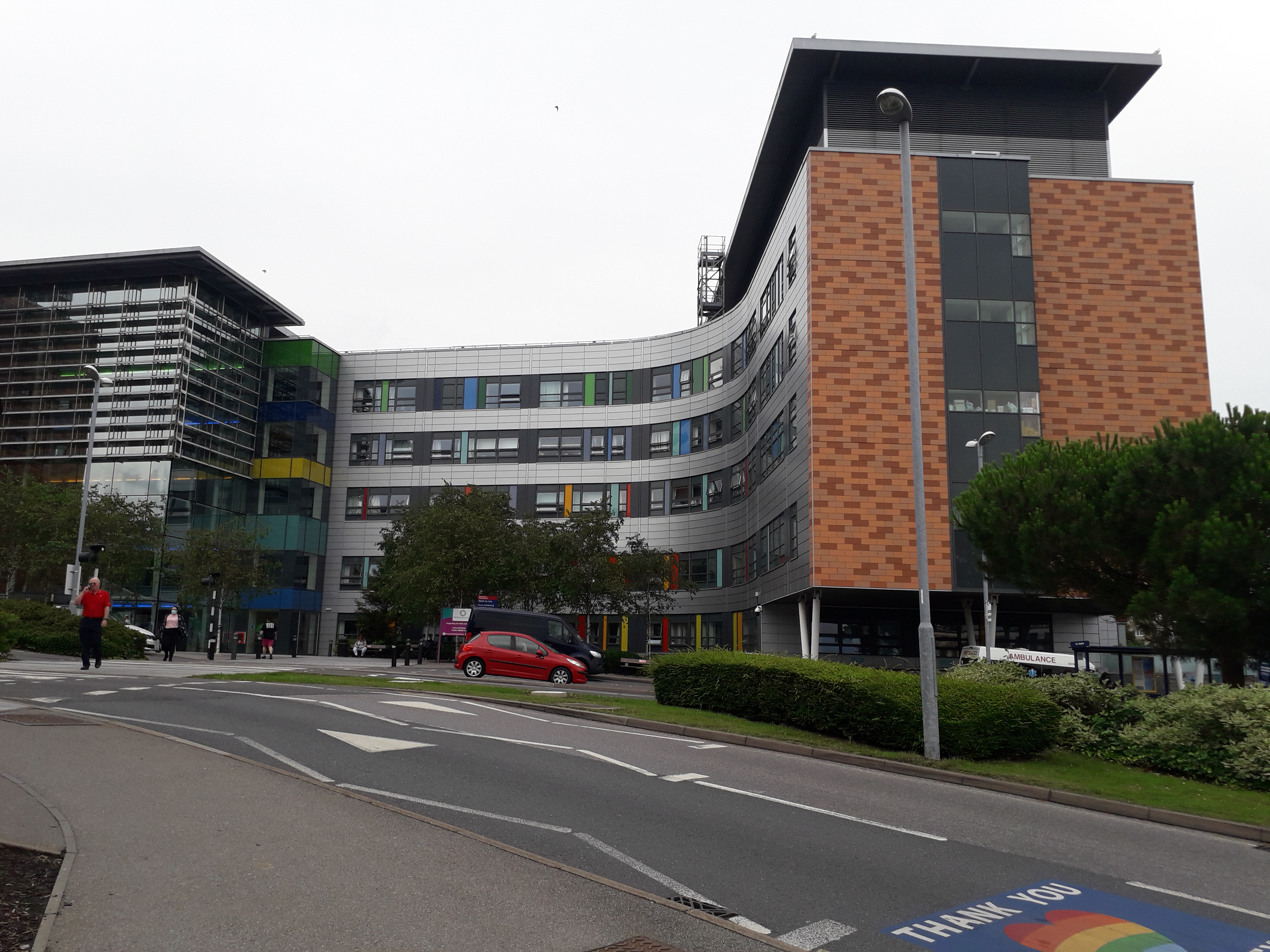
- The hospital in 2021

- Shown in Hampshire

Geography
- Location: Cosham, Portsmouth, Hampshire, England
- Coordinates: 50.8505°N 1.0683°W

Organisation
- Care system: National Health Service
- Type: Military, Teaching, District General
- Affiliated university: University of Portsmouth; University of Southampton School of Medicine

Services
- Emergency department: Yes
- Beds: 1,200

History
- Founded: 1904

Links
- Website: www.porthosp.nhs.uk/locations/queen-alexandra-hospital/87492

The Queen Alexandra Hospital (commonly known as QA Hospital, QAH or simply QA) is a large NHS hospital in Portsmouth, Hampshire. Located in Cosham, it is run by Portsmouth Hospitals University NHS Trust and has a Ministry of Defence Hospital Unit attached.

== History ==
=== Early history ===
Originally a military hospital, The Queen Alexandra (named after Alexandra of Denmark) was built between 1904 and 1908 to replace an earlier hospital which stood in Lion Street in Portsea, Portsmouth. The original buildings were of red brick construction, and the site was in a largely rural area, linked to Portsmouth and the surrounding villages (now suburbs) by a tram service.

The demilitarisation of the hospital began in 1926 when it was handed to the Ministry of Pensions, to care for disabled ex-servicemen. The Second World War saw the first civilian patients admitted, and several temporary huts added to the site to increase capacity. As with many makeshift hospitals from the era, the huts stayed in place for several years after the war.

Following the creation of the National Health Service (NHS) in 1948, all but 100 of the 640 beds were transferred to the NHS in 1951, with the remainder reserved for ex-servicemen. A League of Friends was established one year later. Development of the hospital under the NHS was rapid, and a Cerebral Palsy Unit was built in 1955, with two classrooms, a physiotherapy room, a speech and language therapy room, a staff room, and a kitchen. The unit opened in 1956. This was followed in 1957 by an outpatients unit, and in 1958 by the hospital chapel.

In 1960 the existing buildings were upgraded with a new boiler system. The League of Friends funded two new day rooms, which were added in 1962, when the main block was refurbished. A library was added in 1969.

Later in the 1960s, it was announced that the Queen Alexandra would become a district general hospital, complete with an Accident and Emergency department. This involved the construction of several new buildings, which began in 1968 with an eye department, a training school for nurses and two three-storey blocks for staff accommodation. A further two accommodation blocks, this time nine storeys high, were added later, being completed in 1976. Only two of the planned three new ward blocks were built.

Patients were transferred from the Royal Portsmouth Hospital in 1979, with the Queen Alexandra Hospital, including a new breast unit, being officially opened a year later by Princess Alexandra. Over the subsequent three years, the South Block was refurbished, culminating in the Trevor Howell Day Hospital opening in 1983. Five years later, a new diabetes unit opened, followed by a rehabilitation unit in 1991.

=== 2000s ===
A further rebuilding of the hospital was announced in 1999 although the procurement under a private finance initiative contract was not completed until 2005. Some of the original buildings of the military hospital were demolished to make way for the new main hospital buildings. The works were designed by the Building Design Partnership and completed by Carillion at a cost of £236 million. In October 2009 the new Queen Alexandra Hospital was officially opened by The Princess Royal.

The annual payment the trust will make to its private sector contractor under the PFI contract is £32.866 million, subject to satisfactory performance by the contractor and other factors such as repayment and refinancing options. The contract is for 35 years; payments commence after 3.5 years upon the successful construction and handover of the new facilities to the trust.

A Care Quality Commission inspection in 2015 rated the trust as "outstanding" in relation to being caring and effective but needed to improve providing "safe, responsive and well-led services". Conditions in the accident and emergency department were so overcrowded that some patients with serious conditions had waited over an hour to be assessed.

=== 2020s ===
Work began in March 2021 to create a new 72 bed ward in what was previously the North Car Park, whilst plans for a new multi-story car park are in preparation, and longer term proposals for a £58m revamped Accident and Emergency Department are also being drawn up.

On 7 January 2022 the hospital declared a major incident following a water leak affecting ground floor clinical areas. This resulted in canceling appointments and diverting ambulances away from the hospital site.

On 6 April 2022 the hospital and South Central Ambulance Service both declared critical incidents in response to extreme demands on the emergency department and 999 services.

A further critical incident was declared in the week leading up to Christmas day 2022, again due to extreme demand, and was mirrored by critical incidents being declared by other local hospitals and the ambulance service.

== See also ==
- List of hospitals in England
