= St James' Hospital, Portsmouth =

St James' Hospital
- Formerly Solent NHS Trust
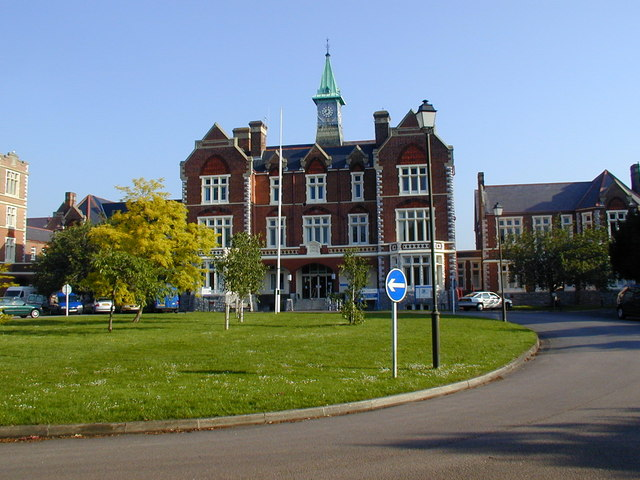
- St James' Hospital

- Shown in Hampshire

Geography
- Location: Milton, Portsmouth, Hampshire, England
- Coordinates: 50.79644°N 1.05006°W

Organisation
- Care system: NHS
- Type: Specialist

Services
- Speciality: Mental health

History
- Founded: 1879

Links
- Lists: Hospitals in England

St James' Hospital was a mental health facility at Milton, Portsmouth, Hampshire, England. It was managed by Solent NHS Trust. The main structure is a Grade II listed building.

== History ==
The hospital, which was designed by George Rake in the Gothic Revival style using a dual pavilion layout, opened as the Portsmouth Borough Asylum in September 1879. A sanatorium for the treatment of infectious diseases was completed in 1879 and the wards were extended in 1895. Four detached villas, designed by Albert Cogswell, were added in 1908. It became the Borough of Portsmouth Mental Hospital in 1914 and was requisitioned for military use during the First World War. After service as an Emergency Medical Service facility during the Second World War, it joined the National Health Service as St James' Hospital in 1948.

After the introduction of Care in the Community in the early 1980s, the hospital went into a period of decline and inpatient services significantly reduced. The land to the south of the hospital was registered as Portsmouth's first town green in 2001. By summer 2018, Solent NHS Trust only retained a small area of the site for mental health services. The site as a whole was marketed for redevelopment and sold to a property developer in January 2019.

== Notable staff ==
- Betty Nicolas was Assistant Matron and later Principal Tutor at St James'. She went on to be an Inspector of Nurse Training Schools and then Education Officer for the General Nursing Council.
