= Nurse-led clinic =

A nurse-led clinic is any outpatient clinic that is run or managed by registered nurses, usually nurse practitioners or Clinical Nurse Specialists in the UK. Nurse-led clinics have assumed distinct roles over the years, and examples exist within hospital outpatient departments, public health clinics and independent practice environments.

== Definition ==
A broad definition of a nurse-led clinic defines these clinics based on what nursing activities are performed at the site. Nurses within a nurse-led clinic assume their own patient case-loads, provide an educative role to patients to promote health, provide psychological support, monitor the patient's condition and perform nursing interventions. Advanced practice registered nurses, usually nurse practitioners, may have expanded roles within these clinics, depending on the scope of practice defined by their state, provincial or territorial government.

== Overview ==
The recent growth of nurse-led clinics is considered an emerging area of nursing practice; they were originally discussed in nursing journals in the 1980s, and developed over the 1990s into practice areas that have generated financial, legal and professional challenges over the years. There has been recent growth of nurse-led clinics both within hospitals and in the community. However, that growth has been unequal across different legislative regions. As an example, Canada's only known nurse-led clinics exist in Ontario. Unlike many clinics which exist in the United States, Ontario's clinics have been met with some criticism from the Ontario Medical Association and some family physicians who view nurse-led clinics to be unproven innovations in primary care.

In Kenya, advanced nursing practice developed in the 2005 in response to increased health needs and cost, and in keeping with health policy. A later impetus came from the "New deal for junior doctors" which was a government response to the European Community directive to reduce junior doctors' hours of work.

Nurse-led clinics typically focus on chronic disease management: conditions where regular follow-up and expertise is required, but also where a patient may not necessarily need to see a physician at every visit. Most nurse-led clinics use nursing theory and knowledge to educate patients and form care plans to manage their conditions.

== Nursing consultations ==
In their consultations, nurses undertake a range of activities. This may include a specific task such as giving patient education, assessment and management of cardiovascular risks, managing blood pressure, exacerbations of COPD and overall disease management.

== Review of evidence ==
Nurse-led clinics have a brief history of evaluation in scientific literature. Not only is there a large amount of heterogeneity between nurse-led clinics, but there are also different educational backgrounds for nurses who wish to enter these roles.

In a partially blind randomized controlled trial, adult patients with Type II Diabetes were found to have better control of hypertension and hyperlipidemia in a nurse-led clinic when compared to conventional follow-up care. A related study also found that nurse-led clinics were more effective than conventional care in controlling hypertension for adult patients with Type II Diabetes and uncontrolled hypertension. Generally, it was found that most patients experienced improved outcomes following nurse-led clinic consultation, with the best improvement rates found for wound care and continence clinics.

Randomised controlled trials in rheumatology have demonstrated that nurse-led clinics are effective in controlling disease activity in people with rheumatoid arthritis. In addition, three studies have demonstrated cost effectiveness on this model of care in Denmark, the Netherlands and the UK.

Many nurse-led clinics have also been associated with enhanced patient satisfaction with care. A nurse-led clinic for intractable constipation in paediatric populations was compared to a paediatric gastroenterology clinic, illustrating that parent satisfaction was significantly higher for those who attended the nurse-led clinic. This has also been shown in rheumatology nurse-led clinics.

In areas where nursing practice may require additional support to maintain patient safety, some nurse-led clinics have implemented decision support tools, computerized systems and evidence-based algorithms to support their practice. Nurse-led clinics which utilize computerized decision support tools to manage oral anticoagulation dosages were found be to as effective as hospital-based clinics for INR control and stability.

In the UK, nurse-led care has been established in many chronic conditions such as diabetes, COPD and musculoskeletal disorders. Treatment guidelines in rheumatoid arthritis for example, specify the role of the nurse in managing the disease and coordinating care.

The evidence for the effectiveness of nurse-led intervention is growing and increasingly supported by randomised controlled trials and systematic reviews.

== See also ==
- Walk-in clinic

== Bibliography ==
1. Department of Health Nursing Division. A Strategy for Nursing: a report of the steering committee. London: HMSO; 1989.
2. NHS Management Executive. Junior Doctors: The New Deal. London: HMSO; 1991.
3. Department of Health. A Compendium of Solutions to Implementing the Working Time Directive for Doctors in Training from August 2004. London: Department of Health; 2004.
