= Western Community Hospital =

- Hampshire and Isle of Wight Healthcare NHS Foundation Trust
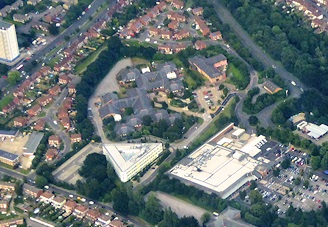
- Photograph showing the triangular shape of the Adelaide Health Centre (bottom) and the Western Community Hospital (above)

- Shown in Hampshire

Geography
- Location: Millbrook, Southampton, Hampshire, England, United Kingdom
- Coordinates: 50.9251°N 1.4463°W

Organisation
- Care system: Public NHS
- Type: Community

History
- Founded: 1874

Links
- Website: www.southernhealth.nhs.uk/locations/western-community-hospital/
- Lists: Hospitals in England

The Western Community Hospital is a health facility in William Macleod Way in the Shirley / Millbrook area of Southampton, Hampshire, England. It is managed by the Southern Health NHS Foundation Trust.

== History ==
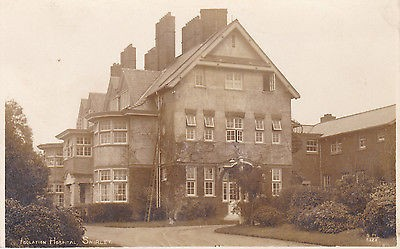
Shirley Isolation Hospital

The facility has its origins in two houses on West Quay in Southampton which were acquired to create an isolation hospital in 1874. Southampton Corporation acquired the passenger ship, City of Adelaide, and moored it just off Millbrook Point to provide further isolation facilities in 1893. At a meeting of the Local Board of Health later that year, concern was expressed about the ship being anchored off the point where children played on the beach.

These makeshift premises were replaced by a purpose-built facility on Mousehole Lane (now Oakley Road) in Shirley which opened as the Shirley Isolation Hospital in 1900. This facility joined the National Health Service as the Southampton Chest Hospital and, after the need to treat patients with respiratory problems receded, the facility evolved during the 1960s to become the Southampton Western Hospital.

After the Southampton Western Hospital closed in 1985, a new facility for elderly people was created on the site in January 1996. This facility evolved to become the Western Community Hospital. Additionally, a primary health centre was procured under a Private Finance Initiative contract: this building, which was built by Geoffrey Osborne Ltd at a cost £16 million immediately to the south west of the community hospital, opened as the Adelaide Health Centre (named after the old isolation ship) in January 2010.
