= Solent NHS Trust =

- Type: NHS trust
- Established: 1 April 2011
- Disbanded: 1 October 2024
- Website: www.solent.nhs.uk

Solent NHS Trust was an NHS trust which ran mental health and community services and community hospitals in Southampton and Portsmouth, England. Its sites included Western Community Hospital, Royal South Hants Hospital, St James Hospital, St Mary’s Hospital.

In December 2013 it was announced that the Trust would be among the first to trial the Care Quality Commission’s planned approach to inspecting mental health services because Monitor and the NHS Trust Development Authority wanted assurance on the quality of the services they provide before progressing their Foundation Trust applications.

The trust runs the Adelaide Health Centre in Southampton which cost £16m to build but in 2014 was half empty as local GPs refused to move into it. The building was commissioned by the now defunct Southampton City Primary Care Trust, and the Trust leases the space for £1.5m per annum on a 25-year contract.

In February 2014 Dr Ros Tolcher announced she would be leaving her post at the Trust to take up a new role as chief executive at Harrogate and District NHS Foundation Trust. Sue Harriman, who trained as a nurse in the Royal Navy, replaced her as chief executive.

In 2015, the trust proposed to sue Hampshire County Council for loss of profits after it awarded a £41.3m contract for adult substance misuse services which they previously provided to Inclusion Drug Services, part of South Staffordshire and Shropshire Healthcare NHS Foundation Trust.

The trust was named by the Health Service Journal as one of the top hundred NHS trusts to work for in 2015. At that time it had 3,149 full-time equivalent staff and a sickness absence rate of 4.66%. 70% of staff recommend it as a place for treatment and 52% recommended it as a place to work.

The trust abandoned its bid for foundation trust status in December 2015.

Harriman was seconded to the national COVID-19 vaccination programme between October 2020 and March 2021. She took up a new role at Bath, Swindon and Wiltshire in the summer of 2022 and was replaced by Andrew Strevens, who had held positions in the trust since 2015.
