= Lymington Hospital =

- Hampshire Primary Care Trust
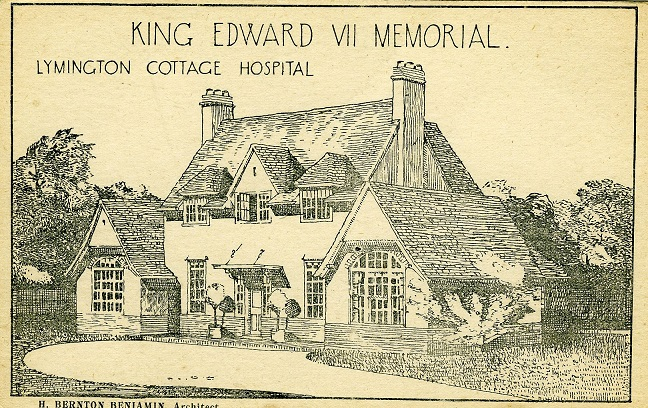
- King Edward VII Hospital

- Location in Hampshire

Geography
- Location: Lymington, Hampshire, England, United Kingdom
- Coordinates: 50.7609°N 1.5516°W

Organisation
- Type: Community

History
- Founded: 1913
- Closed: 2007

Links
- Lists: Hospitals in England

Lymington Hospital was a consultant-led community hospital in Lymington, Hampshire. It was administered by New Forest Primary Care Trust before it was replaced by the Hampshire Primary Care Trust.

== History ==
The fundraising for the new hospital was led by Lord Arthur Cecil, one of the younger sons of 2nd Marquess of Salisbury. It was designed by Horace Bernton-Benjamin, a local architect, and included two four-bedded wards and one emergency ward. It was opened as the King Edward VII Memorial Hospital in 1913.

It installed X-ray equipment at an early stage, before joining the National Health Service as Lymington Hospital in 1948. After services were transferred to Lymington New Forest Hospital in 2007, the site was redeveloped for housing.
