= Royal Hampshire County Hospital =

- Hampshire Hospitals NHS Foundation Trust
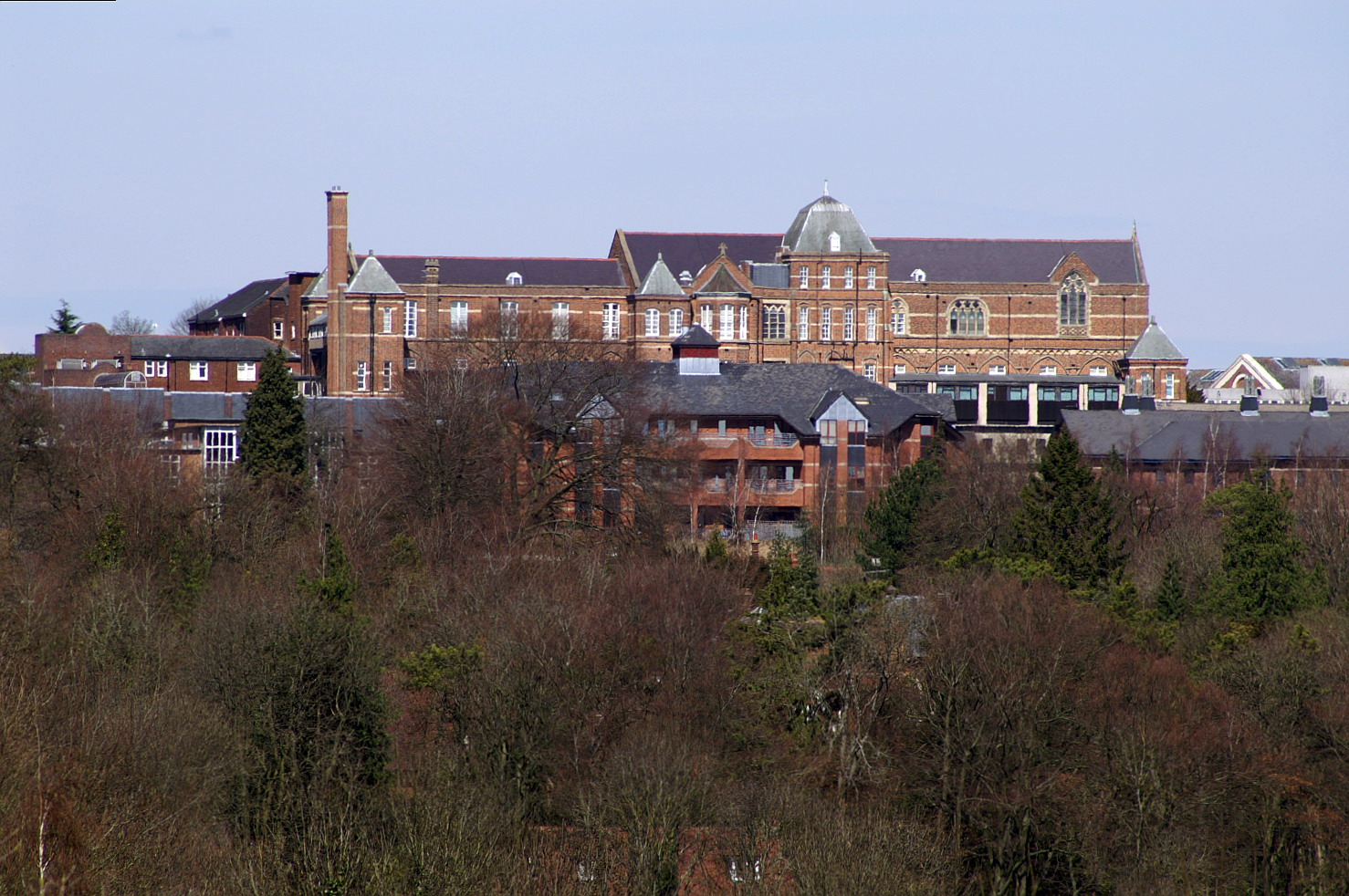
- Royal Hampshire County Hospital

- Shown in Hampshire

Geography
- Location: Winchester, Hampshire, England, United Kingdom
- Coordinates: 51.062°N 1.330°W

Organisation
- Care system: Public NHS
- Type: District General
- Affiliated university: University of Southampton

Services
- Emergency department: Yes Accident & Emergency
- Beds: 806 (Trustwide, Quarter 3, 2018)

History
- Founded: 1736

Links
- Website: www.hampshirehospitals.nhs.uk
- Lists: Hospitals in England

The Royal Hampshire County Hospital in Winchester is a District General Hospital serving much of central Hampshire. It is owned and run by the Hampshire Hospitals NHS Foundation Trust. It is commonly abbreviated to RHCH, or alternatively, Winchester Hospital as it is the only open NHS hospital in Winchester.^{α}

== History ==
The Hampshire County Hospital was founded in Winchester in 1736 and initially was based in Colebrook Street before moving to a site in Parchment Street in 1759. Due to drainage issues, a site on higher ground was sought and the hospital moved to its present site on Romsey Road. Florence Nightingale advised on the construction on this new site and the architect William Butterfield designed the new hospital, which opened in 1868 with sixteen in-patients and fourteen out-patients. Queen Victoria awarded the hospital its "Royal" prefix.

Later additions to the site include the old Outpatients Department in 1927, Florence Portal House (Gynaecology and Maternity) in 1974, Nightingale Wing in 1986, Brinton Wing in 1992, and the new treatment and diagnostic centre (Burrell Wing) in 2006. The education centre and library was also rebuilt in 2006.

At about 4pm on 9 December 2011, a fire broke out in the MRI Scanner Room; destroying the MRI Scanner and one of two CT Scanners, as well as the control room for all the scanners. The A&E Department next door survived, but was closed overnight, opening only for minor injuries the following night for several days until CT Scanning facilities were made available.

In January 2012, the Basingstoke and North Hants Hospitals NHS Foundation Trust merged with the Winchester and Eastleigh NHS Trust; forming a combined organisation henceforward called Hampshire Hospitals NHS Foundation Trust.

In September 2021, the Winchester Hospice opened on the site with 10 inpatient beds. In March 2023, a new surgical admissions unit was opened at the hospital.

== Notes ==
^α as opposed to the nearby St Paul's Hospital (a former elderly rehabilitation unit which closed in January 1998)

== See also ==
- List of hospitals in England
