= Lymington New Forest Hospital =

- Hampshire and Isle of Wight Healthcare NHS Foundation Trust
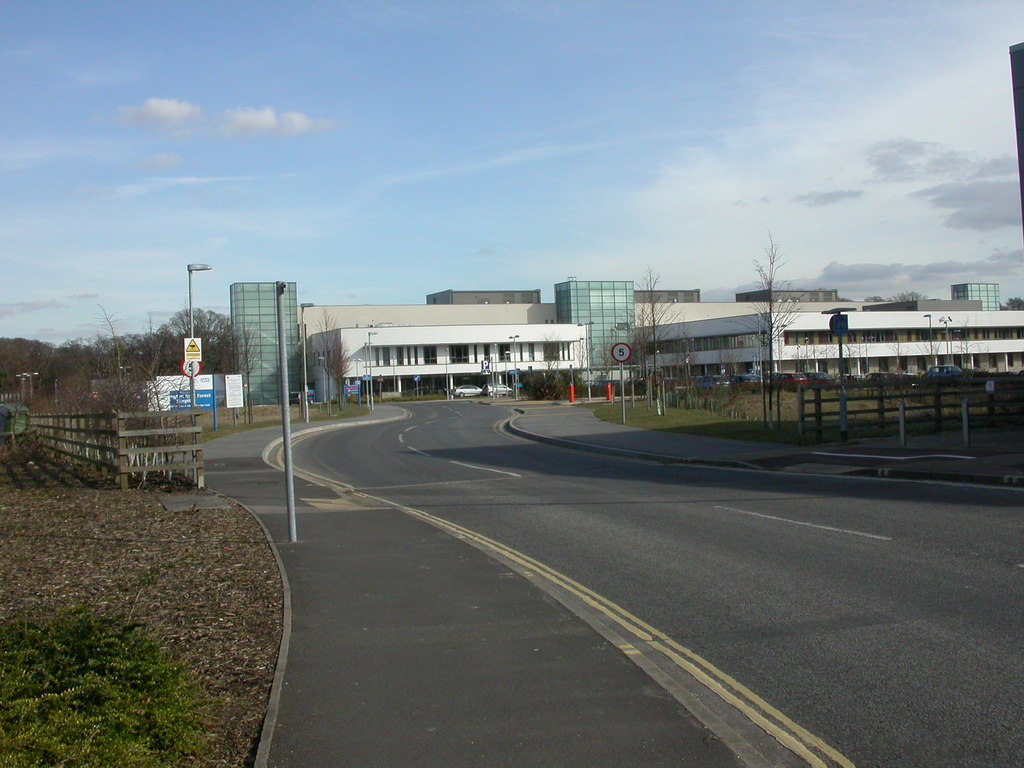

- Location in Hampshire

Geography
- Location: Lymington, Hampshire, England
- Coordinates: 50.7692°N 1.5457°W

Organisation
- Care system: National Health Service
- Type: Community

History
- Founded: 6 February 2007

Links
- Website: hiowhealthcare.nhs.uk/our-services/our-main-sites-and-locations/lymington-new-forest-hospital

Lymington New Forest Hospital is a community hospital in Lymington, Hampshire, run by the Hampshire and Isle of Wight Healthcare NHS Foundation Trust.

== History ==
The hospital was procured under a Private Finance Initiative contract to replace the old Lymington Hospital in 2004. It was designed by Murphy Philipps Architects and constructed by Ryhurst at a cost of £36 million. The hospital was opened on 6 February 2007 by Princess Anne.

The hospital houses a diagnostic treatment centre, several specialist outpatient clinics, two operating theatres, two endoscopy suites, medical and surgical day units, a medical unit including stroke rehabilitation and a surgical ward. The radiology department has three radiology rooms, a 1.5T MRI scanner, a 64-slice CT scanner, a DEXA scanner and two ultra sound suites. The hospital also has a fluoroscopy unit, which opened in January 2014.

== See also ==
- List of hospitals in England
