= Southern Health NHS Foundation Trust =

NHS foundation trust based in Southampton, England

- Type: NHS foundation trust
- Established: 1 April 2011
- Disbanded: 1 October 2024 into Hampshire and Isle of Wight Healthcare NHS Foundation Trust
- Headquarters: Calmore; Southampton; SO40 2RZ
- Hospitals: Fareham Community Hospital; Gosport War Memorial Hospital; Lymington New Forest Hospital; Petersfield Hospital; Romsey Community Hospital; Western Community Hospital
- Staff: 5,359 (2018/19)
- Website: www.southernhealth.nhs.uk

Southern Health NHS Foundation Trust is a former NHS foundation trust which provided community health, mental health and learning disability services across Hampshire. It was one of the largest providers of such services in England. On 1 October 2024, the trust combined with Solent NHS Trust and Isle of Wight NHS Trust to form one large Hampshire and Isle of Wight Healthcare NHS Foundation Trust.

== History ==
The trust was formed on 1 April 2011 following the merger of Hampshire Community Healthcare NHS Trust and Hampshire Partnership NHS Foundation Trust.

== Operations ==
The trust runs Eastrop House and Parklands Hospital in Basingstoke, Hollybank and Elmleigh in Havant, Postern House in Marlborough, Melbury Lodge and Leigh House in Winchester, Crowlin House and Forest Lodge, Woodhaven, Western Community Hospital, Antelope House and Moorgreen Hospital in Southampton, Fareham Community Hospital and Ravenswood House in Fareham, Jacobs Lodge in Hounsdown, as well as Chase Community Hospital, Alton Community Hospital, Fordingbridge Hospital, Romsey Hospital, Petersfield Hospital and Gosport War Memorial Hospital.

The Trust is one of eight in a partnership of NHS mental health trusts to provide acute mental health inpatient services for military personnel. The Trust retained the contract to provide mental health beds for military personnel in the South of England.

In July 2016 it was announced that the trust would transfer community learning disability services in Oxfordshire to Oxford Health NHS Foundation Trust as part of a plan to reduce the area served and the disparate services provided.

It took over five General practices in Gosport in 2016. The practices merged to form The Willow Group, which holds a general medical services contract jointly with the Trust.

== Performance ==
The Trust's Going Viral programme won the Leadership Innovation category at the first Guardian Healthcare Innovation Awards in November 2013.

In November 2013 the Care Quality Commission issued an enforcement notice to the trust after inspection of the Headington site found it to be in breach of six essential standards. Slade House was found to be unsafe for patients.

The trust was named by the Health Service Journal as one of the top hundred NHS trusts to work for in 2015. At that time it had 6662 full time equivalent staff and a sickness absence rate of 4.95%. 64% of staff recommend it as a place for treatment and 53% recommended it as a place to work.

Oxfordshire County Council’s adult social care director and local Clinical commissioning groups decided that the trust’s contract to run specialist inpatient services and community teams in Oxfordshire should not be renewed when it expired on 31 December 2015 after regulators and commissioners had raised "quality and performance concerns" about inpatient services. The Care Quality Commission rated the trust's learning disability inpatient services as ‘requiring improvement’ in March 2015 though community learning disability services were rated as ‘good’.

It is one of the Multispecialty community providers established under the Five Year Forward View and is setting up a contract with a GP practice whereby 10 practice employees - the non-clinical staff, the salaried GPs and two out of the four partners - will become trust employees. The two remaining doctors will continue to own the practice, which will be the joint owner, with the trust, of a company which will hold the General Medical Services Contract.

It achieved an operating surplus of £0.2 million for 2017/18 but a deficit of £8.8 million after non-operating costs (financing costs and gain on asset sales) were taken in to account.

A report by Mazars for NHS England looked at all 10,306 deaths at the trust between April 2011 and March 2015. According to a draft version of the report leaked to the BBC, 1,454 of these deaths were unexpected, and only 195 were treated as a serious incident requiring investigation. The reports were criticised for being late and of poor quality. Very few deaths of people with learning disability or dementia were investigated and there was little family involvement. Southern Health accepts that its investigations needed to improve, but disputes the report's interpretation of the data. The trust maintains that it is not an outlier in respect of any mortality indicators and that it investigated the deaths which were its responsibility. 143 deaths were suicide or suspected suicide - comparable with other similar trusts. The vast majority of deaths were of patients for whose care the trust was not primarily responsible.

Trust chairman Mike Petter and Mark Aspinall one of the public governors resigned in April 2016 shortly before the trust was condemned by the Care Quality Commission for "continuing to put patients at risk" and failing to put in place "robust governance" to investigate incidents, including deaths, and to respond to concerns raised by patients, their carers and staff. Aspinall said the Council of Governors ought to regard itself, as part of the leadership of the Trust, equally culpable. John Green another public governor resigned in July 2016 citing the board's "farcical" response to last year's Mazars report

In 2016 the Trust was subject to a number of Enforcement Undertakings required by Monitor, the last being issued on 30 June 2016.

The learning disability services in Oxfordshire were transferred to Oxford Health NHS Foundation Trust. Some specialist learning disability services are to be transferred to Hertfordshire Partnership University NHS Foundation Trust.

Katrina Percy, the chief executive, resigned in 2016. In March 2017 all four non-executive directors resigned.

After the deaths of Connor Sparrowhawk and Teresa Colvin the trust was fined £2 million for "serious systematic" management failings in proceedings under the Health and Safety at Work etc. Act 1974.

534 patients were injured in 2016-17 through use of restraints on psychiatric patients in Southern Health NHS Foundation Trust. This was the largest number in England. Critics say restraints are potentially traumatic, and even life-threatening, for patients.

== See also ==
- List of NHS trusts
