= Southlands Hospital =

- University Hospitals Sussex NHS Foundation Trust
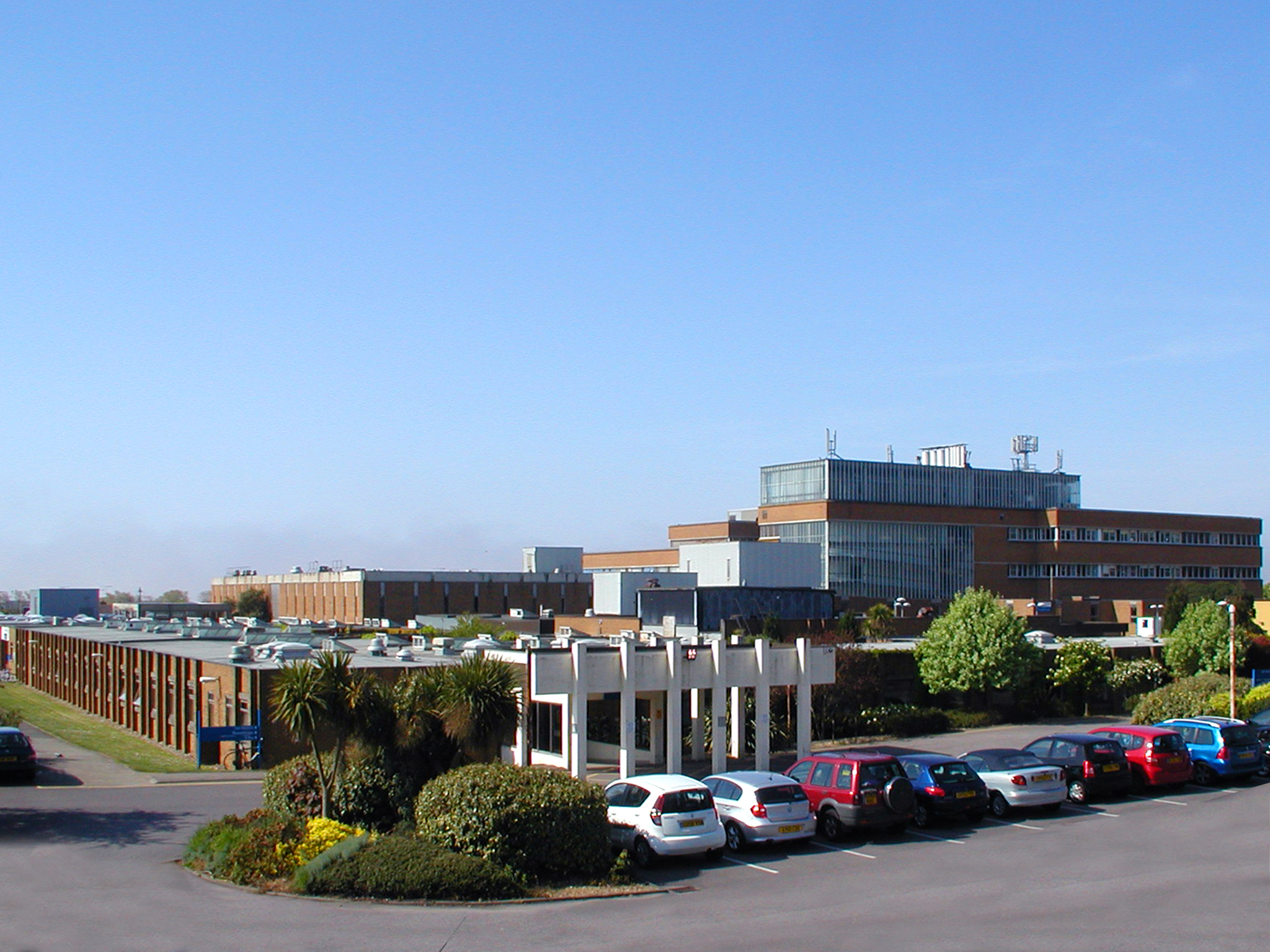
- Southlands Hospital

- Shown in West Sussex

Geography
- Location: Shoreham-by-Sea, West Sussex, England
- Coordinates: 50.841°N 0.257°W

Organisation
- Care system: National Health Service

History
- Founded: 1835

Links
- Website: www.uhsussex.nhs.uk/hospitals/southlands-hospital/

Southlands Hospital is a medical facility based in Shoreham-by-Sea, West Sussex, England, which serves people living in Shoreham itself as well as Worthing and other towns and villages along the south coast and in the inland areas of West Sussex. It is managed by the University Hospitals Sussex NHS Foundation Trust.

== History ==
The hospital has its origins in an infirmary which was built for the Steyning Poor Law Union Workhouse and which opened in 1835. After the workhouse moved to new premises at Upper Shoreham Road in 1901, the infirmary moved to the new site as well in 1906. The infirmary's medical staff, who became known as the "Southlands Guardians", looked after many wounded patients during the First World War.

The infirmary became known as the Steyning Institution in 1930 and then became known as the Southlands Hospital in 1933. Many of its beds were given over to the care of injured soldiers during the Second World War. The hospital joined the National Health Service in 1948. Staff at the hospital assisted in a major incident when a double-decker bus was blown off the Old Shoreham Bridge into the River Adur on 1 January 1949. The main ward block was opened in 1979.

After maternity services were transferred to Worthing Hospital, the maternity ward closed on 7 June 1997. The transfer of other in-patient services to other hospitals allowed the old Harness Block to be demolished and the surplus land handed over for residential development in 2016.

In 2018 a new eye care unit costing £7.5 million was officially opened by the then-Countess of Wessex.

The hospital became part of University Hospitals Sussex NHS Foundation Trust on 1 April 2021 as a result of the merger of Western Sussex Hospitals NHS Foundation Trust and Brighton and Sussex University Hospitals NHS Trust.

== See also ==
- Healthcare in Sussex
- List of hospitals in England
