= RSCH =

RSCH may refer to:

- Royal Surrey County Hospital in Guildford, England
- Royal Sussex County Hospital in Brighton, England
