= Seaside Hospital Radio =

Coordinates: 50.840959°N 0.256295°W

England
- Broadcast area: Worthing Hospital and Southlands Hospital
- Frequencies: Hospicom Bedside System, hospital wifi and online webcast stream

History
- First air date: 1972

Links
- Website: http://www.seasidehr.com

Seaside Hospital Radio (known until 2004 as Radio Southlands) is a Hospital Radio service broadcasting to both Worthing and Southlands Hospitals in West Sussex, England from a studio site in Shoreham by Sea. The hospitals are considered to be one working hospital, however healthcare services operate between the two.

The station is a member of the Hospital Broadcasting Association and is also a registered charity in the UK, number 297515.

The station is run entirely by volunteers, who fundraise and present programmes, along with maintaining our studio suite at Southlands Hospital.

== Achievement ==
At 11:00 a.m. on Saturday 25 August 2007 until 10:00 p.m. on Sunday 26 August, Stuart Penfold presented a non-stop radio broadcast to raise money for charity.

The station was recognised in 2008 with the Bronze award at the National Hospital Broadcasting Awards, in the best Station Promotion or Identification category. The promo was voiced by Jo Jensen and produced by Adam James.

The station launched a 24-hour broadcast service in December 2009, with the installation of a computer automated playout system which allows the listeners to tune in and hear Seaside Hospital Radio anytime of the day or night, with presented programmes around the clock including news, interviews, chat and great music.

The station celebrated its 40th anniversary in 2012, holding several special events to mark the occasion including a Musical Night on 26 May at Heene Gallery in Worthing, featuring local folk and acoustic bands, and the organisation's own guitarist Ray Blunt also played a set on stage.

The organisation held a celebratory evening of dinner and dance in September 2012 to officially mark (almost to the exact day) the station's first broadcast back in 1972.

The station celebrated once again in September 2017 for its 45th anniversary, and as of September 2022 has reached the golden age of 50.

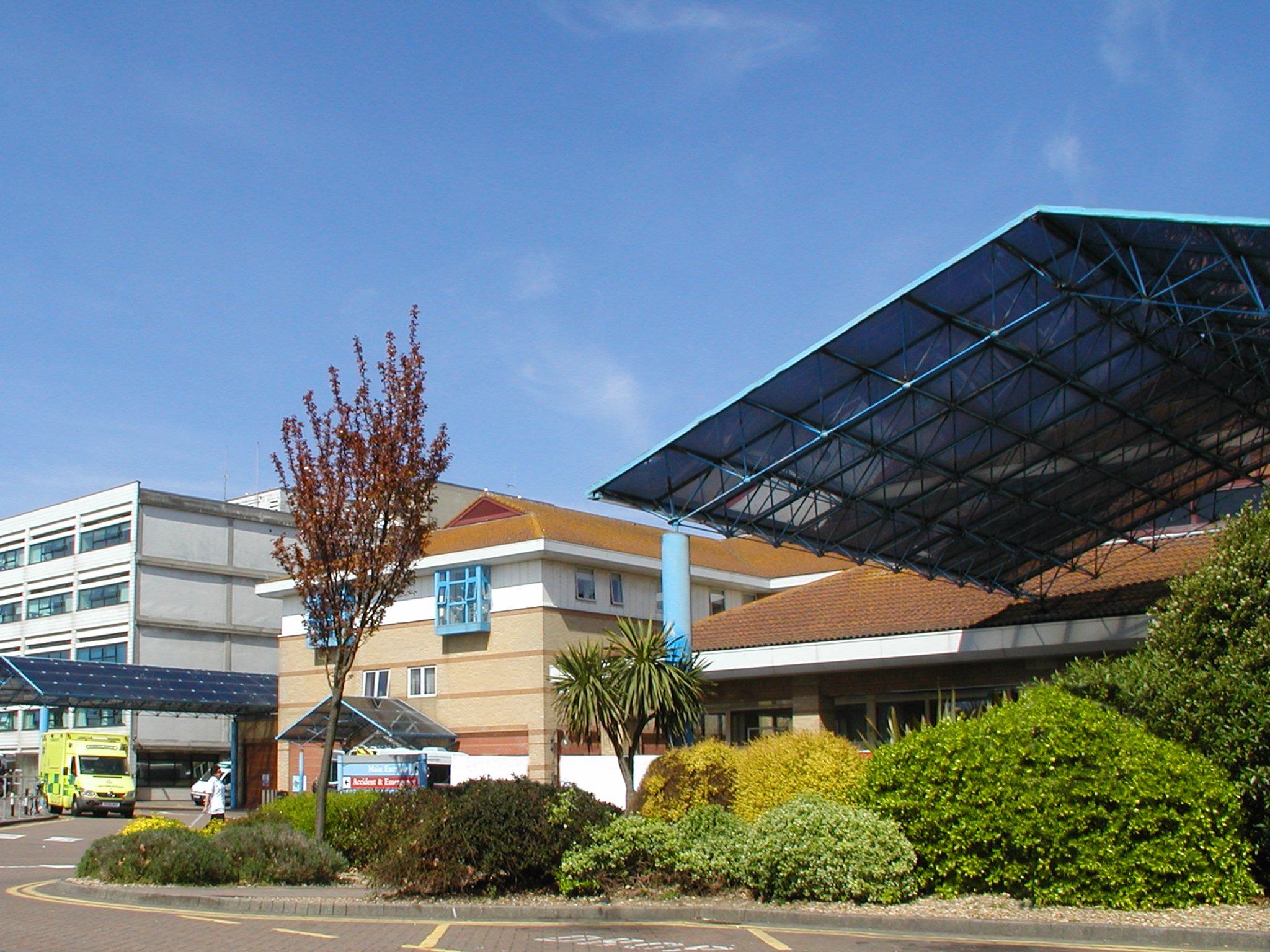
This station broadcasts to Worthing Hospital ...

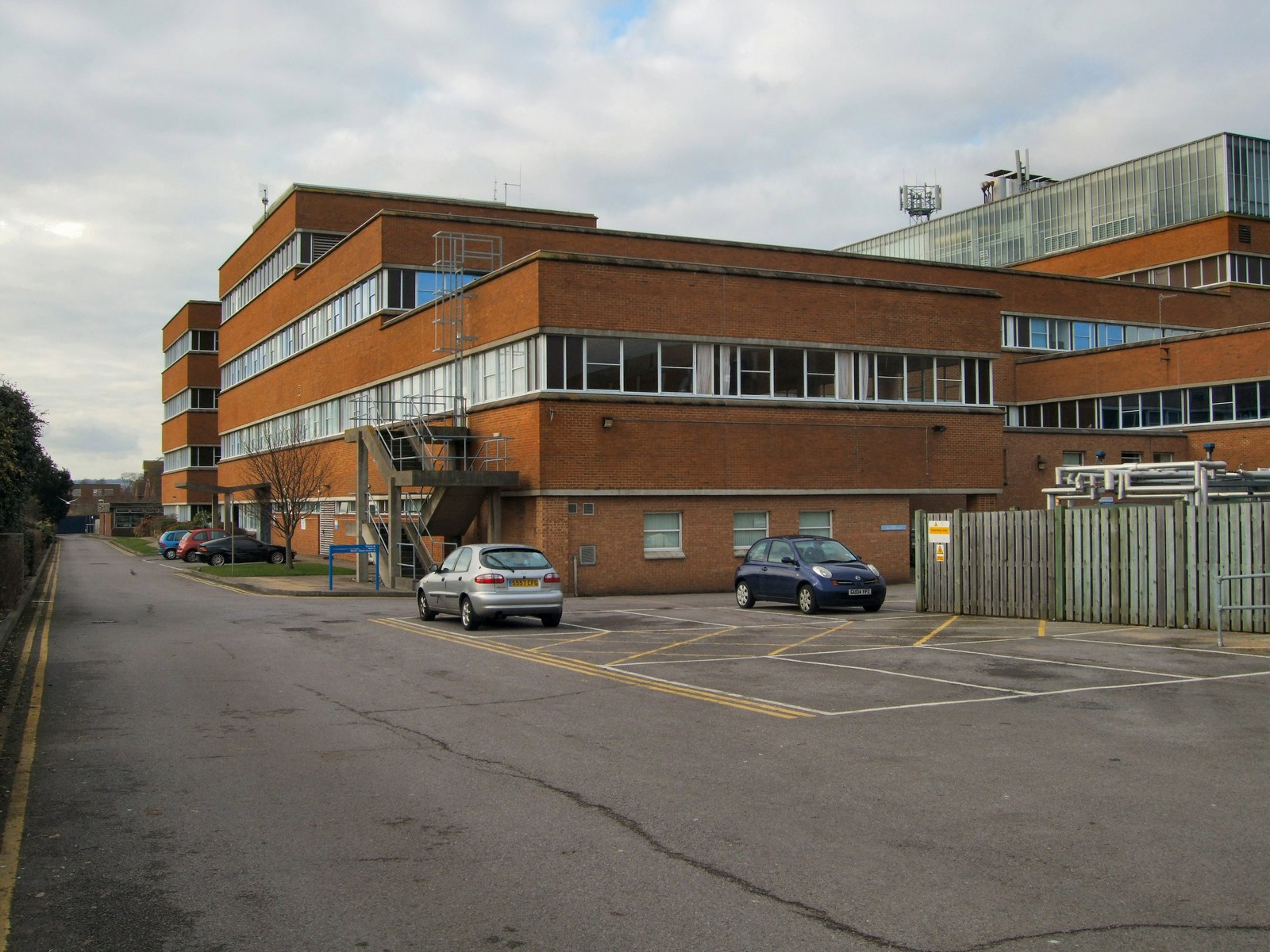
... and Southlands Hospital.

== Current Project ==
The station's current project is to raise a substantial sum of money in order to equip it for the digital age and a studio refurbishment in the near future which will dramatically improve the quality of output and production.
