= Western Sussex Hospitals NHS Foundation Trust =

NHS hospital trust

- Type: NHS foundation trust
- Established: 1 April 2009
- Disbanded: 1 April 2021
- Hospitals: Southlands Hospital; St Richard's Hospital; Worthing Hospital
- Chief executive: Marianne Griffiths
- Staff: 6,636 (2019/20)
- Website: www.westernsussexhospitals.nhs.uk

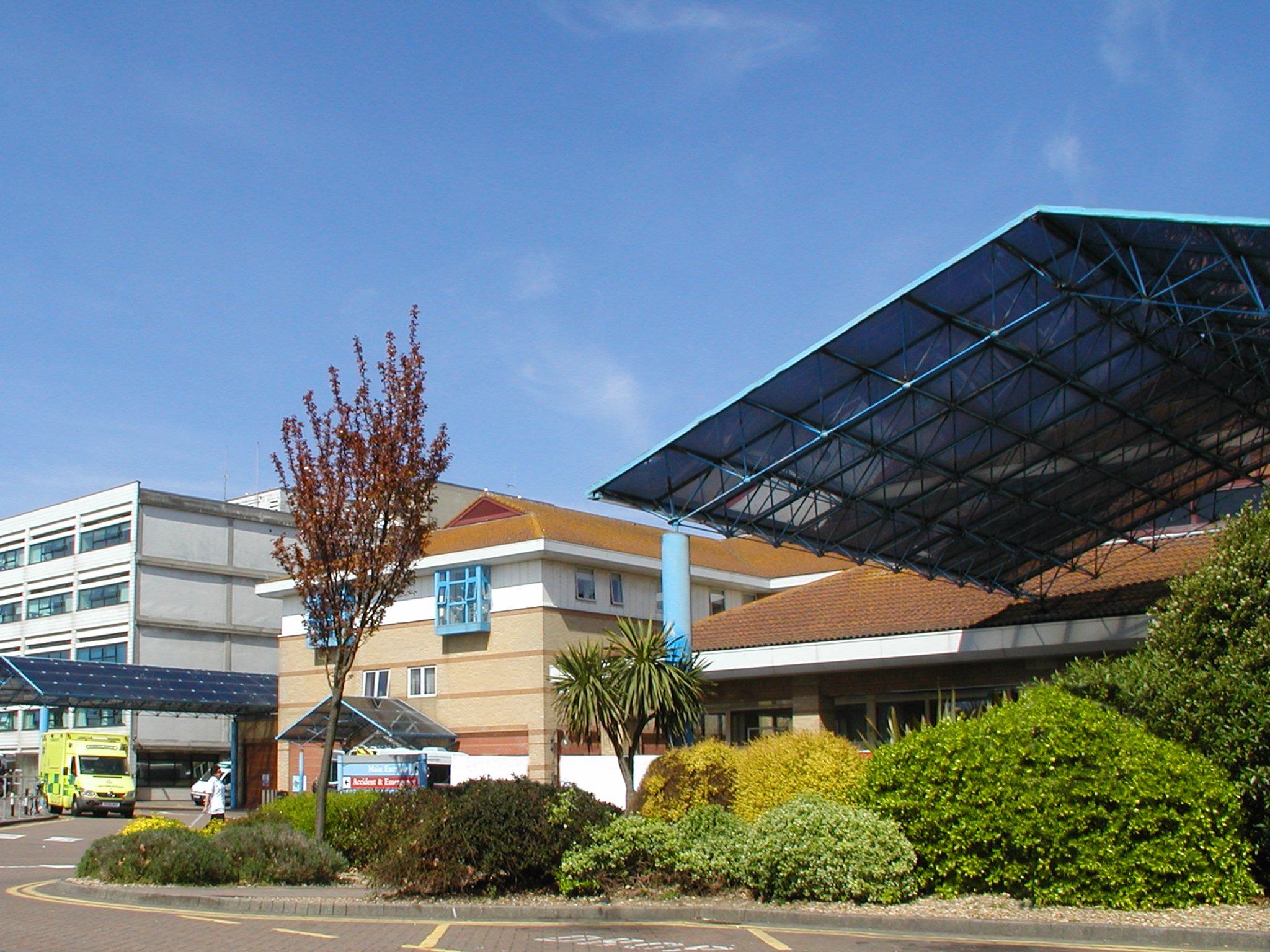
Worthing Hospital

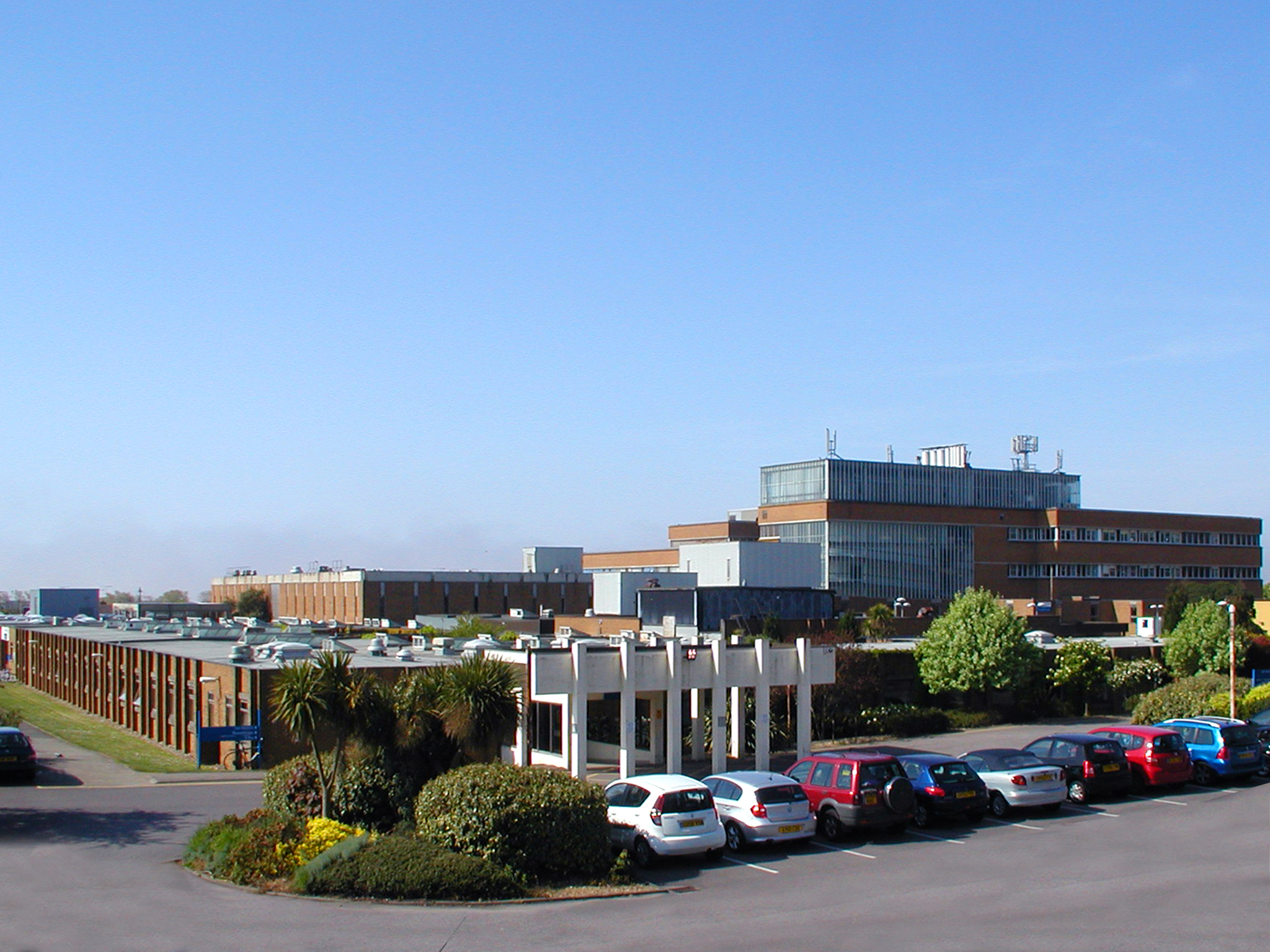
Southlands Hospital

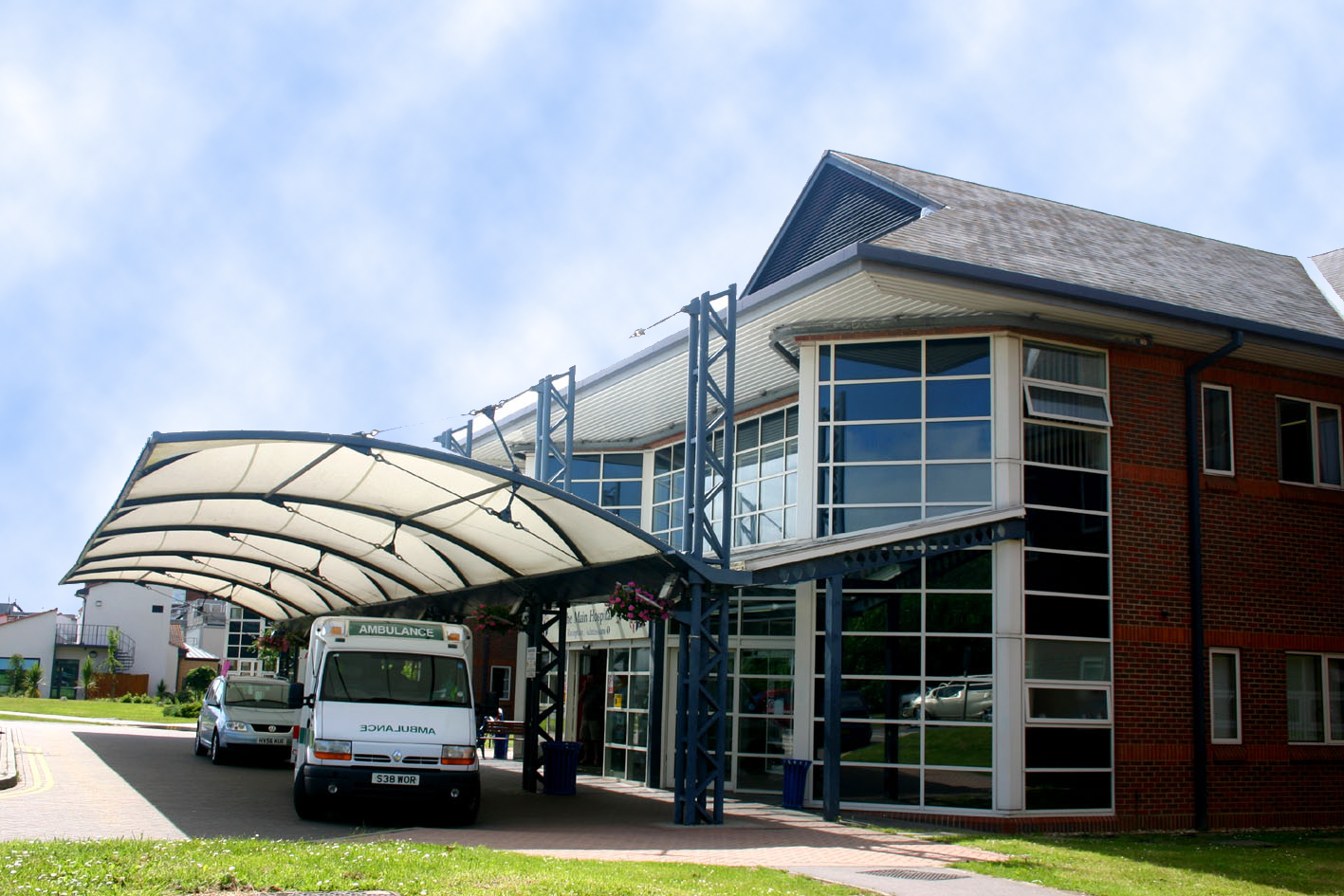
St Richard's Hospital

Western Sussex Hospitals NHS Foundation Trust was an NHS foundation trust which ran Worthing Hospital, Southlands Hospital in Shoreham-by-Sea and St Richard's Hospital in Chichester, West Sussex, England and served a population of around 450,000 people across a catchment area covering most of West Sussex. It was formed through a merger in 2009 and started with a substantial inherited deficit, mortality issues and poor performance. It merged into University Hospitals Sussex NHS Foundation Trust in 2021.

In April 2014 the maternity unit at Worthing and St Richard's was awarded the "level three" award by the Clinical Negligence Scheme for Trusts (CNST).

Stroke services are provided at both sites. NHS England want to see them centralised on one site.

== History ==
The trust was established on 1 April 2009 following the dissolution and merger of the Royal West Sussex NHS Trust and the Worthing and Southlands Hospitals NHS Trust.

In July 2020 it announced plans to merge with Brighton and Sussex University Hospitals NHS Trust. On 1 April 2021, the merger of the two NHS Trusts led to the creation of University Hospitals Sussex NHS Foundation Trust.

== Performance ==
In 2016 Western Sussex Hospitals NHS Foundation Trust (WSHFT) was rated as 'Outstanding' by the Care Quality Commission (CQC). At the time it was one of only three acute trusts in the country to receive the health watchdog’s highest rating by the Care Quality Commission.

Marianne Griffiths, the chief executive, was named chief executive of the year at the Health Service Journal awards in November 2016, and the top chief executive 2018. and again in 2019. She adopted the Japanese Kaizen continuous improvement system and went on to manage the merged University Hospitals Sussex NHS Foundation Trust.

In 2019 Marianne Griffiths was made Dame Commander of the Order of the British Empire

In 2019 Western Sussex Hospitals was the first non-specialist acute trust in the country to be rated ‘Outstanding’ in all the six key inspection areas assessed by the Care Quality Commission (CQC).

== See also ==
- Healthcare in Sussex
- List of NHS trusts
