= Lewes Victoria Hospital =

- Brighton and Sussex University Hospitals NHS Trust
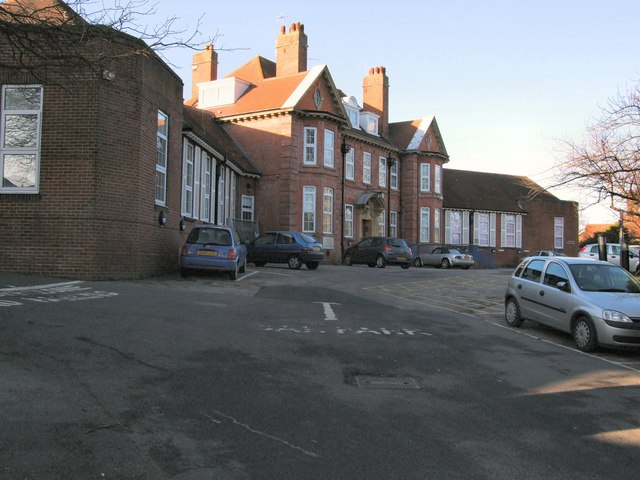
- Lewes Victoria Hospital

- Shown in East Sussex

Geography
- Location: Nevill Road, Lewes, East Sussex, England, United Kingdom
- Coordinates: 50.8750°N 0.0054°W

Organisation
- Care system: Public NHS
- Type: Community

Services
- Emergency department: No Accident & Emergency

History
- Founded: 1909

Links
- Website: www.bsuh.nhs.uk
- Lists: Hospitals in England

Lewes Victoria Hospital is a health facility at Nevill Road in Lewes, East Sussex, England. It is managed by NHS Property Services with services operated principally by Sussex Community NHS Foundation Trust, Sussex Partnership NHS Foundation Trust, University Hospitals Sussex NHS Foundation Trust, East Sussex Healthcare NHS Trust, and with parts of community medical cover provided by general practitioners from Foundry Healthcare Lewes, the local primary care network.

== History ==
The facility has its origins in the Lewes Dispensary which was established in the High Street in 1847. It moved to larger premises at School Hill where it opened as the Lewes Dispensary and Infirmary in 1855. It moved again to its current building, which was designed by Ernest Runtz and George Ford in the Queen Anne style, and which opened as the Victoria Hospital and Infirmary in 1909. It joined the National Health Service as the Victoria Hospital in 1948. In July 2018 the trust announced plans for an urgent treatment centre at the hospital.
