= Public services in Worthing =

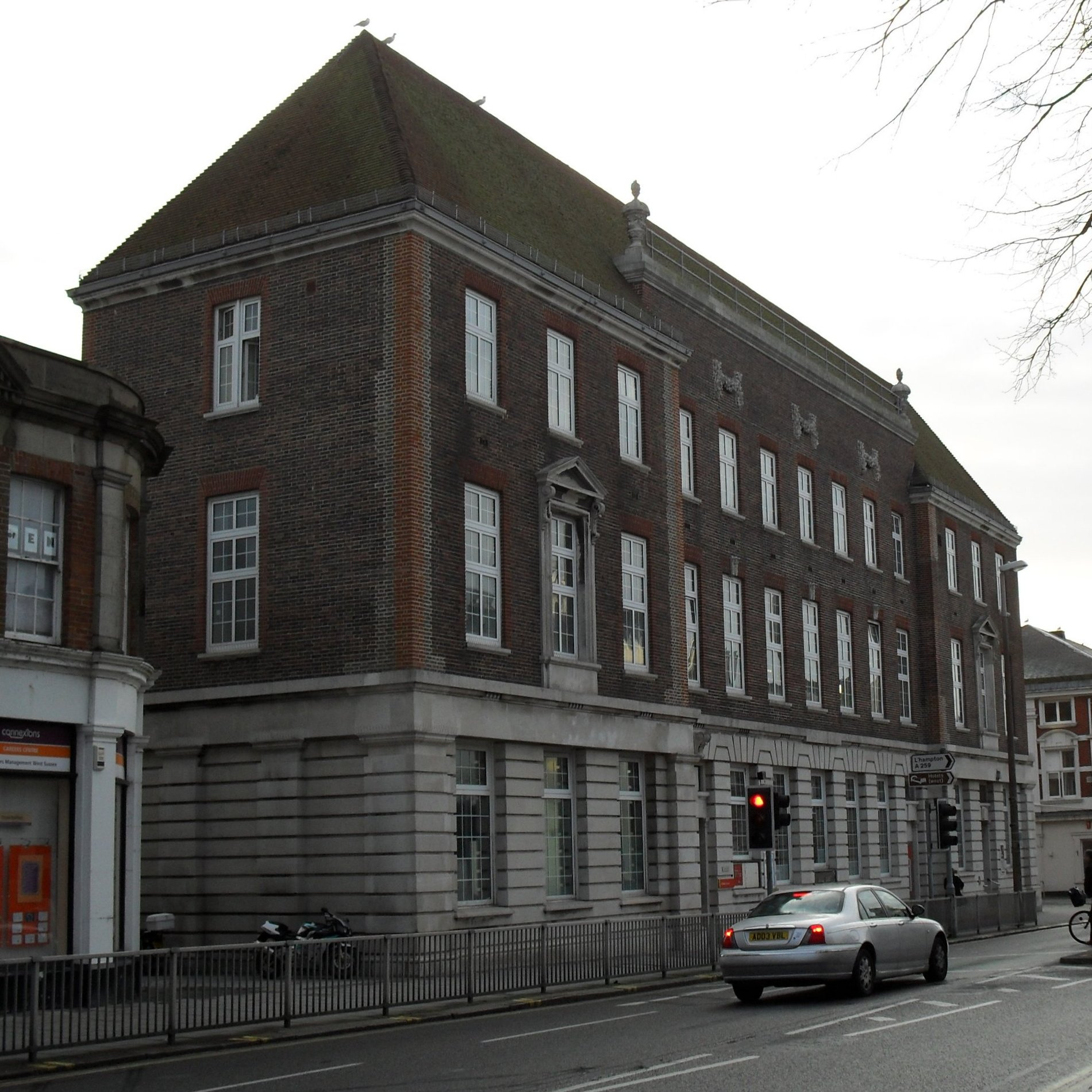
Worthing's Neo-Georgian post office was built by D.N. Dyke in 1930.

Worthing, a seaside town in the English county of West Sussex which has had borough status since 1890, has a wide range of public services funded by national government, West Sussex County Council, Worthing Borough Council and other public-sector bodies. Revenue to fund these services comes principally from Council Tax.

== Police and courts ==
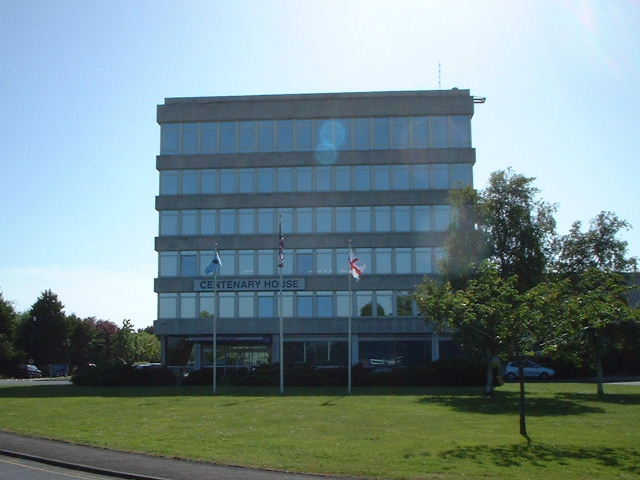
Centenary House is the headquarters of the West Downs division of Sussex Police.

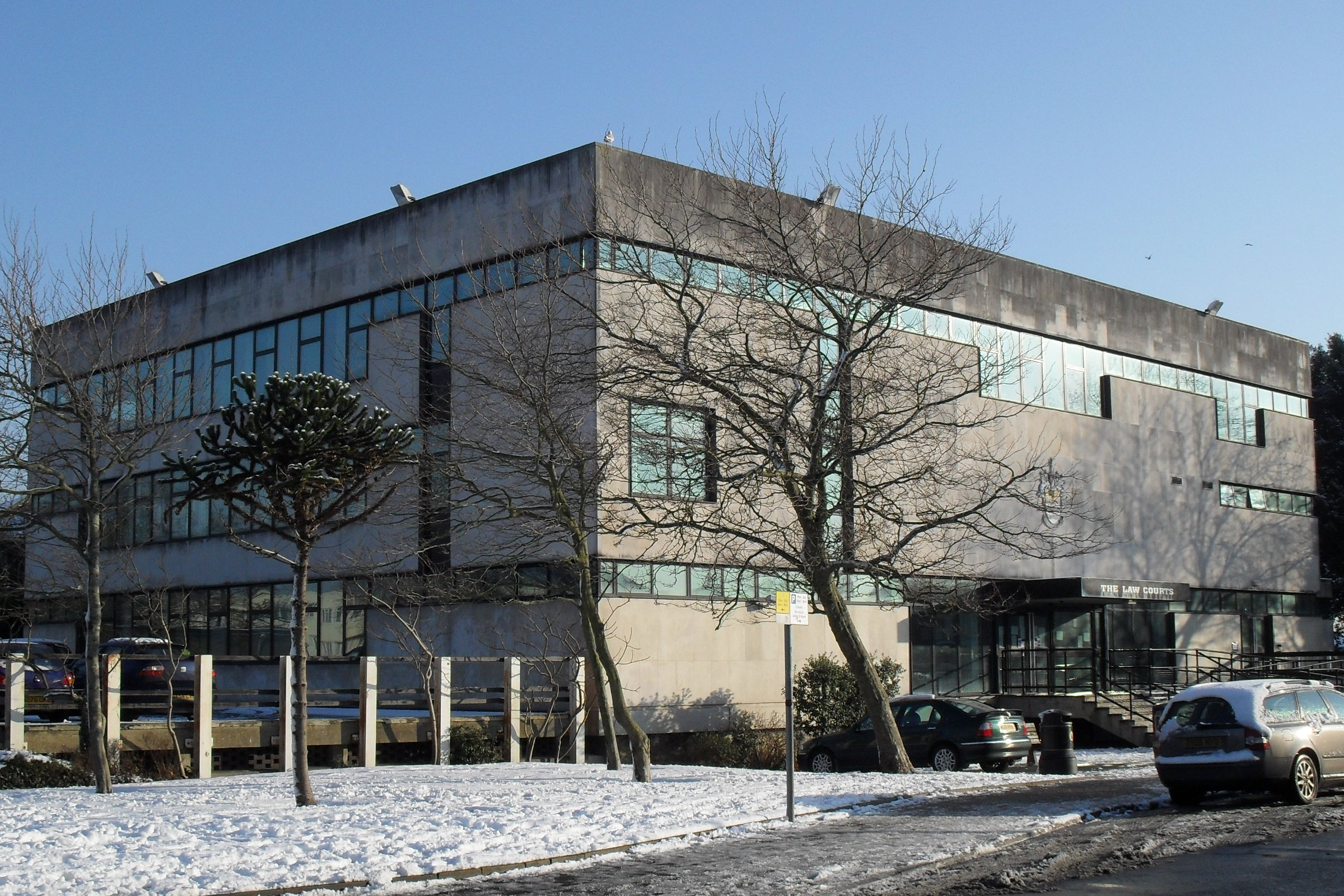
Worthing Law Courts were built in 1967.

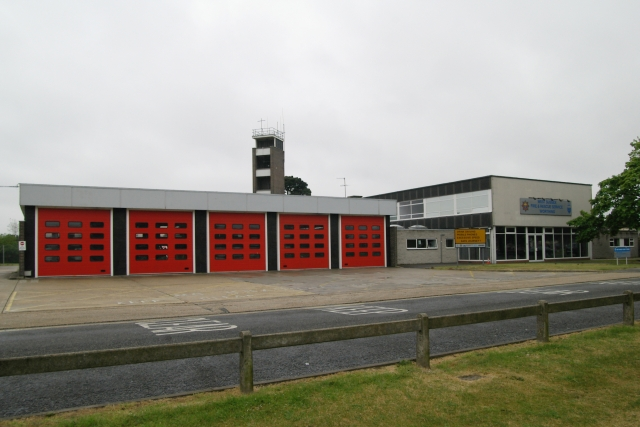
Worthing fire station was built in 1962.

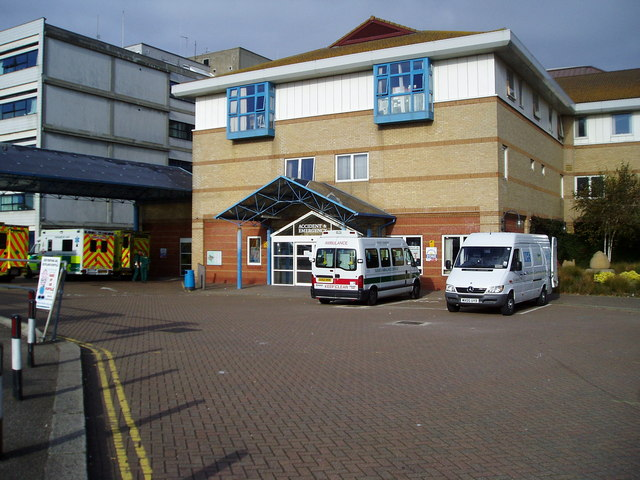
The Lyndhurst Road site of Worthing Hospital dates back to 1881.

Home Office policing in Worthing is provided by the Worthing district of the West Downs division of Sussex Police. The district is divided into three neighbourhood policing teams—Town, East and West—for operational purposes. The police station is now in Chatsworth Road, but several town-centre sites have been occupied in the past. The first station was at 7 Ann Street; it moved to number 17 and then, in 1922, to 16 High Street. A new building was provided in Union Place in 1939. After the move to Chatsworth Road, C.G. Stillman's brick structure fell into disuse, and in April 2009 permission was given to demolish it; this happened in October 2009.

When the town was incorporated, a combination of beadles, coastguard officers and headboroughs kept order. By the 1840s, a five-strong police force led by a Superintendent was in place; this became part of the newly formed West Sussex Police Force in 1857. The first police station, at 7 Ann Street, opened the following year. There is also a 19-cell custody suite at Centenary House in Durrington, which is the headquarters of the West Downs division. As of the third quarter of 2009, Worthing's three-month moving average crime rate was 7.3 crimes per 1000 people; this was similar to the rest of Sussex but higher than the equivalent quarter in 2008.

A magistrates' court was established at the old town hall in 1835. Twelve years later, county court status was granted. When the new town hall was built in the 1930s, the arrangement continued, but a new courtroom was provided at the police station in 1940. The present Law Courts building on Christchurch Road dates from 1967 and was designed by a team including Frank Morris.

== Fire protection ==
Worthing's first fire engine was bought for the town by a resident in 1815. A 29-man volunteer fire brigade was formed in 1855; by 1869 it operated three fire stations. The borough organised its own fire brigade in 1891. A new fire station was built on High Street in 1908; it closed in 1961, and the present building on Ardsheal Road in Broadwater was provided in 1962. Services are now provided by the Worthing and Adur District Team, part of the West Sussex Fire and Rescue Service, which employs 60 full-time and 18 retained firefighters at the Worthing station.

== Hospitals ==
The town's first hospital was built in 1829 on Ann Street. A larger building opened in 1846 on Chapel Road, and was given the name "Worthing Infirmary and Dispensary" after an enlargement in 1860. In 1881, the first part of what would become Worthing Hospital was opened: an 18-bed facility was built on a former plant nursery on Lyndhurst Road, northeast of the town centre. Its range of facilities was extended in 1889, 1900, 1912 and 1923, and there were 78 beds by 1937. In 1975, a 375-bed block was added, and the oldest buildings were replaced in 1997 by a new ward of 120 beds. The latter extension was undertaken by the Worthing and Southlands Hospitals NHS Trust, but since 1 April 2009 Worthing Hospital has been administered by the Western Sussex Hospitals NHS Trust. Meadowfield Hospital, formerly Swandean Isolation Hospital, is a mental health unit based in an 1865 house in High Salvington. It was opened as an isolation hospital in 1897 and later became a geriatric unit. There is another mental health unit at Greenacres, near Worthing Hospital. Goring Hall Hospital is a private hospital operated by BMI Healthcare, with 12 day-care beds and a 38-bed ward. Princess Margaret opened the facility in 1994. The former Courtlands Hospital, opened in 1951 as postoperative care unit operated by Worthing Hospital, was housed in a Grade II listed building in West Worthing until its closure in 1973. It was still used for healthcare functions by West Sussex County Council until 1996.

== Post and telephones ==
Until 1798, post bound for Worthing was conveyed by coach to Steyning and left there for collection. From then, deliveries operated via Shoreham-by-Sea, but in 1807 Worthing's first post office opened and it became a post town. The main post office—a Head Post Office between 1919 and 1985— has occupied eight different sites, but it moved to Chapel Road in 1878 and was rebuilt in Neo-Georgian style in 1930. Public telegraph services began in 1880, although the railway had a system in place from 1859. Worthing's telephone system began in 1890; a manual telephone exchange, once the largest in England, was established in 1912 and was supplemented by a second in Goring-by-Sea in 1929. Automatic exchanges opened in 1966 and 1972.

== Gas and electricity ==
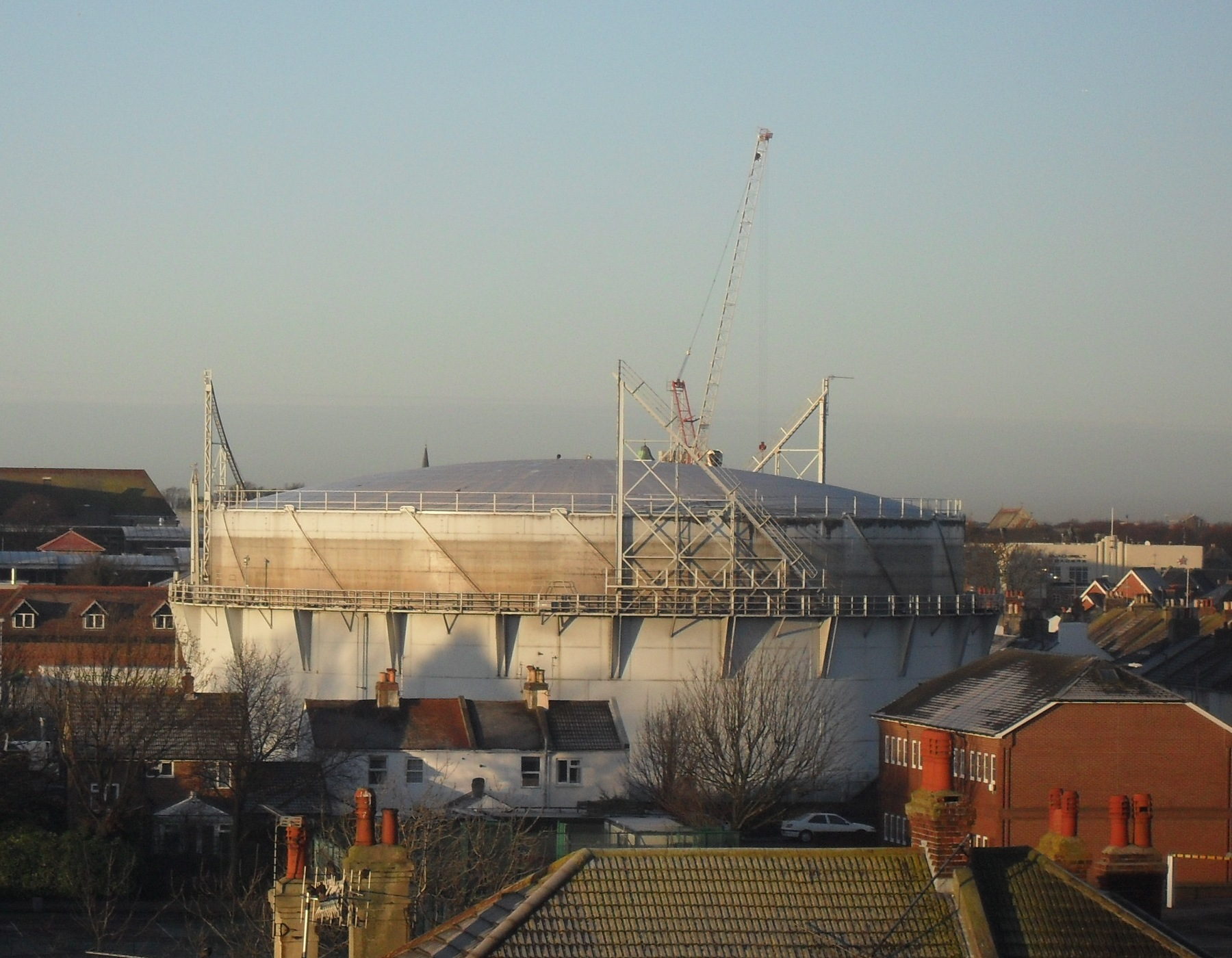
This gasholder stands at Lyndhurst Road.

The town was provided with a gasworks in 1834. Situated on Lyndhurst Road, it produced gas for the whole town, Sompting and Findon by the end of the 19th century. Gas manufacture ceased in 1931, but the site was then used for storage: a gasholder was built in 1934 and used continuously until 2009, and was demolished in 2018. Scotia Gas Networks now supply the town through their Southern Gas Networks division. Electricity was first generated in Worthing in 1901, when the borough spent £32,500 (£4,457,000 as of 2023) on three steam-powered generators. Surrounding suburbs, beginning with Durrington, were connected in the 1920s, and Worthing was served by the National Grid from 1930. The main electricity works on the High Street closed in 1958, but power was generated locally until 1961. The town had more than 500 gas lamps at the end of the 19th century, but in 1901, 110 ornate cast iron arc-light street lamps were installed; only one survives. It was saved from demolition in 1975 and is Grade II-listed. As of 2013, the electricity distribution network operator covering Worthing is UK Power Networks.

== Water supply ==
Worthing relied on springs and wells for water until the Local Board (predecessors of the present Borough Council) authorised a water supply system in 1852. A waterworks was built in 1857 on Little High Street. Robert Rawlinson's Lombardo-Gothic structure cost £30,000 (£3,615,000 as of 2023), with a 110-foot (34 m) tower and a 110,000-imperial-gallon (500,000 L) storage tank, opened in 1857. It went out of use by 1897 and was demolished in 1924. A larger waterworks opened in 1897, and three more supplied the borough by 1927. Southern Water took over the supply in 1974. The company moved its headquarters to Durrington in 1989. Worthing's drinking water is pumped from the chalk aquifer of the South Downs and from the western River Rother, and is classed as being hard: its calcium content is just over 100 mg per litre. (Note: Based on entering the postcode BN11 1HA (Worthing Town Hall) on this webpage and selecting "Drinking water quality".)

== Drainage and sewerage ==
Worthing's typhoid epidemic of 1893, which killed 188 people, was caused by pollution of the water supply after the digging of an extra well to alleviate pressure on the waterworks interfered with an old sewer. This prompted improvements in the town's primitive sewage disposal system, which consisted of a main sewer with an outfall in the English Channel, some subsidiary drains and hundreds of cesspools. In 1894, a new pumping station and outfall were built; this was improved in 1912 and 1932. Durrington and Goring were served by a separate system from 1936. The main sewage works at West Worthing and East Worthing were rebuilt in the 1960s and 1976 respectively. Southern Water has been responsible for all sewage and drainage functions since 1974.

== Cemeteries ==
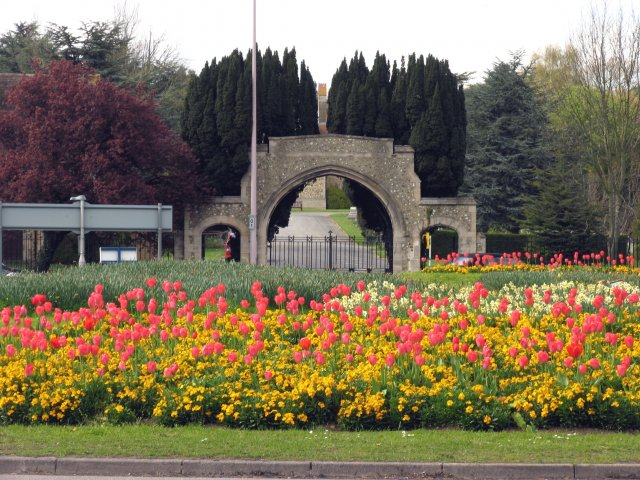
Giles Gilbert Scott designed the gatehouse and chapel of the cemetery at the bottom of Findon Valley.

Worthing's main cemeteries are on South Farm Road in Broadwater (opened in 1862) and the bottom of Findon Valley (opened in 1927 on a 42-acre (17 ha) site). The latter's gatehouse and chapel were designed by Giles Gilbert Scott. Several churches have their own small graveyards, and one existed next to Worthing railway station until about 1908, when its graves were moved to Broadwater. Worthing Crematorium, north of Findon in the neighbouring district of Arun, was opened in 1967–68 on the site of Muntham Court, a mid-18th century Jacobean-style country house which was demolished in 1961.
