= Surrey and Sussex Healthcare NHS Trust =

- Type: NHS hospital trust
- Established: 1988
- Hospitals: East Surrey Hospital; Crawley Hospital; Caterham Dene Hospital, Surrey (Outpatient); Oxted Health Centre, Surrey (Outpatient)
- Chair: Alan McCarthy
- Chief executive: Angela Stevenson
- Staff: 3500
- Website: Surrey and Sussex

Surrey and Sussex Healthcare NHS Trust was formed in April 1998 by merger between East Surrey Healthcare NHS and Crawley Horsham NHS Trusts. It runs East Surrey Hospital in Redhill and outpatient services at Caterham Dene Hospital and Oxted Health Centre in Surrey, and at Crawley Hospital in Crawley, England.

Surrey and Sussex Healthcare NHS Trust is a major local employer, with a diverse workforce of around 3,500 providing healthcare services to a growing population of around 535,000.

== Developments ==
The trust was one of five to benefit from a five-year, £12.5m programme announced by Jeremy Hunt in July 2015 to bring in Virginia Mason Medical Center to assist the English NHS using their clinical engagement and culture tools including the Patient Safety Alert System and electronic dashboard. Hunt said “The achievements at Virginia Mason over the past decade are truly inspirational and I’m delighted they will now help NHS staff to learn the lessons that made their hospital one of the safest in the world – patients will see real benefits as a result.”

It established a joint venture, Frontier Pathology NHS Partnership, with Brighton and Sussex University Hospitals NHS Trust in 2015. It had its accreditation suspended by the United Kingdom Accreditation Service in 2016 when staff shortages affected turn round times.

It was given £924,488 to expand and restructure its emergency department in 2017.

It closed its outpatient fertility clinic in 2016.

== Performance ==
It was named by the Health Service Journal as one of the top hundred NHS trusts to work for in 2015. At that time it had 3161 full-time equivalent staff and a sickness absence rate of 3.33%. 77% of staff recommend it as a place for treatment and 70% recommended it as a place to work. In January 2019 it was rated by the Care Quality Commission as outstanding.

== Cuts ==
Patients who could suffer a heart attack may be refused key tests and possibly life-saving operations under NHS plans to make £55m of budget cuts in Surrey and Sussex. NHS organisations in those two counties are considering limiting how many patients have an angiogram or angioplasty though there is evidence both procedures cut the risk patients will die.

Senior NHS sources in the area also admitted being forced to consider rationing knee arthroscopy operations, cataract removals and tonsillectomies, introducing “lifestyle rationing” so that obese patients and smokers must lose weight and stop smoking before they can have, for example, a knee replacement treating their arthritis (this is considered a false economy because patients will get worse and need treatment later). Beds or hospital wards may be closed, access to hearing aids and In vitro fertilisation may be cut. An anonymous senior NHS figure told The Guardian, “We have been told to leave no stone unturned and think the unthinkable [in the quest to save the £55m]. It’s quite delusional to think we can take out the £106m already planned and now this extra £55m so quickly. But NHS England have told us to do this. The trouble is that, after making lots of efficiency savings in recent years, there is very little fat to take out.”

== See also ==
- Healthcare in Surrey
- Healthcare in Sussex
- List of hospitals in England
- List of NHS trusts
