= East Surrey Hospital =

- Surrey and Sussex Healthcare NHS Trust
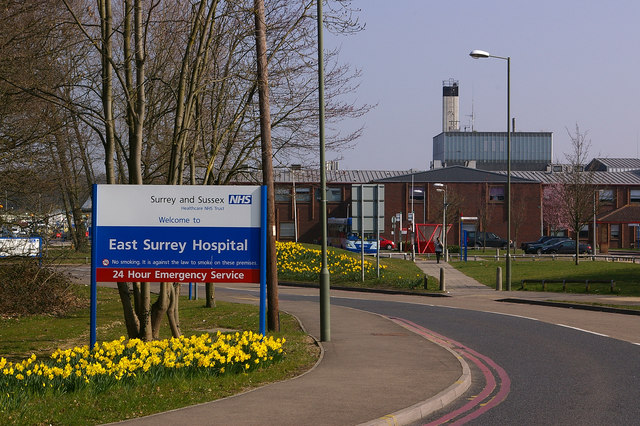
- Entrance to East Surrey Hospital

- Shown in Surrey

Geography
- Location: Redhill, Surrey, England
- Coordinates: 51.2188°N 0.1643°W

Organisation
- Care system: National Health Service
- Type: General
- Affiliated university: Brighton and Sussex Medical School
- Patron: None

Services
- Emergency department: Yes
- Beds: 744

History
- Founded: 1979; 47 years ago

Links
- Website: www.surreyandsussex.nhs.uk/patients-and-visitors/our-sites/east-surrey-hospital

East Surrey Hospital is a National Health Service hospital in the Whitebushes area to the south of Redhill, in Surrey, England. It is managed by the Surrey and Sussex Healthcare NHS Trust.

== History ==
The hospital has its origins in the Reigate Cottage Hospital which was founded by Dr John Walters and opened in Albert Road North, Reigate, in 1866. It moved to Whitepost Hill on the northern edge of Redhill Common as the Reigate and Redhill Hospital in 1871, and became the East Surrey Hospital in 1923. It joined the National Health Service in 1948.

The current facility, which allowed the closure of the previous facility and of the Smallfield Cottage Hospital, opened at Three Arch Road in 1981. The new building was formally opened by the Prime Minister, Margaret Thatcher, on 3 August 1984. The second phase of building, which allowed the closure of Redhill General Hospital at Earlswood Common, opened in 1991 with a formal opening by Virginia Bottomley MP in 1992.

== Services ==
The hospital, a designated trauma unit, offers a wide range of medical services including 24-hour Accident and Emergency, Intensive Care and High Dependency units, gynaecology, obstetrics, midwifery and maternity services, paediatrics and diagnostic imaging, as well as the usual general surgery services. As the nearest accident and emergency facility to London's Gatwick Airport, it is placed on standby when a serious aircraft incident is expected.

== Radio Redhill ==
Radio Redhill is a hospital radio station broadcasting to the patients and staff of the hospital. It is available on 100.4 FM, online and on the hospital's internal radio system. The station won the gold Station of the Year award at the Hospital Broadcasting Awards in 2005.

== See also ==
- Healthcare in Surrey
- List of hospitals in England
