= Muriel Buxton-Thomas =

Nuclear medicine physician and researcher (b. 1945, d. 2016)

Muriel Simisola Buxton-Thomas
- Born: 16 May 1945; Freetown, Sierra Leone
- Died: 16 October 2016 (aged 71)
- Education: MB BS Newcastle(1971); MRCP(1974); MSc Lond(1978); FRCP(1989)
- Relatives: Dr Rachel Buxton (daughter)
- Medical career
- Profession: Physician
- Institutions: Addenbrookes Hospital; St Thomas' Hospital; King's College Hospital
- Sub-specialties: Nuclear Medicine
- Research: Nuclear Medicine

Muriel Buxton-Thomas (May 16, 1945 – October 16, 2016), was an African nuclear medicine physician and researcher.

== Biography ==
Muriel Simisola Buxton-Thomas was born in Freetown, Sierra Leone, to Claude Victor and Claudia Blanche Buxton-Thomas. At the age of 10 her family moved to London, and she attended Wimbledon High School. She enrolled at Newcastle Medical School in 1965, qualifying in 1971. She received her MSc in Nuclear medicine in 1978.

She was Consultant Physician in Nuclear Medicine at St Thomas's Hospital and Medway Hospital between 1984 and 1992. Then she became Clinical Director of Nuclear Medicine at Kings College Hospital until 2010.

The Royal College of Physicians noted in her obituary that '[h]er clinical work embraced many specialties, including endocrinology, adult and paediatric hepatology, osteoporosis and pulmonary medicine.' She oversaw the installation of one of the first PET capable gamma cameras in England in her department at Kings College Hospital.

In 2017 Buxton-Thomas posthumously received the President's medal from the British Nuclear Medicine Society. Her daughter, Dr Rachel Buxton-Thomas, is Consultant Respiratory Physician at Brighton and Sussex University Hospitals.
