= St Martin's Hospital, Canterbury =

St Martin's Hospital
- Kent and Medway NHS and Social Care Partnership Trust
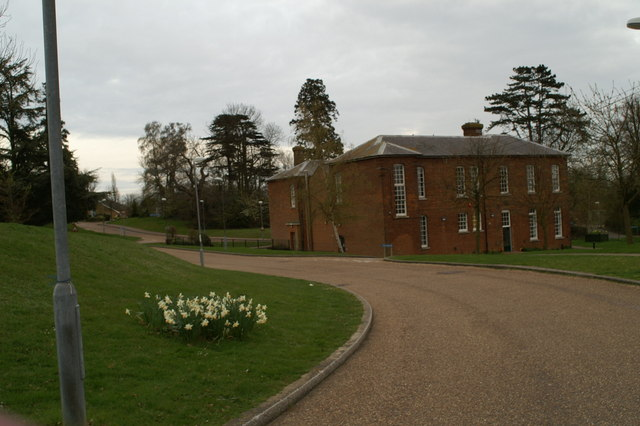
- St Martin's Hospital

- Shown in Kent

Geography
- Location: Canterbury, Kent, England
- Coordinates: 51.27723°N 1.10743°E

Organisation
- Care system: NHS
- Type: Specialist

Services
- Speciality: Mental health

History
- Founded: 1902

Links
- Lists: Hospitals in England

St Martin's Hospital is a mental health facility on Littlebourne Road in Canterbury, Kent, England. It is managed by the Kent and Medway NHS and Social Care Partnership Trust.

== History ==
The hospital, which was designed by William Joseph Jennings and Gray using a compact arrow layout, opened in 1902. The hospital became Canterbury City Mental Hospital in the 1920s and joined the National Health Service as St Martin's Hospital in 1948.

After the introduction of Care in the Community in the early 1980s, the hospital went into a period of decline and inpatient services significantly reduced. In February 2019 the Trust announced the sale of one of its older wards to Homes England for use as social housing with the proceeds being applied to upgrade newer wards.
