= Chris Sutton (gynaecologist) =

British physician

Christopher Sutton (6 October 1941 – 25 March 2023) was a British gynaecologist who was the first to do laser laparoscopy in the UK.

== Early life and education ==
Born on 6 October 1941 in Abergavenny, Monmouthshire to Ivy, a nurse, and Joseph Sutton, an estate agency owner. He was educated at Smallwood Manor and Denstone College. Later, he studied medicine at Trinity College, Cambridge, beginning in 1960.

At Cambridge, Sutton was active in whitewater canoe slalom and became the British Universities champion. He also led the Cambridge Greenland kayak expedition in 1962, which included a fundraising effort involving a kayak crossing of the English Channel.

== Career ==
After completing his clinical training in the UK and a brief period as a GP in Toronto, Canada, Sutton specialized in obstetrics and gynaecology, working at several UK hospitals including Northwick Park Hospital and Addenbrooke's Hospital. He later became a consultant at the Royal Surrey County Hospital in Guildford, where he specialized in gynaecological endoscopy. He was a founding member and president of the British Society for Gynaecological Endoscopy and served as president of the obstetrics and gynaecology section of the Royal Society of Medicine.

== Personal life ==
Sutton met Françoise ("Fanchon") in 1961 in Cambridge, and they married in 1965. They had three daughters: Natalie, Vanessa, and Camilla.
