= St Richard's Hospital =

- University Hospitals Sussex NHS Foundation Trust
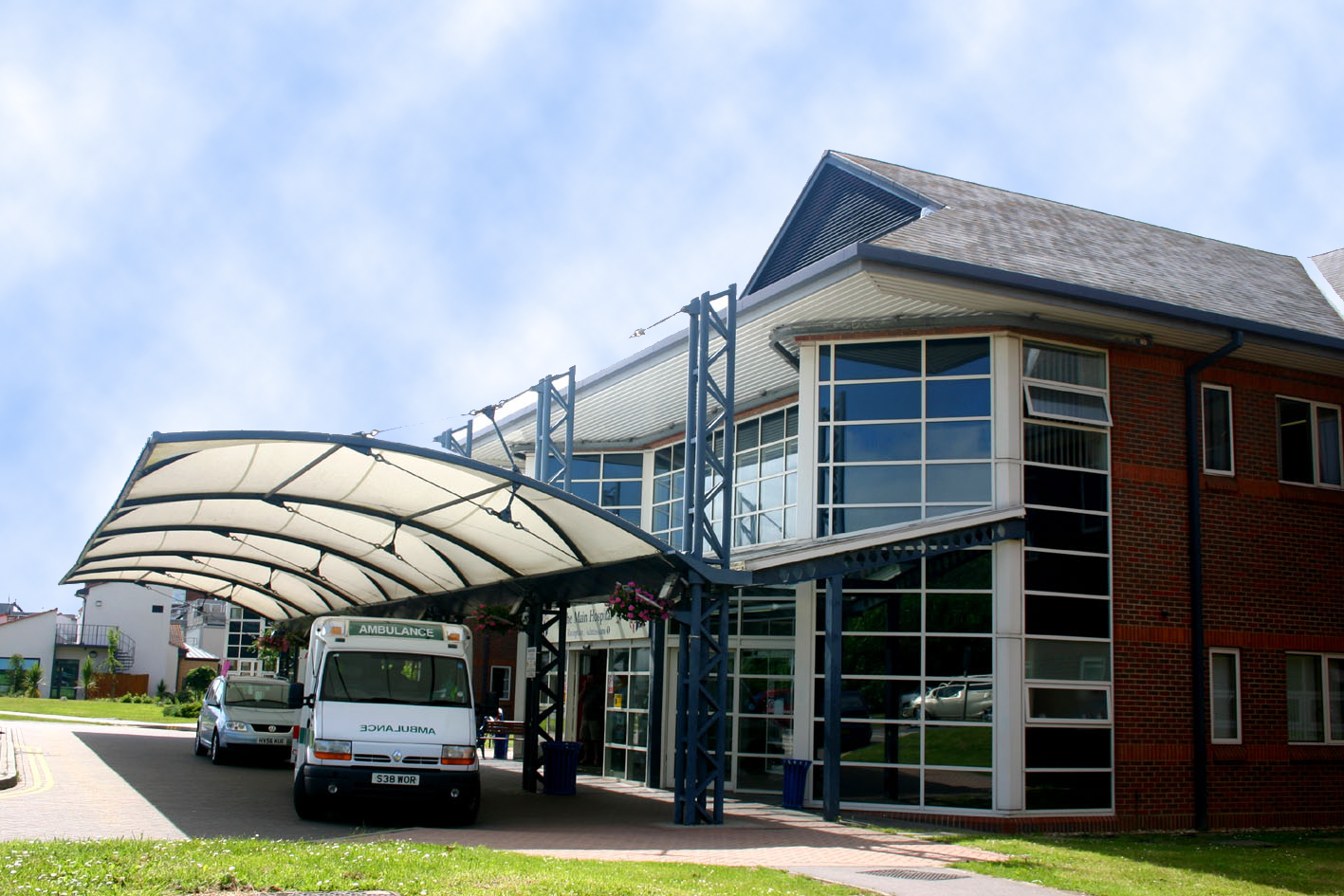
- St Richard's Hospital

- Shown in West Sussex

Geography
- Location: Chichester, West Sussex, England, United Kingdom
- Coordinates: 50.8430°N 0.7702°W

Organisation
- Care system: Public NHS
- Type: District general

Services
- Emergency department: Yes Accident & Emergency
- Beds: approx 430

History
- Founded: 1938

Links
- Website: https://www.uhsussex.nhs.uk/
- Lists: Hospitals in England

St Richard's Hospital is a medium-sized District General Hospital (DGH) located in Chichester, West Sussex, England. It is now part of University Hospitals Sussex.

== History ==
The hospital has its origins in a facility named after Richard de Wych, a former Bishop of Chichester, commissioned by West Sussex County Council in 1937 and built between 1938 and 1939. At the start of the Second World War the Government designated it an Emergency Medical Service hospital and, by 1940, ten hutted wards had been added, taking the number of beds to 594.

After the hospital joined the National Health Service in 1948, the Postgraduate Medical Education Centre opened on the hospital site in 1966 and new accident and emergency, outpatient, x-ray and maternity departments were completed in 1970. Donald Wilson House, the hospital's neurological rehabilitation unit, opened in 1975 and the intensive care unit and coronary care unit followed in 1977. After the hospital attained NHS Trust status in 1994, a new building, containing wards, physiotherapy and operating theatres was completed in 1996.

In May 2008, the West Sussex Primary Care Trust Board recommended that Worthing Hospital be the 'major general hospital' for West Sussex and that St Richard's Hospital be downgraded. A new children's ward was completed in February 2011.

In April 2014 the maternity unit was awarded the prestigious 'level three' award under the Clinical Negligence Scheme for Trusts and in 2016 the hospital was rated as 'Outstanding' by the Care Quality Commission although they reported that the hospital's responsiveness required improvement.

== Services ==
The hospital has approximately 430 beds, including six ITU beds, a high dependency unit and a maternity unit. There is an accident and emergency department. The Chichester Treatment Centre treats patients on a day care basis. The hospital has an NHS fertility clinic which also treats some private patients.

== See also ==
- Healthcare in Sussex
- List of hospitals in England
