= Healthcare in Surrey =

Healthcare in Surrey, England was the responsibility of five Clinical Commissioning Groups: East Surrey, North West Surrey, Surrey Downs, Guildford and Waverley, and Surrey Heath from 2013 to 2020 when East Surrey, North West Surrey, Surrey Downs, Guildford and Waverley merged to form Surrey Heartlands CCG. The new organisation started with a £62 million deficit.

== History ==
From 1947 to 1974 NHS services in Surrey were managed by the South-West Metropolitan Regional Hospital Board. In 1974 the boards were abolished and replaced by regional health authorities. Surrey came under the South West Thames RHA apart from Spelthorne which came under the North West Thames RHA. Regions were reorganised in 1996 and the whole of Surrey came under the South Thames Regional Health Authority. The county had its own Area Health Authority from 1974 until 2000 when they were abolished. The county was divided into five district health authorities for East Surrey, Mid Surrey, North West Surrey, South West Surrey and West Surrey and North East Hampshire. West Surrey and North East Hampshire was abolished in 1994. Regional health authorities were reorganised and renamed strategic health authorities in 2002. The whole county was part of Surrey and Sussex SHA. In 2006 regions were again reorganised and Surrey came under NHS South East Coast until that was abolished in 2013. There were originally five primary care trusts for the area but they were merged into one in 2005.

The clinical commissioning groups took on the responsibilities of the former PCTs in April 2013.

== Sustainability and transformation plans ==
There are three plans for the county. In March 2016 Sir Andrew Morris, Chief Executive of Frimley Health NHS Foundation Trust, was appointed the leader of the Frimley Health Sustainability and transformation plan footprint, which covers the areas of Bracknell and Ascot CCG, North East Hampshire and Farnham CCG, Slough CCG, Surrey Heath CCG and Windsor, Ascot and Maidenhead CCG. East Surrey and Sussex formed a separate sustainability and transformation plan area with Michael Wilson, the Chief Executive of Surrey and Sussex Healthcare NHS Trust as its leader, as did Surrey Heartlands, under the leadership of Julia Ross, the Chief Executive of North West Surrey Clinical Commissioning Group. The three CCGs in Surrey Heartlands, Guildford and Waverley, North West Surrey and Surrey Downs appointed a single chief officer in May 2017. Their plan centres on new models of care in the community.

Surrey Heartlands is to have a health and social care devolution style deal along the lines of the devolution in Manchester, bringing the NHS together with Surrey County Council. Ian Smith, who was also previously executive chair of Four Seasons Health Care and chief executive of the General Healthcare Group, was appointed chair of the Surrey Heartlands integrated care board in October 2021.

== Commissioning ==
Surrey Downs CCG, where 20% of the population is over 65 (expected to increase to 27% by 2025), are contemplating a reduction in the provision of community hospitals in 2016. It expects a deficit of £35 million for 2016/7.

East Surrey Clinical Commissioning Group was put under restrictions by NHS England in December 2015 because of a budget deficit of £24.7 million. In April 2016 the deficit was expected to reach £31.66 million for 2016/7, despite planned savings of more than £10 million.

== Primary care ==
There are 128 GP practices in Surrey. The county has its own local medical committee. Out-of-hours services are provided by IC24 in East Surrey and by Care UK.

In January 2016 it was reported that some GPs in Crawley had closed their lists and that surgeries were having difficulty in recruiting doctors.

== Acute care ==
The main hospital providers in the county are Frimley Park Hospital NHS Foundation Trust and Surrey and Sussex Healthcare NHS Trust. There is a joint venture Surrey Pathology Service established in 2012.

Guildford and Waverley Clinical Commissioning Group organised a programme of in-reach GPs in 2015, where GPs were placed in wards of the Royal Surrey County Hospital reviewing patients who had been admitted and advising on possibilities for discharge.

== Mental health ==
Surrey and Borders Partnership NHS Foundation Trust provides mental health services.

== Community services ==
As a result of the Transforming Community Services programme East Elmbridge and Mid Surrey PCT was required to needed to separate its provider and commissioning arms. It was decided to establish a not-for-profit, limited liability company owned by local nurses and therapists called Central Surrey Health. This was the first community healthcare social enterprise to be "spun out" of the NHS, in 2006. It is now known as CSH Surrey. Surrey Downs Clinical Commissioning Group is undertaking a review into the future of the four community hospitals run by CSH because of a forecast deficit of £10.7m by the end of 2014/5. The company successfully challenged in October 2018 when they claimed they had been excluded from a contract given to the Integrated Dorking Epsom and East Elmbridge Alliance of which they had originally been part of.

The Epsom Health and Care Provider Alliance, a partnership established in 2015 between Epsom and St Helier University Hospitals NHS Trust, Surrey County Council, CSH Surrey and a consortium of 20 GP practices agreed a business plan for £12.3 million of services for 2018–19.

The contract for Guildford and Waverley in 2016 was one of the first major community services contracts to be won by a private company. Virgin Care won the contract, in partnership with Royal Surrey County Hospital NHS Foundation Trust and Surrey County Council. However it was suspended in February 2017 because the clinical commissioning group was concerned whether it could deliver the specification for integrated services "with the key partners that had been identified in their bid submission". From 2018, services are provided by Royal Surrey County Hospital and Procare, the local GP Federation which will have a nine-year contract with an annual value of just under £14 million. Virgin Care will continue to provide services for people covered by Surrey Heath Clinical Commissioning Group's and those living in and around Farnham.

== HealthWatch ==
There is a Healthwatch organisation in the county.

== See also ==
- Category:Health in Surrey
- Healthcare in the United Kingdom
