= Princess Royal Hospital, Haywards Heath =

Princess Royal Hospital
- University Hospitals Sussex NHS Foundation Trust
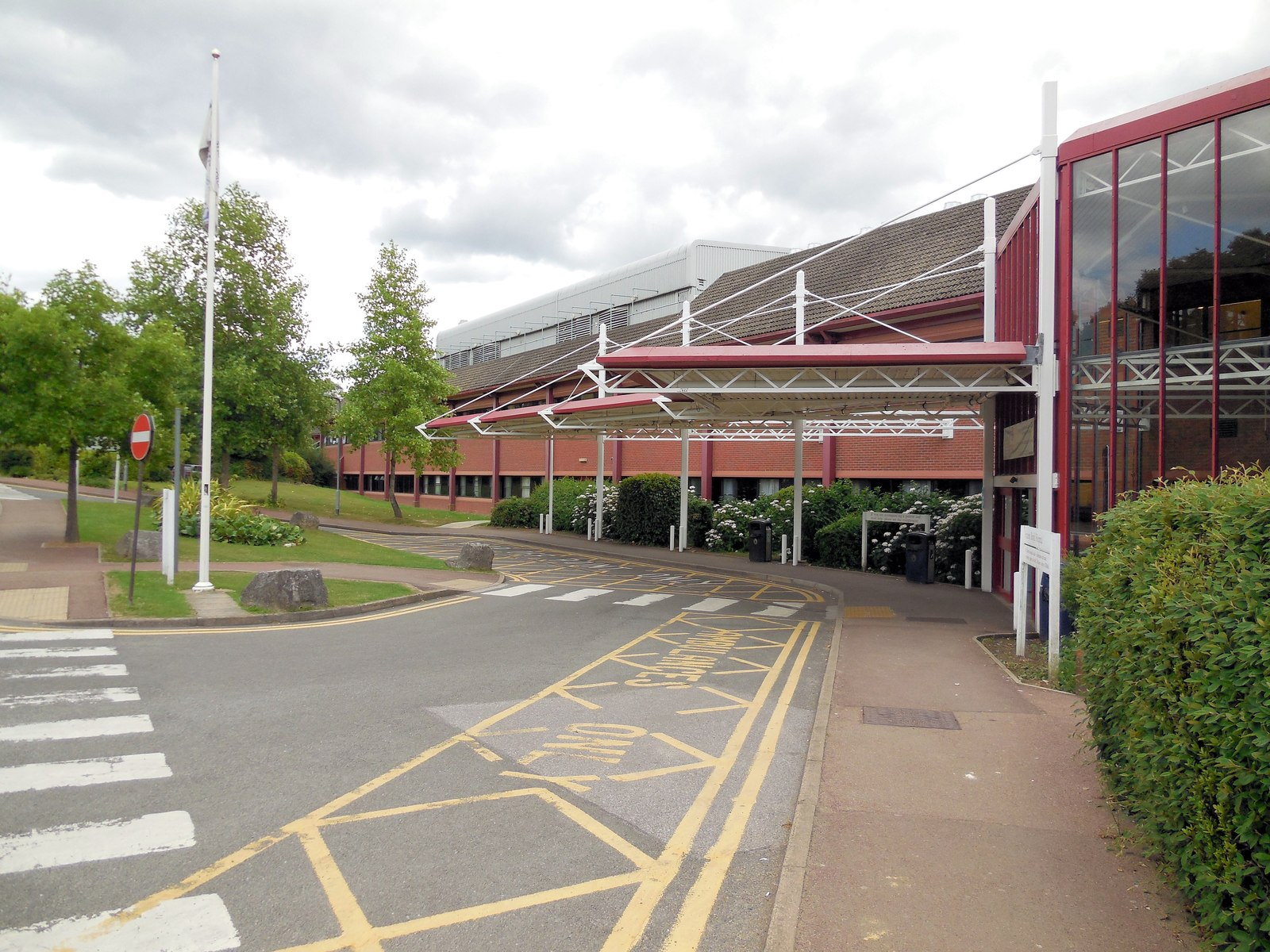
- The main entrance of the hospital

Geography
- Location: Haywards Heath, West Sussex, England
- Coordinates: 50.9911°N 0.0906°W

Organisation
- Care system: National Health Service
- Type: General
- Affiliated university: Brighton and Sussex Medical School

Services
- Emergency department: Yes

History
- Founded: 1991

Links
- Website: www.uhsussex.nhs.uk/hospitals/princess-royal-hospital/

The Princess Royal Hospital, also known as PRH, is an acute, teaching, general hospital located in Haywards Heath, West Sussex, England. It is the main hospital in the Mid Sussex district and is part of University Hospitals Sussex NHS Foundation Trust along with the larger Royal Sussex County Hospital and several other facilities, mostly in nearby Brighton.

== History ==
The hospital stands on part of the site of St Francis Hospital, a mental hospital founded as the Sussex County Lunatic Asylum in 1859. The new buildings were completed in 1991. In 2017 local councillors expressed concerns that the hospital was at risk of being downgraded.

== Services ==
The hospital has medical and surgical facilities, along with adult intensive care, ear, nose & throat, diabetic medicine, geriatrics, haematology, urology and cardiac services. It works interdependently with the other hospitals in the trust to provide a complete service.

== Performance ==
As a trust (including the other sites), the hospital was rated 6th best in the country for safety, and in the top 5% for hospital survival rates, in the year 2009-10.

== See also ==
- Healthcare in Sussex
- List of hospitals in England
