= Farnham Road Hospital =

- Surrey and Borders Partnership NHS Foundation Trust
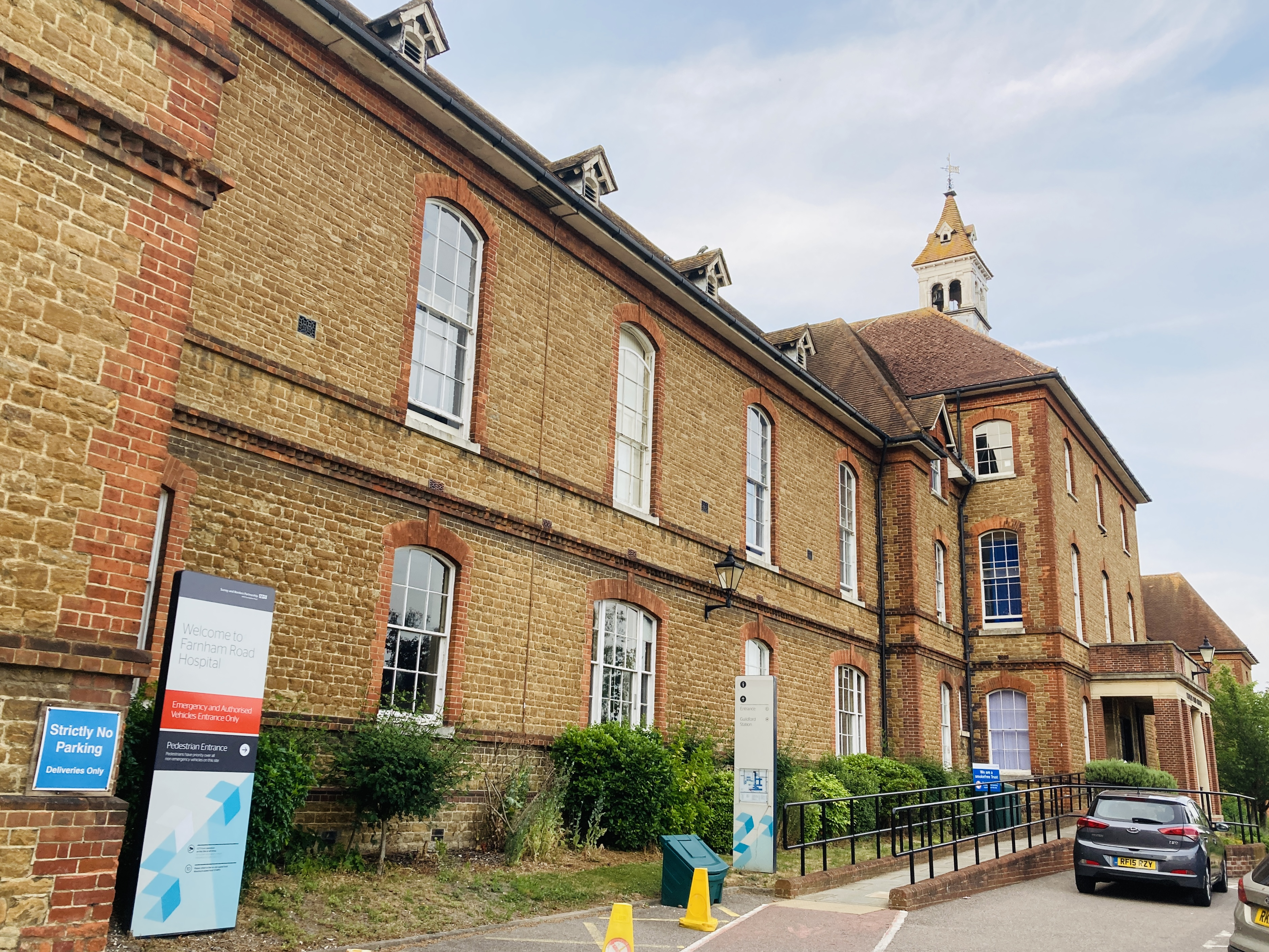
- Entrance to Farnham Road Hospital in 2023

- Shown in Surrey

Geography
- Location: Guildford, England
- Coordinates: 51.235278°N 0.584607°W

Organisation
- Care system: National Health Service

Helipads
- Helipad: No

History
- Founded: 1863

Links
- Website: www.sabp.nhs.uk
- Lists: Hospitals in England

Farnham Road Hospital is a mental health hospital in Guildford, Surrey. It is managed by Surrey and Borders Partnership NHS Foundation Trust. The main building is a Grade II listed building.

== History ==
The foundation stone for the hospital was laid by Charles Richard Sumner, Bishop of Winchester, at a site donated by the Earl of Onslow in Farnham Road in Guildford in 1863. The 60-bed hospital was designed by Edward Ward Lower drawing on the ideas of Florence Nightingale and was opened as the Royal Surrey County Hospital in April 1866. The Royal Surrey County Hospital moved to its current site in Egerton Road in Guildford in 1979.

The Farnham Road site was redeveloped between December 2013 and December 2015 to create a modern purpose-built mental health facility.
