= University Hospitals Sussex NHS Foundation Trust =

NHS foundation trust in Sussex

- Type: NHS foundation trust
- Established: 1 April 2021
- Headquarters: Worthing, West Sussex, England
- Hospitals: Princess Royal Hospital; Royal Alexandra Children's Hospital; Royal Sussex County Hospital; Southlands Hospital; St Richard's Hospital; Worthing Hospital
- Staff: 17,352 WTE (2024/25)
- Website: www.uhsussex.nhs.uk

University Hospitals Sussex NHS Foundation Trust is an NHS foundation trust which provides clinical services to people in Brighton and Hove, parts of East Sussex and West Sussex. It is abbreviated UHSussex or UHSx.

== History ==
The trust was established on 1 April 2021 following the merger of Brighton and Sussex University Hospitals NHS Trust and Western Sussex Hospitals NHS Foundation Trust.

In 2023 UHSussex opened the new £400million Louisa Martindale Building at the Brighton site.

== Hospitals ==
The trust runs the following hospitals:

- Princess Royal Hospital, Haywards Heath
- Royal Alexandra Children's Hospital, Brighton
- Royal Sussex County Hospital, Brighton
- St Richard's Hospital, Chichester
- Southlands Hospital, Shoreham-by-Sea
- Sussex Eye Hospital, Brighton
- Worthing Hospital, Worthing

Additional services are run from Brighton General Hospital, Hove Polyclinic, Lewes Victoria Hospital, and a number of other satellite clinics.

== Performance ==
In October 2022 UHSussex was inspected by the CQC with the report published in May 2023. It found that the hospitals were Outstanding in three areas (Effective, Caring and Use of Resources). Requires improvement in Safe and Responsive but Inadequate in Well-led. This gave a combined rating of Outstanding and an overall rating of Requires improvement (CQC May 2023)

In July 2022 it was reported that patients experiencing a mental health crisis had been kept in a “short stay area” of the Emergency Department at the Royal Sussex County Hospital for up to three weeks waiting for a mental health placement. It is an area with no natural light, no TV or radio and only a toilet and washbasin, with a shower available on a neighbouring ward. Between 1 February and 16 April, the Care Quality Commission found there had been 67 days when more than 18 patients had been accommodated in corridors. There were also many delays in emergency surgery.
