= St Luke's Hospital, Guildford =

St Luke's Hospital
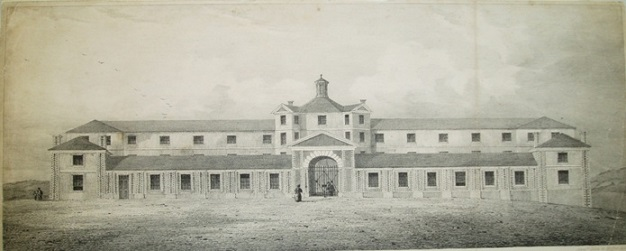
- Guildford Union Workhouse

- Shown in Surrey

Geography
- Location: Guildford, Surrey, England
- Coordinates: 51°14′11″N 0°33′35″W

Organisation
- Care system: NHS England
- Type: District General

History
- Founded: 1856
- Closed: 1996

St Luke's Hospital, Guildford was a National Health Service hospital in Guildford, Surrey.

== History ==
The facility has its origins in the Guildford Poor Law Infirmary established in 1856. The infirmary was enlarged in 1870 and replaced by a new facility laid out in pavilion style in 1893. It became the Warren Road Hospital in 1930 and it joined the National Health Service as St Luke's Hospital in 1948. After services transferred to the Royal Surrey County Hospital, St Luke’s Hospital closed in 1996.
