= Royal Sussex County Hospital =

- University Hospitals Sussex NHS Foundation Trust
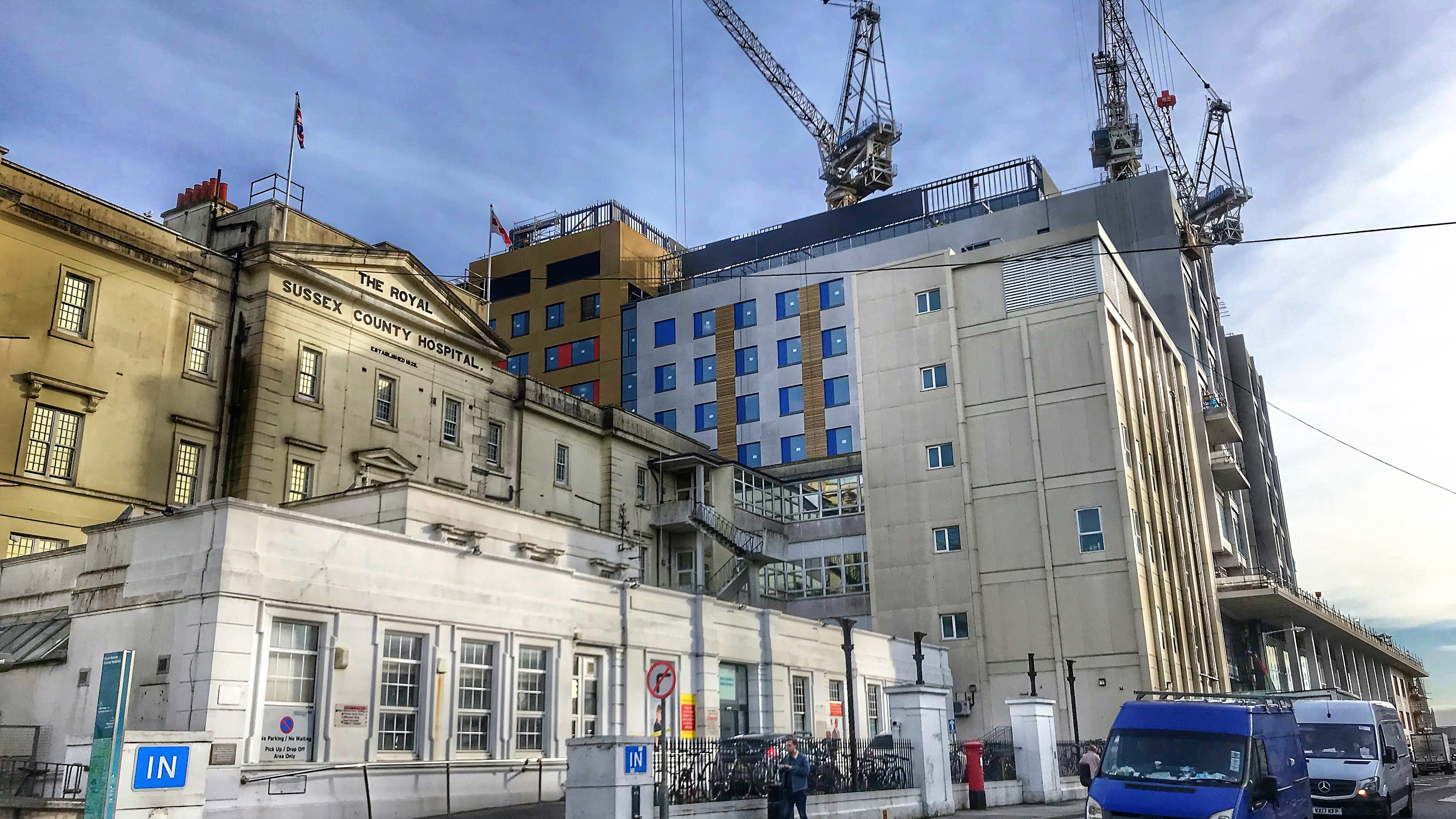
- The hospital in 2020, showing the now-demolished Barry Building and the Louisa Martindale Building under construction

- Shown in East Sussex

Geography
- Location: Brighton, East Sussex, England
- Coordinates: 50°49′09″N 0°07′01″W

Organisation
- Care system: National Health Service
- Type: Teaching
- Affiliated university: Brighton and Sussex Medical School

Services
- Emergency department: Major Trauma Centre
- Beds: 785

Helipads
- Helipad: Yes

History
- Founded: 1828

Links
- Website: www.uhsussex.nhs.uk/hospitals/royal-sussex-county-hospital/

The Royal Sussex County Hospital is an acute teaching hospital in Brighton, England. Together with the Princess Royal Hospital, it is administered by the University Hospitals Sussex NHS Foundation Trust. The services provided at the hospital include an emergency department, cancer services at the Sussex Cancer Centre, cardiac surgery, maternity services, and both adult and neonatal intensive care units.

== History ==
The main building was designed by Charles Barry, who was later architect for the Houses of Parliament, and is still called the Barry Building. The foundation stone was laid by the Earl of Egremont on 16 March 1826, and the hospital was opened as the Sussex County Hospital on 11 June 1828. The Victoria Wing was added in 1839, and the Adelaide Wing was opened in 1841. The Sussex County Hospital became the Royal Sussex County Hospital in about 1911.

On New Year's Day 1872, a fire broke out on the top floor of the Adelaide Wing of the hospital, in Ward 6. Initially this fire threatened to destroy the building, but the efforts of volunteer firefighters and a detachment of the 19th Hussars saved the building.

The Jubilee Building was added to the hospital in 1887 and the Sussex Eye Hospital (one of local architect John Leopold Denman's many Neo-Georgian buildings) opened in 1935.

The main and tallest building of the hospital, the Thomas Kemp Tower, started construction in the late 1960s. It is the 8th tallest structure in Brighton and Hove and is prominent on the city's skyline, reaching 15 floors, at a height of 58.9 m (193 ft).

In October 1984, after the Provisional IRA bombed the Grand Hotel where members of the Government were staying during the Conservative Party annual conference, the hospital received many of the injured.

In 2005 an episode of the BBC investigative programme Panorama featured secretly filmed material taken by a nurse and an undercover journalist. The programme highlighted serious failings in the standards of care and procedures and showed scenes that were described by the Chief Executive of the Brighton and Sussex University Hospitals NHS Trust, which was responsible for the hospital, as "very disturbing images".

The Millennium Building was completed in 2000 and the Audrey Emerton Building, built to accommodate clinical medical students of Brighton and Sussex Medical School, was opened by Baroness Emerton in 2005. In 2009, proposals to demolish the Barry and Jubilee buildings as part of a £300m redevelopment scheme began to emerge.

=== 2020s redevelopment ===
In the early 2020s, the 3Ts Redevelopment began at the hospital, which was a three-stage project that replaced all of the buildings on the front half of the hospital, some of which were almost 200 years old. The three Ts stood for trauma, teaching and tertiary care. It was expected to cost £485 million when it was approved, but by 2021 was significantly delayed and over budget. The whole project was expected to be completed by 2026.

In the old buildings' place were two brand new clinical buildings, intended to accommodate around 40 new wards and departments. The Stage 1 building was the first of the two, and covered 13 floors, 11 of which were above ground.

Stage 2 was a new cancer centre, and Stage 3 was a new service yard.

The 11-storey Louisa Martindale Building opened to patients on 12 June 2023, at a cost of £485 million. The building was named after Louisa Martindale, a physician, surgeon and writer who worked in Brighton. In 2024 the building won two awards at the European Healthcare Design Awards, winning the 'Healthcare Design' category and the 'Interior Design and Arts' award.

In June 2023 it was announced that demolition of the 195-year-old Barry Building, thought to be the oldest acute hospital building still in use in England, would take place in 2024. The demolition and clearing of the site was begun in February 2024 and completed in August.

==== Helideck ====
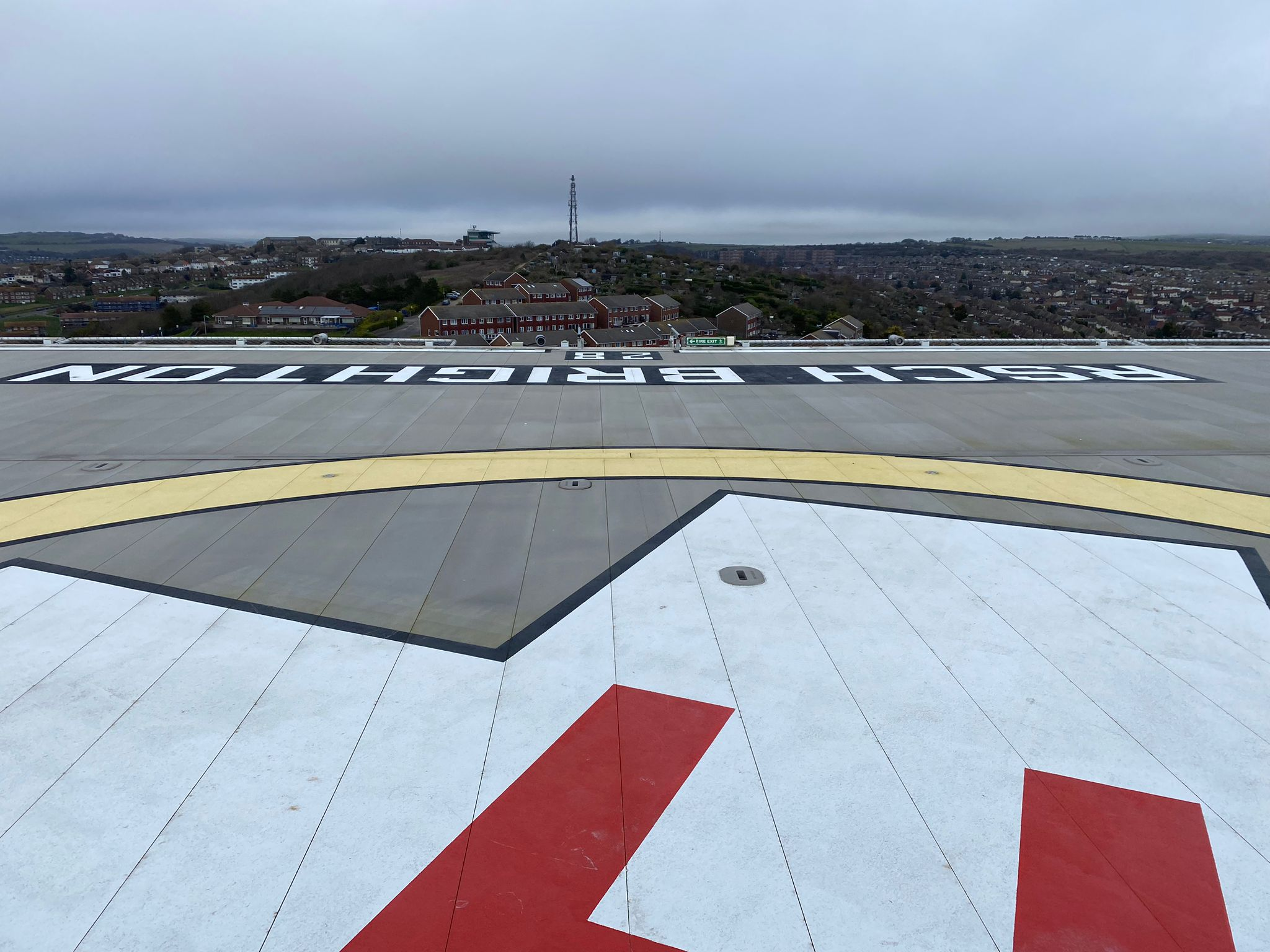
The helideck pictured in February 2023, with Whitehawk Hill transmitting station in the background.

The project is also providing a much needed helideck for air ambulances on top of the Thomas Kemp Tower, from which the most severe patients can be taken directly to A&E via a dedicated lift. Air ambulances taking patients to the hospital currently have to land at East Brighton Park, almost a mile away.

The helideck was originally expected to be in use by 2019. The delays were due to the COVID-19 pandemic, as well as fears that helicopters may blow the cladding off the hospital's walls, or damage the tower that the helideck sits on. It is now expected to become operational in 2026.

== See also ==
- List of hospitals in England
- List of medical schools in the United Kingdom
- Brighton and Sussex Medical School
- Healthcare in Sussex
