= Central Surrey Health =

Central Surrey Health, also known as CSH Surrey, was the first employee-owned community healthcare social enterprise to be “spun out” of the NHS, in 2006. It is one of the 11 health and social care providers who are known as the Surrey Heartlands Health and Care Partnership.

It runs four community hospitals, in Leatherhead, Molesey, New Epsom and Ewell, and Dorking.

It was set up as a not-for-profit, limited liability company under contract to provide community nursing and therapy services on behalf of the East Elmbridge and Mid Surrey Primary Care Trust. About 650 former PCT nursing and therapy staff transferred to the new organisation. The Financial Times said it would operate "a little like a John Lewis-style partnership, with staff owning the company, which can make profits but will also risk going bust." It had a three-year contract worth about £20m a year. The intention at the time was to encourage more of the same with a unit in the Department of Health that would have a budget to help create business plans for other staff to follow suit. Health service unions Amicus and UNISON saw this as further evidence of the government's desire to break up the NHS.

However, in 2011 NHS Surrey failed to renew the contract and awarded the five year £500m local community services contract to Assura Medical. It appeared that because it did not have £10 million in the bank as surety for the contract CSH lost out.

It is involved in a community-based diabetes service for Surrey Downs Clinical Commissioning Group with Kingston Hospital NHS Foundation Trust South West London and St George's Mental Health NHS Trust, and local GPs to start in November 2014.

In September 2014 the organisation, now trading as CSH, in partnership with Bupa won a five-year contract from Coastal West Sussex Clinical Commissioning Group for £235m to provide musculoskeletal services. Western Sussex Hospitals NHS Foundation Trust raised fears that its A&E units could be affected when it lost the bid but according to West Sussex County Council NHS commissioners guaranteed future services at the Trust. The plans were abandoned in January 2015 when it was concluded that trauma services at the Trust would become unviable if the deal went ahead.

In 2017 its turnover was £32 million and operating profit of £322,000. It employed 801 people. It has an employee council called The Voice that interacts with its board of directors. The company's shares are held by Guardian Shareholders, who are employees accountable to the Guardian Trust.

See also Healthcare in Surrey
