= Surrey and Borders Partnership NHS Foundation Trust =

NHS mental health trust

- Type: Mental health trust
- Established: April 2005
- Budget: £324m
- Hospitals: Burslem community Hospital; Leek community Hospital; Cheadle community Hospital; Longton community Hospital; Bradwell community Hospital
- Chair: Dr Ian McPherson
- Chief executive: Graham Wareham
- Staff: 2300
- Website: http://www.sabp.nhs.uk/

Surrey and Borders Partnership NHS Foundation Trust is an NHS foundation trust in England formed by the merger of Surrey and Hampshire Borders, Surrey Oaklands and North West Surrey Partnership NHS trusts in April 2005, with an emphasis on the mental sides of healthcare.

The trust operates at over 30 sites including:

- April Cottage in Horley
- Larkfield in Horley
- St Peter's Site in Chertsey
- Loddon Alliance in Basingstoke
- Mid Surrey Assessment and Treatment Service
- St Ebbas, Hillcroft, West Park Hospital, The Shieling, Ethel Bailey Close and Oakglade in Epsom
- The Ridgewood Centre in Camberley
- Farnham Road Hospital (Mental Health Unit) in Guildford
- Redstone House and Margaret Laurie House Inpatient Rehabilitation Unit in Reigate
- Redstone House and the Crisis House in Redhill, Surrey
- Fairmead in Staines
- Oaklands in Caterham
- Courthill House in Chipstead, Surrey
- Rosewood in Charlwood
- The Old School House in Oxted
- Willows at Woking Community Hospital.

It plans to buy the Jubilee Complex at Headley Court, near Leatherhead, a former rehabilitation centre for injured soldiers. This would provide about 44 mental health beds, which could save the trust money spent on placements in private hospitals. It placed 320 patients with private providers in 2020-21, at a cost of £7.8 million.

== Operation ==
It is one of three large trusts in the South East Coast area which may compete to offer new services in its area, the others being Kent and Medway NHS and Social Care Partnership Trust and Sussex Partnership NHS Trust.

The Trust's memory services serving a minority of its area, Runnymede and West Elmbridge, achieved the top rating in a national accreditation scheme developed by the Royal College of Psychiatrists in 2012.

In November 2013 the Trust was inspected by the Care Quality Commission whose teams spent three days checking the Trust's services. They found "safety and suitability concerns" and warned that male and female patients’ privacy was "compromised because people could be seen by other patients in their rooms at any time" and that patients were "not always involved in making decisions about their care". There have also been significant breaches of patient confidentiality.

The Trust runs the Hope Service for young people in Surrey with Surrey County Council, and Guildford and Waverley Clinical Commissioning Group. It works with about 50 young people at any one time who suffer from depression, suicidal feelings, ADHD, eating disorders, family difficulties and family breakdown.

It was named by the Health Service Journal as one of the top hundred NHS trusts to work for in 2015. At that time it had 2254 full time equivalent staff and a sickness absence rate of 3.59%. 61% of staff recommend it as a place for treatment and 565% recommended it as a place to work.

In 2021 it was overspending by almost £200,000 a month because of demand for children’s services, with increases in demand for children’s services of up to 40% since the COVID-19 pandemic in England began.

== See also ==
- List of NHS trusts
- Healthcare in Surrey
