= Kent and Medway Mental Health NHS Trust =

- Type: Mental health trust
- Established: April 2006
- Disbanded: October 2014
- Headquarters: Farm Villa, Maidstone ME16 9PH
- Region served: Cumbria, England
- Budget: £178 Million
- Chair: Andrew Ling
- Chief executive: Sheila Stenson
- Staff: 3500

Kent and Medway Mental Health NHS Trust was formed in April 2006 by a merger between East Kent NHS and Social Care Partnership Trust and West Kent NHS and Social Care Trust.

The trust runs inpatient and community services for those with mental health needs, community and inpatient services for older people (dementia and Alzheimer's disease), forensic and specialist services (including mother and infant services, disability and substance misuse) in Kent and Medway.

It is one of three large trusts in the South East Coast area which are in competition for new business, the others being Surrey and Borders Partnership NHS Foundation Trust and Sussex Partnership NHS Trust.

== Performance ==
In 2015 the Care Quality Commission rated the trust as in need of improvement, but in 2017 all 10 core services, were rated as Outstanding or Good.

It was named by the Health Service Journal as one of the top hundred NHS trusts to work for in 2015. At that time it had 2878 full-time equivalent staff and a sickness absence rate of 4.41%. 53% of staff recommend it as a place for treatment and 51% recommended it as a place to work.

In 2015 the trust was told by the Care Quality Commission to review its community team caseloads because they were not being safely managed.

== See also ==
- Healthcare in Kent
