= Swandean Isolation Hospital =

- Sussex Partnership NHS Trust

Geography
- Location: Arundel Road, Worthing, West Sussex, BN13 3EP, West Sussex, England
- Coordinates: 50.8419°N 0.4105°W

History
- Opened: 1896/7
- Closed: By 1975

Swandean Isolation Hospital was an eighteen-bedded isolation hospital in Durrington, Worthing, West Sussex.

== History ==
In 1897 Swandean House, a mansion built in 1865, was taken over by Worthing Borough Council for use as a municipal isolation hospital to care for people with infectious diseases. Initially leased, it was purchased by the council in 1903. It was one of hundreds of isolation hospitals opened during the later nineteenth century to isolate and treat people with diseases such as diphtheria, scarlet fever, typhoid fever and tuberculosis. By 1914 there were 755 isolation and fever hospitals, compared to 700 Poor Law infirmaries and nearly 600 general hospitals.

The hospital gained its first qualified staff in 1905, and the building was extended three years later. There were other alterations and extensions between 1936 and 1938 and in 1962. A dedicated tuberculosis ward was added in 1951, followed by a unit for geriatric patients in 1957. With widespread immunisations the incidence of infectious diseases fell, and by 1975 it was repurposed into a care of the elderly unit. By 1992 it had 110 beds. It is now part of Meadowfield Hospital and provides inpatient mental health services for the elderly.

== Notable staff ==
- Rose Agnes Hall (1869–1947) was matron from 1905 until late 1934. Hall worked at one year at each of the Mildmay Mission Hospital, Hackney Hospital, and the Cancer Hospital in Fulham Road, before training at The London Hospital under Matron Eva Luckes between 1899 and 1901. She worked for the hospital's Private Nurses institution before being appointed sister/night superintendent at Plaistow Isolation Hospital in 1903. Whilst she was matron Hall gave evidence at a coroners inquest into the death of a young probationer nurse who was burnt whilst on night duty. After her retirement Hall remained in Worthing where she died in 1947.
