= Sussex Partnership NHS Foundation Trust =

UK-based mental health and learning disability organization

- Former name: Sussex Partnership NHS Trust
- Established: April 2006
- Headquarters: Swandean, Arundel Road, Worthing, West Sussex, England
- Region served: Brighton & Hove, East Sussex, West Sussex and Hampshire
- Hospitals: Mill View Hospital; Meadowfield Hospital; Langley Green Hospital; Chalkhill Hospital
- Chair: Peter Molyneux
- Chief executive: Dr Jane Padmore
- Website: www.sussexpartnership.nhs.uk

The Sussex Partnership NHS Foundation Trust provides mental health and learning disability services to the people of Brighton & Hove, East Sussex and West Sussex. The trust also provide some community services in Hampshire for children and young people with mental health problem. They work in partnership with those who use their services, with their staff, with NHS and social care agencies and with the voluntary sector.

== History ==
The trust was established as Sussex Partnership NHS Trust in April 2006, and became a NHS Foundation Trust with teaching status in August 2008.

In 2013 the trust set up a joint venture with the company Care UK to purchase a 32-bed rehabilitation unit in Gosport, and to create a 24-bed self-contained accommodation unit later in the year.

The trust was previously cited as one of three large trusts in the South East Coast area which are in competition for new business, the others being Kent and Medway NHS and Social Care Partnership Trust and Surrey and Borders Partnership NHS Foundation Trust.

In December 2014 the trust stopped routine admissions to Langley Green Hospital in Crawley after a Care Quality Commission inspection in February 2014 found it had failed to meet any of the standards it uses to judge performance.

Following a planned inspection of trust services in January 2015, the CQC said it was satisfied with the progress made to improve services at Langley Green. At the time, Sussex Partnership was rated by the CQC as a Trust which 'requires improvement'.

In the CQC report published 23 January 2018, the trust was judged assessed as 'good' overall. It was judged to be 'outstanding' for being caring, and 'good' for being safe, effective, responsive and well-led. The CQC noted:

- "Patients and carers all gave positive feedback about the care they received. They said they were involved in decisions about their care and that staff considered their well-being and experiences as a patient, as well as their physical health needs".
- ‘Outstanding’ examples of practice such as clinical leadership and service user involvement at Langley Green Hospital in Crawley; a focus on improving the safety of older people in hospital in Hove; physical health care support for people using mental health services in Brighton; a mental health drop-in clinic for young people in Hastings; and a suicide awareness campaign for young people in Hampshire.
- A new senior leadership team which has brought an “invigorated and open approach to the direction of the trust and culture in which the staff worked. Staff were excited about the changes and empowered to make improvements to their services. They also felt valued and felt proud to work for the organisation”.

In response to its nurse recruitment campaign, the trust has attracted over 100 new staff to come and work within its services.

In July 2017, the trust published research which showed people who use mental health services in East Surrey and Sussex have a life expectancy which is 20 years less than the general population. The research also showed people who use mental health services comprise about 7% of the local population yet account for 20% of all A&E attendances; an issue which the trust says highlights the need to invest in and improve mental health crisis care.

In December 2017, staff from the trust published a research paper on Recovery Colleges in the Journal of Mental Health which showed:

- Students who attended Recovery College were less likely to need to be admitted to hospital, or treated under Section, and had fewer contacts with community mental health professionals.
- Students used mental health services less after attending courses.
- The reduction in mental health services needed by students who registered for Sussex Recovery College Courses equated to a saving of around £1,200 for the NHS per student per year.

Sussex Recovery College is a joint project between Sussex Partnership NHS Foundation Trust, Southdown Housing Association and local voluntary organisations in East and West Sussex and Brighton & Hove. Courses are co-devised and co- delivered by people with lived experience of mental illness and by mental health professionals.

== Criticism ==
The trust has been criticized for failing to prevent homicides by psychiatric patients in its care. In October 2016 the trust published an independent review, commissioned jointly with NHS England, to review homicides involving patients known to its services

== See also ==
- Healthcare in Sussex
- List of hospitals in England
- List of NHS trusts
