= Brighton and Sussex University Hospitals NHS Trust =

Defunct NHS Trust

- Type: NHS trust
- Established: 1 April 2002
- Disbanded: 1 April 2021
- Hospitals: Princess Royal Hospital; Royal Sussex County Hospital
- Staff: 8,220 FTE (2019/20)

Brighton and Sussex University Hospitals NHS Trust (BSUH) is a disbanded NHS foundation trust in England. It ran two acute hospitals, the Royal Sussex County Hospital in Brighton and the Princess Royal Hospital in Haywards Heath, and a number of other hospitals and medical facilities, including the Royal Alexandra Children's and Sussex Eye Hospitals in Brighton, Hove Polyclinic, the Park Centre for Breast Care at Preston Park and Hurstwood Park Neurosciences Centre in Haywards Heath. The Trust also provided services in Brighton General Hospital, Lewes Victoria Hospital, Bexhill Renal Satellite Unit, Eastbourne District General Hospital and Worthing Hospital.

In July 2020 it announced plans to merge with Western Sussex Hospitals NHS Foundation Trust.

On April 1, 2021, it officially merged to become University Hospitals Sussex NHS Foundation Trust.

== History ==
The trust was established on 1 April 2002 and disbanded on March 31, 2021.

== Development programme ==
The Trust is undergoing a £484.7 million public capital development programme for the modernisation of the Royal Sussex County Hospital, which has the oldest buildings in the NHS still used for acute care. Treasury funding for the redevelopment was approved in May 2014. Laing O'Rourke started work on the project in September 2014 by constructing temporary buildings.

After securing agreement from NHS Improvement, the Trust got planning permission in September 2017 for a £30 million redevelopment of the Royal Sussex County Hospital's A&E department, including a new 70 bed short-stay ward. A new Emergency Ambulatory Care Unit (EACU) opened in March 2018, where medical and surgical teams work alongside each other to treat emergency patients who do not need to stay in overnight.

== Performance ==
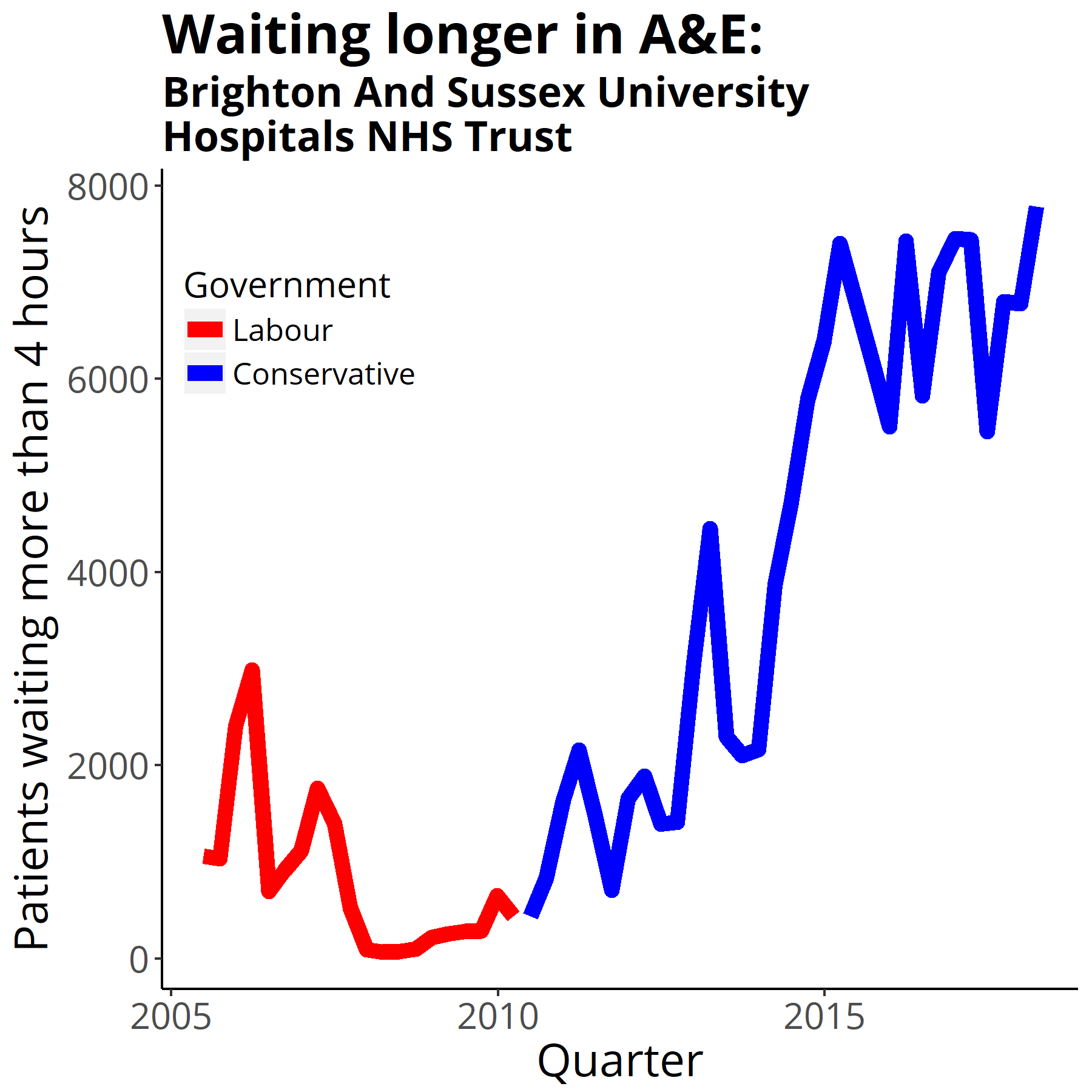
Four-hour target in the emergency department quarterly figures from NHS England Data from https://www.england.nhs.uk/statistics/statistical-work-areas/ae-waiting-times-and-activity/

The Trust suffered several difficult years from 2014 to 2019.

A Care Quality Commission report in 2014, said that accident and emergency services at Royal Sussex County Hospital were inadequate for responsiveness, suffered significant pressures and lacked sufficient physical space to deal with the number of patients that attended. The trust was one of 26 responsible for half of the national growth in patients waiting more than four hours in accident and emergency over the 2014/15 winter.

Following an inspection in April 2016, the Trust was given a formal warning by the Care Quality Commission in June 2016. It was told to improve its risk management as patients were being put at unnecessary risk because they were not being dealt with properly or in appropriate areas, to ensure the care privacy and dignity of people attending hospital and to ensure patients are seen in line with national timescales for diagnosis and treatment. It was put into special measures in October 2016. It had its accreditation suspended by the United Kingdom Accreditation Service in 2016 when staff shortages affected turn round times.

In June 2016, the trust reported a backlog of more than 9,000 patients who had waited more than 18 weeks for treatment in breach of the target, and only 73% of current referrals were seen within the target. It did not expect to hit the target before March 2018.

NHS Improvement removed the existing management and contracted the executive from Western Sussex NHS Foundation Trust to provide leadership to the Trust for three years from April 2017. The Care Quality Commission inspected the Trust's two main hospitals in April 2017, whose ratings improved from Inadequate to Requires Improvement. The CQC said that they had found "significant improvements" across the Trust, but recommended that it stay in special measures. The CQC concluded that "There is no doubt that improvements have been made since our last inspection and that the staff involved in the delivery of that change should be congratulated. However, there remains an extensive programme of change to be delivered in order to attain an overall rating of good."

The CQC found, after inspections in 2018, that "The trust had made huge improvements since the new executive team had introduced improved systems of working. The trust had a new strategy, vision and values which underpinned a culture which was patient centred. The 'Patient First Improvement System' had empowered front line staff by equipping them with the lean tools, methods and a structured process which had helped to build and promote a culture of continuous improvement across the whole trust." The CQC also found that the Trust's leaders "promoted a positive culture that supported and valued staff —There was a significant change in the culture since the last inspection. Bullying and acceptance of poor behaviour was no longer recognised by staff."

In 2019, the trust was taken out of special measures, but there were still concerns about performance against NHS targets. 160 12-hour trolley waits were reported from the A&E department in January and February. 25% of patients waited six weeks or more for diagnostic tests in January. Only 77% against the 95% target of patients were seen within 18 weeks of referral, and only 65.7% of cancer patients started treatment within the six-week target. The trust was planning for a deficit of £53 million on the year. It reported a 30% drop in hip and knee surgery patients in 2018–19, with twice the number of patients in the area choosing private, rather than NHS, providers for NHS-funded hip and knee operations.

In January 2019, the Care Quality Commission (CQC) rated the Trust as "good" overall and scored it as "outstanding" for caring.

In February 2025 Sussex police were considering bringing manslaughter charges over avoidable harm, deaths, and cover-ups in the general surgery and neurosurgery departments; "Operation Bramber" was investigating alleged medical negligence and cover-up between 2015 and 2021, with a reported 200 cases.

== Diversity and discrimination ==
After a history of claims of discrimination at the Trust, the CQC found in its January 2019 report that "Staff felt equality and diversity were promoted in their day today work. We spoke with the newly formed Black and minority ethnicity working group...[who] told us that they had seen a dramatic change...Staff told us that although they had not always felt supported in the past, since the new executive team had arrived they now felt confident that they could raise any concerns about staff behaviours towards them with their line managers, and they felt assured that their concerns would be listened to and acted on appropriately."

== See also ==
- Healthcare in Sussex
- List of hospitals in England
- List of NHS trusts
