= Healthcare in Sussex =

Overview of Healthcare in the English county of Sussex

Healthcare in Sussex is the responsibility of NHS Sussex, an integrated care system and the NHS Sussex Partnership NHS Foundation Trust. Through the Sussex Health and Care Assembly, NHS Sussex works with local government in the county to agree strategic priorities for public healthcare in Sussex.

Before 2022 healthcare provision was the responsibility of seven Clinical Commissioning Groups covering: Brighton and Hove; Coastal West Sussex; Horsham and Mid Sussex; Crawley; Eastbourne Hailsham and Seaford; Hastings and Rother; High Weald; and Lewes-Havens from 2013 to 2020. From April 2020 they were merged into three covering East Sussex, West Sussex, and Brighton and Hove. In 2021 the three Sussex CCGs were merged into one, Sussex CCG. In 2022 Sussex CCG transitioned into an Integrated Care Board or ICB.

== History ==
From 1947 to 1974, NHS services in Sussex were managed by the South-East Metropolitan Regional Hospital Board. In 1965 a new board was formed for Wessex which also covered Dorset apart from Lyme Regis. In 1974 the boards were abolished and replaced by regional health authorities (RHAs). East Sussex came under the South East Thames RHA. West Sussex was under South West Thames RHA. Regions were reorganised in 1996 and the whole of Sussex came under the South Thames Regional Health Authority. East Sussex and West Sussex each had its own area health authority from 1974 until 2000 when they were abolished. The county was divided into district health authorities based in Brighton, Eastbourne and Hastings in the East which were amalgamated in 1994. In the West there were three districts: Chichester; Worthing; and Cuckfield and Crawley: renamed Mid Downs 1982. Regional health authorities were reorganised and renamed strategic health authorities in 2002. The whole county was part of Surrey and Sussex SHA. In 2006 regions were again reorganised and Sussex came under NHS South East Coast until that was abolished in 2013. Ten primary care trusts (PCTs) were created for the area but by 2013 there were only four: Brighton and Hove City PCT; East Sussex Downs and Weald PCT (made by merger of Eastbourne Downs PCT and Sussex Downs and Weald PCT); Hastings and Rother PCT (made by merger of Hastings and St Leonards PCT and Bexhill and Rother PCT); West Sussex PCT (made by merger of Adur, Arun and Worthing PCT, Western Sussex PCT, Horsham and Chanctonbury PCT, Crawley PCT, and Mid-Sussex PCT).

The CCGs took on the responsibilities of the former PCTs in April 2013.

== Sustainability and transformation plans ==
East Surrey and Sussex formed a sustainability and transformation plan area in March 2016 with Michael Wilson, the Chief Executive of Surrey and Sussex Healthcare NHS Trust as its leader. The plans aim to eliminate a projected 2020/21 deficit of £864 million.

The plans were criticised by the Care Quality Commission in 2018 as it had not started to function properly “due to a lack of investment and infrastructure”. The former NHS Improvement deputy chief executive Bob Alexander was appointed as chair in October 2017.

== Commissioning ==
The contract for care and support at home in Chichester, worth £275 million, was the biggest tender offered by the NHS in 2015.

In March 2017 Coastal West Sussex CCG was placed under legal directions by NHS England after “serious performance, planning, financial and leadership weaknesses” and an overspend of £27 million were discovered.

The Central Sussex Commissioning Alliance, consisting of the CCGs of Brighton and Hove, High Weald Lewes Havens, Crawley, and Horsham and Mid Sussex will start in January 2018, with the 4 CCGs sharing an accountable officer. In March 2018 at the request of NHS England Adam Doyle, the accountable officer of the alliance was appointed accountable officer for Coastal West Sussex CCG, which will not join the alliance, and East Surrey CCG, which joins the alliance on 1 April.

In 2019 it was proposed to merge the seven clinical commissioning groups into three, matching the local authority boundaries.

== Primary care ==
There are separate local medical committees for East and West Sussex.

Out-of-hours services are provided by IC24.

The Sussex Medical Centre in Brighton is a private health provider which also provides NHS funded services, particularly in urology and weight management.

13 GP practices in Brighton and Hove closed between 2016 and 2019.

=== Here ===
Here, known as Brighton and Hove Integrated Care Service prior to 2016, is a not-for-profit social enterprise and GP Federation based in Brighton.

The service commissioned Age UK and Brighton and Hove Impetus in 2014 to recruit 60 volunteers to work in GP surgeries to ease the pressure in their surgeries and keep people out of hospital. The project – known as EPIC (Extended Primary Integrated Care) – also uses nurses and pharmacists to deal with minor ailments and medicine reviews.

In 2015, Brighton and Hove Integrated Care Service won a contract for dermatology services from Brighton and Hove Clinical Commissioning Group – a service which they had been providing since 2010 - but had to withdraw when it could not reach agreement with its proposed subcontractors.

== Secondary care ==
The main providers of acute care in the county are Brighton and Sussex University Hospitals NHS Trust (BSUH), East Sussex Healthcare NHS Trust (ESHT), Surrey and Sussex Healthcare NHS Trust (SASH) and Western Sussex Hospitals NHS Foundation Trust (WSHT). The two largest trusts, BSUH and WSHT, are merging into one NHS University Foundation Trust from April 2021, with the Queen Victoria Hospital joining this new trust from SASH.

Nuffield Health runs Brighton Private Hospital and Spire Healthcare runs Sussex Hospital in East Sussex and the Montefiore Hospital in Hove.

The three East Sussex clinical commissioning groups – Eastbourne, Hailsham and Seaford; Hastings and Rother; and High Weald Lewes Havens – agreed in June 2014 to permanently centralise obstetrics and overnight paediatrics at the Conquest Hospital in Hastings.

Proposals to transfer musculoskeletal services in West Sussex to Bupa CSH - a partnership between Bupa and Central Surrey Health were abandoned in January 2015 when it was concluded that trauma services at Western Sussex Hospitals NHS Foundation Trust would become unviable if the deal went ahead.

The leaders of East Sussex Healthcare NHS Trust were urged to resign by the East Sussex County Council health overview and scrutiny committee and by Hastings Borough Council after a damning Care Quality Commission report in March 2015. Sussex Community NHS Trust were given the contract for minor injuries units and district nurses across East Sussex from November 2015.

Patient Transport Services were contracted to Coperforma, a private company based in Andover from April 2016. It uses subcontractors to take non-urgent patients to and from hospitals, and there have been complaints about the operation. One of the contractors, VM Langfords, went into liquidation and some of its ambulances were repossessed. In March 2019 Coperforma went bankrupt, owing the clinical commissioning groups £11.3 million. Patient transport services were returned to the South Central Ambulance Service NHS Foundation Trust.

Stroke services in West Sussex are provided in both Worthing and Chichester hospitals. NHS England want to see them centralised on one site.

== Mental health ==
The main provider of Mental Health Services is Sussex Partnership NHS Foundation Trust.

== Community services ==
Sussex Community NHS Trust was established as a result of the Transforming Community Services programme in 2012.

The Sussex Musculoskeletal Partnership is made up of Surrey and Sussex Healthcare NHS Trust, Brighton and Hove Integrated Care Service, Horder Healthcare and Sussex Partnership NHS Foundation Trust. In May 2014 the consortium won a five-year musculoskeletal contract worth £210m from Brighton and Hove, Crawley and Horsham and Mid Sussex clinical commissioning groups.

Palliative care is provided by St. Catherine's Hospice.

Procare Health Limited, the local GP Federation and the Royal Surrey County Hospital NHS Foundation Trust took over adult community health services in the Guildford and Waverley area in 2018, where adult community health services had previously been run by Virgin Care.

== HealthWatch ==
Healthwatch is an organisation set up under the Health and Social Care Act 2012 to act as a voice for patients. There are three separate local Healthwatches in the county covering East Sussex, West Sussex and Brighton and Hove.

== See also ==
- Category:Health in Sussex
- Healthcare in the United Kingdom
