= Royal Surrey County Hospital =

English hospital

- Royal Surrey County Hospital NHS Foundation Trust
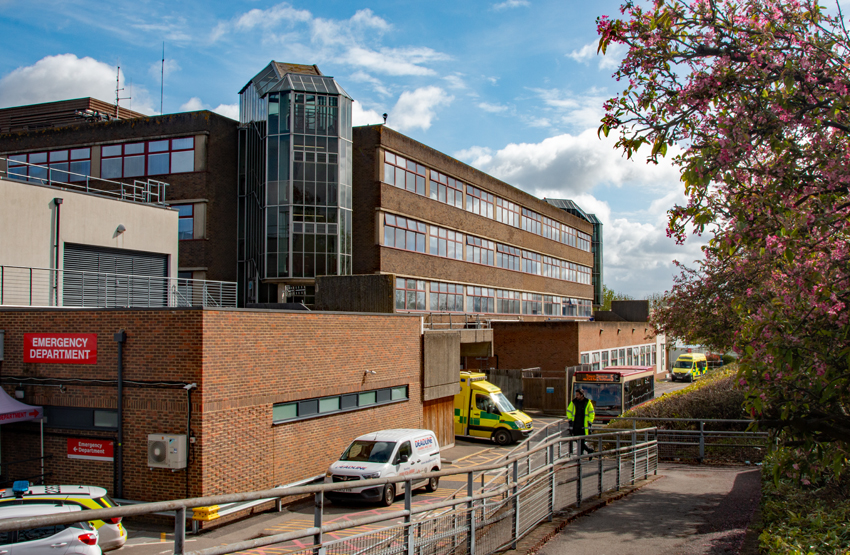
- Royal Surrey County Hospital

- Shown in Surrey

Geography
- Location: Egerton Road, Guildford, Surrey, England
- Coordinates: 51°14′26″N 0°36′34″W

Organisation
- Care system: NHS
- Type: District General

Services
- Emergency department: Yes
- Beds: 571

History
- Founded: 1863

Links
- Website: www.royalsurrey.nhs.uk
- Lists: Hospitals in England

The Royal Surrey County Hospital (RSCH) is a 520-bed district general hospital, located on the fringe of Guildford, run by the Royal Surrey County Hospital NHS Foundation Trust. Royal Surrey has received excellent recognition by the Care Quality Commission (CQC), with both Royal Surrey County Hospital and their maternity services rated outstanding.

== History ==
The hospital has its origins in a facility at Farnham Road which opened in 1866. Before that there had been a dispensary, catering for the poor of Guildford, in a 16th century house in Quarry street from 1859 to 1866. The hospital moved to Egerton Road in Guildford and opened on 16 October 1978 as the Guildford District Hospital. The new hospital was officially opened by Elizabeth II in February 1981; following the closure of St Luke's Hospital, she returned to open the St Luke's Wing at the Royal Surrey County Hospital in February 1997. A successful campaign to save the Royal Surrey County Hospital from closure was launched in October 2006.

== Facilities ==
It serves a population of 330,000 for general services and up to 2 million for cancer services. The Royal Surrey is also a specialist centre for diabetes, ENT and maxillo facial surgery. It is situated close to the University of Surrey's Manor Park campus, allowing it to offer opportunities for research and pioneering treatments such as fibroid embolisation, brachytherapy and minimal access surgery.

The Royal Surrey County Hospital was one of the first NHS Trusts in 1991. It treats around 500,000 patients a year – 74,000 accident and emergency, 90,000 in-patients and day-patients and 336,000 outpatients.

The Trust has 20 wards comprising general and specialist surgery, obstetrics, paediatrics, oncology, orthopaedics, general and specialist medicine, intensive care and coronary care, with 527 beds in total. There are 13 dedicated surgical theatres, one obstetric and one minor operations theatre and state of the art outpatient, audiology and rehabilitation departments.

The trust has an aseptics unit which manufactures radiopharmaceuticals and other medication. It is licensed by the Medicines and Healthcare products Regulatory Agency. After the agency raised concerns about staffing, quality systems and documentation, production was suspended in November 2019.

Guildford and Waverley Clinical Commissioning Group organised a programme of in-reach GPs in 2015, where GPs were placed in wards of the hospital reviewing patients who had been admitted and advising on possibilities for discharge.

In 2017, work started on a new £4 million urology department in conjunction with the Prostate Project.

In 2020, in response to the COVID-19 pandemic, the trust built a 20 bed isolation ward in record time.

In 2026, a Cancer and Surgical Innovation Centre (CASIC) was opened on a site south of the main buildings. It houses six new operating theatres, a recovery area, a post-anaesthetic care unit, and a 24-bed short-stay ward.

== Popular culture ==
The Royal Surrey County Hospital was the inspiration for the PC game Theme Hospital by the local software house Bullfrog.

== See also ==
- List of hospitals in England
- List of NHS trusts
