= Worthing Hospital =

- University Hospitals Sussex NHS Foundation Trust
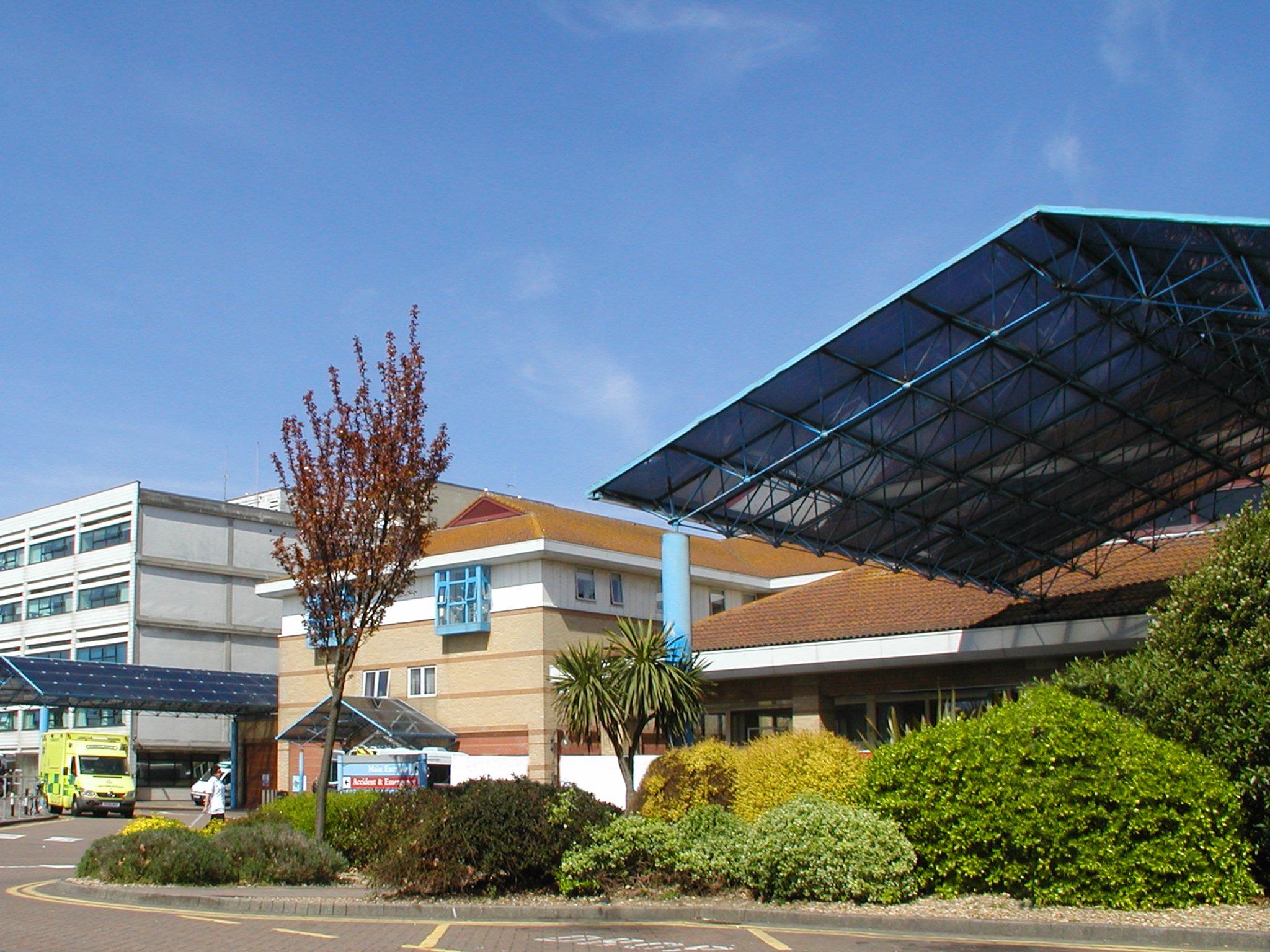
- Worthing Hospital

- Shown in West Sussex

Geography
- Location: Worthing, West Sussex, England
- Coordinates: 50.8168°N 0.3643°W

Organisation
- Care system: NHS
- Type: District General

Services
- Emergency department: Yes
- Beds: approx 500

History
- Founded: 1829

Links
- Website: www.uhsussex.nhs.uk/hospitals/worthing-hospital

Worthing Hospital is a medium-sized District General Hospital (DGH) located in Worthing, West Sussex, England. It is managed by University Hospitals Sussex NHS Foundation Trust.

== History ==
Worthing's first hospital was a dispensary created in 1829 in Ann Street. A new dispensary was set up in 1845 in Chapel Road, which when enlarged in 1860 became known as the Worthing Infirmary and Dispensary. The Worthing Infirmary and Dispensary moved to the current site in Lyndhurst Road in 1882 and was given the name Worthing Hospital in 1902. The new East Wing was opened by Princess Anne in 1998.

After concerns were raised that the hospital could lose some of its services, a series of marches and protest events were held in both Worthing and Chichester against the plans to downsize facilities. In May 2008, the West Sussex Primary Care Trust Board recommended that Worthing Hospital be the 'major general hospital' for West Sussex and that St Richard's Hospital in Chichester be downgraded.

In 2016 Western Sussex Hospitals NHS Foundation Trust (WSHFT) was rated as 'Outstanding' by the Care Quality Commission (CQC).

Marianne Griffiths, the Chief Executive, was named chief executive of the year at the Health Service Journal awards in November 2016, and the top chief executive 2018 and again in 2019.

In 2019 Marianne Griffiths was made Dame Commander of the Order of the British Empire.

In April 2021 WSHFT (of which Worthing Hospital was formerly a part) and BSUH (Brighton and Sussex University Hospitals Trust) merged to become University Sussex Hospitals NHS Foundation Trust.

== See also ==
- Healthcare in Sussex
- List of hospitals in England
- Swandean Isolation Hospital
