= Healthcare in Yorkshire =

Healthcare in Yorkshire from 2016 was the responsibility of 19 clinical commissioning groups, which were replaced by integrated care systems in July 2022.

== History ==
From 1947 to 1974 NHS services in Yorkshire were managed by the Leeds and Sheffield regional hospital boards. In 1974 the boards were abolished and replaced by regional health authorities. Yorkshire came under the Leeds and Sheffield RHAs. Regions were reorganised in 1996 and most of Yorkshire came under the Yorkshire Regional Health Authority. South Yorkshire was under the Trent Regional Health Authority. In 1994 the Yorkshire RHA merged into Northern and Yorkshire. Yorkshire from 1974 had 17 district health authorities. Barnsley, Sheffield and Rotherham each had their own DHA. In 1994 the 17 in Yorkshire were merged into seven: Bradford, East Riding, Grimsby and Scunthorpe, Leeds, North Yorkshire, Wakefield, and West Yorkshire. Thirteen primary care trusts were established covering the whole of the county in 2002. They were managed by three strategic health authorities: West Yorkshire, South Yorkshire, and North and East Yorkshire and Northern Lincolnshire. They were merged into one, Yorkshire and the Humber, in 2006.

The CCGs took on the responsibilities of the former PCTs on 1 April 2013. As of 2016, the CCGs were:

- Airedale, Wharfedale and Craven
- Barnsley
- Bradford City
- Bradford Districts
- Calderdale
- Doncaster
- East Riding of Yorkshire
- Greater Huddersfield
- Hambleton, Richmondshire and Whitby
- Harrogate and Rural District
- Hull
- Leeds
- North Kirklees
- Rotherham
- Sheffield
- Vale of York
- Wakefield

Subsequently, there were a series of amalgamations.

== Sustainability and transformation plans ==
There are three sustainability and transformation plans for the county:

- West Yorkshire formed a sustainability and transformation plan area in March 2016 with Rob Webster, the Chief Executive designate of South West Yorkshire Partnership NHS Foundation Trust as its leader. It intends tackle the projected deficit of £1.07 billion by 2020/21. Councillor Peter Gruen, chair of the Leeds Health Scrutiny Board, expressed concern about the West Yorkshire and Harrogate Sustainability and transformation plan, which in January 2017 had not been published. He said current efforts focused too much on short-term solutions and were failing to address the root causes. It hopes to save £50 million a year by standardising policies in elective care, starting with elective orthopaedics and ophthalmology, as the existing 11 CCGs policies vary widely. It is to be known at the West Yorkshire and Harrogate Health and Care Partnership, and in February 2018 it was planning a formal governance and accountability structure and setting up 50 integrated neighbourhood teams providing community, primary, mental health and social care for populations of 30,000-50,000. The West Yorkshire and Harrogate sustainability and transformation partnership was one of four new integrated care systems established by NHS England in May 2018.
- South Yorkshire and Bassetlaw formed a separate sustainability and transformation plan area with Sir Andrew Cash OBE, the Chief Executive of Sheffield Teaching Hospitals NHS Foundation Trust as its leader. The deficit here is £571 million and it is proposed to tackle it by developing accountable care organisations. The South Yorkshire and Bassetlaw Integrated Care System, as it is now called, was one of the biggest beneficiaries of Boris Johnson's announcement of capital funding for the NHS in August 2019, with an allocation of £57.5 million for investment in primary care.
- The East Yorkshire area of Coast, Humber and Vale will be another sustainability and transformation plan area. It has a deficit of £420 million. It proposed to set up "new integrated multi-disciplinary locality teams" leading to a re-configuration of community care.

== Commissioning ==
The Vale of York CCG was put in special measures after it forecast a £6.3 million deficit in 2015-16. Non-elective admissions at York Teaching Hospital NHS Foundation Trust were 14% more than planned and emergency department attendances 17% more. There have been ongoing financial problems in York since the year 2000.

Harrogate and Rural District CCG decided in October 2016 that anyone who smoked or had a Body Mass Index of more than 30 would be referred to a weight management or smoking cessation service for six months before they would be considered for elective surgery. Ian Eardley of the Royal College of Surgeons said, "The policies for smokers and overweight patients that Harrogate and Rural District CCG intend to impose ignore the public outcry that surrounded similar plans."

North Kirklees and Greater Huddersfield CCGs decided in January 2017 that they would stop most individual funding requests, and stop prescribing gluten-free products, sunscreens and multivitamins, hoping to save £750,000 over the next 18 months. The two CCGs started sharing the same chief officer, Carol McKenna, in October 2017. They were already sharing some other staff.

The three CCGs in Leeds West, Leeds North, and Leeds South and East, with a joint population of 860,000 and more than 100 GP practices merged in April 2018. In 2020 they initiated an innovative advertising campaign with temperature-triggered advertising on bus shelters, urging people to safeguard their health with different messages for different temperatures.

== Primary care ==
Out-of-hours services are provided by Humber Teaching NHS Foundation Trust (York), Yorkshire Doctors Urgent Care, Care UK (Rotherham), Yorkshire Ambulance Service, Local Care Direct (West Yorkshire and Craven), Nestor Primecare Services Limited (Hambleton, Richmondshire and Whitby). West Wakefield Health and Wellbeing Ltd is a Multispecialty community provider established in 2015.

In January 2017 the clinical commissioning groups in Leeds agreed to suspend 80% of the Quality and Outcomes Framework targets for the rest of 2016/17. A similar strategy was adopted by NHS Wales.

The Haxby Group, which operates from 11 sites in York and Hull, with a list of 60,000 patients was rated outstanding and praised for building multidisciplinary teams by the Care Quality Commission in 2019.

== Community care ==
Leeds Community Healthcare NHS Trust and Locala are NHS providers of community services. Humber NHS Foundation Trust won a contract for community and out of hours services in Whitby in March 2016 after there were problems with a bid from Virgin Care. The 7-year contract is worth £45 million.

Wakefield - Connecting Care, one of the NHS England Vanguard projects has established a team of clinicians, community and social care staff to provide care to elderly people in care homes and supported housing which has reduced emergency admissions by 27%.

== Mental health services ==
Mental health services in the county are provided by Bradford District Care NHS Foundation Trust, Humber NHS Foundation Trust, Leeds and York Partnership NHS Foundation Trust, Rotherham Doncaster and South Humber NHS Foundation Trust, South West Yorkshire Partnership NHS Foundation Trust, and Tees, Esk and Wear Valleys NHS Foundation Trust.

Bradford District Care NHS Foundation Trust, Leeds and York Partnership NHS Foundation Trust, Leeds Community Healthcare NHS Trust and South West Yorkshire Partnership NHS Foundation Trust agreed to form the West Yorkshire Mental Health Services Collaborative in April 2018. It hoped to eliminate non-specialist out-of-area placements within 12 months, reduce unnecessary emergency attendances by 40%, and form a single acute bed base for the region with a single bed management function.

== Acute hospitals ==
Acute hospital services are provided by:

- Airedale NHS Foundation Trust
- Barnsley Hospital NHS Foundation Trust
- Bradford Teaching Hospitals NHS Foundation Trust
- Calderdale and Huddersfield NHS Foundation Trust
- Doncaster and Bassetlaw Teaching Hospitals NHS Foundation Trust
- Harrogate and District NHS Foundation Trust
- Hull University Teaching Hospitals NHS Trust
- Leeds Teaching Hospitals NHS Trust
- Mid Yorkshire Hospitals NHS Trust
- Rotherham NHS Foundation Trust
- Sheffield Teaching Hospitals NHS Foundation Trust
- Sheffield Children's NHS Foundation Trust
- York Teaching Hospital NHS Foundation Trust.

The Yorkshire Ambulance Service covers the county.

The Working Together vanguard established in 2016 includes Barnsley Hospital NHS Foundation Trust, Sheffield Teaching Hospitals NHS Foundation Trust, Sheffield Children's NHS Foundation Trust, Rotherham NHS Foundation Trust, Doncaster and Bassetlaw Teaching Hospitals NHS Foundation Trust, Mid Yorkshire Hospitals NHS Trust and also Chesterfield Royal Hospital NHS Foundation Trust. It has established a federation board which will make decisions about services ceded under delegated authority. It is chaired by Sir Andrew Cash.

The West Yorkshire Association of Acute Trusts (WYAAT) was established in 2016 as "an innovative provider collaborative which brings together six NHS trusts across West Yorkshire and Harrogate to deliver joined up acute hospital services". It is made up of the Airedale, Bradford, Calderdale & Huddersfield, Harrogate & District, Leeds Teaching Hospitals and Mid Yorkshire Teaching trusts.

It was agreed in 2019 that the acute stroke services in Rotherham and Barnsley would close, and services would be concentrated in Sheffield, Doncaster and Wakefield.

The Vale of York CCG set up a randomised control trial with Health Navigator which used artificial intelligence to identify patients at high risk of unplanned hospital attendance. They were given a referral to the company’s ‘Pro-active Health Coaching’ service. There was a 36% reduction in A&E attendances among those supported. In 2019 the service was extended to 1,800 patients.

North Yorkshire County Council and City of York Council sponsored an expansion of the CareRooms scheme in Selby and York in 2021 to help people recover after being discharged from hospital. Tele-care and monitoring equipment is fitted in the rooms to ensure guests vital signs are checked and there is 24-hour video access to a GP service. It was said to make use of the "resources that exist within local communities" in a report proposing further expansion to Richmond, Scarborough and Whitby.
