= Five Year Forward View =

English NHS plan

The Five Year Forward View was produced by NHS England in October 2014 under the leadership of Simon Stevens as a planning document.

== Publication and reception ==
It received praise for brevity, being only 39 pages, and lacking the illustrations which had graced its predecessors. Like the NHS Plan 2000 with which Stevens was also associated it was supported by the great and good of the NHS, but in this case it was regulators - Monitor, the Care Quality Commission and the like, rather than the Royal Colleges and Trades Unions of the earlier plan. This new national leadership of the NHS issues an unprecedented warning to politicians, none of whom are included in the endorsements, that it cannot continue at current funding levels, and additional resources worth more than 1.5 per cent a year in real terms will be required.

No more top-down reorganisation was proposed, but instead the development of new models to suit local needs, something quite radical for the NHS, which is accustomed to the imposition of uniformity regardless of local conditions. It seeks to break away from Enoch Powell's 1962 Hospital Plan for England and Wales which established the district general hospital as the central pillar of British healthcare. Even more radical is the proposal to erode the distinction between hospital consultants and General practitioners, encouraging hospitals to employ GPs - a distinction which has lasted in the UK for more than a century - and permit the development of "Accountable Care Organisations" similar to those in Spain and parts of the United States. There is much stress on the fact that 70% of the NHS budget is spent on the management of the 15 million people with long term conditions. Two new models of care – multispecialty community providers, and primary and acute care systems – involve integrating primary care and hospital care in a single provider organisation.

The fact that the word “competition” does not appear once in the document was hailed as a victory by Labour.

Stevens said that the health service would have to break out of its “narrow confines” and promote healthy lifestyles. Employers are key to promoting better health in the population and there should be incentives to encourage participation in Weight Watchers-type schemes. The plan includes a focus on the health of NHS staff, saying that three quarters of hospitals fail to make available nutritious food for nurses and other workers on night shifts. Stevens said NHS staff should set an example by leading healthier lifestyles as part of a drive to improve the health of the nation. He pledged to get junk food out of hospital canteens.

The plan also pays far more attention to the potential for technological innovation using the internet and mobile phone and apps than any previous NHS document. Technology, it envisages, will enable self-management, integration and patient centred care. This has already been done by the Modality Partnership which is given a favourable mention in the document. It already conducts 75 per cent of consultations remotely using phone or Skype. Patients have an electronic care plan they can manage themselves, and digital access to consultant advice.

According to Nick Timmins it is the first NHS document he could recall that said NHS structures did not have to be the same everywhere.

=== Next steps ===
This document, published in March 2017, outlined progress since 2015 and priorities for the next two years. Containing the growth in A&E admissions and bed days is to be a priority. GP practices are to be organised into area hubs covering populations of up to 50,000. At least 150 new inpatient beds for children and young people with mental health problems are to be provided. There will be reforms to increase the number of nurses and reforms to enable more flexible working.

== Finance ==
Its claims that the NHS could deliver £22bn of annual savings in 5 years’ time, is the latest of a long line of reports to assert that there is scope for the NHS to make major savings, but the report does make it clear that more resources, an extra £8bn in Government funding by 2020 would be needed. It claimed that there would be a "radical upgrade in prevention and public health", but as Dr Sarah Wollaston pointed out in October 2016 there were reductions in other areas of health spending outside NHS England's budget, in particular public health. Without improvements in social care she said the NHS could not be expected to deliver the Five Year Forward View.

NHS efficiency savings of 2% to 3% a year from 2015 to 2021 were supposed to save £22 billion a year. Between 2004 and 2014 NHS output increased considerably. Hospital admissions increased by 32%, outpatient attendances by 17%, primary care consultations by 25% and community care activity by 14%. Hospital death rates reduced, especially in stroke. At the same time there was an increase in wages of 24% and an increase of 10% in the number of staff and increases in the use of equipment and supplies. As a whole NHS output increased by 47% and inputs by 31%, an increase in productivity of 12.86% during the period, or 1.37% per year, considerably less than envisaged in the Five Year Forward View.

== Vanguard areas ==
29 areas were selected (from 269 applicants) to pilot new models for localised healthcare in March 2015. When insufficient transformation funding was allocated in September 2016 the plans were scaled down.

Proposals for companies to run primary and acute care systems or multispecialty community providers appear to have been prevented because they would be liable for VAT.

In the 12 months to September 2017, compared to the 2014–15 financial year, there was a reduction in the rate of hospital bed days per 1,000 population - for Primary and acute care systems 0.5%, for Multispecialty community providers 1.5%, and for the rest of England 1.3%. Both MCPs and PACS saw substantially slower growth in the rate of emergency admissions per 1,000 population than the rest of England. Growth for MCPs was 2.6% and for PACS the figure was 1.2%. In the rest of England it was 4.9%.

In order to ensure the knowledge from the new models of care was captured and shared throughout the health and care system, the national new care models programme established the FutureNHS collaboration platform, built on the Kahootz collaboration software.

An evaluation study of the platform estimated that it has saved the NHS £3.5 million within its first year in 2017.

=== Primary and acute care systems ===
Integrated primary and acute care systems will bring together GPs, hospital, community and mental health services. Money will be directed from a joint budget to wherever patients are judged to need it most:

- Wirral Partners
- Mid Nottinghamshire Better Together
- Northumbria: Northumberland Accountable Care Organisation
- Yeovil: South Somerset Symphony Programme
- Salford: Salford Royal NHS Foundation Trust - Salford Together
- Lancashire North and Cumbria: Better Care Together
- North East Hampshire and Farnham: Happy Healthy at Home has enrolled 250 students on 'recovery college' courses, designed to help them manage long-term conditions, and opened a healthy living pharmacy.
- Harrogate
- Isle of Wight: My Life a Full Life

=== Multispecialty community providers ===
Multispecialty community providers are supposed to bring specialist services, like chemotherapy and dialysis, out of the hospital and closer to people's homes. They were described as a "political vanity project" in April 2017 by Dr Tom Coffey, who is NHS England London clinical director of emergency care. NHS England announced three potential routes for MCP contracts in July 2016:

- an alliance contract between various providers;
- a “partially integrated” contract – where GPs will be able to retain their general medical services contract alongside the MCP contract;
- a “fully integrated model” – a “hybrid” of the standard NHS contract and a contract for primary medical services.

By August 2017 some of these providers appeared to be merging into the proposed accountable care systems.

Approved proposals:

- Fylde Coast: £4.26m will extend the Extensive Care service for elderly and frail patients with two or more long-term conditions, and establish a single point of contact for all out-of-hospital services.
- Calderdale Health and Social Care Economy
- Wellbeing Erewash
- Modality Birmingham and Sandwell
- West Wakefield Health and Wellbeing Ltd
- All Together Better Sunderland
- Stockport Together
- Dudley: All Together Better Dudley has set up 46 new multidisciplinary community teams. An organisation has been established from a consortium of four NHS trusts and 38 local GP practices which will manage a single, whole population budget for about 300,000 people. It will provide community-based physical health for adults and children, some outpatient services, primary medical services, mental health services, public health, learning disabilities services, urgent care centres and GP out-of-hours care. Adult social care services will be introduced at a later stage of the 15-year contract.
- Whitstable: Whitstable Medical Practice - Encompass
- Tower Hamlets Together
- Southern Hampshire: Southern Health NHS Foundation Trust - Better Local Care has screened patient records to identify poorly controlled asthma.
- West Cheshire Way
- Northamptonshire: Lakeside Healthcare
- Rushcliffe: Principia Partners in Health has set up a specialist nursing team to work in local GP surgeries to administer osteoporosis medication intravenously.

=== Enhanced health in social care ===
Models of enhanced health in care homes will enable the NHS and councils to work together to provide more healthcare in care homes, and to provide better preventive services there:

- East and North Hertfordshire CCGs are allocating GPs and pharmacists to local care homes.
- Nottingham
- Sutton Homes of Care
- Airedale & Partners
- Wakefield - Connecting Care
- Gateshead

=== Urgent and emergency care ===
Development of the NHS 111 is a central issue for most of these projects. It's intended that it should meet all urgent clinical needs rather than just be a signposting service so that appointments could be made directly with GPs or rapid access mental health services.

A further wave of 8 new sites were announced in July 2015:

- Greater Nottingham System Resilience Group, which includes Nottingham University Hospitals NHS Trust, South Nottingham and Erewash Clinical commissioning groups, Nottingham City and County councils, and East Midlands Ambulance Service.
- Cambridgeshire and Peterborough Clinical commissioning group.
- North East Urgent Care Network is bringing both pharmacists and paramedics into primary care settings.
- Barking and Dagenham, Havering and Redbridge System Resilience Group is developing shared patient records.
- West Yorkshire Urgent and Emergency Care Network.
- Leicester, Leicestershire and Rutland System Resilience Group.
- Solihull Together for Better Lives, which includes Heart of England NHS Foundation Trust, Birmingham and Solihull Mental Health NHS Foundation Trust, Solihull Metropolitan Borough Council, and Solihull Clinical commissioning group, is creating multidisciplinary teams to deliver services in patients homes.
- South Devon and Torbay System Resilience Group – led by South Devon and Torbay Clinical commissioning groups, South Devon Healthcare NHS Foundation Trust, and Torbay and Southern Devon Health and Care NHS Trust plans to open two new urgent care centres.

=== Future models of acute care ===
==== Multi-hospital chains ====
- Salford Royal NHS Foundation Trust and Wrightington, Wigan and Leigh foundation group
- Northumbria Healthcare foundation group
- Royal Free London NHS Foundation Trust

==== Multi-site specialty franchises ====
- Dartford and Gravesham and Guy's and St Thomas' Foundation Healthcare Group
- Moorfields Eye Hospital NHS Foundation Trust
- National Orthopaedic Alliance: Robert Jones and Agnes Hunt Orthopaedic Hospital NHS Foundation Trust, Royal National Orthopaedic Hospital NHS Trust and Royal Orthopaedic Hospital NHS Foundation Trust
- Neuro Network: Walton Centre NHS Foundation Trust, Warrington and Halton Hospitals NHS Foundation Trust, Liverpool and Warrington Clinical Commissioning Groups and NHS England Specialised Services Commissioning Team (North).

==== Accountable clinical networks ====
- MERIT – The Mental Alliance for Excellence, Resilience, Innovation and Training: Birmingham and Solihull Mental Health NHS Foundation Trust, Black Country Partnership NHS Foundation Trust, Dudley and Walsall Mental Health Partnership NHS Trust and Coventry and Warwickshire Partnership NHS Trust
- Cheshire and Merseyside Women's and Children's Services
- Royal Marsden NHS Foundation Trust, The Christie Hospital NHS Foundation Trust and University College London Hospitals NHS Foundation Trust - Accountable Clinical Network for Cancer
- EMRAD - East Midlands Radiology Consortium
- Developing One NHS in Dorset: Dorset County Hospital NHS Foundation Trust, Poole Hospital NHS Foundation Trust, Royal Bournemouth and Christchurch Hospitals NHS Foundation Trust
- Working Together Partnership - South Yorkshire, Mid Yorkshire and North Derbyshire

== Sustainability and transformation plans ==
In February 2016 NHS organisations in England, both Clinical Commissioning Groups and NHS trusts, were grouped into 44 footprints which were each required to produce joint plans with their local authorities for health and health service transformation for the period up to 2020. Each had a leader, some from the NHS and some from local authorities.

See Sustainability and transformation plan.

== See also ==
- NHS Long Term Plan
- NHS Plan 2000
