= Healthcare in West Midlands =

Healthcare in the West Midlands has been the responsibility of three integrated care boards (ICBs) since July 2022. These replaced the former clinical commissioning groups (CCGs) of Birmingham and Solihull, Coventry and Warwickshire, Sandwell and West Birmingham, Dudley, Wolverhampton, and Walsall.

The ICBs cover the ceremonial county of the West Midlands, which comprises the areas governed by multiple local authorities.

Name	Local authority areas covered
NHS Birmingham and Solihull Integrated Care Board	Birmingham and Solihull
NHS Black Country Integrated Care Board	Dudley, Sandwell, Walsall, and Wolverhampton
NHS Coventry and Warwickshire Integrated Care Board	Coventry, North Warwickshire, Nuneaton and Bedworth, Rugby, Stratford-on-Avon, and Warwick

== History ==
From 1947 to 1974 NHS services in the West Midlands were managed by the Birmingham Regional Hospital Board. In 1974 the boards were abolished and replaced by regional health authorities. The West Midlands still came under the Birmingham RHA. Regions were reorganised in 1996 and the area came under the West Midlands Regional Health Authority. From 1974 there were six area health authorities covering North, South, East, West and Central Birmingham, together with authorities covering Dudley, Sandwell, Coventry, Solihull, Walsall and Wolverhampton. There were seven district health authorities, one covering each borough. In 1992-4 Birmingham was reorganised into North and South districts. Thirteen primary care trusts were established in the county in 2002: Coventry Teaching PCT, Eastern Birmingham PCT, North Birmingham PCT, Heart of Birmingham Teaching PCT, Solihull Care Trust, South Birmingham PCT, Dudley Beacon & Castle PCT and Dudley South PCT, Oldbury & Smethwick PCT, Rowley Regis & Tipton PCT and Wednesbury & West Bromwich PCT, Walsall Teaching PCT and Wolverhampton City PCT. They were merged into nine in 2006. They were managed by the Birmingham and The Black Country Strategic Health Authority (apart from Coventry, which was under West Midlands South). From 2006 they were all managed by NHS West Midlands.

As of September 2020, all the executive directors at the five NHS trusts in Birmingham are white. Neither University Hospitals Birmingham NHS Foundation Trust nor the Royal Orthopaedic Hospital have had a director who was not white in the last 20 years though more than 40% of the city's population is from a black, Asian or ethnic minority background.

== Sustainability and transformation plans ==
In March 2016 Mark Rogers, Chief Executive of Birmingham City Council was appointed the leader of the Birmingham and Solihull Sustainability and transformation plan footprint. Andy Williams, the Accountable Officer of Sandwell West Birmingham CCG, was appointed the leader of the Black Country STP, and Andy Hardy, the Chief Executive of University Hospitals Coventry and Warwickshire NHS Trust the leader of the Coventry and Warwickshire STP.

The plans for Birmingham and Solihull involved the development of four or five urgent care centres/integrated service hubs and moving GPs into A&E units. In Coventry and Warwickshire a new Acute Stroke Unit would be established at University Hospital Coventry and the partnership was expected to become an accountable care system during 2017.

The Modality Partnership signed a memorandum of understanding with Sandwell and West Birmingham Hospitals NHS Trust in January 2018 which was part of a plan to establish an accountable care system in Sandwell and west Birmingham by April 2019. The Black Country and West Birmingham Integrated Care System planned in 2022 to introduce its shared care record working with Graphnet Health. This covers 1.5 million residents across Wolverhampton, Walsall, Dudley, Sandwell and West Birmingham.

== Commissioning ==
The clinical commissioning groups took on the responsibilities of the former PCTs on 1 April 2013. Birmingham CrossCity, South Central and Solihull CCGs merged in April 2018 to become NHS Birmingham and Solihull CCG. The merged organisation was the largest CCG in England, covering a population of 1.3 million with a budget of £1.7 billion. The CCGs of Coventry and Rugby, Warwickshire North, and South Warwickshire agreed to merge by 2020.

The Care Quality Commission after a review in January 2018 found that there was no "single, coherent strategy for Birmingham which could be clearly articulated by middle management and frontline staff" and that the "governance arrangements had an organisational rather than system focus."

== Urgent care ==
Out-of-hours services were provided by Birmingham & District General Practitioner Emergency Rooms in Birmingham, Solihull and Walsall. Nestor Primecare Services Limited provides these services in Dudley, Sandwell, Heart of Birmingham, South Birmingham and Wolverhampton. Integrated NHS 111 access and Out of Hours were set up in November 2017, designed to bring closer working relationships between the urgent care system, the GP out of hours services, social care, the ambulance service and the NHS 111 service. Worcestershire and Warwickshire Out of Hours services are to be delivered by Care UK, Out of Hours GP services for Birmingham South Central by Badger Group, Herefordshire and Sandwell & West Birmingham Out of Hours by Nestor Primecare, and Rugby Out of Hours by Vocare.

== Primary care ==
In 2015, the medical journal, Pulse reported that doctors in some English areas, notably South Birmingham are paid to limit hospital referrals. The payments include limiting referrals for cancer patients. The scheme is controversial and some members of the British Medical Association fear it could affect patient care adversely. GMC guidelines forbid doctors to receive, "inducement, gift or hospitality" which influences or can be seen as influencing the way patients are treated or referred. There is concern the payments could affect doctor patient trust.

A multispecialty community provider was being developed by Dudley CCG in 2015. It included all the GP practices in the borough, Dudley Metropolitan Borough Council, and Black Country Partnership NHS Foundation Trust. Our Health Partnership planned to be the single largest provider of primary care services in the UK. It was established from a consortium of four NHS trusts and 38 local GP practices to manage a single, whole population budget for about 300,000 people. It provides community-based physical health for adults and children, some outpatient services, primary medical services, mental health services, public health, learning disabilities services, urgent care centres and GP out-of-hours care. Adult social care services were to be introduced at a later stage of the 15-year contract.

In February 2018 it was reported that there had been a 10.8% increase in the emergency admissions rate in the area between 2014–15 and the 12 months to September 2017. By March 2018 it was clear that most of the GP practices would retain their own individual contracts and would not be “fully integrated” into the new organisation.

The Connected Care Partnership vanguard, based in Sandwell, is an alliance formed by Modality Partnership, Sandwell and West Birmingham Hospitals NHS Trust, Birmingham Community Healthcare NHS Foundation Trust, Birmingham and Solihull Mental Health NHS Foundation Trust, the now-defunct Sandwell and West Birmingham CCG and the Intelligent Commissioning Federation, a network formed by 15 GP practices in Ladywell, Birmingham. Royal Wolverhampton Hospitals NHS Trust runs eight GP practices out of the 44 in Wolverhampton, with a total registered list of 52,862 patients.

== Hospital provision ==
Hospitals trusts in the region are:

- University Hospitals Coventry and Warwickshire NHS Trust
- Sandwell and West Birmingham Hospitals NHS Trust
- Dudley Group NHS Foundation Trust
- Royal Wolverhampton Hospitals NHS Trust
- Royal Orthopaedic Hospital NHS Foundation Trust
- University Hospitals Birmingham NHS Foundation Trust
- Birmingham Women's and Children's NHS Foundation Trust
- Walsall Healthcare NHS Trust

An arrangement where University Hospitals Birmingham NHS Foundation Trust provided oncology services in Sandwell was terminated in October 2017 “due to the unsustainability of staffing at the Sandwell and City sites”.

Sandwell and West Birmingham Hospitals NHS Trust, Dudley Group NHS Foundation Trust and Walsall Healthcare NHS Trust formed the Black Country Alliance in 2015, and Royal Wolverhampton Hospitals NHS Trust joined it in 2017. It was renamed the Black Country Provider Partnership. Merger of their pathology services at a hub in Wolverhampton was planned by June 2019, with expectations of £5 million a year savings.

== Mental health ==
NHS mental health services are provided by Birmingham and Solihull Mental Health NHS Foundation Trust, Black Country Healthcare NHS Foundation Trust, and Coventry and Warwickshire Partnership NHS Trust. They have formed an accountable clinical networks called MERIT – The Mental Alliance for Excellence, Resilience, Innovation and Training, and set up a common bed management system for the 796 inpatient beds they run. They have also established an electronic shared health record. They hope to realise savings of £6 million by 2020-21.

The Forward Thinking Birmingham consortium was selected to deliver a new combined mental health service for people aged 0–25 across the city of Birmingham from October 2015. The consortium is led by Birmingham Children's Hospital NHS Foundation Trust and includes Worcestershire Health and Care NHS Trust, the Priory Group, Beacon UK, and The Children's Society. The 5-year contract had an annual value of £23.7m. It was projected to result in the mental health trust losing £14.2m a year. An independent impact assessment recommended delayed implementation and “bridging funding” of at least £1.5m to enable the safe transition of some adult services. The joint commissioning board for the three Birmingham and Solihull clinical commissioning groups agreed in June 2017 to spend an additional £8.1 million over two years to ease pressure on adult mental health beds after an independent report produced by Mental Health Strategies had "unearthed unsafe clinical practice due to a shortfall in bedded capacity". The contract only provided 28 inpatient mental health beds for young adults but the service consistently had about 51 inpatients. Worcestershire Health and Care NHS Trust left the consortium in April 2018 because it is part of the Herefordshire and Worcestershire sustainability and transformation partnership.

In 2018 it was reported that all eight coroners in Birmingham had begun to see a theme across mental health deaths – a lack of finances and resources. In the year from June 2018 there were 12 deaths of patients under the care of the crisis home treatment services of Birmingham and Solihull Mental Health NHS Foundation Trust. Clinicians had concerns about inadequate staffing levels, long waiting lists, and a lack of inpatient bed capacity.

== Community services ==
Birmingham Community Healthcare NHS Foundation Trust is the main NHS provider.

In 2016, Stephen Dorrell was appointed to chair an independent board to advise and oversee the partnership between health and social services in the Birmingham and Solihull Sustainability and transformation plan as it developed over the following five years.

All Together Better Dudley, a Multispecialty community provider, set up teams including social care, district health and practice based pharmacists which include voluntary sector link workers. As of 2016, this had reduced GP visits among the targeted patients. Plans to create the first integrated care trust in Dudley by splitting the Foundation Trust have been repeatedly delayed because of the difficulty of constructing a contract.

The Nishkam Healthcare Trust in Handsworth is a charity established in 2012. It is part of the Sikh organisation Guru Nanak Niskham Sewak Jatha. The volunteers include 20 doctors and consultants and more than 25 pharmacists. They run two pharmacies, a dental service, a mental and emotional wellbeing project, a start-of-life initiative and a diagnostic centre. They see about 40,000 people a year, many of whom find it hard to access NHS services.

== See also ==
- Category:Health in the West Midlands (county)
- Healthcare in the United Kingdom
