= Healthcare in Northumberland =

Healthcare in Northumberland was the responsibility of the Northumberland, Newcastle Gateshead, and North Tyneside clinical commissioning groups from 2013 to 2022 before being replaced by integrated care systems.

== History ==
From 1947 to 1974 NHS services in Northumberland were managed by Newcastle Regional Hospital Board. In 1974 the boards were abolished and replaced by regional health authorities. Northumberland came under the Northern RHA. Regions were reorganised in 1996 and Northumberland came under the Northern and Yorkshire Regional Health Authority. Northumberland from 1974 had one district health authority. A primary care trust, the Northumberland Care Trust, was established covering the whole the county in 2002. It was managed by the North East Strategic Health Authority from 2002 until 2013.

Northumberland CCG took on the responsibilities of the former PCT on 1 April 2013. Steven Mason, chief executive of Northumberland County Council was appointed its accountable officer in January 2017, replacing the former chief clinical officer Alistair Blair, who was to lead a new accountable care organisation.

== Sustainability and transformation plan ==
Northumberland, Tyne and Wear formed a sustainability and transformation plan area in March 2016 with Stephen Eames, the Chief Executive of North Cumbria University Hospitals NHS Trust as its leader. This plan, as far as Cumbria was concerned, was abandoned in April 2017. The plan proposed to eliminate a projected 2020/21 deficit of £641 million and establish a Northumbria accountable care organisation. It planned to improve prevention services to reduce smoking and obesity. The North East commissioning support unit was to be transformed into a community interest company owned by its 11 CCG customers.

In April 2018 it emerged that there were proposals to merge the STP for Northumberland, Tyne and Wear with those for Cumbria and Darlington, Teesside, Hambleton, Richmondshire and Whitby; this would create the largest STP in the country with a population of 3.2 million. North Tees and Hartlepool NHS Foundation Trust chief executive Alan Foster was made lead for all three STPs in October 2017. The twelve CCGs involved set up a joint commissioning committee with delegated decision-making powers.

Northumbria Healthcare NHS Foundation Trust and Northumberland County Council formed a partnership called the NHS Northumbria International Alliance which provides consultancy services for the development of integrated care systems. It has contracts in China and in Ireland with Vanguard Health Services International.

== Public health ==
The Northumberland, Tyne and Wear Region had the highest death rate from respiratory diseases of any region in Europe in 2015 at 154 per 100,000 population.

== Commissioning ==
North Tyneside Clinical Commissioning Group was rated as inadequate by NHS England and entered into a management arrangement with Newcastle Gateshead CCG in January 2017.

== Development ==
Northumbria is a vanguard area for the development of integrated primary and acute care systems as proposed in the Five Year Forward View. It was given £8.3 million in 2015 as a transformation fund and planned to create a single 'accountable care organisation' for the county to become operational in 2017. This would be the first in the NHS and would take over most of the functions of the clinical commissioning group. It would also undermine the principles of the NHS internal market.

== Primary care ==
There are 44 GP practices in Northumberland which have agreed to form a county-wide federation. Out-of-hours services are provided by Northern Doctors Urgent Care.

North Tyneside Clinical Commissioning Group set up a 12-month pilot using LIVI in August 2020 to offer online video appointments for all of its patients. This was expected to deliver an extra 21,000 GP appointments a year. Livi GPs would have full access to patient records.

== Community care ==
Palliative care is provided by HospiceCare which has two centres in Alnwick and Berwick.

In May 2017 Care North East, which represents 1,747 out of 2,806 private care homes in Northumberland refused to agree a three-year contract with Northumberland County Council. They said the current cost of providing residential care in Northumberland was £535.88 per resident, per week. The council was offering £506.43.

Northumbria Healthcare NHS Foundation Trust has had a partnership with the county council since 2011. The CCG and Northumberland County Council were co-located.

== Mental health ==
Mental health services in the county are provided by Cumbria, Northumberland, Tyne and Wear NHS Foundation Trust.

== Hospital services ==
Acute hospital services are provided by Northumbria Healthcare NHS Foundation Trust. It opened the first specialist emergency care hospital in the UK, at Cramlington in 2015, with emergency consultants on site 24 hours a day. The North East Ambulance Service covers the county.

Healthwatch Northumberland is an organisation set up under the Health and Social Care Act 2012 to act as a voice for patients.

== See also ==
- Category:Health in Northumberland
- Healthcare in the United Kingdom
