= NHS West Midlands =

Strategic health authority in England

NHS West Midlands was a strategic health authority (SHA) of the National Health Service in England. It operated in the West Midlands region, which is coterminous with the local government office region. It was abolished in April 2013.

== General information ==
NHS West Midlands (also known as West Midlands Strategic Health Authority) was created in July 2006, following the merger of Birmingham and The Black Country, Shropshire and Staffordshire, and West Midlands South SHAs.

It covered an area of approximately 5,000 square miles (13,000 km^{2}) with a population of approximately 5.4 million. The region had a total of 46 NHS organisations: 19 hospital trusts (including nine NHS foundation trusts); six mental health trusts (including three foundation trusts); 17 primary care trusts; three community provider trusts and one ambulance services trust.

The strategic health authority was responsible for ensuring that the circa £10 billion spent on health and health care across the region delivers better services for patients and value for money for the people living in the West Midlands.

The areas encompassed by the SHA were: Birmingham, Coventry, Dudley, Herefordshire, Sandwell, Shropshire, Solihull, Staffordshire, Stoke-on-Trent, Telford and Wrekin, Walsall, Warwickshire, Wolverhampton and Worcestershire.

There were approximately 126,000 staff employed by the NHS in the West Midlands.

== NHS organisations within the West Midlands ==
Before it was reorganized out of existence, the following organizations were part of the West Midlands SHA:

=== Primary care trusts ===
Primary care trusts were abolished in April 2013.

- Birmingham East and North Primary Care Trust
- NHS Coventry (Coventry Teaching PCT)
- Dudley PCT
- Heart of Birmingham Teaching PCT
- Herefordshire PCT
- NHS North Staffordshire (North Staffordshire PCT)
- Sandwell PCT
- Shropshire County PCT
- Solihull PCT
- NHS South Birmingham (South Birmingham PCT)
- South Staffordshire PCT
- Stoke On Trent PCT
- Telford and Wrekin PCT
- NHS Walsall (Walsall Teaching PCT)
- NHS Warwickshire (Warwickshire PCT)
- Wolverhampton City PCT
- NHS Worcestershire (Worcestershire PCT)

=== Community provider organisations ===
- Birmingham Community Healthcare NHS Foundation Trust
- Shropshire Community Health NHS Trust
- Worcestershire Health and Care NHS Trust

=== Acute trusts ===
- Birmingham Children's NHS Foundation Trust
- Birmingham Women's NHS Foundation Trust
- Burton Hospitals NHS Foundation Trust
- The Dudley Group NHS Foundation Trust
- George Eliot Hospital NHS Trust
- Heart of England NHS Foundation Trust
- Wye Valley NHS Trust
- Mid Staffordshire NHS Foundation Trust
- Robert Jones and Agnes Hunt Orthopaedic Hospital NHS Trust
- The Royal Orthopaedic Hospital NHS Foundation Trust
- The Royal Wolverhampton Hospitals NHS Trust
- Sandwell and West Birmingham Hospitals NHS Trust
- Shrewsbury and Telford Hospital NHS Trust
- South Warwickshire NHS Foundation Trust
- University Hospital Birmingham NHS Foundation Trust – one of the largest in the country, with four hospitals: Queen Elizabeth, Heartlands, Good Hope, and Solihull.
- University Hospital of North Staffordshire NHS Trust
- University Hospitals Coventry & Warwickshire NHS Trust
- Walsall Healthcare NHS Trust
- Worcestershire Acute Hospitals NHS Trust

=== Mental health trusts ===
- Birmingham and Solihull Mental Health NHS Foundation Trust
- Coventry and Warwickshire Partnership NHS Trust
- Dudley and Walsall Mental Health Partnership NHS Trust
- North Staffordshire Combined Healthcare NHS Trust
- Black Country Partnership NHS Foundation Trust
- South Staffordshire and Shropshire Healthcare NHS Foundation Trust

=== Ambulance trusts ===
The West Midlands Ambulance Service NHS Foundation Trust serves the area. The ambulance trust started deploying electric vehicles, including an electric ambulance, in 2020. The initial experience raised concerns about range and refueling times. The typical ambulance in this service area drives 800 miles per day.
