= Christiana Melam =

British Nigerian social entrepreneur

- Born: Nigeria
- Occupation(s): Entrepreneur; Social prescribing
- Website: https://www.nalw.org.uk/

Christiana Melam MBE is a British-Nigerian social entrepreneur. She is the founder and CEO of the National Association of Link Workers. They are a social enterprise which advances in social prescribing of link workers. They lead in setting standards and serve as a guiding force for practitioners within the United Kingdom. Melam advocates for diversity, inclusion, coproduction, bottom-up approaches, social justice, empowering people and reducing inequality.

== Early life and education ==
Christiana was born in Nigeria. She did her bachelor's in Banking and Finance later switching to public health, obtaining her MSC degree in public health and health promotion from London South Bank University in 2012. She began her PhD research in Social prescribing at Birmingham City University in 2022.

== Career ==
In 2018, she founded the National Association of Link Workers, a social enterprise advancing social prescribing link workers.

== Recognition ==
In 2024, Melam was awarded an MBE in the 2024 New Year Honours for her services to social prescribing.

Melam has been listed among the 50 most influential Black, Asian and Minority Ethnic People in Health in 2021, 2022, and 2023 by Health Service Journal (HSJ).

In 2022, Melam was listed among the 100 Female Entrepreneurs to Watch by The Daily Telegraph.

== Bibliography ==
- The Social Prescribing Link Worker Model: Insights and Perspectives from Practice, ISBN 978-1801610001.

== See also ==
- Female entrepreneurs
