= Healthcare in Hampshire =

Healthcare in Hampshire was the responsibility of six clinical commissioning groups until July 2022. These were based in Southampton, Portsmouth, North East Hampshire and Farnham, South Eastern Hampshire, West Hampshire, and North Hampshire. In 2018, the Hampshire and Isle of Wight Partnership of Clinical Commissioning Groups was set up. Maggie MacIsaac was Chief Executive.

== History ==
From 1947 to 1965 NHS services in Hampshire were managed by South-West Metropolitan Regional Hospital Board. In 1965 a new board was formed for Wessex which covered Hampshire. In 1974 the boards were abolished and replaced by regional health authorities. Hampshire came under the Wessex RHA. Regions were reorganised in 1996 and Hampshire came under the South and West Regional Health Authority. Hampshire had an area health authority from 1974 until 1982 when it was divided into four district health authorities for Basingstoke and North Hampshire, Southampton and South West Hampshire, Winchester and Portsmouth and South East Hampshire. Basingstoke and North Hampshire and Winchester were amalgamated into North and Mid Hampshire District in 1994. Regional health authorities were reorganised and renamed strategic health authorities in 2002. Hampshire was part of Hampshire and Isle of Wight SHA. In 2006 regions were again reorganised and Hampshire came under NHS South Central until that was abolished in 2013. There were three primary care trusts for the area: NHS Southampton City, NHS Hampshire, and NHS Portsmouth.

== Sustainability and transformation plans ==
Hampshire and the Isle of Wight formed a sustainability and transformation plan area in March 2016 with Richard Samuel, the Chief Officer of Fareham and Gosport and South Eastern Hampshire Clinical Commissioning Groups as its leader

It is proposed to cut 300 beds in the acute sector and to move some services from St Mary's hospital on the Isle of Wight to the mainland and to establish integrated primary care hubs with multiprofessional primary care teams with extended skills.

Four clinical commissioning groups, North Hampshire, Fareham and Gosport, North East Hampshire and Farnham, and South Eastern Hampshire, formed a Partnership Board in May 2017 to deal with the Hampshire and Isle of Wight STP and the Frimley Health and Care System STP.

== Commissioning ==
Care UK have a contract for elective treatment and urgent care services with Portsmouth CCG which was renewed for 5 years in September 2015. It is worth £54.6 million.

In 2018 the Isle of Wight CCG became part of the Hampshire CCG Partnership with Fareham and Gosport, North Hampshire, North East Hampshire and Farnham, and South Eastern Hampshire CCGs.

== Primary care ==
There are 173 GP practices in the county. Out-of-hours services are provided by Hampshire Doctors on Call Service. GPs and community services in Portsmouth adopted a shared electronic health record system in October 2015.

A practice-based pharmacist scheme established in West Hampshire in 2015 which employed 9.6 whole-time equivalent pharmacists and 2.2 pharmacy technicians reduced the cost of medication by conducting medication reviews. Savings were more than double the cost of the scheme.

In 2021, a five-year contract was agreed upon for information technology support for 228 GP sites across the county and the Isle of Wight with Healthcare Computing, in partnership with NHS Arden & Greater East Midlands Commissioning Support Unit.

== Acute services ==
Acute services are provided by Hampshire Hospitals NHS Foundation Trust, Portsmouth Hospitals NHS Trust and University Hospital Southampton NHS Foundation Trust. Proposals made in 2015 for a new critical treatment hospital at North Waltham, Hampshire were not supported by the local clinical commissioning groups Joint Commissioners' Steering Group. Since 2008 there have been proposals to reorganise vascular services and to concentrate them in Southampton, but the Portsmouth trust has repeatedly objected.

There are four hospitals in the county with accident and emergency facilities: Basingstoke and North Hampshire Hospital, the Royal Hampshire County Hospital in Winchester, Southampton General Hospital (a major trauma centre) and the Queen Alexandra Hospital in Portsmouth. In addition, Frimley Park Hospital is located just over the county border from Farnborough, and the Royal Bournemouth Hospital is closer to parts of the New Forest District than Southampton. Ambulance services are provided by South Central Ambulance Service (SCAS), except in the northeast of the county, where it is provided by South East Coast Ambulance Service (SECAmb).

== Mental health and community services ==
Solent NHS Trust, Southern Health NHS Foundation Trust and Surrey and Borders Partnership NHS Foundation Trust are the main providers of NHS mental health and community services. Vista Healthcare runs a low secure private hospital in Winchfield.

The primary and acute care system in North East Hampshire and Farnham established a mental health cafe as a joint initiative which has reduced mental health hospital admissions by 33%.

Millbrook Healthcare runs the wheelchair service.

Hampshire County Council announced in 2020 that its Digitally Enabled Care provided by Argenti had saved them £3.4 million in 2019/20 because 39% of those using the service avoided an increase in their package of care or an admission to hospital.

== Healthwatch ==
There are three local Healthwatches for Hampshire, Portsmouth and Southampton.

== See also ==
- Healthcare in the United Kingdom
