= Wakefield and Pontefract Community Health NHS Trust =

British local healthcare service

Wakefield and Pontefract Community Health NHS Trust was a community health trust which served the Wakefield metropolitan district, West Yorkshire providing community, mental health and learning disability services.

Logo of the former Wakefield and Pontefract Community Health NHS Trust

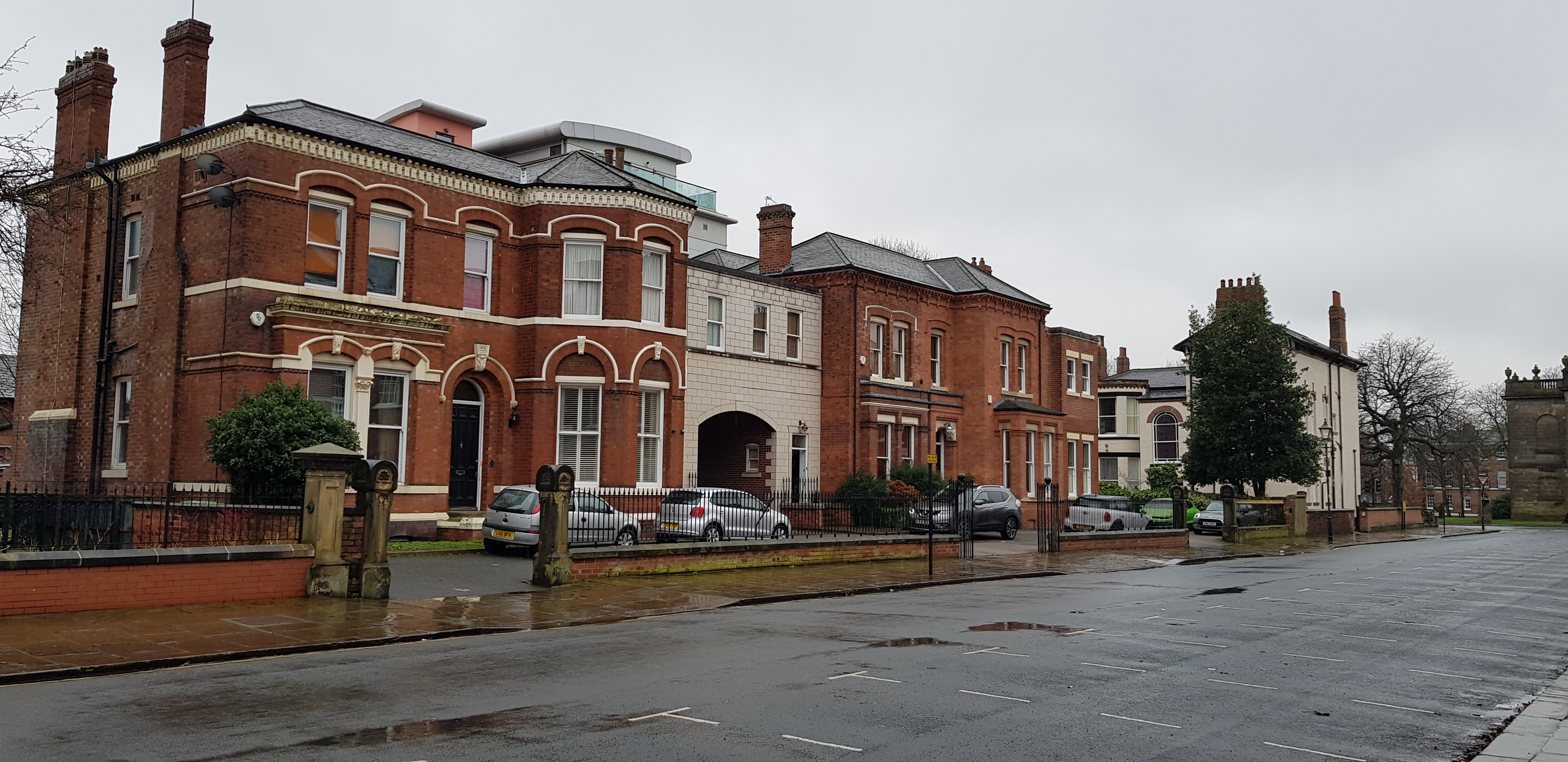
Former Trust HQ, St. John's North, Wakefield

== History ==
The trust was formed on 1 April 1993 and operated from a number of locations including Fieldhead Hospital, The Yorkshire Centre for Forensic Psychiatry (also known as Newton Lodge) the former Castleford, Normanton and District Hospital, Southmoor Hospital and Ackton Hospital (all now closed) and numerous health centres and other standalone units across the Wakefield district.

The headquarters for the trust was called Fernbank and was located at 3-5 St. John’s North, Wakefield which upon disestablishment of the trust in 2002, the buildings were returned to residential occupation with the four-storey office block connected to the main building at the rear was refurbished and converted into flats.

== Disestablishment ==
The trust was disestablished on 1 April 2002 when the mental health services were taken over by South West Yorkshire Mental Health NHS Trust which also took over mental health services in Kirklees and Calderdale. The community health services were taken over by the newly created Wakefield West and Eastern Wakefield primary care trusts.
