= Sutton Homes of Care =

Sutton Homes of Care is one of six vanguard projects focussed on ‘Enhanced health in care homes’ established under the Five Year Forward View in 2015.

It is a partnership involving Sutton Clinical Commissioning Group, Epsom and St Helier University Hospitals NHS Trust, Sutton Health Community Services, London Ambulance Service, South West London and St George's Mental Health NHS Trust, the London Borough of Sutton, Age UK Sutton, St Raphael's Hospice, Alzheimer's Society and Sutton Care for the Voluntary Sector.

It has established a number of initiatives intended to keep residents of the 70 care homes in the borough out of hospital, or to get out of hospital more easily. These include regular named-GP visits to local care homes to provide healthcare, health and wellbeing reviews and end-of-life planning. It claims credit for a 10% drop in visits to A&E. Training is provided for care home staff. A Red Bag Scheme has improved transfers between homes and hospitals by ensuring that the patients clothes, notes, and false teeth if necessary accompany them back and forward.

The draft sustainability and transformation plan for south west London proposes to roll out the model across six boroughs with a population of around 1.4 million.
