= Locala =

NHS service provider in Yorkshire

Locala Community Partnerships is a community interest company providing NHS community services in Yorkshire and Greater Manchester. It was developed by Kirklees Primary Care Trust as a result of the Transforming Community Services initiative in 2011.

Their first generation of mobile workers used rugged Toughbook laptops and had access to clinical records, but had to go back to the office for anything else. They then developed a Facebook-style intranet called Elsie with personal profiles, photographs and details of employee personal interests enabling staff to confer remotely. Both patients and staff can use Microsoft Lync. All staff are now equipped with mobile devices using Dell technology with a hybrid cloud which can be used by employees over 3G or Wi-Fi to create and access records and manage work schedules. This permits staff to work without having repeatedly to return to an office base, which saves time in an area which is 40% rural. The digital system costs around 7% of the organisation’s turnover.

In April 2015 it won a contract to manage school nurses in Calderdale, previously run by Calderdale and Huddersfield NHS Foundation Trust. The local authority rejected a bid by Locala to run sexual health services jointly with the trust and decided to go with the trust alone.

Chief executive Robert Flack had a 27% pay rise – £26,000 – in 2014 while the staff bonus scheme – yearly gift vouchers worth £40 – was scrapped.

The organisation won a tender for the Care Closer to Home contract worth £284.9m over 7 years from Greater Huddersfield and North Kirklees clinical commissioning groups in June 2015. It will be delivered in a partnership with South West Yorkshire Partnership NHS Foundation Trust a local hospice and other third sector organisations.

In March 2022, it was awarded a new contract to deliver sexual health services in Stockport and Tameside, and in April 2024, Wigan.
