= Birmingham Dental Hospital =

Dental hospital in Birmingham, West Midlands

- Birmingham Community Healthcare NHS Foundation Trust
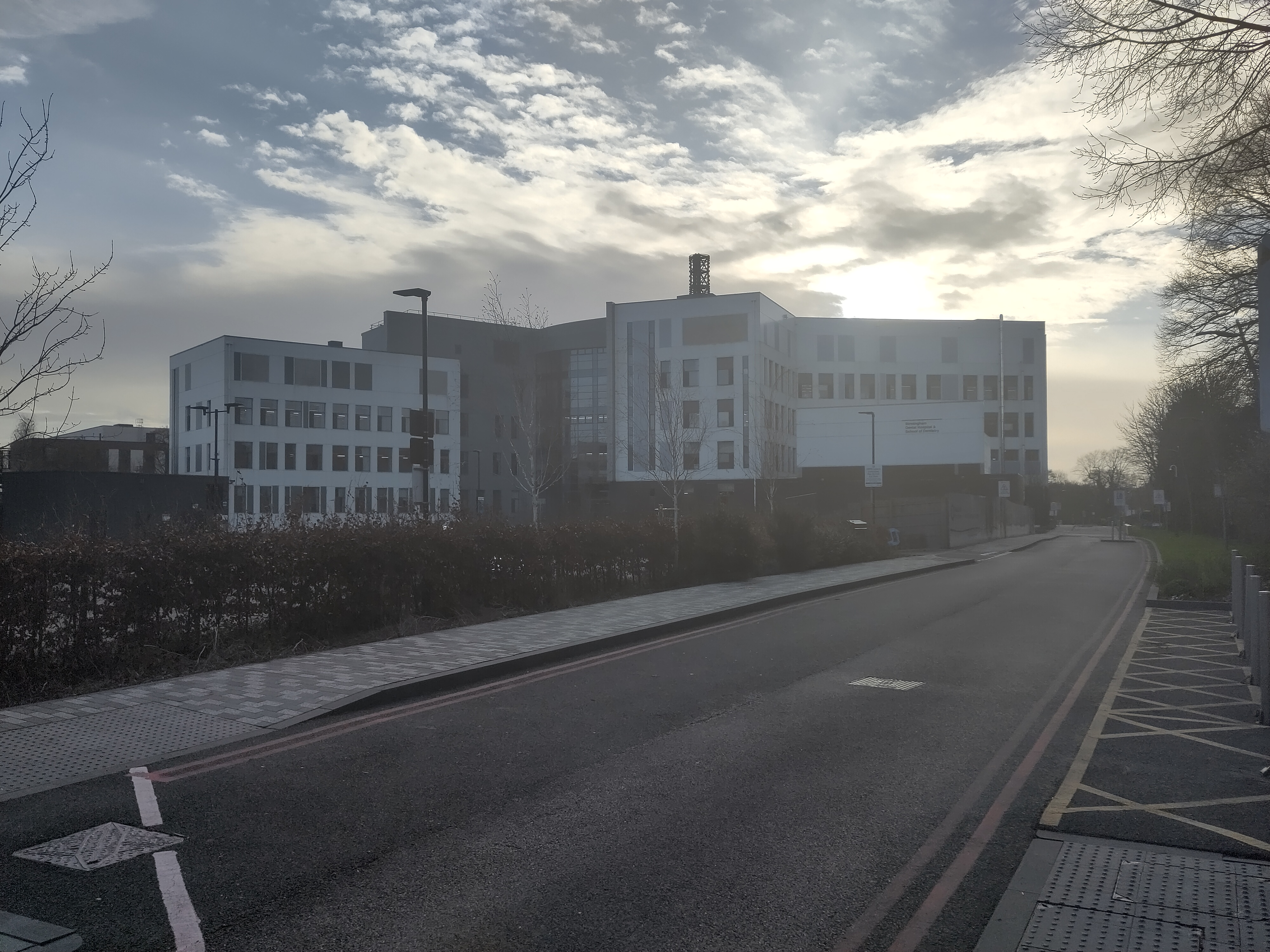

- Shown in West Midlands

Geography
- Location: Mill Pool Way, Birmingham, West Midlands, England
- Coordinates: 52.4499°N 1.9148°W

Organisation
- Care system: National Health Service
- Type: Dentistry

History
- Founded: 1858

Links
- Lists: Hospitals in England

Birmingham Dental Hospital is a dental facility in Mill Pool Way, Birmingham, West Midlands, England. The hospital is managed by the Birmingham Community Healthcare NHS Foundation Trust.

== History ==
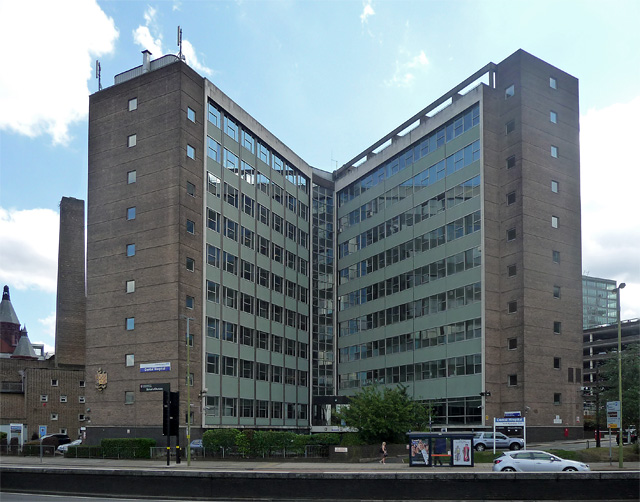
The old building in St Marys Row

The facility was originally established at Odd Fellows Hall on Temple Street, by Samuel Adams Parker, as the Birmingham Dental Dispensary in January 1858.

It moved to 2 Upper Priory in 1863 and to 9 Broad Street in 1871 and, after being formally constituted as the Birmingham Dental Hospital in 1880, it relocated to 71 Newhall Street in 1882. It moved again, this time to 132 Great Charles Street in 1905 and then re-located to purpose-built facilities, designed by S. N. Cooke & Partners, in St Mary's Row (later known as St Chad's Queensway) in 1966.

After the old St Mary's Row facility became decrepit, planning consent for a new facility to be located on the site of the former Pebble Mill Studios was obtained in November 2012. The new facility was procured under a private finance initiative contract in 2013 and was designed by One Create Environments.

It was built by Galliford Try at a cost of £34 million and was officially opened by Queen Elizabeth II in November 2015. Patients were first admitted in March 2016.
