= Dudley Integrated Health and Care NHS Trust =

Former NHS Trust

- Former name: Dudley and Walsall Mental Health Partnership NHS Trust
- Type: NHS trust
- Established: 1 August 2020
- Disbanded: 1 October 2024

Dudley Integrated Health and Care NHS Trust (DIHC) was an NHS trust set up in August 2020, providing primary care and integrated health services across Dudley. The Trust was previously known as Dudley and Walsall Mental Health Partnership NHS Trust.

== History ==
Dudley and Walsall Mental Health Partnership NHS Trust was established in October 2008. It provided mental health services across Dudley and Walsall, West Midlands, England. It previously managed Dorothy Pattison Hospital and Bloxwich Hospital in Walsall, and Bushey Fields Hospital in Dudley.

In December 2013, it was announced that the Trust would be among the first to trial the Care Quality Commission’s planned approach to inspecting mental health services because Monitor and the NHS Trust Development Authority wanted assurance on the quality of the services they provide before progressing their Foundation Trust applications.

The Trust, together with Black Country Partnership NHS Foundation Trust, set up a Liaison and Diversion service. The intention was that, "When someone in a police station, or involved in court proceedings, has a mental health problem or other vulnerabilities, they are referred to the right services and are given support and guidance based on their needs."

A planned merger with Birmingham Community Healthcare NHS Foundation Trust and Black Country Partnership NHS Foundation Trust was scheduled for October 2017. The new organisation would have an annual turnover of around £440 million – making it the third biggest mental health trust in England. The three way merger collapsed but the merger with Black Country Partnership was completed in April 2020, forming Black Country Healthcare NHS Foundation Trust.

The Trust and some remaining services became part of an integrated care provider known as Dudley Integrated Health and Care Trust which was expected to have a 15 year contract with Dudley Clinical Commissioning Group for community physical and mental health services, primary care, and some public health services.

== Performance ==
In 2020 the Care Quality Commission rated the trust as 'good' across all areas.

== Services ==
Dudley Integrated Health and Care Trust offered numerous services including:

- Continuing Health Care (CHC) - NHS care in the community
- Talking Therapies
- Primary Care Mental Health Services
- School Nursing
- General Practice Clinics
- Pharmaceutical Public Health

== Disestablishment ==
After operating for less than 5 years, the Trust was dissolved in October 2024. The Trust stated that "Since 2020 and Covid, the landscape has changed considerably, and a decision was made by system partners that DIHC was too small to be a stand-alone Trust."

All staff, services and properties transferred to Black Country Healthcare NHS Foundation Trust in August 2024.

== See also ==
- List of NHS trusts
- Healthcare in West Midlands
