= Prime Minister's Challenge Fund =

UK health funding programme

The Prime Minister's Challenge Fund was established in October 2013 with £50 million for NHS England to help improve access to general practice and stimulate innovative ways of providing primary care services.

== Pilots ==
Twenty pilots were announced in April 2014. On 30 September 2014, David Cameron announced a further £100 million in funding for 2015–16 to support a second wave of 37 pilots.

The fund has been used for a range of projects, including:

- the creation of a single front entrance and alterations to the Minor Injuries Unit at Newark Hospital for Sherwood Forest Hospitals NHS Foundation Trust;
- seven-day access and evening opening hours for Wigan Borough Clinical Commissioning Group;
- a virtual hub intended to allow patients to speak to doctors without needing to attend A&E or wait for an appointment, for SW Healthcare in Worcestershire.

== Criticism ==
The rationale has been described by Harry Longman:

- It's hard to get an appointment with your GP.
- More opening hours would make it easier.
- Let's provide 12 hours 8-8, 7 days a week.
- We'll have to pay a lot but just do it.

According to Longman the funding roughly doubles the capitation global sum for GPs who offer the scheme. It's a good deal for GPs, but, according to him, poor value for money because demand for primary care "typically starts quite high at 8am but tails off through the day and by 6 pm is very light" if there is sufficient supply during the day.

A YouGov poll in June 2015 found the highest priorities for the general public were care for the elderly and access to GPs at weekends.

An investigation by Pulse (magazine) in July 2015 found that many seven-day GP access pilot areas had reduced their extended hours in light of poor demand. In particular it appeared that there was very little demand for Sunday GP appointments and they had been abandoned in some places.

Richard Murray of the King's Fund hopes that working differently, on the basis of the pilot schemes (rather than just working harder) may hold the key to problems of access to primary care.
