= Stanley Royd Hospital =

- Wakefield and Pontefract Community Health NHS Trust
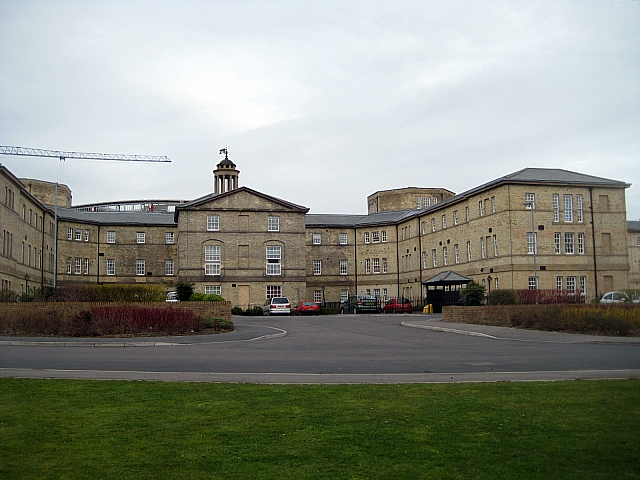
- Stanley Royd Hospital (since converted into flats)

- Shown in West Yorkshire

Geography
- Location: Wakefield, West Yorkshire, England
- Coordinates: 53.6909°N 1.4884°W

Organisation
- Care system: NHS
- Type: Specialist

Services
- Emergency department: N/A
- Speciality: Psychiatric and Learning Disability Hospital

History
- Founded: 1818
- Closed: 1995

Links
- Lists: Hospitals in England

The Stanley Royd Hospital, earlier named the West Riding Pauper Lunatic Asylum, was a mental health facility in Wakefield, West Yorkshire. It was managed by the Wakefield and Pontefract Community Health NHS Trust.

== History ==
The facility, which was designed by Watson and Pritchett using a corridor plan layout, was opened as the West Riding Pauper Lunatic Asylum in 1818. William Ellis, who had a reputation for employing the principles of humane treatment, was appointed the first superintendent of the asylum.

John Davies Cleaton, who had previously held the post of Assistant Medical Officer at the Lancaster Asylum was appointed Medical Director before becoming a Commissioner in Lunacy in 1866.

James Crichton-Browne, who was appointed superintendent at the hospital in 1866, went on to carry out pioneering research on the neuropathology of insanity.

After the facility joined the National Health Service in 1948, it became the Stanley Royd Hospital. In a serious incident at the hospital in August 1984, 355 patients and 106 members of staff were affected by salmonella food poisoning; the outbreak led to 19 patient deaths. After the introduction of Care in the Community, the hospital went into a period of decline and eventually closed in 1995. The hospital has since been converted for residential use and is now known as Parklands Manor.

== Mental Health Museum ==
The Mental Health Museum (previously known as the Stephen Beaumont Museum of Mental Health), located at Fieldhead Hospital in Wakefield, contains artefacts from and exhibits on the history of the asylum. Artefacts include restraining equipment, a padded cell, photographs, medical and surgical equipment, and documents. There is also a scale model of Stanley Royd Hospital, which was the museum's original location until the hospital closed in 1995.

== Influence ==
In 1852, plans of the Wakefield Asylum were plagiarised by Francesco Cianciolo who submitted them as his own in a design competition for an Asylum for the Insane in Malta. Cianciolo won the competition and the asylum was constructed between 1853 and 1861; the plagiarism was only found out after construction had commenced. The Malta asylum is still in use as the Mount Carmel Hospital.

== Notable inmates ==
- Mary Frances Heaton (1801–1878), who was convicted of insulting an Anglican vicar in 1837 and never released

== See also ==
- Listed buildings in Wakefield
