= DFG =

DFG may refer to:

== Businesses ==
- Dollar Financial Group, United States
- Dongfeng Motor Group, a Chinese carmaker

== Government ==
- California Department of Fish and Wildlife (formerly of Fish and Game), United States
- Deutsch-Französisches Gymnasium, any of five Franco-German international schools
- Disabled Facilities Grants, United Kingdom
- District Factor Group, a class of school district in New Jersey, US

== Non-profit organisations ==
- Days for Girls, nonprofit sanitary protection provider
- German Research Foundation (German: Deutsche Forschungsgemeinschaft), a funder
- German Peace Society (German: Deutsche Friedensgesellschaft)

== Other uses ==
- Deaf Frat Guy, a character from the Adam Carolla Show
- Difference-frequency generation, nonlinear optics frequency mixing
