= South West Yorkshire Partnership NHS Foundation Trust =

Health provider in the UK

South West Yorkshire Partnership Teaching NHS Foundation Trust
- Type: Mental health trust
- Budget: £230 million
- Chair: Marie Burnham
- Chief executive: Mark Brooks
- Staff: 4,235 whole time equivalent
- Website: www.southwestyorkshire.nhs.uk

South West Yorkshire Partnership Teaching NHS Foundation Trust is an NHS trust which provides mental health, learning disability and community health care services in Calderdale, Kirklees, Wakefield and Barnsley. The trust also provides some of the medium secure forensic services for the Doncaster and Yorkshire and the Humber region. The trust's headquarters is located at Fieldhead Hospital in Wakefield, which is a psychiatric and learning disabilities hospital.

== History ==
The logo of the now-defunct South West Yorkshire Mental Health NHS Trust.

The trust was formed in 2002 when mental health services in the southern half of West Yorkshire were reorganised and brought together the service provisions from the districts of Calderdale, Kirklees and Wakefield. The Trust was originally called South West Yorkshire Mental Health NHS Trust (SWYMHT) with the headquarters based at Fieldhead Hospital in Wakefield. The new trust inherited a large estate from the previous three predecessor Trusts such as the Sycamores Community Unit for the Elderly in Ossett; Poplars Community Unit for the Elderly in Hemsworth; Enfield Down in Honley; The Dales Unit and Lyndhurst in Halifax; the Priestley Unit and 8 Fox View in Dewsbury; Wells House in Sowerby Bridge and Castleford, Normanton and District Hospital.

On 31 March 2009, the trust became a NHS foundation trust and was renamed South West Yorkshire Partnership NHS Foundation Trust.

In 2013, when the primary care trustss were abolished as part of the Health and Social Care Act 2012 the trust took over the mental health services and community health care provisions from Barnsley PCT, and as such, the trust's footprint expanded to cover two counties. The trust's estate expanded once again to include Kendray Hospital and Mount Vernon Hospital with several health centres and offices within the Barnsley district.

Rob Webster, Former Chief Executive, was top of the poll in the Health Service Journal’s Top 50 chief executives in 2021, the first from a mental health trust.

== Services ==
The trust's structure is based upon six business delivery units (BDUs):

- Barnsley
- Calderdale
- Kirklees
- Sheffield
- Wakefield
- Forensic
- Specialist Services

Like most mental health trusts, the trust has reduced the number of beds to release resources for care at home.

Child and adolescent mental health services in Calderdale and Kirklees, previously delivered by Calderdale and Huddersfield NHS Foundation Trust were transferred to South West Yorkshire Partnership Foundation Trust in 2013.

Locala won a tender for the Care Closer to Home contract worth £284.9m over seven years from Greater Huddersfield and North Kirklees Clinical Commissioning Groups in June 2015, which is delivered in a partnership with the Trust, a local hospice and other third sector organisations.

On 1 September 2017, the trust launched a new perinatal mental health service which is based in Dewsbury and operates across the trust.

The trust was required to give undertakings in consideration of the Information Commissioner's Office not exercising its powers to serve an enforcement notice after it had sent patient data to the wrong address on several occasions.

The Trust was named by the Health Service Journal as one of the top hundred NHS trusts to work for in 2015. At that time, it had 4,235 full-time equivalent staff and a sickness absence rate of 4.81%. 63% of staff recommend it as a place for treatment and 56% recommend it as a place to work.

On 17 October 2025, the Trust announced that it had achieved Teaching status, formalising a partnership with University of Leeds. This included a name change to : South West Yorkshire Partnership Teaching NHS Foundation Trust.

== See also ==
- List of NHS trusts
