= Lakeside Healthcare =

Primary care provider in the United Kingdom

Lakeside Healthcare Group is a General practice and Primary Care Provider in the National Health Service. It with 80 partners and almost 200,000 patients operates from a number of sites across Cambridgeshire, Lincolnshire and Northamptonshire.

== Formation ==
The original practice, Lakeside Surgery, was one of the largest GP partnerships in England with 47,000 registered patients in 2014, the majority of Corby Clinical Commissioning Group's population, and 22 doctors. The practice managing partner Linda Ward joined as practice manager in 1988 and became managing partner, one of the first non-clinical partners in the country. She helped develop and open Corby Urgent Care Centre (later run by separate business 'Lakeside Plus Limited', see below). She retired in July 2014. Professor Robert Harris, former national Director of Strategy at NHS England and NHS National Commissioning Board, was appointed a full-time equity partner of Lakeside Surgeries in July 2014 with a remit to design and roll out its new models of care across a bigger geography.

Lakeside Healthcare Group has been appointed by NHS England as one of only 14 Multispecialty Community Providers across the NHS created by the Five Year Forward View which was published in 2014. Its intention is to enlarge the scope of general practice into hospitals, urgent care centres and ambulatory care, employing salaried doctors as well as other healthcare professionals - pharmacists, physician associates and healthcare assistants as well as different grades of nurses. It will manage some short-stay community care beds and deliver some services in the community which are now operated in hospital outpatient clinics. The strategic plan of Lakeside Healthcare Group is to be the provider of the majority of care needed by Lakeside patients and also a specialist provider of other services (e.g.urology, ophthalmology, dermatology and several other services) to a wider group of patients.

It describes itself as a "super-practice" and claims to be offering doctors “well above” the average pay for salaried GPs.

The new group was formed in July 2015 by the merger of Lakeside Surgeries with Headlands Surgery, Kettering. Initially other local practices that did not fulfill the requirements for full merger were offered 'affiliate' status. However, the preferred operating model is for practices to become fully integrated, sharing a common IT platform, workforce, clinical protocols and corporate governance. St Mary's Medical Centre, Sheepmarket Surgery and the Little Surgery in Stamford and Oundle Medical Practice agreed to join the organisation in September 2015 In July 2017, Rushden Medical Centre merged with Lakeside Healthcare Group bringing a further 11,000 patients and 4 further partners.

The work of the organisation has been welcomed by Jeremy Hunt who was quoted as saying ‘By integrating services and moving more care closer to people’s homes, we can ensure efficient spending and prevent unnecessary trips to hospital for the frail elderly and people with long-term conditions.’

Dr. Peter Wilczynski, formerly chair of Corby Clinical Commissioning Group resigned from that position to become Chair with Prof. Robert Harris becoming Chief Executive Officer of the expanded Lakeside Healthcare Group. The organisation plans to cover 300,000 patients eventually across the East Midlands region. Dr Wilczynski retired from the group and partnership in October 2019, with Prof. Harris retiring from the group and partnership in April 2021. Dr Sanjay Gadhia subsequently became chair of the group, and Mrs Jessica Bawden, CEO.

The practice applied to move its membership from Corby CCG (where it had 2/3 of the registered population) to Nene CCG in 2015. This plan was not approved because the membership transfer would according to Corby CCG board minutes have destabilised that CCG.

== Performance ==
Lakeside Healthcare in Stamford, Lincolnshire was placed into special measures in August 2021 by the Care Quality Commission. It was subsequently amalgamated with two other practices. In June 2022 it was uprated to ‘requires improvement’. The number of registered patients fell by 10% in two years. In common with all Lakeside sites, medical leadership rests with local GP partners. The CQC's chief concerns were in regards local medical leadership and local medications management. These issues were specific to Stamford. With the exception of Stamford, all other practices in the group are rated 'Good' by the Care Quality Commission. Since the CQC report a number of GP partners in Stamford left the practice.
