= Continuing healthcare =

The English national framework for NHS continuing healthcare came into force on 1 October 2007 as a development in the light of the case of Coughlan which established that where a person's need is primarily for health care then the health service must fund the whole cost of nursing home placement. People who qualify are entitled to care paid for by the NHS, for which they do not have to pay, rather than social care, which is means-tested. Most of those who qualify need nursing home care. It is in the interests of local social services departments to establish entitlement to continuing healthcare as this relieves them of any financial responsibility. This system has existed in one form or another since the creation of the NHS.

Payments until 2013 were administered by primary care trusts, and this was transferred to clinical commissioning groups. Many CCGs found towards the end of 2014 that they were in financial difficulties facing the combination of an ageing population with complex health needs and increasingly expensive care packages.

A comprehensive assessment of the person's care qualifications needs must be carried out by a multidisciplinary team, including relevant specialist and non-specialist assessments. An eligible person must establish that they have a complex medical condition and substantial and ongoing care needs. The framework replaced PCTs' individual policies for assessing eligibility for continuing care and local care planning and review processes, with the intention that the same criteria would be used throughout England. Funding already in place may be withdrawn following a joint reassessment of health and social care needs. A CCG's decision that someone is not eligible can be appealed through local resolution and then by an Independent Review Panel through NHS England. The final opportunity to challenge a decision is through the ombudsman. The decision can be challenged on grounds of process or application of the eligibility criteria.

In October 2014 the Northern, Eastern and Western Devon Clinical Commissioning Group found they were seeing an average of 34 CHC claims each month and planned to save up to £4.5 million by reviewing the decision-making thresholds for these claims. It also aimed to bring the prices paid into line with other areas and possibly bring assessment of claims carried out by community providers back in house.

In 2015-16, about £3.1 billion was spent. From November 2018 new guidance, issued without any public consultation, comes into force. 37 CCGs have introduced policies to cap the cost of providing support in a person's home at the cost of a residential care placement.

The Equality and Human Rights Commission wrote to thirteen clinical commissioning groups which is considered to have placed “arbitrary caps” on funding and failed to consider patients' individual needs. It threatened judicial review proceedings over such illegal discriminatory funding policies for people with serious long-term health conditions. The chief executive Rebecca Hilsenrath said: “It is utterly unacceptable that anyone should be forced into residential care when they are healthy enough to live independently and with their families. We will use our powers to ensure that the NHS thinks about this again.”

A new decision-making framework came into force on 1 October 2018, although there was no change to the eligibility criteria.

The assessment process was suspended at the start of the COVID-19 pandemic in England, replaced by emergency funding, but restarted in September 2020, including all those discharged over the previous five months. This was greeted with protests from clinical commissioning groups as it is expected that eligibility will be assessed on patients' current needs rather than needs when they were first referred.

As of 2025, post-Covid, NHS England expects face-to-face continuing healthcare assessments to be offered, although if the patient prefers it, online assessments should also be available. In the 2024-2025 financial year, 51,981 assessments were made in England for funding, with 41,806 (80.5%) being rejected.

The Parliamentary and Health Service Ombudsman produced a report in 2020 outlining common failings in the scheme. This found failings often resulted in families funding care when the NHS should have done so. It found people were often unaware of their entitlements and the processes to challenge decisions where they believed shortfalls were occurring in funding.

== Retrospective continuing healthcare claims ==
On 15 March 2012, the Department of Health announced a deadline of 30 September 2012 for individuals to request an assessment of eligibility for continuing healthcare funding, for cases during the period 1 April 2004 to 31 March 2011. Retrospective claims for previously unassessed periods of care can be considered regardless of whether the patient is still alive. Assessments of eligibility for CHC are the responsibility of the CCG, and are sometimes carried out by commissioning support units. The claim period dates from the completion of the initial screening checklist.
