= Bushey Fields Hospital =

- Black Country Healthcare NHS Foundation Trust
- Shown in West Midlands

Geography
- Location: Dudley, West Midlands, England
- Coordinates: 52°30′11″N 02°07′00″W

Organisation
- Type: Psychiatric hospital
- Affiliated university: None
- Patron: None

Helipads
- Helipad: No

History
- Founded: 1983

Links
- Website: https://www.blackcountryhealthcare.nhs.uk/our-services/bushey-fields-hospital

Bushey Fields Hospital is a psychiatric hospital located in Dudley, West Midlands, England managed by the Black Country Healthcare NHS Foundation Trust.

== History ==
The hospital is a small detached cabin-like building that opened in 1983 at the same time as the adjacent Russells Hall Hospital, and was expanded in the early 1990s to replace most of the remaining facilities at Burton Road Hospital, which closed in December 1993.
