= David Sloman =

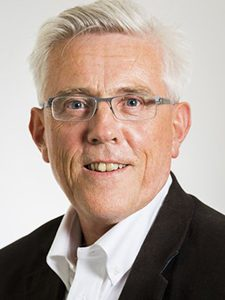
David Sloman

Sir David Morgan Sloman was the chief operating officer of NHS England. He has previously been the NHS regional director for London and the chief executive officer of the Royal Free London NHS Foundation Trust. He was knighted in 2017 for his services to the NHS.

== Career ==
Sir David Sloman was chief executive officer of the Royal Free London NHS Foundation Trust from 2009 to 2018. In 2016 he also became interim accountable officer at North Middlesex University Hospital NHS Trust, as part of the Royal Free's hospital chain project. Under his leadership, the Royal Free became one of only four high-performing foundation trusts to achieve ‘vanguard’ status and in 2018, Sloman oversaw the opening of the new £200m Chase Farm, the most digitally advanced hospital in the NHS. Sloman stepped down in early 2019 to take up a new role as NHS regional director in London.

Sloman was Regional Director for the NHS England London region from 2018 to 2021, where he had oversight of approximately 8,600 GPs, 1,600 GP practices, 18 acute hospital trusts, six specialist trusts, 11 community and mental health trusts and the London Ambulance Service.

Sloman was Chief Operating Officer (COO) for NHS England from December 2021 to August 2023. As COO he was the Senior Responsible Officer for the NHS's incident response to the COVID-19 pandemic. As well as overseeing operational delivery across all NHS services in England, he was responsible for overseeing policy, delivery and programmes of work on urgent and emergency care, elective care, primary care and community services, cancer, mental health, and learning disabilities and autism.

In 2016 the Health Service Journal named him as the third-most influential CEO in the National Health Service and in 2022 he was named the fourth-most influential person in English health policy.

Sloman was knighted in the 2017 New Year Honours for his services to the NHS.

In September 2023 he became an adviser to telehealth firm Doccla. (Directors of NHS England are not Crown Servants and appointments after leaving are not reviewed by the Advisory Committee on Business Appointments.)
