= Poor Law Officers' Journal =

- Discipline: English Poor Laws
- Language: English

Publication details
- History: 1892–1929

Standard abbreviations
- ISO 4: Poor Law Off.' J.

The Poor Law Officers' Journal was a journal published in England and Wales which kept Poor Law officials up to date with changes in the laws relating to Poor Law administration. The journal was set up in Rochdale, a large market town in Greater Manchester, and published from 1892 to 1929. It changed its name to the Public Assistance Journal and Health & Hospital Review which became the Health Service Journal in 1986.

The Editors of the Journal produced a number of guidebooks:

- Law Relating to the Relief of the Poor. 1924.
- The Poor-Law Institutions Order, 1913, and the Poor-Law Institutions (Nursing) Order, 1913, Together with the Local Government Board's Circular Letter Thereon.
- Provisional Proposals Of Minister Of Health For Poor-Law Reform Together With The Maclean Report. 1924.
- Law Relating to the Relief of the Poor. Poor-Law Publications. 1924.
- The Government Bill To Consolidate The Enactment Relating To The Relief of The Poor in England and Wales. n.d.
- The Local Government Act 1929. Law & Local Government Publications. 1930.
