= Birmingham and Solihull Mental Health NHS Foundation Trust =

- Type: Mental health trust
- Headquarters: 50 Summer Hill Road, Ladywood, Birmingham
- Region served: Birmingham and Solihull, England
- Budget: £250m (income 2005/2006)
- Chair: Sue Davis
- Chief executive: John Short
- Website: www.bsmhft.nhs.uk

Birmingham and Solihull Mental Health NHS Foundation Trust provides mental health care for people living in Birmingham and Solihull, England. It became a Foundation Trust in July 2008.

Sue Davis was appointed as the Chair for the Trust in November 2011, following Professor Peter Marquis, who retired in September 2011.

In 2012 the trust established a subsidiary company, Summerhill Supplies, to which 52 estates and facilities staff were transferred. The intention was to achieve VAT benefits, as well as pay bill savings, by recruiting new staff on less expensive non-NHS contracts. VAT benefits arise because NHS trusts can only claim VAT back on a small subset of goods and services they buy. The Value Added Tax Act 1994 provides a mechanism through which NHS trusts can qualify for refunds on contracted out services.

The trust was refused additional funding for community mental health services by Birmingham and Solihull Clinical Commissioning Group in April 2019 although Birmingham coroners had warned, after 8 patient deaths, that underfunding of mental health services was putting patients at risk.

== Performance ==
This was the first mental health trust to receive a published rating from the Care Quality Commission under its new inspection regime in September 2014, having volunteered to pilot the process. The trust's leadership, clinical effectiveness, responsiveness to patients, and caring nature were all rated as good. But the Trust was told to improve the safe storage of medicines and that people received medication in a timely manner; ligature risks and record keeping were addressed; and to increase the number of suitably qualified staff at some sites.

It was named by the Health Service Journal as one of the top hundred NHS trusts to work for in 2015. At that time it had 3924 full time equivalent staff and a sickness absence rate of 4.77%. 62% of staff recommend it as a place for treatment and 62% recommended it as a place to work.

The trust is actively engaged in research into the design of neuropsychiatry services for people with epilepsy and developing information technology based tools for managing mental health.

A shortage of mental health beds in the West Midlands in 2017 led to a patient spending a week in the urgent assessment unit, which is intended for stays of less than 12 hours, sleeping on a reclining chair. All the wards in the trust "continually" had an occupancy of more than 100%. 18 more beds are to be provided in the trust.

In the year from June 2018 there were 12 deaths of patients under the care of the crisis home treatment services of the trust. Clinicians had concerns about inadequate staffing levels, long waiting lists, and a lack of inpatient bed capacity.

== See also ==
- List of NHS trusts
- Healthcare in West Midlands
