= West Wakefield Health and Wellbeing Ltd =

British health organisation

West Wakefield Health and Wellbeing Ltd is a Multispecialty community provider established in 2015 based on a federation of six neighbouring GP practices in Wakefield which was initially funded by the Prime Minister's Challenge Fund to extend GP opening hours. working with Wakefield Clinical Commissioning Group

The practices involved are

- Church Street Surgery
- Orchard Croft Medical Centre
- Lupset Health Centre
- Prospect Surgery
- Middlestown Medical Centre
- Chapelthorpe Medical Centre

The company employed McChrystal Group based in Alexandria, Virginia at a cost of £420,000 to provide consultancy services. Funding came from the NHS New Models of Care Programme.

It claims to have saved 9,000 hours of GP time with pharmacists so far. It has established a social prescribing service. Care navigators have been recruited to signpost patients to local appropriate services. 114 had been trained by May 2016.

The HealthPod offers health checks in convenient locations, such as supermarket car parks. 16 sessions were delivered in April 2016, and 288 people participated.

It arranges assessments by a physiotherapist in the GP practice for patients with orthopaedic problems.

It works with Wakefield Connecting Care, another vanguard project established under the Five Year Forward View which delivers enhanced health in care homes.

It was managed and created by Dr Chris Jones and Sarah Fatchett. Leading the team to win both Prime Minister Challenge Fund and Vanguard monies.
