= Birmingham East and North Primary Care Trust =

NHS Birmingham East and North was an NHS primary care trust (PCT) that was formed on 1 October 2006 following the merger of Eastern Birmingham PCT and North Birmingham PCT. PCTs were abolished in April 2013.

NHS Birmingham East and North primary care trust provided primary care, intermediate care and community services on behalf of 440,000 people living in the east and north of Britain's second city. It was one of three primary care trusts that covered Birmingham. Following the Health and Social Care Act of 2012, the PCT was dissolved and NHS Birmingham CrossCity Clinical Commissioning Group become the largest commissioner of healthcare in the area.

The trust commissioned services from GPs, dentists, pharmacists, opticians, and voluntary sector organisations. It is held accountable for the quality and accessibility of these services, primarily by the Care Quality Commission.

NHS Birmingham East and North also answered to NHS West Midlands, the Strategic Health Authority for the region.

The trust employed over 1,700 staff, and was responsible for over 200 GPs working in more than 80 practices.

The trust spent hundreds of millions of pounds every year on services for local people; it also held the money to commission specialised services for people across the whole of the West Midlands. The trust directly provided primary care and community services through its Community Health Services arm.

== Areas served ==
The trust was charged with looking after the healthcare services for the following wards on the north and eastern half of Birmingham: Acocks Green, Bordesley Green, Erdington, Hodge Hill, Kingstanding and Oscott, Shard End, Sheldon, South Yardley, Stechford and Yardley North, Stockland Green, Sutton Four Oaks, Sutton New Hall, Sutton Trinity, Sutton Vesey, Tyburn, and Washwood Heath.

== Other responsibilities ==
NHS Birmingham East and North was responsible for Sutton Cottage and the John Taylor Hospice, Erdington. Plus, it is the lead commissioner for mental health, learning disabilities and sexual health in Birmingham.

It also hosted the infrastructure functions of estates, IT and finance and contractor services for all three Birmingham primary care trusts and the West Midlands Specialised Services Commissioning Team, which commissions specialised services on behalf of the region.

== Board ==
Paul Sabapathy CBE was Chairman of NHS Birmingham East and North, as well as holding the position of Her Majesty's Lord-Lieutenant for the County of the West Midlands. Sophia Christie was the chief executive of the trust.

== Innovations ==
It contracted Pfizer Health Solutions to operate Birmingham OwnHealth, a telephone support programme for people with chronic disorders.

In 2008, it offered financial incentives to overweight nurses to lose weight.
