= Kendray Hospital =

Hospital in South Yorkshire, England

- South West Yorkshire Partnership NHS Foundation Trust
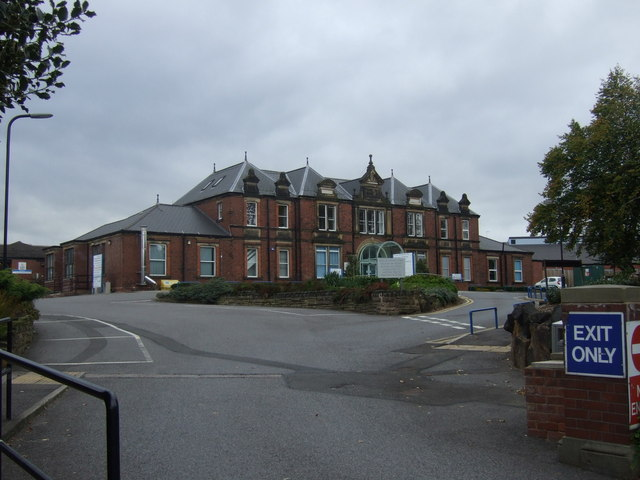
- Kendray Hospital

- Shown in South Yorkshire

Geography
- Location: Doncaster Road, Barnsley, South Yorkshire, England
- Coordinates: 53.5455°N 1.4567°W

Organisation
- Care system: NHS

Services
- Emergency department: No

History
- Founded: 1890

Links
- Lists: Hospitals in England

The Kendray Hospital is a health facility on Doncaster Road, Barnsley, South Yorkshire, England. It is managed by South West Yorkshire Partnership NHS Foundation Trust.

== History ==
The hospital was the gift of Mrs Ann Alderson Lambert, the last surviving daughter of Francis Kendray, a linen manufacturer. It was initially conceived as a fever hospital and the foundation stone was laid by the Mayor of Barnsley in March 1889. Barnsley Corporation provided the eleven acre site on Measborough Hill. The hospital was officially opened in February 1890. In 1892 77 cases of smallpox were admitted to the hospital but 21 of these cases were attributed to an infected tailor who had overpowered his nurse and escaped the hospital stark naked. Smallpox had largely died out by 1894 and admissions for scarlet fever became more common. It joined the National Health Service in 1948. In 1965 Kendray officially ceased to be an infectious diseases hospital. In 1979 it was announced that £6 million was to be spent on the hospital to provide facilities for the mentally ill and severely mentally infirm old people. A new biomechanics suite, intended to improve diagnosis and treatment for patients with lower limb ailments, opened in 2014.
