= Mount Vernon Hospital, Barnsley =

Hospital in South Yorkshire, England

Mount Vernon Hospital
- South West Yorkshire Partnership NHS Foundation Trust
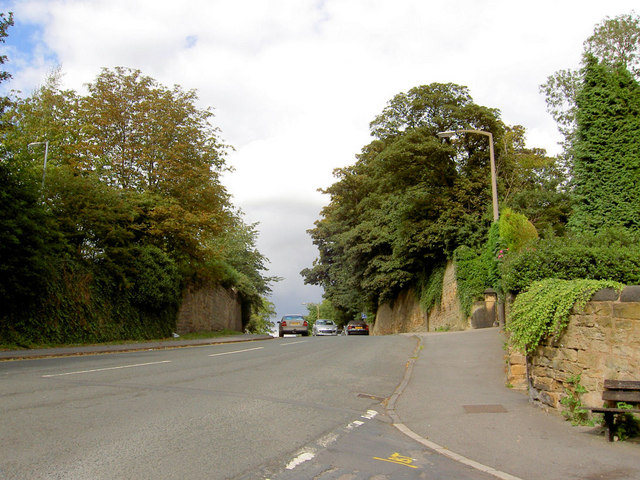
- At the top of Mount Vernon. The hospital was at the brow of the hill on the left.

- Shown in South Yorkshire

Geography
- Location: Mount Vernon Road, Barnsley, South Yorkshire, England
- Coordinates: 53.5382°N 1.4751°W

Organisation
- Care system: NHS

Services
- Emergency department: No

History
- Founded: 1915
- Closed: 2017

Links
- Lists: Hospitals in England

The Mount Vernon Hospital was a health facility in Mount Vernon Road, Barnsley, South Yorkshire, England. It was managed by South West Yorkshire Partnership NHS Foundation Trust.

== History ==
The hospital was established when a private house, previously owned by the Cooper family, was converted into a tuberculosis sanatorium in May 1915. It joined the National Health Service in 1948. Many of the older buildings were subsequently demolished and the site was redeveloped as a geriatric hospital with the new facilities being officially opened by the Princess Royal in 1961. Additional wards were added in 1974. After services had transferred to Barnsley Hospital, Mount Vernon hospital closed in December 2017. The site was subsequently sold to Orion Homes to facilitate residential development.
