= Castleford, Normanton and District Hospital =

Hospital in West Yorkshire, England

- South West Yorkshire Partnership NHS Foundation Trust
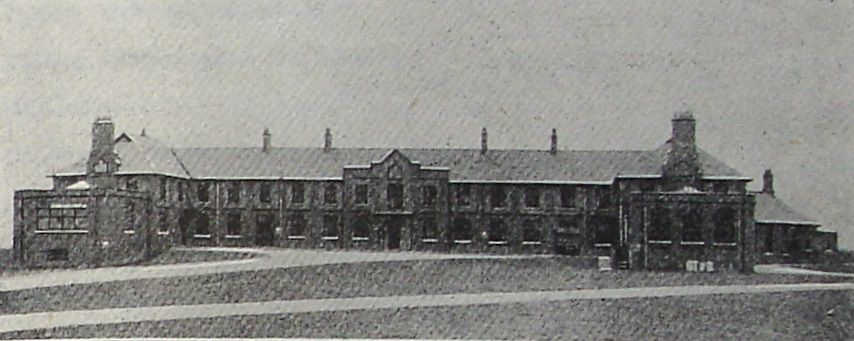
- Castleford, Normanton and District Hospital

- Shown in West Yorkshire

Geography
- Location: Lumley Street, Castleford, West Yorkshire, England
- Coordinates: 53.7202°N 1.3699°W

Organisation
- Care system: NHS

Services
- Emergency department: No

History
- Founded: 1924
- Closed: 2017

Links
- Lists: Hospitals in England

The Castleford, Normanton and District Hospital was a health facility in Lumley Street, Castleford, West Yorkshire, England. It was managed by South West Yorkshire Partnership NHS Foundation Trust.

== History ==
The facility was commissioned in 1924: it was available to patients from 1926 but not officially opened by Princess Mary until 23 August 1929. During the 1930s a significant amount of its funding came from Henry Briggs, Son and Co., a local coal mining business. It joined the National Health Service in 1948. A new 120-bed unit for the elderly opened in the 1970s.

After services transferred to Pontefract Hospital, the hospital closed in 2017. The buildings were demolished in summer 2018 and the site was subsequently developed by Persimmon for residential use.
