= Vista Healthcare =

British private psychiatric hospital

Vista Healthcare runs a low secure private hospital in Winchfield Hampshire for people with learning difficulties and associated problems. It is not connected to the Southern Utah rheumatology service company of the same name.

The company, Fairhome Care Group (WL) Ltd., was formed in 1987 and opened the hospital in 2002 with 17 beds. It now has 6 wards with a total of 67 beds and also provides community services.

A Care Quality Commission inspection in November 2014 found 334 incidents of physical abuse or violence in seven months, 272 of which were assaults on staff. They reported "little evidence that the provider had the specialist skills or systems to learn from these incidents and prevent them happening in the first place". In February 2015 NHS England closed one ward and moved patients out after the company failed to meet a deadline for improvements.
