= Social prescribing =

Healthcare referral to non-clinical services

Social prescribing (also known as community referral) is a process through which a person is referred to non-medical, community-based resources or activities, typically involving nature, art, movement, and service. In the UK, a Social Prescribing Link Worker may engage with a patient to support them with a plan which can be a series of signposting or referrals to support in the community, in order to improve their health and wellbeing. The concept has gained support in the NHS organisations of the United Kingdom as well as in Ireland and the Netherlands and forms part of the NHS Long Term Plan. The referral mechanisms, target groups, services offered through social prescribing vary across settings. However, the process usually involves screening for non-medical needs and referrals to support services that are typically offered by community-based organizations.

The goals of social prescribing are to reduce the rise of healthcare costs and easing pressure of general practice clinics. A 2015 Commission in the UK estimated that about 20% of patient consultations were for social problems rather than medical problems. Reporting finds social prescribing has been effective for treating symptoms of depression, ADHD, anxiety, chronic pain, dementia, type 2 diabetes, loneliness, and more.

== Definition ==
Social prescribing is a non-medical referral option for a range of professionals, including GPs and allied medical staff, as well as non-medical professionals working in the social care and charity sectors. Examples of social prescriptions include cycling lessons, art classes, museum visits, volunteer opportunities, befriending services, and more. People can also self-refer for support in many areas. Doctors can refer some of their patients to a social prescribing specialist or link worker who can then suggest local social groups which they can participate in to improve their health and wellbeing. These may include social enterprises, community businesses and local volunteer groups.

== Evaluation ==
A 2016 review in The BMJ concluded that further, more robust testing was needed to determine how effective it was, noting that evidence in favour of social prescription came from small trials that were open to a range of biases. A study of social prescription programs at 23 GP surgeries in central London found it produced a strong improvement in qualitative outcomes such as making participants less isolated, while quantitative outcomes such as general health and wellbeing were largely unchanged.

A 2020 review found that social prescribing can help people develop a sense of belonging and confidence. But for this to happen, link workers need the resources to develop extensive knowledge of local organisations and services. They also need to have enough time to build a relationship with their patients.

In the London borough of Merton, a review found that in 'pre COVID' times social prescribing reduced patients' GP appointments by 33% and Accident and Emergency (A&E) attendances by 50%. Their wellbeing scores improved by 77%. Five other studies looked at the effect on A&E attendances reporting an average 24% fall in attendance following referral.

A study published in 2023 examined the medical records of 8,357 adults aged 40 – 74 with type 2 diabetes. Blood sugar control was slightly better with social prescribing but other health measures were unchanged. When support matched the needs of the person, social prescribing could help people make positive changes and deal with social and health-related problems. But providing the right support could be time-consuming and challenging. It also cost more than usual care. The experience of social prescribing depended on client circumstances.

Researchers have shown how the same social factors that impact people's health also impact their capacity to engage with social prescribing, meaning that those with greatest need may be least able to benefit from interventions - an example of the inverse care law in action. For this and other reasons, it has been suggested that social prescribing is unlikely to reduce health inequalities, and may risk exacerbating them.

== Examples ==
In Brighton and Hove, pilot funding was provided in 2014 for a Community Navigator scheme. The pilot involved placing volunteer navigators in 16 of Brighton's 36 GP surgeries. In recognition of the programme's success, the local CCG took over funding the scheme when the pilot ended in 2016. The provider, Together Co, has been held up as an example of good practice for its provision of social prescribing and for running a link worker network in the city so that staff at a range of organisations can benefit from ongoing learning and development.

The Heritage Connectors and Heritage Buddies pilots from Historic England tested the potential of using local heritage for social prescribing via different types of volunteering. The results have gone on to form the basis of guidance for the Heritage and Social Prescribing Advice Hub.

In the state of Victoria, Australia, recommendation 15 from the Royal Commission into Victoria's Mental Health System recommended the establishment of one social prescribing trial per region in Local Mental Health and Wellbeing Services to support healthcare professionals to refer people, particularly older Victorians, living with mental illness, into community initiatives. Social prescribing trials are planned to commence in six Local Services. These services are being established in the local government areas of Frankston, Latrobe and Benalla-Wangaratta-Mansfield, Brimbank, Geelong-Queenscliffe and Whittlesea.

In 2024, journalist Julia Hotz published a book exploring examples of social prescriptions in two dozen countries including cycling lessons in the United Kingdom, art classes in Australia, culture vitamins in Denmark, farm-based daycare in Norway, theatre tickets in Canada, and a phone call program in the United States.

== Resources ==
A National Academy for Social Prescribing was established in the UK. There is also a National Association of Link Workers, which aims to support social prescribing staff, to lobby for improvements, and to provide guidance and continuing professional development to members.

Healthy London Partnership has produced a report intended to help CCG commissioners make decisions about implementing social prescribing and are also hosting a wiki specifically on Social Prescribing and Self Care.

== Conclusions ==
Social prescribing is a logical extension of the biopsychosocial model of healthcare. There are several theoretical and practical factors in favor of this scheme. Therefore, the momentum for social prescribing is likely to be sustained, even with the lack of evidence to support its growth. This scheme presents an approach for expanding the avenue of social care for the patients. However, it will only see success when healthcare professionals fully accept it as a useful mechanism for improving the overall health and wellbeing of their patients.

== See also ==
- College of Medicine (UK)
- Michael Dixon (doctor)
- Promotora
- West Wakefield Health and Wellbeing Ltd
