= Better Care Fund =

The Better Care Fund is a partnership between NHS England, the Ministry of Housing, Communities and Local Government, the Department of Health and Social Care and the Local Government Association. Its pooled budget, initially £5.3 billion, was announced by the Cameron Government in the June 2013 Spending Round. It aims at "meeting the challenges of integrating health and social care in England in order to keep people healthy for longer". Local councils are allowed to increase the local fund. The intention was to shift resources into social care and community services from the NHS budget in England and so save £1 billion a year by keeping patients out of hospital. The pooled budget includes the Disabled Facilities Grants.

Better Care Fund Plans are agreed by the 151 local Health and wellbeing boards and then reviewed by health and local government partners regionally before formal approval by NHS England. Initial analysis of the first plans submitted showed that social care would benefit from the fund by about £2 billion. This was four times the amount projected for hospitals to save from reduced activity.

From April 2017 the improved Better Care Fund, a local authority social care grant, was introduced and required to be pooled in the Better Care Fund. In 2019–20, the mandatory minimum allocated was £6.4 billion. Local areas can make also voluntary additional contributions to local funds and in 2019–20, a national total of £9.2 billion of health and social care budgets were pooled.

== Reception ==
The National Audit Office said in November 2014 that the plans had been inadequately thought through and were based on “optimism rather than evidence”. There was no evidence that showed that integrated care reduces unplanned hospital admissions. Its second report in February 2017 suggested that the progress of integration and health and social care had been slower and less successful than envisaged, and had not delivered all of the expected benefits for patients, the NHS or local authorities. It concluded that the £5.3 billion spent in 2015-16 had not delivered value for money. However, the report concluded that the fund was successful in boosting work between local areas with over 90 per cent of local areas agreeing or strongly agreeing that delivery of their plan had improved joint working.

Francis Maude praised Inclusion Healthcare at a speech in December 2014 about the Fund saying the company could provide care more cheaply and simply than the NHS. He said the fund was unlikely to lift the pressure from overcrowded hospitals because of “endless process and bureaucracy” in the NHS. He related how Inclusion had helped a homeless man with leg ulcers who was refusing to go into hospital because he could not afford to put his dog in kennels while he was there by writing "a cheque for £200 or whatever it cost to have the dog vaccinated and put into kennels". According to Maude, the firm say "actually if we had still been in the NHS we could never have done that without endless process and bureaucracy and auditing and which budget does it come out of, and how do we account for it, and it would never have happened”.

The Chartered Institute of Public Finance and Accountancy and the Healthcare Financial Managers Association surveyed the ambitious plans for saving money through integration financed by the BCF in December 2015 and concluded that 80% were likely to fail and that many were hampering progress, and “giving integration a bad name”. Targets for reduced hospital admission had generally not been delivered.

In February 2017 the National Audit Office produced a report saying that the £5.3 billion spent in 2015/16 had not delivered value for money. Emergency hospital admissions had increased by 87,000 between 2014/15 and 2015/16, rather than the planned reduction of 106,000, which had cost an additional £311 million. Delayed transfers of care increased by 185,000 days, rather than the planned reduction of 293,000, which had cost £146 million more.

The Personal Social Services Research Unit at the University of Kent reported in 2018 that, overall, the Fund had improved integrated working between health and social care.

In their Adult Social Care Funding and Integration survey in 2018, the Local Government Association found that 89% of respondents felt that the Better Care Fund had been fairly or very helpful in joining up care and support locally. It also found that 84% of respondents viewed it as either moderate or to a great extent, a key driver of local care integration.

The Department of Health and Social Care in 2019 asserted that the fund had been effective in helping to keep people living independently at home, providing joined-up reablement services, reducing delayed discharges across the system and achieving closer working between the NHS and social care services.
