= Disabled Facilities Grants =

Disabled Facilities Grants are paid under the Housing Grants, Construction and Regeneration Act 1996 for the provision of grant aided adaptations for disabled persons' properties within the UK. From 2020/21 the budget was increased to £573 million.

== Eligibility ==
A means-test, similar to that for Income Support is applied unless the application is made for the benefit of a child or a young person under the age of 19. The first £6,000 of any savings are ignored.

The applicant must be an owner occupier, a private tenant, a landlord with a disabled tenant, housing association tenant; or a local authority tenant. However, many councils have separate budgets and staff to deliver adaptations to their tenants .

== Provision ==
Local authorities may carry out the work either through provision of money to the applicant or through an agency service. Where an agency service is offered grant applicants are not obliged to take this up in order to receive a grant. In order for adaptation's to be provided an occupational therapist is usually required to carry out an assessment of the needs of the applicant.

A grant can be used for adaptations to give better freedom of movement into and around the home and/or to provide essential facilities within it. Examples of the work which may be covered by this assistance are:

- widening doors and installing ramps
- providing or improving access to rooms and facilities - for example, by installing a stair lift or providing a downstairs bathroom
- bathroom conversion e.g. providing level access shower, accessible WC and wash hand basin
- improving or providing a heating system which is suitable for the disabled person's needs
- improving access to and movement around the home to enable you to care for another person who lives in the property, such as a child
- alterations to door widths and ramps
- specialist equipment i.e. baths/ kitchens

The maximum mandatory value of works is £30,000 in England; however the local authority can use discretionary powers to increase the value of works.

== Performance ==
In 2019–20, almost 2 million households in England had one or more people with a health condition that required adaptations to their homes. These grants reduce hospital admissions and delay the need to move into costly residential care. People who went into residential care, and had previously received a grant on average moved just before their 80th birthday and stayed there 2 years. Those people who hadn't moved when they were 76 and stayed in residential care for 6 years.

There is a government mandated timescale of 18 months for approval and completion of work but delays and backlogs are widespread.

Home improvement agencies generally help people to apply for a grant working with occupational therapists to design the adaptations and arranging for contractors to carry out the work. The average payment in 2015 was a little less than £7,000 and about £300 million a year is spent. From 2015 the funding transferred to the Better Care Fund.

In most areas home improvement agencies (HIAs) help people to apply for a DFG by working with occupational therapists to design the adaptations and then arranging for contractors to carry out the works – taking the stress out of the process and assuring a fit for purpose solution.
