= Individual funding request =

An individual funding request is a procedure with the English and Welsh National Health Service for individuals who require treatments, drugs or therapies that are not normally funded.

== England ==
Before 2013 these requests were dealt with by primary care trusts. Then they were managed by clinical commissioning groups which each had an individual funding request panel. NHS England manages requests for specialised services which are commissioned by them. They are now dealt with by integrated care systems if the service is not managed by NHS England.

Applications are made by clinicians who are asked to supply evidence of clinical need, clinical and cost-effectiveness, the impact of refusal and exceptionality. This procedure cannot be used if there is likely to be a cohort of similar patients in the same or similar clinical circumstances as the requesting patient whose clinical condition means that they could make a similar request.

Requests are supposed to be dealt with within 20 days.

North Kirklees and Greater Huddersfield CCGs decided in January 2017 that they would stop most individual funding requests, hoping to save £750,000 over the next 18 months.

Medical cannabis has been the subject of a number of requests.

== Wales ==
The individual patient funding request system in Wales was reformed in 2017. It will no longer be necessary to show exceptional clinical circumstances, only that a drug will bring "significant clinical benefit" and that it represents "reasonable value for money".
