= Health Navigator =

Health technology company

- Type: Private
- Industry: Health technology
- Founded: 2010
- Founders: Academics from the Karolinska Institute
- Headquarters: London, England, United Kingdom
- Area served: United Kingdom
- Key people: Joachim Werr (CEO)
- Products: Predictive analytics and health coaching services
- Services: Proactive Health Coaching

Health Navigator is a London-based health technology company which was established by academics from the Karolinska Institute in 2010. Dr. Joachim Werr is the chief executive.

It uses analytics and machine learning techniques to identify patients who may benefit from health coaching. People at risk of unplanned hospital admission are offered Proactive Health Coaching, a nurse led service which is intended to help them manage their condition. It is the first company in the UK to use this approach.

The Vale of York CCG set up a randomized control trial with the company, which used artificial intelligence to identify patients at high risk of unplanned hospital attendance. This is part of a trial which is also being run at six other NHS trusts. 1,000 patients treated at York Teaching Hospital NHS Foundation Trust from 2015 to 2019 were targeted. They were given a referral to the company's "Pro-active Health Coaching" service. There was a 36% reduction in A&E attendances and a 25% reduction in planned admissions among those supported. In 2019, the service was extended to 1,800 patients. The CCG is considering extending this type of service into primary care.

A company based in New Zealand – Health Navigator Charitable Trust – has the same name but is not related to the British company.
