= Inclusion Healthcare =

Inclusion Healthcare Social Enterprise CIC Ltd is a Community Interest Company based in Leicester which provides publicly funded health and social care services at two clinics in the city for 900 homeless and vulnerable people.

It was established in September 2010 as part of the Transforming Community Services initiative under the provisions of the Companies (Audit, Investigations and Community Enterprise) Act 2004. A team of 12, who formerly worked for Leicester City Primary Care Trust as Leicester Homeless Healthcare, formed the core of the new organisation. After a year staff employed by the organisation become shareholders, which allows them to make representations at the annual general meeting and be involved in the selection of directors and non-executive directors.

Paymaster General Francis Maude mentioned the organisation at a speech in December 2014 about the Better Care Fund saying the company could provide care without the NHS's "endless process, bureaucracy and auditing". Maude related how the company had helped a homeless man who was too poor to pay for his dog to be looked after while he received hospital treatment for leg ulcers. Inclusion Healthcare wrote "a cheque for £200 or whatever it cost to have the dog vaccinated and put into kennels". According to Maude this payment meant that a very expensive operation to amputate the man's leg was avoided, and there was a further saving on the "massive disability payments" that would have been made over the man's lifetime.

Following a visit from the Care Quality Commission in late 2014, the commission's report published in February 2015 rated the practice as "outstanding".
