= Transforming Community Services =

Transforming Community Services was a programme in the English NHS which operated from 2008 at a national level and continued during the implementation of the Health and Social Care Act 2012. Although the rhetoric of the programme was about improving the quality of community services the reality was mostly concerned with structural changes.

Community services in England did not fit easily into the model of the NHS developed under the National Health Service and Community Care Act 1990 and were repeatedly reorganised. When primary care trusts were established most of the free-standing community NHS trusts were dissolved and taken over by the PCTs – sometimes being divided up in the process. This left the PCTs in the position of both commissioning and providing services. The Transforming Community Services programme encouraged PCTs to divest themselves of their community services.

In some areas community services were transferred to acute hospital trusts or mental health trusts. Nineteen free-standing community health trusts were established up to 2012. in some areas provision was moved to the private sector. Services in Surrey were transferred to Virgin Healthcare. According to Nigel Edwards "Officials gave the strong impression that they would be happy to see the entire community service workforce moved off the NHS payroll, and policy changes were put in place to assist this".

In other areas NHS staff were encouraged to set up a community interest company in the hope that if owned by the nurses and therapists who run the services the organisations would be more imaginative and flexible. Francis Maude praised Inclusion Healthcare, a very small CIC in Leicester, at a speech in December 2014 saying the company could provide care more cheaply and simply than the NHS. He related how Inclusion had helped a homeless man with leg ulcers who was refusing to go into hospital because he could not afford to put his dog in kennels while he was thereby writing "a cheque for £200 or whatever it cost to have the dog vaccinated and put into kennels". According to Maude, the firm said "actually if we had still been in the NHS we could never have done that without endless process and bureaucracy and auditing and which budget does it come out of, and how do we account for it, and it would never have happened”.

Proposals to move services out of the NHS were not always welcomed by patients or staff. In Gloucestershire proposals to set up a social enterprise were abandoned after a Judicial Review brought by a patient backed by a campaign involving both the public and the staff.
