= Commissioning support units =

National Health Service in England units

Commissioning support units were established in April 2013 from the remains of the primary care trusts and strategic health authorities as part of the reorganisation of the National Health Service in England following the Health and Social Care Act 2012.

Twenty-five regional commissioning support units submitted outline business plans in 2012 to NHS England which hosted them. The commissioning support units were largely staffed by former employees of primary care trusts. They were intended to provide support to clinical commissioning groups by providing business intelligence, health and clinical procurement services and other back-office administrative functions, including contract management. The plan was to introduce competition into this market by making them independent businesses from 2016. By May 2014 there had been a number of amalgamations as some clinical commissioning groups brought their commissioning support services in-house.

Greater East Midlands Commissioning Support Unit was criticised by Liz Kendall MP who said it should no longer run NHS continuing healthcare services for patients with complex needs and that it only had one part-time person monitoring the quality of all its home care providers. It announced plans for a merger with NHS Arden CSU in November 2014. Between them they provide specialist support to 37 clinical commissioning groups.

North of England Commissioning Support Unit has expanded some of their services to other areas of the country such as their business intelligence tool RAIDR, which is now deployed in over 20% of GP Practices In England.

The South, South West and Central Southern Commissioning Support Units announced in January 2015 that they planned to merge into a new organisation to be called South, Central and West Commissioning Support which will span Sussex, Cornwall, Gloucestershire and Oxfordshire. The CSUs in the North West and in Yorkshire were not admitted to the NHS procurement framework in February 2015 and NHS England announced that they had no future. Services in Greater Manchester were transferred to Greater Manchester Shared Services.

On 1 April 2017, NHS South East CSU formed a partnership with NHS North and East London CSU (NEL CSU).

On 30 October 2021, NEL CSU ceased to exist.

Seven organisations were accredited to provide CCGs with support:

- NHS North of England CSU;
- NHS Arden and Greater East Midlands CSU;
- NHS Midlands and Lancashire CSU;
- NHS South, Central and West CSU;
- Capita;
- Optum;
- eMBED - a consortium of Mouchel, BDO International, Engine and Dr Foster which took 300 staff from the Yorkshire CSU.

in 2013/4 NHS England paid £125m for services from the 19 CSUs operational in that year. £602m of their income came from clinical commissioning groups, and £80m from “other sources” such as provider trusts and local councils.

A tendering exercise for the services supplied by the Yorkshire and Humber commissioning support unit was delayed in September 2015 because of lack of interest by potential suppliers in the contract, valued at £20 million pa. It appeared that the CCGs were planning to take a lot of the work in house, as the existing contract amounted to £85 million pa.

The North of England Commissioning Support Unit is to be converted into a community interest company owned by the 11 clinical commissioning groups covering the North East and Cumbria.

The North East London Commissioning Support Unit closed in October 2021 and 900 of its staff moved to London Shared Services.

== Commissioning Support for London ==
Commissioning Support for London (CSL) was a shared service of the National Health Service in England. It preceded the national Commissioning support units. Its role was to support London's commissioners – those responsible for planning, developing, monitoring and reviewing health and social care services – to deliver a more efficient healthcare service, share best practice and reduce duplication. Its main focus was on business intelligence services, consultation and training for commissioners. Following a consultation regarding the future of CSL that commenced on 1 December 2010, the organisation was closed on 31 March 2011. London Health Programmes was set up to host several functions of CSL that will continue. These include clinical reviews of London's services, such as mental health and cancer, clinical and health intelligence and the London Health Observatory (LHO).

CSL's work on commissioning skills development and its commercial services products, such as claims and contract management, are no longer provided.
