= Fieldhead Hospital =

- South West Yorkshire Partnership NHS Foundation Trust
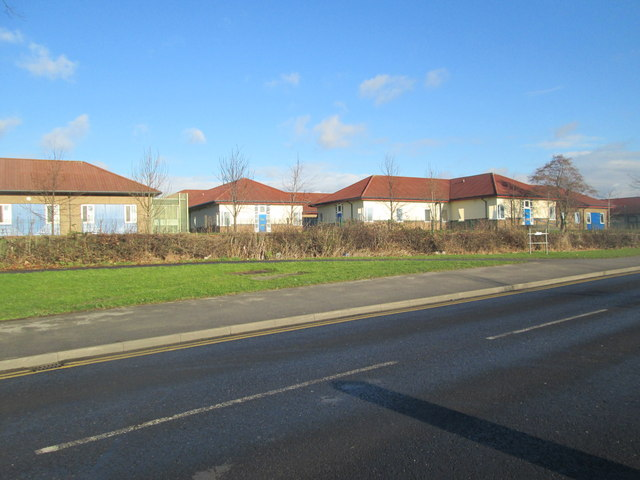
- Fieldhead Hospital

- Shown in West Yorkshire

Geography
- Location: Wakefield, West Yorkshire, England
- Coordinates: 53.6974°N 1.4923°W

Organisation
- Care system: NHS
- Type: Specialist
- Affiliated university: University of Huddersfield

Services
- Emergency department: N/A
- Beds: 208
- Speciality: Psychiatric and Learning Disability Hospital

History
- Founded: 1972

Links
- Website: www.southwestyorkshire.nhs.uk
- Lists: Hospitals in England

Fieldhead Hospital is a psychiatric and learning disability hospital in Wakefield, United Kingdom. It is managed by South West Yorkshire Partnership NHS Foundation Trust.

== History ==
The hospital, which replaced earlier hospitals such as Oulton Hall, Hatfield Hall and Cardigan Hospital, was built at a cost of £2 million and opened by Princess Alexandra on 11 July 1972. The hospital was designed as a series of villas, each named after a local area and each intended to accommodate a category of resident i.e. children, adolescents, adults, geriatrics, or severely disabled.

A medium secure unit, known as Newton Lodge, was built in the north east of the hospital site for mentally disordered offenders in the early 1980s.

The hospital started offering a broader range of psychiatric services, after the Stanley Royd Hospital closed in 1995. A patient with paranoid schizophrenia was charged with murdering a fellow-patient at the hospital in December 1998.

The "Unity Centre", a new building with state of the art therapeutic areas, en-suite bathrooms and vastly improved patient relaxation areas, which was built at a cost of £17 million, was opened in September 2017.

== Mental Health Museum ==
The Mental Health Museum (previously known as the Stephen Beaumont Museum of Mental Health) is located at the hospital. It contains artefacts and exhibits from Stanley Royd Hospital in Wakefield. Artefacts include restraining equipment, a padded cell, photographs, medical and surgical equipment, and documents. There is also a scale model of Stanley Royd Hospital, which was the museum's original location until the hospital closed in 1995.

== See also ==
- List of hospitals in England
