= Birmingham Community Healthcare NHS Foundation Trust =

Healthcare trust in England

- Type: Community health trust
- Established: 30 March 2016
- Chair: David Sallah
- Chief executive: Richard Kirby
- Website: www.bhamcommunity.nhs.uk

Birmingham Community Healthcare NHS Foundation Trust provides a wide range of community health services across Birmingham and the West Midlands, England. It became an NHS Foundation Trust in March 2016.

It planned to merge with Black Country Partnership NHS Foundation Trust and Dudley and Walsall Mental Health Partnership NHS Trust in October 2017. The new organisation was projected to have an annual turnover of around £440 million – making it the third biggest mental health trust in England. The three way merger collapsed but the merger between Black Country and Dudley & Walsall went ahead in April 2020.

== See also ==
- List of NHS trusts
- Healthcare in West Midlands
