= Sustainability and transformation plan =

In England, a sustainability and transformation plan (STP) is a non-statutory requirement which promotes integrated provision of healthcare, including purchasing and commissioning, within each geographical area of the National Health Service. The plans were introduced in 2016 but by 2018 had been overtaken by progress towards integrated care systems.

== Establishment ==
In March 2016, NHS England divided the geographical areas of England into 44 sustainability and transformation plan areas (or footprints) with populations between 300,000 and 3 million, which would implement the Five Year Forward View. These areas were locally agreed between NHS trusts, local authorities and clinical commissioning groups. A leader was appointed for each area, to be responsible for the implementation of the plans which are to be agreed by the component organisations. They were to "work across organisational boundaries to help build a consensus for transformation and the practical steps to deliver it".

== Evolution ==
During 2017 the use of the acronym STP shifted, so that it was used to signify sustainability and transformation partnerships. In February 2018 it was announced that these organisations were in future to be called integrated care systems, and that all 44 sustainability and transformation plans would be expected to progress in this direction. The ten pioneer systems were described as nascent and fragile by the Health Select Committee in May 2018.

By December 2020 only 13 sustainability and transformation partnerships still existed, with 29 transformed into integrated care systems.

== Areas ==
The geographical configuration differs in some respects from previous NHS arrangements – regional hospital boards, regional health authorities and strategic health authorities – because the configurations have been locally agreed, rather than imposed from the centre. When established in 2016, there were 44 STPs which varied considerably in size, the largest having more than ten times greater population than the smallest. By 2019 there were 41, after three STPs in the North East merged.

As of May 2020, the seven NHS England regions have 42 STPs which are at varying stages of progression into integrated care systems.

=== North East and Yorkshire ===
- South Yorkshire and Bassetlaw STP
- Humber, Coast and Vale STP
- West Yorkshire and Harrogate (Health & Care Partnership) STP
- Cumbria and North East STP

=== North West ===
- Cheshire and Merseyside STP
- Greater Manchester Health and Social Care Partnership
- Healthier Lancashire and South Cumbria

=== Midlands ===
- Joined Up Care Derbyshire STP
- Staffordshire and Stoke-on-Trent STP
- Shropshire and Telford and Wrekin STP
- Nottingham and Nottinghamshire Health and Care STP
- Herefordshire and Worcestershire STP
- Birmingham and Solihull STP
- The Black Country and West Birmingham STP
- Coventry and Warwickshire STP
- Lincolnshire STP
- Leicester, Leicestershire and Rutland STP
- Northamptonshire STP

=== East of England ===
- Mid and South Essex STP
- Bedfordshire, Luton and Milton Keynes STP
- Suffolk and North East Essex STP
- Hertfordshire and West Essex STP
- Norfolk and Waveney Health & Care Partnership (STP)
- Cambridgeshire and Peterborough STP

=== London ===
- Our Healthier South East London STP
- East London Health & Care Partnership (STP)
- North London Partners in Health & Care (STP)
- North West London Health & Care Partnership (STP)
- South West London Health & Care Partnership (STP)

=== South East ===
- Frimley Health & Care ICS (STP)
- Hampshire and the Isle of Wight STP
- Buckinghamshire, Oxfordshire and Berkshire West STP
- Kent and Medway STP
- Sussex and East Surrey STP
- Surrey Heartlands Health & Care Partnership (STP)

=== South West ===
- Devon STP
- Somerset STP
- Cornwall and the Isles of Scilly Health & Social Care Partnership (STP)
- Dorset STP
- Bath and North East Somerset, Swindon and Wiltshire STP
- Gloucestershire STP
- Bristol, North Somerset and South Gloucestershire STP

== Staffing ==
As of 2016, three of the leaders are from local government: Sir Howard Bernstein, chief executive of Manchester City Council; David Pearson, director of adult social care at Nottingham City Council; and Mark Rogers, chief executive of Birmingham City Council and president of the Society of Local Authority Chief Executives and Senior Managers. The remainder are NHS managers.

== Finance ==
The NHS planning guidance for 2016–17 stated: "For many years now, the NHS has emphasised an organisational separation and autonomy that doesn’t make sense to staff or the patients and communities they serve… System leadership is needed." It also suggested that the financial problems of individual organisations are no longer critical: "what is important is the financial situation of the organisations in each area considered together". Each area was required to produce a Sustainability and Transformation Plan by end of June 2016.

In February 2017 the National Audit Office produced a report suggesting that plans to save millions of pounds "may be optimistic", that there was poor oversight of the various initiatives and that progress with integration plans had been slower and less successful than planned. £5.3 billion spent through the Better Care Fund in 2015/16 had not delivered value for money. Furthermore, there was "no compelling evidence" to suggest that integration would lead to financial savings or less use of acute hospitals.

£325 million capital funding for the strongest plans was announced in March 2017 but Sir Robert Naylor concluded that at least £10 billion would be needed to deliver proposed plans and make NHS facilities fit for purpose. His review suggested that £6 billion could be raised by selling NHS land and buildings.

== Development ==
Simon Stevens described the progress made in December 2016, saying that the most advanced areas were "capable of combining the purchaser and provider, the commissioning and provider function, a la Frimley Health”. In some cases he expected a "governance partnership of the relevant statutory bodies" which in some cases might become integrated organisations. But in some areas there were only proposals, not yet progressed into plans. He proposed to give the most advanced money and authority to progress their plans. NHS England would organise national support programmes, particularly for “primary care provider development”, support urgent and emergency care systems, rather than to individual organisations, and set up clinical standardisation and productivity initiatives under professors Timothy Briggs and Tim Evans.

Plans released in March 2017 propose at that all plans should evolve into accountable care systems with "clear collective responsibility for resources and population health" and some control over devolved funding for mental health, cancer and general practice. Between six and ten STP areas are to be launched as accountable care systems.

A survey by the Chartered Institute of Public Finance and Accountancy in September 2017 found that of 56 organisations who responded to a survey, 55 did not believe that joint working between local government and health organisations would be fully achieved in the next 5 years. They also found that there was no funding for plans to increase preventative work.

== Accountability ==
Steven Broomhead, the chief executive of Warrington Borough Council, complained to NHS England in July 2016 that decisions were being made "without any local transparency". He said changes to where people receive services and what services they receive needed "local scrutiny and local community involvement".

== Care in the community ==
It is planned to transfer patients to care in the community. This may lead to improved care in some cases but the King's Fund claims not all community care plans are credible because there are insufficient services outside hospitals and there is insufficient money to provide more. The King's Fund fears reducing hospital beds will increase the strain on hospital services which were overstretched during the 2016–2017 winter. Professor Chris Ham of King's Fund maintains transferring services to the community is a potential improvement in many cases and plans should be considered on their merits. Ham maintains further transfer to the community cannot be done without extra funding and urges the government to invest in community services. The Nuffield Trust reported that some STPs were planning up to 30% reductions in some areas of hospital activity - going against trends which have persisted for the last 30 years. They conclude that out-of-hospital care may be better for patients, but it is not likely to be cheaper for the NHS in the short to medium term.

== Reaction to proposals ==
According to Dr Brian Fisher, "STPs are driven by the Treasury. They are focused on reducing NHS spend. (...) Unless STPs meet the funding demands of the Treasury, the plans will not be approved and areas will not receive any transformation money." An article by the King's Fund states, "Allocations from the fund for sustainability and transformation must be agreed in advance with HM Treasury and DH’." The same article states that the spending review, "is both ring-fenced and needs HM Treasury agreement to unlock."

The Nuffield Trust think tank claims many suggestions would fail to implement government financial targets and involve a "dauntingly large implementation task". Sally Gainsbury of the Nuffield Trust said many current plans involve shifting or closing services... "Our research finds that, in a lot of these kinds of reconfigurations, you don't save very much money - all that happens is the patient has to go to the next hospital down the road. They're more inconvenienced... but it rarely saves the money that's needed." There will be a shift from inpatient to outpatient care but critics fear cuts that could put lives at risk, that the plans dismantle the health service rather than protecting it, further that untested plans put less mobile, vulnerable people at risk. By contrast, NHS England claims that the plans bring joined-up care closer to home. John Lister of Keep Our NHS Public said there are too many assumptions, and managers desperate to cut deficits were resorting to untried plans. A survey of ninety-nine clinical commissioning group chairs and accountable officers conducted by the Health Service Journal in October 2016 found very little confidence that the plans would deliver.

An article in The Guardian by an anonymous NHS manager suggests possible substantial benefits from the plans. The system as a whole lacks money and an ageing English population has growing complex requirements. Health and social services need to be coordinated, STP's got people working enthusiastically together. The article suggests NHS England 'made up the policy on the hoof' and managers were under pressure to produce plans fast. NHS England gave fragmented guidance, coming in bursts with frequently insufficient time for responding to requests. There are fears secrecy within the NHS is hindering effective public discussion and without public discussion there is a risk of later delays, protests, judicial reviews. The author argues that full-time leaders are needed who will not put the interests of their own department before the needs of the whole and will send money where it is needed. Another Guardian article questions whether the plan might be to prepare for greater privatisation after 2020. Transferring services from hospitals to the community will only work if there is spare capacity in the community and GP's are already overstretched. There are too few NHS staff generally to enable the reorganisation.

Critics are concerned that the plan will involve cuts but supporters insist some services will be cut while others will be enhanced. Senior Liberal Democrat MP Norman Lamb accepted that the review made sense in principle but stated: "It would be scandalous if the government simply hoped to use these plans as an excuse to cut services and starve the NHS of the funding it desperately needs. While it is important that the NHS becomes more efficient and sustainable for future generations, redesign of care models will only get us so far – and no experts believe the Conservative doctrine that an extra £8bn funding by 2020 will be anywhere near enough."

Plans were generally kept secret until December 2016. 43 out of 44 were published by December 2016. Oxfordshire, Buckinghamshire and Berkshire was, at that stage, still in dispute. One local manager described keeping plans confidential as 'ludicrous' and another said the 'wrong judgement call' had been made. Another person spoke about being in meetings where, 'real people' like patients and the public were not involved. The King's Fund reported the public and patients were mostly absent from plans potentially involving large scale service closing. Chris Ham of the King's Fund described suggesting out-of-hospital services and GP's could take over work now done by hospitals as a “heroic assumption” since both are under too much pressure. Some councils that disagree with the secrecy have published plans on their websites. Funds that should have gone to easing transition of services after closures instead went to plugging other NHS deficits.

Sir Bruce Keogh defended the process in December 2016 saying "I think in a number of areas, {services} will look very different. But what we have to be really careful about is that they serve the needs of patients and the local community. People are always up for change, but they fear loss, and I think that those who are proposing the change have a duty to explain to the local communities why those changes offer an improvement."

Organisers of a protest march in London where tens of thousands of people took part fear the Sustainability Transformation Plans are a "smokescreen for further cuts". Hospital services could be cut in nearly two thirds of England and some hospitals will be completely closed. During the march Jeremy Corbyn said, “There are those waiting on trolleys and those who are desperate to get into an A&E department waiting hours for treatment. It is not the fault of the staff. It is the fault of a government who have made a political choice.” Corbyn also said, "The Tories and the coalition before them managed to cut taxes on big business. Don't let them tell you there's no money for the NHS. There's no excuse for it... the money is there if you collect the taxes properly to fund it and pay for it." Len McCluskey of Unite stated, hospitals, GPs, mental health, ambulance and community services are on their knees". Dr David Wrigley of the BMA said, "As a doctor I see day to day the serious pressures in the NHS due to the funding cuts from the government."

There is concern that plans are being introduced hastily without evidence that they will be effective. Dr Mark Porter of the BMA said money was "wasted" and changes "rushed through without appropriate evidence". According to the Local Government Association only 21% of councillors they surveyed in 2017 felt sufficiently engaged in their STPs, and less than 25% were confident that their STP would deliver on its objectives or bring benefits to the local community.

The King's Fund in September 2017 described plans to cut hospital beds as ‘undesirable and unachievable’, pointing out that the UK has fewer acute beds relative to its population than almost any other comparable health system.

According to Sir David Sloman the purpose of these plans is to focus on population health – helping people to achieve their maximum potential – rather than treating people when they get sick.

== Legal considerations ==
STPs are not statutory organisations so any changes resulting from the plans most be implemented by their component bodies, and those bodies may be required to conduct public or staff consultations, or, in the case of foundation trusts, ballot their governors. Local authorities have the power to call decisions in for scrutiny. The Health and Social Care Act 2012 provisions may also require approval of proposals from the Competition and Markets Authority.
