= Pulse (magazine) =

British magazine for general practitioners

- Editor: Jaimie Kaffash
- Categories: Medicine
- Frequency: Monthly
- Publisher: Cogora Ltd
- Founded: 1960
- Country: United Kingdom
- Website: pulsetoday.co.uk

Pulse is a monthly news magazine and website on British primary health care. It has been distributed without charge to general practitioners in the United Kingdom since 1960. Its stories are regularly picked up by national and regional newspapers.

It is one of a number of magazines often referred to by GPs as "the comics".

== History ==
In 2000, the title was owned by Miller Freeman UK which went through some restructuring; the part of the business that continued to own Pulse was known as United Business Media (UBM). In February 2012, UBM sold its agriculture and medical portfolios, including Pulse Media Ltd to the founders of Briefing Media for £10 million, with the new business being known as Briefing Media Group.

Pulse was bought by Cogora, an 'integrated media and marketing services' company in November 2013.

== Digital presence ==
Pulse is the name of the print version of the magazine, while the website is called PulseToday.

An award-winning app called 'Pulse Toolkit' provides GPs with clinical tools.

== Articles picked up by national media ==
Pulse carries surveys of GP opinions. In 2005 its report that when more than 1,000 GPs were asked about their voting intentions, only one in 10 said they intended to vote Labour was reported prominently by the Daily Telegraph. In 2007 its report that 19% of 309 GPs surveyed said they did not believe abortion should be legal was picked up by the Daily Mail and the Evening Standard.

In 2015, a report into NHS England's personal health budget scheme was picked up by the BBC, and The Guardian among other publications.

== Awards ==
- Magazine of the Year 2014 in the Professional Publishers Association Awards
- Digital Innovation of the Year 2015 for the Pulse Toolkit App in the Medical Journalism Association Awards
- Business Magazine of the Year 2016 in the Professional Publishers Association Awards
