= Black Country Healthcare NHS Foundation Trust =

Healthcare trust in England

- Former name: Black Country Partnership NHS Foundation Trust
- Type: Mental health trust
- Established: 1 April 2020
- Headquarters: Civic Centre, St Peter's Square, Wolverhampton, WV1 1SH
- Chair: Philip Gayle
- Chief executive: Marsha Foster
- Website: www.blackcountryhealthcare.nhs.uk

Black Country Healthcare NHS Foundation Trust is an NHS foundation trust which provides specialist mental health, learning disability, and community healthcare services for the population of the Black Country.

The trust was established on 1 April 2020 after merging Black Country Partnership NHS Foundation Trust and Dudley and Walsall Mental Health Partnership NHS Trust.

Marsha Foster has been chief executive since January 2023 and Philip Gayle has been chairman since December 2024. Half the board members are black and minority ethnic, the only trust in England to achieve that.

== History ==
The Black Country Partnership NHS Foundation Trust (BCPFT) was formed on the 1 April 2011. Formerly the Sandwell Mental Health and Social Care Foundation Trust, the name change signified a broader range of services across the region.

The trust was given £89,000 from the Nursing Technology Fund in March 2014 which is to be spent on mobile devices.

The trust, together with Dudley and Walsall Mental Health Partnership NHS Trust has set up a Liaison and Diversion service. The intention is that "when someone in a police station, or involved in court proceedings, has a mental health problem or other vulnerabilities, they are referred to the right services and are given support and guidance based on their needs."

An inspection by the Care Quality Commission in 2016 found that Abbey ward, Charlemont ward and Friar ward at Hallam Street Hospital, West Bromwich all had blind spots. The wards were said to be in a 'poor state' with stained and damaged walls, carpets and furniture and an 'unpleasant odour throughout the ward areas'. They found a number of areas of good practice. "This included how young people were involved in making decisions about their care and that the trust had also employed a nurse who spoke four Asian languages to lead on work with black and minority ethnic communities."

A planned merger with Birmingham Community Healthcare NHS Foundation Trust and Dudley and Walsall Mental Health Partnership NHS Trust was scheduled for October 2017. The new organisation would have an annual turnover of around £440 million – making it the third biggest mental health trust in England. The three way merger collapsed but the merger with Dudley and Walsall was completed in April 2020, forming Black Country Healthcare NHS Foundation Trust.

In 2024, the Dudley Integrated Health and Care NHS Trust was dissolved, with all staff, services and property being transferred to the Trust.

== See also ==
- List of NHS trusts
