= Health Service Journal =

British health management news

- Editor: Alastair McLellan
- Categories: Digital healthcare news publication
- Format: Online
- Founded: 1892; 134 years ago
- Company: HSJ Information Limited
- Country: United Kingdom
- Based in: Aldgate, London
- Language: English
- Website: www.hsj.co.uk
- ISSN: 0952-2271

Health Service Journal (HSJ) is a news service that covers policy and management in the National Health Service (NHS) in England.

== History ==
The Poor Law Officers' Journal was established in 1892. In 1930, it changed its name after the passing of the Local Government Act 1929 to the Public Assistance Journal and Health and Hospital Review, then in 1948, it became the Hospital and Social Service Journal. In 1963, it became the Hospital and Social Service Review, in 1973, the Health and Social Service Journal, and the Health Service Journal in 1986. It was part of a group of business-to-business titles published by the Emap group, which was purchased by the Guardian Media Group in 2008.^{[3]}

In 2008, it had an average circulation of almost 18,000 copies, most of which were by subscription. It was part of a group of business-to-business titles published by the Emap group, which was purchased by the Guardian Media Group in 2008. In October 2015, the title's owners announced that print editions would be phased out over the following 18 months, with the HSJ expected to be in the first tranche. In January 2017, the title was bought by Wilmington plc for £19 million.

In 2016, HSJ announced that it would go digital only, giving insight into every NHS sector and region. In January 2017 the title was bought by Wilmington plc for £19 million.^{[5]}

In February 2024 Wilmington announced it was looking to sell the HSJ brand in order to align more closely with its core governance, risk and compliance (GRC) portfolio. In June 2024, HSJ was sold to Inspirit Franklin Holdings Ltd.

== Content ==
Primarily aimed at "healthcare leaders", it covers subject areas including commissioning, performance, patient safety, finance, mental health and technology.

== Awards ==
At the 2013 Professional Publishers' Association awards editor Alastair McLellan was named editor of the year in the business media category. In 2014, HSJ was named PPA business magazine of the year. McLellan was editor of the year again in 2020. In 2021 at the AOP Digital Publishing Awards the magazine won the grand prix award for best specialist online brand, and specialist editorial team of the year. Alastair McLellan won editor of the year. The British Society of Modern Magazine Editors named him Editor of the Year - Trade & Professional in January 2022.
