= Clinical commissioning group =

English NHS organisations

Clinical commissioning group boundaries in England

Clinical commissioning groups (CCGs) were National Health Service (NHS) organisations set up by the Health and Social Care Act 2012 to replace strategic health authorities and primary care trusts to organise the delivery of NHS services in each of their local areas in England. On 1 July 2022, they were abolished and replaced by integrated care systems as a result of the Health and Care Act 2022.

== Establishment ==
The announcement that GPs would take over this commissioning role was made in the 2010 white paper "Equity and Excellence: Liberating the NHS". This was part of the government's stated desire to create a clinically driven commissioning system that was more sensitive to the needs of patients. The 2010 white paper became law under the Health and Social Care Act 2012 in March 2012. At the end of March 2013 there were 211 CCGs, but a series of mergers had reduced the number to 135 by April 2020.

To a certain extent they replaced primary care trusts (PCTs), though some of the staff and responsibilities moved to local authority public health teams when PCTs ceased to exist in April 2013. Services directly provided by PCTs were reorganised through the Transforming Community Services programme.

== Structure and membership ==
Clinical commissioning groups (CCGs) were clinically led groups which included all of the GP groups in their geographical area. They worked with patients and healthcare professionals and in partnership with local communities and local authorities. On their governing body, each group had, in addition to GPs, at least one registered nurse and a doctor who was a secondary care specialist from an area not covered by the CCG's boundaries. The aim of this was to give GPs and other clinicians the power to influence commissioning decisions for their patients. The Health and Social Care Act 2012 provided that the areas specified in the constitutions of clinical commissioning groups together cover the whole of England, and did not coincide or overlap. CCGs were overseen by NHS England including its Regional Offices and Area Teams. These structures managed primary care commissioning, including holding the NHS Contracts for GP practices NHS.

Each CCG had a constitution and was run by its governing body. Each had to have an accountable officer responsible for the CCG's duties, functions, finance and governance. Most CCGs initially appointed former primary care trust managers to these posts. However, by October 2014, only a quarter of accountable officers were GPs, whereas 80% of CCG Chairs were GPs. By November 2014 only half of GP practices said they felt involved in CCG decision-making processes.

Unite the Union surveyed the 3,392 CCG board members in 2015 and reported that 513 were directors of private healthcare companies: 140 owned such businesses and 105 carried out external work for them. More than 400 CCG board members were shareholders in such companies. The King's Fund and the Nuffield Trust ran a survey of GPs in six areas of England in 2016 and found that more than 70% were at least "somewhat" engaged with the work of their CCG, though only 20% of those without a formal role in their CCG said they could influence the work of their CCG if they chose to.

=== Mergers ===
In 2013, 211 groups were established and there was resistance to any proposals for mergers between groups. On 1 April 2015 Gateshead CCG, Newcastle North & East CCG and Newcastle West CCG merged, yet in the same year, Lakeside Healthcare applied to move from Corby CCG where it had two-thirds of the registered population to Nene CCG, but Nene refused to accept it. During 2016 it appeared that further mergers would be permitted, and in November 2016 NHS England published an official procedure. In March 2017, 83 CCGs were sharing chief officers as a precursor to merger. During 2017 mergers between CCGs began, having previously been forbidden. As of August 2017 GPs in Staffordshire submitted a vote of no confidence in their local CCGs in protest against a proposed merger. The merger between Liverpool, South Sefton and Southport and Formby CCGs was stopped while an investigation into Liverpool CCG's governance and management of conflicts of interest was carried out, leading to the resignation of several of its leaders. There were similar investigations in Hackney, London and Crawley.

As of April 2018, the largest CCG in England was created following the merger of NHS Birmingham Cross-City, Birmingham South Central and Solihull CCGs. The newly formed NHS Birmingham and Solihull CCG became responsible for commissioning services for over 1.3 million patients.

In November 2018, NHS England announced that the administration budgets of CCGs were to be cut by 20% and that mergers, which would be approved, were a good way of saving money. For 2020, 86 mergers were planned; 45% of the existing 191 groups. As of April 2020 there were 135 CCGs.

On 1 April 2021, 38 CCGs merged to form 9 new CCGs.

=== Relationship with local councils ===
In October 2017, it was announced that Brighton and Hove Clinical Commissioning Group were to merge some services with those provided by Brighton and Hove City Council, via a Health and Social Care Integration Board. The board was to commence work in April 2018 and provide full service a year later, preventing duplication of health and social care within the city. In December 2017 the ten CCGs in Greater Manchester were in various stages of establishing a "single commissioning function" with their council.

== Duties and responsibilities ==
Each CCG was responsible for persons who were provided with primary medical services by a member of the group, and persons who usually reside in the group's area and were not provided with primary medical services by a member of any clinical commissioning group. CCGs operated by commissioning (or planning, buying and monitoring) healthcare services including:

- Most community health services
- Elective hospital care
- Rehabilitation care
- Urgent and emergency care
- Mental health and learning disability services
- Individual funding requests in their area.

Clinical commissioning groups were responsible for arranging emergency and urgent care services within their boundaries, and for commissioning services for any unregistered patients who live in their area. All GP practices had to belong to a clinical commissioning group. The area of the CCG had to all be within one top-tier local authority.

=== Primary care ===
As originally established, CCGs did not have any responsibility for primary care which was commissioned and managed by NHS England, but in November 2014 they were invited to become co-commissioners of primary care in their area, responsible for the performance management and budgets of their member GP practices, including managing complaints about practices and GPs.

A delegated commissioning model was piloted from 2015: as of April 2015, 63 were to take on fully-delegated responsibility and 87 were to begin "joint commissioning", which involved less responsibility. In 2017 it was proposed that most CCGs should take responsibility for GP contracts, as the early adopters had done well and it was "critical to local sustainability and transformation planning". As of October they were also to be able to establish new practices, approve mergers and manage discretionary payments.

== Operation ==
In November 2014, the London Borough of Tower Hamlets Clinical Commissioning Group, chaired by Sam Everington, was awarded Clinical Commissioning Group of the year by the Health Service Journal for "strong leadership, especially around clinical leadership, while retaining patient focus."

In May 2015, a study conducted by the Open University and University College London found that clinical leaders "seemed to be more willing to challenge or ignore diktats and messages from above, and to encourage their managerial colleagues to do the same". Clinical leaders were more "focused on outcomes and less interested in processes. They don't really mind how they do things as long as they feel they're having an impact". Having the option of returning to full-time clinical practice meant that clinicians felt a "degree of freedom in what they say and do".

In April 2018, in a dispute brought by City of Wolverhampton Council against Shropshire and South Worcestershire CCGs over their failure to meet the continuing healthcare costs for a patient with learning disabilities, Mr Justice Garnham ruled that a CCG could not pay for treatment of a patient registered with a general practitioner outside their area.

=== Funding ===
In 2018/19, £74.2 billion was distributed among the 195 CCGs in England, equivalent to £1,254 per registered patient. The funding formula allocates more money to CCGs with elderly populations, in urban areas, or in more deprived areas. The highest allocation per patient was £1,645 for Knowsley and the lowest £1,040 for Oxfordshire. Funding per head increased in real terms by 2% a year between 2013/14 and 2018/19.

== Commissioning ==
In 2015, the Centre for Health and the Public Interest estimated that in 2013–14 there were about 53,000 contracts between the NHS in England and the private sector, including contracts for primary care services, of which the 211 CCGs held 15,000 with an annual value of about £9.3bn. They sent Freedom of Information requests to all 211 CCGs, seeking information about how they monitor contracts with private providers and concluded that CCGs failed to manage contracts with private providers effectively.

According to Christian Mazzi, head of health at Bain & Company, in September 2015 70% of CCGs had failed to monitor their private sector contracts or enforce quality standards. 12% had not carried out any visits to private providers, and 60% could not say if they had done so.

In April 2013, NHS England established 25 commissioning support units to provide a variety of support functions, largely staffed by former employees of the primary care trusts. All CCGs were told that they must procure support services by a tender process by April 2015. The first tender, by South Lincolnshire and South West Lincolnshire CCGs was won by OptumHealth with a value of £3 million a year for three years. By 2017 the number of commissioning support lists had been reduced to eight.

=== Incentives and referrals ===
In September 2015 at least 9 CCGs had set up "ethically questionable" incentive schemes to persuade GPs to reduce referrals for new outpatient attendances, follow-ups, A&E attendances and emergency admissions with payments per practice of up to £11,000. Chaand Nagpaul, of the British Medical Association, condemned them as "a financial contaminant" to patient-doctor trust. The General Medical Council guidance, Financial and commercial arrangements and conflicts of interest provides that a doctor should "not allow any interests you have to affect the way you prescribe for, treat, refer or commission services for patients" but the council accepted that "Finance and other incentives can be an effective way of driving improvements in healthcare."

=== Service restrictions ===
An April 2015 survey of CCGs by the Health Service Journal found that more than a third were planning to save money by restricting access to services, i.e. health care rationing, particularly on "procedures of limited effectiveness", podiatry, in vitro fertilisation, and limiting access to procedures based on aspects of a patient's health, for example whether they smoke or are obese, which can affect outcomes.

A similar July 2015 survey by the GP magazine Pulse, found that many CCGs were planning to restrict access to routine care in various ways.

Another Health Service Journal survey in September 2015 showed that 34 of 188 CCGs who responded to the survey had restricted access to some services. Restrictions were usually introduced by a number of CCGs acting together across an area. Nottinghamshire CCGs had restricted access to surgery for sleep apnoea and hysterectomy for heavy menstrual bleeding, fat grafts, hair depilation, earlobe repair, and chin, cheek or collagen implants.

=== Response to 2020–2022 pandemic ===
In view of the coronavirus pandemic, on 23 and 27 March 2020 the Secretary of State for Health and Social Care directed the NHS Commissioning Board to buy services from the private sector, thereby bypassing CCGs. The directive also allowed NHS England to exercise functions normally carried out by CCGs, as the Board deemed appropriate. The directive had an initial expiry at the end of 2020, which was extended in stages to 31 March 2022.

== Regulation and judicial review ==
All CCGs had to go through an authorisation process. Between July and December 2012, there were four waves of authorisation .

In 2014 NHS England investigated Wirral Clinical Commissioning Group after Birkenhead MP Frank Field raised concerns about it. They found that the chair and chief clinical officer "did not demonstrate the necessary close working agreement" about what needed to change within the CCG. There were also questions about the relationship senior leaders had with Arrowe Park Hospital. After the report was published Field repeated his calls for the senior officers to stand aside while a new constitution is made for the governance of the group.

In October 2014 it was reported that NHS England were considering a special measures regime for CCGs in difficulties, of which there were said to be about a dozen. Under the assurance framework, CCGs were rated as "assured", "assured with support" or "not assured". Only Barnet CCG was rated "not assured". Guidance issued in August 2015 provided that if CCGs were in special measures for more than a year, NHS England could "trigger changes in the management, governance or structure of the CCG's responsibilities, with the potential for other CCGs or relevant bodies to take over aspects of the local commissioner's responsibilities". At that time, none had been placed in special measures.

In November 2015, Shropshire Clinical Commissioning Group was put in special measures after its financial position deteriorated. It expected an in-year deficit of £10.6 million for 2015/6. In September 2017, 23 CCGs were rated inadequate by NHS England for 2016–17, five were given legal directions and two, Lewisham and Greenwich, were ordered to "cease to exercise its acute commissioning functions, including the contract with Lewisham and Greenwich NHS Trust" until April 2019.

Bristol CCG were subject to a legal challenge from a local pressure group, Protect Our NHS, who claimed that their processes for involving patients and the public in their decisions were inadequate. A judicial review was withdrawn in June 2014 after the CCG agreed to amend its patient and public involvement strategy and other documents.

== See also ==
- Category:Healthcare in England by county for local commissioning issues
