= Local Nature Partnership =

Local Nature Partnerships (LNPs) are partnerships of a broad range of influential organisations, businesses and people, and from a range of sectors, charged by government with the task of bringing about improvements in their local natural environment in England. To achieve this they are expected to ensure that consideration for the environment is put right at the heart of local decision-making.

Local Nature Partnerships originated in a vision set out in the UK government's 2011 ‘Natural Environment White Paper’, which identified the need to take greater account of the value of the environment when strategic decisions are made that affect people and the local economy.

The overall purpose of an LNP is to:

- Drive positive change in the local natural environment, taking a strategic view of the challenges and opportunities involved and identifying ways to manage it as a system for the benefit of nature, people and the economy.
- Contribute to achieving the Government's national environmental objectives locally, including the identification of local ecological networks, alongside addressing local priorities.
- Become local champions influencing decision-making relating to the natural environment and its value to social and economic outcomes, in particular, through working closely with local authorities, Local Enterprise Partnerships (LEPs) and Health and Wellbeing Boards.

As of August 2014 there were 48 LNPs in England which had received formal approval from the Department for Environment, Food and Rural Affairs.

== History ==
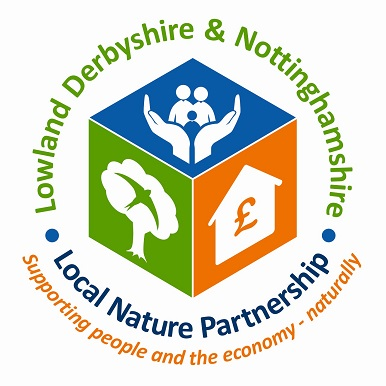
Example of a Local Nature Partnership logo: Lowland Derbyshire & Nottinghamshire LNP

Local Nature Partnerships were formed as part of the UK Coalition Government's response to Sir John Lawton's 2010 report "Making Space for Nature". They were then brought into law via the Natural Environment White Paper, the first natural environment government White Paper in 20 years. Each LNP would be a locally formed, high-level forum, equivalent in status to Local Enterprise Partnerships (LEPs), which would work in a joined up and strategic way to drive positive change in the environment and to produce multiple benefits for people, the economy and the environment. There is now virtually complete coverage by Local nature Partnerships across England.

In March 2015 the House of Commons Environmental Audit Committee held an investigation into the state of LNPs across England, producing a report to government. Its key findings were:

- The next Government should undertake an early review of the LNP programme, to identify an agenda for action linked to other nature conservation initiatives with approaching deadlines.
- examine LNPs' funding and their links to Local Enterprise Partnerships, Health & Wellbeing Boards and Local Planning Authorities
- Identify and share best practice from the successful LNPs, plus any barriers to success.

In September 2015, the UK Government published their response to the Audit Committee report. The principle findings were that:

- the Government accepts the recommendation to undertake a review of LNPs (looking specifically at funding, planning authorities, Health and Wellbeing Boards and other stakeholders, plus links with Local Enterprise Partnerships and the metrics and methods for disbursement of European Structural Investment Funds (ESIF)).
- Defra's provision of non-financial support is crucial to LNP credibility, directly affecting a Partnership's local standing and ability to draw in local and national/EU funding.
- local delivery of environmental enhancements is a key component of the government's 25-year plan for the environment.
- the review of LNPs should be linked to the EU Commission's 'Fitness Check' of the Habitats Directive and Birds Directive.

In 2015 Defra also held an annual meeting with senior Local Nature Partnerships representatives in London. Themes addressed included the need for better networking between LNPs, Natural Capital, the government's National Pollinator Strategy, and Health and wellbeing.
