= Simon Stevens =

British health manager and civil servant

The Right Honourable The Lord Stevens of Birmingham Kt
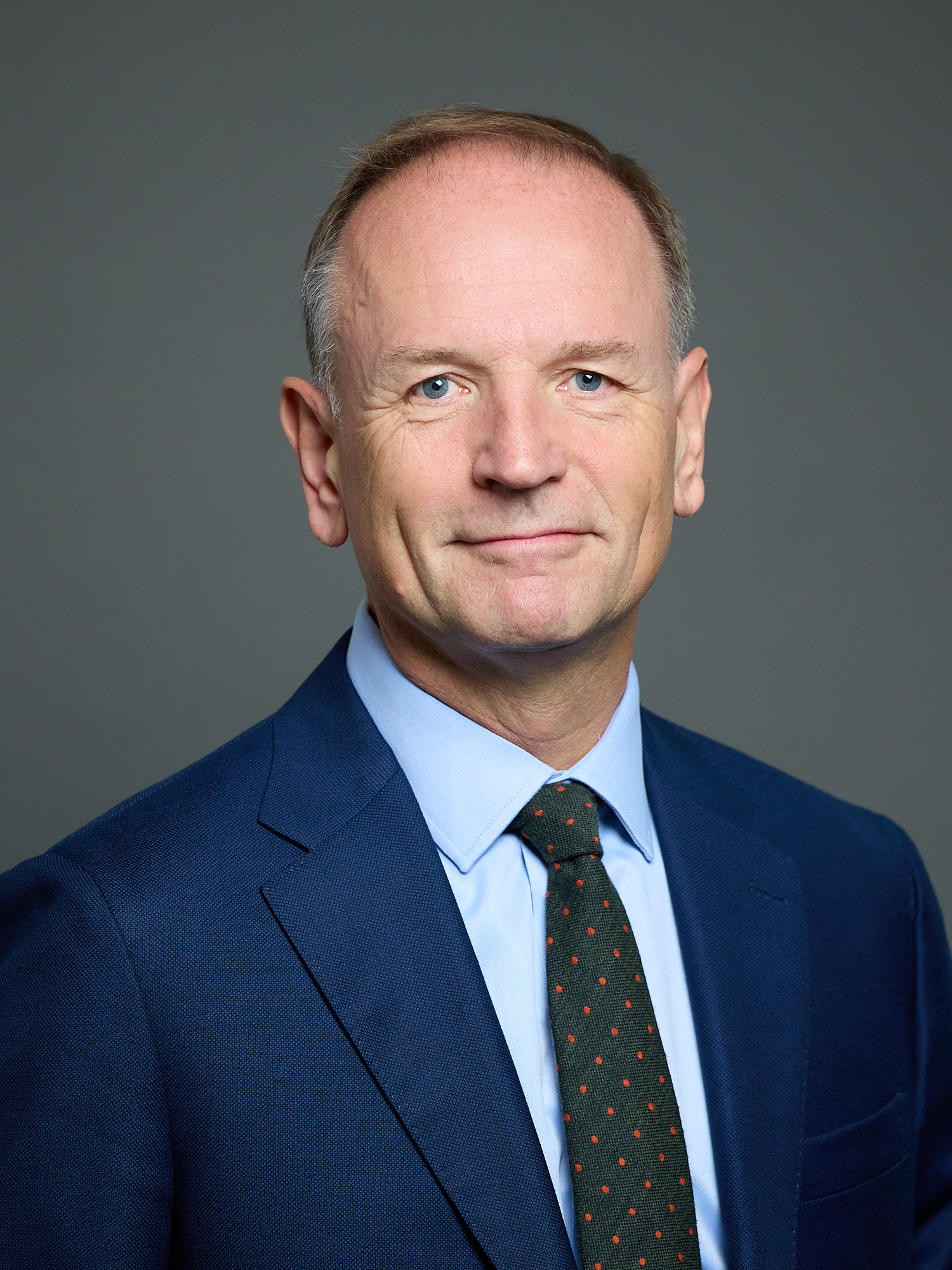
- Official portrait, 2025

Member of the House of Lords
- Lord Temporal
- Life peerage 5 July 2021

Chief Executive of NHS England
- In office 1 April 2014 – 31 July 2021
- Preceded by: Sir David Nicholson
- Succeeded by: Amanda Pritchard

Lambeth Borough Councillor for Angell Ward, Brixton
- In office 7 May 1998 – 2 May 2002

Personal details
- Born: Simon Laurence Stevens; 4 August 1966 (age 60) Shard End, Birmingham, England
- Party: None (crossbencher) (2021–present)
- Other political affiliations: Labour (1990s-2000s)
- Education: Balliol College, Oxford (MA); University of Strathclyde (MBA)
- Awards: Knight Bachelor

Simon Laurence Stevens, Baron Stevens of Birmingham (born 4 August 1966) is Chair of the UK Maritime and Coastguard Agency, Chair of Cancer Research UK, Chair of King's College London, and an independent member of the House of Lords. In Parliament he focuses on defence and international relations (particularly maritime issues), science, the environment, health, and higher education policy. Stevens was for seven years previously Chief Executive of NHS England. Earlier in his career he was senior policy adviser to the Prime Minister, a senior executive in the private sector, and worked internationally including in Guyana, Malawi, and the United States.

== Current work ==
Stevens is Chair of the Maritime and Coastguard Agency, which regulates British shipping, the wider UK maritime sector and runs HM Coastguard search and rescue services for the United Kingdom. He is Chair of the governing council of King's College London. He is Chair of Cancer Research UK, the world's largest independent funder of cancer science. He is a crossbench peer.

== Early and personal life ==
Simon Stevens was born in Birmingham, England, the son of a Baptist minister and a university administrator. He was educated at a state comprehensive, St Bartholomew's School in Newbury, Berkshire, and won a scholarship to Balliol College, Oxford, where he was elected president of the Oxford Union. Stevens later received an MBA from the University of Strathclyde, Glasgow and was a Harkness Fellow at Columbia University, New York. His wife, Maggie, is a public health specialist from New York City. Their son was born on Christmas Day 2003 at St Thomas' Hospital and their daughter in 2008. He lists his hobbies as family, sailing, books and "cooking without recipes". He regularly competes in offshore yacht races such as the Rolex Sydney-Hobart and the Rolex Fastnet Race.

== Early career ==
After university, Stevens first worked in Guyana, and then from 1988 to 1997 as a healthcare manager in the UK and internationally. He started his NHS career on the NHS Graduate Management Training Scheme at Shotley Bridge General Hospital, the largest employer in Consett, County Durham, after the closure of the steel works. After a spell in Congo and Malawi, he became general manager for a large NHS psychiatric hospital outside Newcastle-upon-Tyne, and ran community mental health services for North Tyneside and Northumberland. He was then appointed group manager of Guy's and St Thomas' hospitals in London before moving to New York City Health Department.

== Government ==
Stevens served as a senior government policy adviser for seven years from 1997 to 2004: first to successive Secretaries of State for Health at the UK Department of Health, and then as senior policy adviser in the Number 10 Policy Unit to Prime Minister Tony Blair. He was closely associated with the development of the NHS Plan 2000. He was also an elected Labour councillor for Brixton, in the London Borough of Lambeth 1998–2002, though for at least the past 15 years he has not been a member of any political party.

== Private sector ==
From 2004 to 2014, Sir Simon was a senior executive at UnitedHealth Group. Initially appointed president of UnitedHealth Europe, he became CEO of UnitedHealthcare's $30 billion Medicare business, and then corporate Executive Vice President and president of its global health businesses spanning the Americas, Europe, Asia, and Africa. He also was a director of Brazil's largest hospital group AMIL.

== Non-profits/charities ==
Stevens is a member of the Board of Directors of the Commonwealth Fund of New York and Chair of Cancer Research UK. He was instrumental in establishing an academic institute to publish information about the costs of US health care. It showed that - contrary to prior research mainly using public Medicare data - cost differences in the working age population were often because of market pricing power by hospitals, rather than because of excessive use of services by patients. He also served on the boards of the Minnesota Historical Society; the Minnesota Opera; and the Medicare Rights Center (New York), as well as the King's Fund and the Nuffield Trust.

== NHS Chief Executive ==
Stevens was appointed as Chief Executive of NHS England after a worldwide competitive search, and served under Prime Ministers David Cameron, Theresa May and Boris Johnson. According to Fraser Nelson, hiring Stevens back to run NHS England was one of the cleverest moves that David Cameron made because he "knows more about NHS problems and market solutions than any man alive". The Guardian reported one health expert as saying "He's coming back to a pay cut [and] the mother of all messes". Stevens' own assessment was that "the NHS facing its most sustained budget crunch in its history. Service pressures are intensifying, and longstanding problems are not going to disappear overnight." Stevens said his aim was to "Think like a patient, act like a taxpayer." In a speech following his appointment to the role of CEO in 2014 he set out an agenda for reform. A profile in the British Medical Journal claimed he is "intellectually gifted, charming, funny, and a great communicator. He is a natural and persuasive leader who exudes quiet confidence. He is widely read and writes superbly. He's got such a big brain he can be easily bored [but] he is a 'natural egalitarian'. Another comments, 'The new system is about distributed leadership. That will play to his strengths. He's very collegiate.' A third says, 'He's pragmatic and not ideologically driven. He'll ask how we can make this work. He's seen the rough end of the NHS - Stevens's predecessor in one post [died by] suicide'."

As the NHS England CEO, Stevens was directly accountable to Parliament for management of £150 billion of annual NHS funding. He frequently gave evidence to the Public Accounts Committee, the House of Commons Health and Social Care Committee, and other Parliamentary committees. He has used the statutory independence of NHS England to speak openly about NHS funding and reform. As of 2020, Stevens was paid a salary of between £195,000 and £199,000 by NHS England and each year he has opted for a voluntary £20,000 pay cut. During the 2019 general election campaign, while the Labour Party said they would generally not comment on public officials, they stated they had a "good relationship with Simon Stevens and respect him." In March 2019 it was announced Stevens would also lead the hospital regulator, NHS Improvement, effectively merging it into NHS England.

As NHS England Chief Executive, he has given lectures and speeches at the universities of Oxford, Cambridge, Durham, Exeter, London, Birmingham, York, Manchester, Southampton, Newcastle, and previously at Harvard, Yale, and NYU. Before taking up his NHS role, from time-to-time he authored articles in various health-related research journals. He is regularly interviewed on the BBC, ITV, Sky News, Channel 4 News and The Today Programme, as well as The Andrew Marr Show. He has also appeared on Jeremy Vine, BBC Breakfast, Any Questions? and The One Show.

=== Innovation and research ===
As CEO of NHS England Stevens oversaw within the overall £150 billion NHS budget a fund of £19 billion for medical and life sciences specialised services, innovation and R&D. He also established a ring-fenced fund within NHS England for innovative new medicines, particularly for rare conditions. He actively promoted genomics, and cell and gene therapies on the NHS. He announced that the NHS had become the first health service in Europe to negotiate approvals for newly licensed breakthrough CAR-T cancer therapies. Stevens also announced that NHS England had also successfully negotiated a confidential deal to make available a gene therapy said to be "the most expensive drug in the world" with a reported list price of £1.8 million per patient. However he publicly refused to accept the prices a US drug company initially wanted to charge the NHS for its cystic fibrosis drugs, until the company eventually agreed a confidential discounted deal for UK patients. He also accused Essential Pharma of "using the cover of coronavirus to try and price-gouge British taxpayers". The UK Competition and Markets Authority subsequently took action, calling the company's plans "particularly concerning". He has pushed the use of AI and Machine Learning in healthcare and NHS England is hosting a new £250 million NHS AI Lab. Speaking at the World Economic Forum in Davos he launched the first wave of NHS Innovation Test Beds. and introduced a new NHS innovation payment. Stevens took action to stop NHS funding of homeopathy, on the grounds that it is "at best a placebo and a misuse of scarce NHS funds." NHS England was sued by the British Homeopathic Association who argued that Stevens' criticisms, including on the BBC Radio 4 Today programme, prejudged its public consultation. The High Court dismissed the BHA challenge, and backed NHS England. He later warned patients not to believe claims that homeopathic 'duck extract' was an effective covid treatment. In a speech at Oxford University he took aim at the "dubious and dodgy" anti-science in Gwyneth Paltrow's Netflix show, The Goop Lab.

=== NHS reform ===
He was responsible for the Five Year Forward View produced by NHS England in October 2014 to achieve what Stevens labelled the "triple integration" of primary and specialist care, physical and mental health services, and NHS and social care. He has argued that government pay freezes for NHS staff, made to achieve cost savings, threatened the NHS's ability to recruit and argued that NHS wages should keep pace with the private sector. Stevens has prioritised the modernisation of mental health and cancer care He subsequently introduced shorter waiting times standards for mental health services, directed that each year local mental health spending must rise faster than overall NHS funding growth, He has however challenged the longstanding assumption that this will mean there is a need for fewer hospital beds. Given increasing concerns about young people's mental health and eating disorders, he voiced concern on the BBC's Andrew Marr Show about cosmetic surgery adverts during ITV's Love Island series. Shortly after, ITV's chief executive agreed to reconsider the ads, and the Advertising Standards Authority went on to ban them. He has suggested that social media companies might be asked to contribute to funding improved mental health support for young people. He has announced a dedicated confidential national mental health support service for NHS doctors, and 40 new mental health hubs for NHS staff affected by the COVID-19 pandemic.

Stevens is a supporter of expanded university places for the health professions such as undergraduate medicine and nursing, which could also meet the increased interest in these careers in the wake of the coronavirus pandemic. As well as supporting expanded health training opportunities for UK workers, he has backed ongoing selective international recruitment in the NHS. He led the introduction of an NHS Workforce Race Equality Standard to track and improve the experience and fair treatment of Black, Asian and Minority Ethnic Staff across the health service, and agreed to create and fund the NHS Race and Health Observatory. He proposed the creation of a 'freedom-to-speak-up index', which is now used across the NHS to track the openness with which staff concerns can be reported. He supports tougher regulation of health care managers, and has openly criticised care at a small number of maternity units, backing needed improvements with a £97 million investment package. Stevens supports a greater role for the voluntary sector and volunteering in the NHS, as a complement to the work of NHS staff.

Stevens has pushed to give local communities more control over national budgets, including stronger 'Devo Manc' regional powers for Greater Manchester. He has repeatedly argued for the importance of social care. In October 2018 he pledged up to £50 million for extra NHS support for the community affected by the Grenfell Tower fire. The Local Government Chronicle ranked him the most powerful figure in local government. His first intervention as a crossbench peer in the House of Lords was to call for amendments to the Health and Care Bill 2021 to create a funded NHS workforce plan, to bring greater transparency in private sector contracts, ensure more local decision-making on hospital services, and amendments which were successfully incorporated in the Bill which force the Health and Social Care Secretary to state each year whether mental health spending is increasing as a share of overall funding, and by how much.

=== NHS funding and Brexit ===
Stevens has argued that "One of the problems with NHS funding over the last 70 years has been its volatility. So, we bounce off the banks between boom and bust and that makes it very hard to plan services." In November 2017 Stevens gave a high profile speech making the case for a return to NHS funding increases in line with historic norms and independently assessed requirements. He did so against the backdrop of a Vote Leave poster which had promised £350 million a week for the health service and which, he said, the "public want to see honoured". His call was widely supported both inside the NHS and outside it, ranging from Brexit-supporting Jacob Rees-Mogg to the Remain-supporting general secretary of the TUC.

In June 2018 – just ahead of the NHS' 70th Anniversary – the Prime Minister Theresa May announced extra funding for the NHS worth an average real terms increase of 3.4% a year, reaching £20.5 billion extra in 2023/24. Stevens led the NHS' 70th anniversary celebrations, including giving the address on 5 July 2018 in the national service of thanksgiving at Westminster Abbey and writing jointly with the Archbishop of Canterbury wrote on the 72nd anniversary of the NHS in July 2020 On 7 January 2019 Prime Minister Theresa May and Stevens jointly launched the NHS Long Term Plan, co-authored in conjunction with patient groups and NHS clinicians. It set out how the NHS will use its extra funding to redesign care and improve outcomes over the decade ahead. In drawing up the NHS Long Term Plan, NHS England was also asked by the cross-party House of Commons Health and Social Care Committee, and by the Prime Minister, to make recommendations on possible changes to health legislation. Stevens came forward with proposals to substantially amend the government's previous 2012 legislation. The new government of Boris Johnson announced in the Queens Speech of 14 October 2019 that it would back the Long Term Plan, legislate for the £20.5 billion real terms funding increase, and introduce legislation to give effect to the NHS's recommended legal changes.

=== NHS response to COVID-19 ===
Prime Minister Boris Johnson was reported to have put Stevens personally and the NHS generally ( as against the private sector or the Department of Health and Social Care) in charge of designing and managing the national COVID-19 vaccination rollout. NHS planning began in summer 2020 for what Stevens described as "the biggest vaccination campaign in our history... and a decisive turning point". The NHS was the first health system in the world to administer the Pfizer–BioNTech vaccine, on 8 December 2020, and then the Oxford–AstraZeneca vaccine on 4 January 2021, which he described as "a major milestone in humanity's battle against coronavirus". By mid-January 2021 Stevens reported that people in England were being vaccinated four times faster than new COVID cases were occurring. By mid-February the NHS was delivering "Europe's fastest and largest COVID vaccination programme" and he said that vaccine uptake was far higher than had been envisaged, with over nine out ten people accepting the invitation. He stated that improved vaccine supply for the second phase of the NHS vaccination campaign from mid-February to April 2021 would allow the NHS to further double the speed of vaccinations. The target of offering vaccination to all adults by the end of July 2021 was delivered a month early.

Stevens also told MPs in January 2021 that COVID-19 could become a "much more treatable disease" over the next six to 18 months, raising the hope of returning to a "much more normal future". He praised NHS staff and researchers for developing new COVID therapies, which may have saved an estimated one million lives worldwide. He also allocated funding to establish the first NHS long COVID clinics. During both the spring 2020 and winter 2020–21 waves of COVID he expressed concern about the slogan "Protect the NHS", arguing that the NHS was there to protect patients, and the slogan could put people off coming forward for care. He said that "Rather than say 'Protect the NHS', health service staff prefer to say: 'Help us help you.' Keeping coronavirus under control means we avoid displacing other treatments which our nurses, doctor and therapists desperately want to sustain."

On 4 November 2020 Stevens put the NHS back on its highest level of emergency preparedness, which was maintained until 25 March 2021. During this period he appeared at a number of televised 10 Downing Street COVID press conferences alongside the Prime Minister - on 5 November, 2 December, 7 January 26 January, and 15 February 2021 (where he reported the NHS had successfully met its target of offering all high risk patients their first vaccination). By late December 2020 he stated the NHS was back in the "eye of the storm". In mid-January 2021 he told The Andrew Marr Show: "hospitals are under extreme pressure and staff are under extreme pressure...Every 30 seconds across England another patient is being admitted to hospital with coronavirus."

Responding to the proposal that NHS staff should only get a 1% pay rise after the pandemic, Stevens appeared to disagree, stating that the NHS had instead been budgeting for a higher figure, and he argued that the independent pay review bodies should be able to make their recommendations "without fear or favour". He gave the address at the national service of commemoration and thanksgiving at St Paul's Cathedral on 5 July 2021, coinciding with the award of the George Cross to the National Health Service by Her Majesty the Queen.

=== Prevention and public health ===
Stevens has drawn attention to online sources of misinformation about vaccine safety. He called on social media sites to take action against misleading and untrue health claims. Both Instagram and Facebook subsequently agreed to do so. Stevens argues that "obesity is the new smoking" and has pushed for greater NHS, family, business and government action to tackle it. He launched the obesity-reducing NHS Diabetes Prevention Programme and later backed its national expansion. He has championed NHS work to cut sugary drinks and junk food from hospitals. On climate change and on environmental health threats Stevens argues that: "The climate emergency is a health emergency, and we, the NHS, as the single biggest organisation across this country are both part of the solution and part of the problem. We are 40% of public sector emissions, and although we have reduced our carbon footprint by around a fifth over the past decade, we've got to make major changes if we're going to help this country become carbon net neutral." In 2020 Stevens appointed an expert panel to develop a route map to decarbonise the health sector, and the NHS subsequently pledged to become the world's first healthcare system to cut carbon emissions to net zero. Dr Tedros Adhanom Ghebreyesus, director general of the World Health Organization, welcomed the NHS's global leadership in doing so. Stevens has argued that the NHS – as the largest employer in Britain – is an 'anchor institution' in many local communities, and so needs to "get more creative in developing staffing and clinical models that will enable us to sustain services and consider second and third order effects in terms of jobs and economic impact and social cohesion".

== Honours and awards ==
Stevens is an Honorary Fellow of Balliol College, University of Oxford, of the Royal College of Physicians, and of the Royal College of General Practitioners. He has been awarded Honorary Doctorates by the University of Birmingham., University of Strathclyde, Glasgow and Sheffield Hallam University Stevens was knighted in the 2020 New Year Honours for services to Health and the NHS. The official citation said "Labour, Coalition and Conservative administrations have all turned to him to fundamentally shape the Health Service's strategic direction for the better."

On 29 April 2021 it was announced that Stevens would receive a life peerage. He became Lord Stevens of Birmingham, of Richmond upon Thames, on 5 July 2021. He was introduced to the House of Lords on 6 July 2021 where he sits as an independent crossbencher. He made his maiden speech in the Lords on 7 December 2021.

Lord Stevens was appointed as Honorary Captain, Royal Naval Reserve, on 1 October 2025.

Orders of precedence in the United Kingdom
Preceded by The Lord Morse	Gentlemen; Baron Stevens of Birmingham	Followed by The Lord Offord of Garvel
