= Jim Mackey (healthcare administrator) =

British health manager (born 1966)

Sir James Mackey
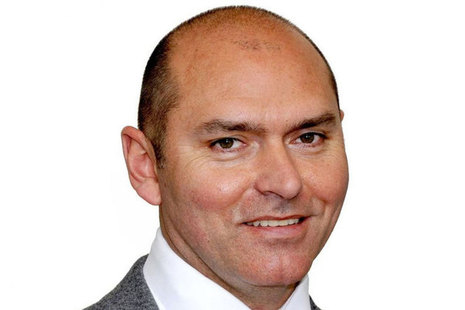

Chief Executive of NHS England
- Incumbent
- Assumed office 1 April 2025
- Preceded by: Amanda Pritchard

Chief Executive of Newcastle Hospitals
- In office 1 January 2024 – 1 April 2025
- Preceded by: Jackie Daniel
- Succeeded by: Rob Harrison

Personal details
- Born: James Mackey; October 1966 (age 59) Hebburn, South Tyneside, England
- Awards: Knight Bachelor
- Nickname: Jim

Sir James Mackey (born 11 October 1966) is a British National Health Service administrator, since April 2025 the Chief Executive of NHS England. He was previously chief executive of Northumbria Healthcare NHS Foundation Trust and Newcastle upon Tyne Hospitals NHS Foundation Trust and on a two-year secondment in 2015–2017, of NHS Improvement.

== Early life and education ==
Mackey was born in Hebburn, South Tyneside, England. He was educated at Hebburn Comprehensive School and then at New College, Durham. He is a qualified accountant.

== NHS career ==
Mackey joined the NHS in 1990. After holding finance director roles, from 2003 to 2023 he was chief executive of Northumbria Healthcare NHS Foundation Trust. He was appointed chief executive of NHS Improvement, the NHS's financial regulator, in October 2015 as a two-year secondment.

In 2021, he was in the running to succeed Simon Stevens as the chief executive of NHS England. He was ruled out early in the process, along with Dido Harding; from the shortlist of candidates, Amanda Pritchard was appointed to the position. He was appointed in September 2021 to lead NHS England's effort to reduce the backlog in elective services following the COVID-19 pandemic.

In January 2024, Mackey took over as CEO of the Newcastle upon Tyne Hospitals NHS Foundation Trust.

In February 2025 it was announced that Mackey would become the interim CEO of NHS England on 1 April, following Pritchard's resignation. With the title of "transition chief executive", his expected period of office is one or two years, after which he is to return to Newcastle upon Tyne. He began his term by ordering significant cuts to avert deficits.

=== Recognition ===
Mackey was rated by the Health Service Journal to be the seventh most influential person in the English NHS in 2015, the third in 2016, and the fifth in 2022.

== Honours ==
He was knighted in the 2019 New Year Honours.

== Personal life ==
Mackey and his wife, Vicky, have two children.
