= Alan Langlands =

English university principal (born 1952)

Professor Sir Alan Langlands FRSE FFPH FCGI FIA

Chief Executive of NHS England
- In office 1994 – 31 August 2000
- Preceded by: Duncan Nichol
- Succeeded by: Nigel Crisp

Personal details
- Born: 29 May 1952 (age 74) Glasgow, Scotland

Sir Robert Alan Langlands (born 29 May 1952) is a former vice-chancellor of the University of Leeds. He is notable for past service as the fourth chief executive of the National Health Service executive in England (1994–2000), as principal and vice-chancellor of the University of Dundee (2000–2009), and Chief Executive of the Higher Education Funding Council for England (2009–2013).

== Early career ==
Born in Glasgow, he attended Allan Glen's School in Glasgow and graduated with an ordinary degree in biological science from the University of Glasgow in 1974.

He became General Manager of North West Thames Regional Health Authority in 1991. Between 1994 and 2000 he served as the chief executive of the NHS executive in England where he was the Secretary of State’s principal policy adviser for the NHS. He was known as a formidably hard worker. In 1998 he received a Knighthood in the Queen's Birthday Honours for his services to the NHS.

Langlands was chief executive of the NHS in England during a period of rapid change. His six years at the top, from 1994 to 2000, spanned the election of the new Labour government and included the Bristol inquiry, the rise of concern about healthcare-acquired infections and pressure for changes in working practices in the NHS. He also oversaw the setting up of bodies such as the National Institute for Health and Clinical Excellence and the Commission for Health Improvement, which drove improvement and consistency across the NHS.

== University of Dundee ==
In September 2000, Sir Alan took up the post Principal and Vice-Chancellor of the University of Dundee following the retirement of Ian James Graham-Bryce. During this time, Sir Alan was also appointed Chairman of UK Biobank, a joint venture set up by the Wellcome Trust and the Medical Research Council to oversee one of the world's largest genetic epidemiology studies, and a Non-Executive Director of the Office for the Strategic Coordination of Health Research and the UK Statistics Authority. He is a Trustee of The Nuffield Trust and Chairman-designate of the Health Foundation.

In November 2008, Sir Alan announced his intention to stand down from his position as Principal at the University of Dundee in March 2009.

In June 2010, the university awarded Sir Alan an honorary degree, Doctor of Laws (LLD).

== The Higher Education Funding Council for England (HEFCE) ==
On 1 April 2009, Alan Langlands became Chief Executive of the Higher Education Funding Council for England, replacing Professor David Eastwood.

== University of Leeds ==
On 25 March 2013, it was announced that Sir Alan had been appointed as the Vice-Chancellor of the University of Leeds replacing Professor Michael Arthur. Sir Alan took up his appointment on 1 October 2013 and stepped down from this role on 31 August 2020.

== Honours ==
In October 2001 Langlands was conferred a doctor of the University of Glasgow and in April 2001 he was awarded an honorary fellowship of the Royal College of General Practitioners for his contribution to the general medical field for his work with the NHS. He is an honorary professor at the University of Warwick business school and the US Advisory Board of the Johns Hopkins University Bioethics Institute. He has also received honorary fellowships by the Royal College of Physicians (London), the Royal College of General Practitioners, the Royal College of Surgeons of Edinburgh, the Royal College of Physicians and Surgeons (Glasgow), the Faculty of Public Health Medicine and the Institute of Actuaries. He holds a diploma of the Institute of Healthcare Management.

He also holds membership of the Health Advisory Board at INSEAD, the External Advisory Board of the Royal College of Physicians and the National Advisory Board of the Johns Hopkins University Bioethics Institute.

He has also been awarded the HM Queen Elizabeth, The Queen Mother Fellowship by the Nuffield Trust.

Academic offices
| Preceded by Ian James Graham-Bryce | Principal and Vice-Chancellor of the University of Dundee; 2000–2009 | Succeeded by Peter Downes |
| Preceded by Michael Arthur | Vice-Chancellor of the University of Leeds; 2013–2020 | Succeeded by Simone Buitendijk |
