= NHS Long Term Plan =

2019 plan on healthcare by NHS England

The NHS Long Term Plan, also known as the NHS 10-Year Plan, is a document published by NHS England on 7 January 2019, which sets out its priorities for healthcare over the next 10 years and shows how the NHS funding settlement will be used. It was published by NHS England chief executive Simon Stevens and Prime Minister Theresa May.

The plan marked the official abandonment of the policy of competition in the English NHS, which was established by the Health and Social Care Act 2012. Integrated care systems are to be created across England by 2021, Clinical Commissioning Groups are to be merged and NHS England with NHS Improvement appear to be merging, unofficially, though this is all to happen without actually repealing the legislation.

== The plan ==
The plan proposes to shift resources out of hospitals into community services and primary care and in particular to improve mental health support in schools and 24-hour access to mental health crisis teams. The NHS budget is to increase by £20 billion a year by 2023. This is the equivalent of annual rises of just under 3.5%, but this has been widely criticized as below the historic trend of health funding, which in most developed countries has been rising at about 4% a year. The plan is also criticised for its failure to address very significant shortages of clinicians.

The main disease priorities are cancer, cardiovascular disease, stroke, diabetes, respiratory disease and mental health and some quite detailed targets. There is a specific emphasis on digital access which will be used to redesign services to avoid up to a third of hospital outpatient visits. The particular focus on children's health includes halving the number of stillbirths, maternal mortality and neonatal deaths and serious brain injuries at birth by 2025.

There is a considerable stress on preventative work, with claims that this could save up to 500,000 lives a year. Hospitals will run the Diabetes Prevention Programme, smoking cessation programmes and Alcohol Care Teams in the hospitals with the highest rate of alcohol dependence-related admissions. More patients with severe mental health problems will receive physical health checks each year. This has been criticised as secondary prevention, while public health and primary prevention which were transferred to local authorities by the 2012 legislation have suffered reductions in funding.

The plan says "“Action by the NHS is a complement to, but cannot be a substitute for, the important role for local government… in recent years it has also become responsible for funding and commissioning preventive health services, including smoking cessation, drug and alcohol services, sexual health, and early years support for children such as school nursing and health visitors."

The plan includes the proposed repeal of the specific procurement requirements in the Health and Social Care and the NHS (Procurement, Patient Choice and Competition) (No.2) Regulations 2013. This would allow NHS commissioners to decide the circumstances in which they should use procurement procedures, subject to statutory guidance and a best value test to secure the best outcomes for patients and the taxpayer.

=== NHS Assembly ===
56 people were recruited in early 2019 to form a forum which is to advise on the implementation of the plan. The assembly is to be chaired by Dr Clare Gerada and Professor Sir Chris Ham and will meet four times a year. It has a very varied membership including people from the voluntary sector, Rachel Power, the Chief Executive of the Patients Association, Charlotte Pickles, who previously advised Iain Duncan Smith, Polly Toynbee, and the president of the Royal College of Nursing Anne Marie Rafferty.

== Response ==
The Royal College of Midwives were encouraged to see that maternity care was a key point. They welcomed promises to build on the Maternity Transformation Programme (MTP) and the key pledges around continuity of care for most women by March 2021 and halving the rates of stillbirth and neonatal and maternal deaths by 2025. However, they questioned the lack of clarity on how these changes intend to be implemented and on workforce planning.

The Financial Times commented that "Nothing much will change until the NHS begins to fill an estimated 100,000 vacancies" and urged ministers to "take on those interest groups lobbying against the changes needed to promote healthier lifestyles."

== History and background ==
In the summer of 2018, the government asked the NHS to come up with a 10-year plan for how an increase in funding over the following five years should be used. This budget settlement for the NHS was announced by the Prime Minister that summer as being £20.5 billion. In addition, at this time, Simon Stevens disclosed the five major priorities for the 10 year NHS plan.

Following the introduction of competition into the NHS in the 1990s, a number of NHS plans, with varying goals, effects and achievements have included;

- "The NHS Plan 2000", which encouraged outsourcing and public-private partnerships It promised an increase in staff, hospital beds and equipment and modernised premises. In addition, it proposed to reduce waiting lists and bring in new targets and standards.
- "The NHS improvement plan 2004", which also aimed to reduce waiting times for treatment and increase patient choice. It also listed disease prevention, inequalities and chronic conditions as priorities.
- "Our health, our care, our say 2006", that emphasised a move from hospital care to the community, with an accompanying shift in funding.
- "High quality care for all 2008", which focused on improving quality of care and patient safety.
- "Healthy lives, healthy people 2010", which projected a long-term view for public health in England, encouraging prevention measures.
- "Equity and excellence: liberating the NHS 2010", which extended the role of competition.
- "The Health and Social Care Act 2012" doubled private sector outsourcing and allowed foundation trust hospitals to make up to half their income from private patients.
- "The NHS five year forward view 2014", which lobbied for further disease prevention and tackling inequalities. It also established the foundations of the long-term NHS plan.

== See also ==
- NHS Plan 2000
- Five Year Forward View
