= Sarah-Jane Marsh =

British healthcare executive

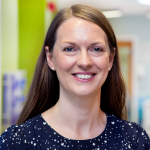
Sarah-Jane Marsh.

Sarah-Jane Marsh CBE is a British healthcare official. She is the deputy chief operating officer and national director of urgent and emergency care for NHS England.

== Background ==
Marsh was born in Dudley. She grew up in the Black Country. Marsh attended the University of Lancaster as an undergraduate. She also studied a Master of Arts (postgraduate) in Russian and East European Studies, which was awarded to her in 2000, and a Master of Science in Health Care Management, which was awarded to her in 2005; both degrees were studied at the University of Birmingham, with her Master of Science in Health Care Management being a part of her completion of the NHS Graduate Management Scheme. She was later given an honorary degree by the University of Birmingham. In 2018, Marsh was awarded an honorary doctorate by Birmingham City University.

== Career ==
When Marsh left the University of Lancaster where she studied for an undergraduate degree, she embarked on training to be a member of MI5, the domestic state intelligence service of the UK. However, she told the Birmingham Mail in a 2014 interview that after her father became unwell in 1999, she began to value the work of NHS staff in caring for him, and began to become more interested in healthcare.

Marsh was first employed by the NHS in 2000. She worked in Walsall Hospital NHS Trust from 2002 until 2007.

She became the chief operating officer of Birmingham Children's Hospital in December 2007 and then the chief executive of the hospital in March 2009. In October 2009, it was reported that she was earning approximately £155,000 for this role. In 2015, she also became the chief executive of Birmingham Women's Hospital. The two hospitals' trusts were then merged by Marsh.

In 2016, she became the head of a new board to transform maternity services in the NHS in England; she remained the chief executive of Birmingham Children's Hospital NHS Trust and Birmingham Women's Hospital NHS Trust after starting this role.

In the early half of 2020 she began leading the "test" part of the UK "test and trace" programme, which was part of the UK response to the COVID-19 pandemic.

In 2022, she was chairing the "discharge taskforce" of the Department of Health and Social Care. In late 2022 she became the new director of emergency care and urgent care at NHS England and a deputy chief operating officer at NHS England.

== Personal life ==
In 2009, Marsh married David Nicholson, who was then the chief executive of NHS England. Prior to this, Marsh had at one point been a director's assistant to Nicholson.

She has two children called Rosa and Ronnie .

She was awarded a CBE in 2022.
