= Nicholson challenge =

The term "Nicholson challenge" refers to a set of mandates that the former (2006-2012) leader of the National Health Service in England, Sir David Nicholson, has put forth to the entirety of the NHS in a drive to find "efficiency savings" amidst a UK economy in upheaval.

The parameters of the "challenge" by Nicholson to the NHS collectively add up to a demand by Nicholson for the NHS to find £20 billion in "efficiency savings" by 2015. The claim is that better ways of working rather than more spending must be found, amidst a warning that if the challenge were not met, either more money would be needed or fewer desirable results would be achieved.

The Health and Social Care Bill 2011's provisions, which greatly alter the fundamentals of NHS functioning (not just financing), is technically not a part of this "challenge" at all, but is happening separately. The Nicholson challenge keeps NHS law and regulations as they have been prior to the Health And Social Care Bill's passage, but asks staff and administrators to find these "savings" within those present parameters nevertheless.

== Problems ==
The NHS faces unprecedented financial pressures, and there are growing worries that patient care will suffer. For social care, it will be increasingly difficult for councils to make further savings without directly cutting services or affecting quality. Health and care services have coped well until now, but it is clear that many organisations expect things to become much more difficult over the coming year [2013]. (John Appleby of the King's Fund)

Doctors and nurses across the NHS already complained early in 2011 that front-line NHS services of many different types were having to be cut immediately, and very heavily, in order to achieve these "savings", despite Nicholson alleging that they would not have to be. NHS workers still insist, up to the present day, that it is impossible to find these types of 'savings' in this amount of time without having to make drastic cutbacks to existing services. Even a late-March 2012 news article dealing with the risk register of the Health and Social Care Bill 2011 found fit to mention a few lines about the Nicholson Challenge's £20bn target, mentioning that in the 2010-dated risk register, "Civil servants ... rate highly the danger that the £20bn savings may not materialise as managers lose focus and ... quality of patient care suffers", even though "Ministers [today in 2012 say] that a report to be published on Tuesday shows that the NHS is on course to meet the so called "Nicholson challenge" to save £20bn over the course of this parliament."

On 18 October 2011, the allegations by doctors and nurses of a direct and immediate decline in care as a result of the Nicholson Challenge was backed up by research when The Guardian published an exposé revealing how the Nicholson Challenge is "really affecting the young, old and infirm".

The BBC released a 3 February 2012 article stating that twelve London hospital trusts were already "not financially viable" to withstand the pressures of current cost-saving measures plus the ultimate goals cited by the Nicholson Challenge. The article reports that those with knowledge of these trusts' financial performance allege that to remain viable the local total collection of 18 area hospital trusts alone would have to make a total of £1.2bn in efficiency savings by 2015 including £421m in nursing cuts.

On 10 February 2012, The Independent reported that the NHS spent £195 million on redundancy payments in 2010/11 and expected to spend £616.6 million on these payments in 2011/12. It is estimated that between 9,100 and 16,800 staff will be made redundant; apparently, these costs are accounted for in the £20 billion savings target of the Nicholson Challenge.

On 4 July 2012, The Guardian reported that the Institute for Fiscal Studies has been saying that the NHS will need to find "an extra £20bn a year by 2020" — a figure the IFS itself essentially admits is ironic given that the Nicholson Challenge's £20bn in 'savings' is meant to be completed by 5 years prior to that point, in 2015. The article states that the IFS reports that "England's NHS budget squeeze [from the Nicholson Challenge] is already the "tightest four-year period for the last 50 years". NHS spending will be essentially flat in real terms - at about £110bn a year - until 2015." Because of these shifts and the long-term financial hardship the IFS is saying these circumstances will cause, the IFS suggests in its report that from 2015 through 2020 a solution the NHS might have to consider could include "...a mixture of charging, tax rises and perhaps even greater borrowing". If what the IFS alleges becomes actual government policy, then it will be thereafter be unclear how either the government or the NHS would be able to reconcile the instituting of monetary charges from patients with the first fundamental NHS pillar, in place since its founding in 1948, which insists unequivocally that the NHS must be, and must remain, "free at the point of use".

== Defending the challenge ==
Defenders of the "challenge", such as James Ball of The Daily Telegraph, point out that health service finance directors had already been fully aware, since the summer of 2009, of the kind of constraints that would have to be dealt with because of the UK deficit crisis. Nicholson first signalled his challenge in June 2009 while the UK government was under the previous administration, that of Gordon Brown and the policy received the full support of the then Secretary of State Andy Burnham.

In September 2012 the Guardian revealed a commercial sector report which, with significant irony, estimated that private companies can expect to benefit from £20 billion worth of income from the privatisation of health services resulting from the Health and Social Care Act 2012

== See also ==
- NHS Sustainability and transformation plans in England
