= Health and Social Care Act 2012 =

Act of the Parliament of the United Kingdom

Health and Social Care Act 2012 (Note: Section 309.)
- Act of Parliament
- Parliament of the United Kingdom
- Long title: An Act to establish and make provision about a National Health Service Commissioning Board and clinical commissioning groups and to make other provision about the National Health Service in England; to make provision about public health in the United Kingdom; to make provision about regulating health and adult social care services; to make provision about public involvement in health and social care matters, scrutiny of health matters by local authorities and cooperation between local authorities and commissioners of health care services; to make provision about regulating health and social care workers; to establish and make provision about a National Institute for Health and Care Excellence; to establish and make provision about a Health and Social Care Information Centre and to make other provision about information relating to health or social care matters; to abolish certain public bodies involved in health or social care; to make other provision about health care; and for connected purposes.
- Citation: 2012 c. 7
- Introduced by: Andrew Lansley; Secretary of State for Health (Commons)
- Territorial extent: Section 46, 56 (1) and (3), 57, 58, 60, 150 (2) and paragraph 1 of Schedule 13, Section 214 (1) Section 222 (1), Sections 230(1) - (4), and (6) and paragraph 53 and 59 of Schedule 15, Part 7, Section 231 (1), (3) And Part 2 of Schedule 20, Section 300, 301, Part 12, extend to England, Wales, Scotland and Northern Ireland, Sections 128-133 extend to England and Wales and Scotland only (Note: Section 308.)

Dates
- Royal assent: 27 March 2012
- Commencement: Various (Note: Section 306.)
Other legislation
| Amends | Abortion Act 1967; Employers' Liability (Compulsory Insurance) Act 1969; House of Commons Disqualification Act 1975; Public Health (Control of Disease) Act 1984; Dentists Act 1984; Opticians Act 1989; Water Industry Act 1991; Social Security Contributions and Benefits Act 1992; Health Service Commissioners Act 1993; Value Added Tax Act 1994; Criminal Procedure (Scotland) Act 1995; Education Act 1996; Care Standards Act 2000; Scottish Public Services Ombudsman Act 2002; Domestic Violence, Crime and Victims Act 2004; Mental Capacity Act 2005; National Health Service Act 2006; National Health Service (Wales) Act 2006; National Health Service (Consequential Provisions) Act 2006; Safeguarding Vulnerable Groups Act 2006; Mental Health Act 2007; Criminal Justice and Immigration Act 2008; Charities Act 2011 |
| Amended by | Sentencing Act 2020; Digital Markets, Competition and Consumers Act 2024; Rare Cancers Act 2026 |

Status: Amended

History of passage through Parliament

Text of statute as originally enacted

Revised text of statute as amended

The Health and Social Care Act 2012 (c. 7) is an act of the Parliament of the United Kingdom. It provided for the most extensive reorganisation of the structure of the National Health Service in England to date. It removed responsibility for the health of citizens from the Secretary of State for Health, which the post had carried since the inception of the NHS in 1948. It abolished primary care trusts (PCTs) and strategic health authorities (SHAs) and transferred between £60 billion and £80 billion of "commissioning", or healthcare funds, from the abolished PCTs to several hundred clinical commissioning groups, partly run by the general practitioners (GPs) in England. A new executive agency of the Department of Health, Public Health England, was established under the act on 1 April 2013.

The proposals were primarily the result of policies of the then Secretary of State for Health, Andrew Lansley. Writing in The BMJ, Clive Peedell (co-chairman of the NHS Consultants Association and a consultant clinical oncologist) compared the policies with academic analyses of privatisation and found "evidence that privatisation is an inevitable consequence of many of the policies contained in the Health and Social Care Bill". Lansley said that claims that the government was attempting to privatise the NHS were "ludicrous scaremongering".

The proposals contained in the act were some of the coalition government's most controversial. Although mentioned in the Conservative Party's manifesto in 2010, they were not contained in the Conservative–Liberal Democrat coalition agreement, which mentioned the NHS only to commit the coalition to a real-term funding increase every year. Within two months of the election a white paper was published, outlining what The Daily Telegraph called the "biggest revolution in the NHS since its foundation". The bill was introduced in the House of Commons on 19 January 2011. In April 2011 the government announced a "listening exercise", halting the bill's legislative progress until after the May local elections; the "listening exercise" finished by the end of that month. The bill received royal assent on 27 March 2012. Many of the structures established by this act of Parliament were dismantled by the Health and Care Act 2022.

== Background ==
The proposals in the act were not discussed during the 2010 general election campaign and were not contained in the Conservative–Liberal Democrat coalition agreement of 20 May 2010, which declared an intention to "stop the top-down reorganisations of the NHS that have got in the way of patient care". However, within two months a white paper outlined what The Daily Telegraph called the "biggest revolution in the NHS since its foundation". The white paper, Equity and Excellence: Liberating the NHS, was followed in December 2010 by an implementation plan in the form of Liberating the NHS: legislative framework and next steps. McKinsey & Company who have been influential in the British Department of Health for many years was heavily involved in the discussions around the bill. The bill was introduced into the House of Commons on 19 January 2011 and received its second reading, a vote to approve the general principles of the bill, by 321–235, a majority of 86, on 31 January 2011.

=== White Paper ===
The act had implications for the entire English NHS. Primary care trusts (PCTs) and strategic health authorities (SHAs) would be abolished, with projected redundancy costs of £1 billion for around 21,000 staff. £60 to £80 billion worth of commissioning would be transferred from PCTs to several hundred clinical commissioning groups, partly run by GPs. Around 3,600 facilities owned by PCTs and SHAs would transfer to NHS Property Services, a limited company owned by the Department of Health.

When the white paper was presented to Parliament, the Secretary of State for Health, Andrew Lansley, stated three key principles:

- patients at the centre of the NHS
- changing the emphasis of measurement to clinical outcomes
- empowering health professionals, in particular GPs.

The white paper set out a timetable. By April 2012, it proposed to:

- establish the independent NHS Commissioning Board
- establish new local authority Health and wellbeing boards
- develop Monitor as an economic regulator.

The bill foresaw all NHS trusts becoming, or being amalgamated into, foundation trusts. The bill also abolished the existing cap on trusts' income from non-NHS sources, which in most cases was previously set at a relatively low single-digit percentage.

Under the bill's provisions the new commissioning system was expected to be in place by April 2013, at which time SHAs and PCTs would be abolished.

The bill was analysed by Stephen Cragg of Doughty Street Chambers, on behalf of the 38 Degrees campaign, who concluded that "Effectively, the duty to provide a national health service would be lost if the Bill becomes law, and would be replaced by a duty on an unknown number of commissioning consortia with only a duty to make or arrange provision for that section of the population for which it is responsible." It replaces a "duty to provide" with a "duty to promote".

=== "Listening exercise" ===
After an increase in opposition pressure, including from both rank-and-file Liberal Democrats and the British Medical Association, the government announced a "listening exercise" with critics. On 4 April 2011 the government announced a "pause" in the progress of the bill to allow the government to 'listen, reflect and improve' the proposals.

The Prime Minister, David Cameron, said "the status quo is not an option" and many within his and Nick Clegg's coalition said that certain aspects of the bill, such as the formation of Clinical commissioning groups, were not only not open for discussion, but also already too far along the path to completion to be stopped. Cameron insisted that the act was part of his "Big Society" agenda and that it would not alter the fundamental principles of the NHS.

Part of the "listening exercise" saw the creation on 6 April 2011 of the "NHS Future Forum". The forum, according to Private Eye, "brings together 43 hand-picked individuals, many of whom are known as supporters of Lansley's approach". At the same time, David Cameron set up a separate panel to advise him on the reforms; members of this panel include Lord Crisp (NHS chief executive 2000–2006), Bill Moyes (a former head of Monitor), and the head of global health systems at McKinsey, as well as Mark Britnell, the head of health policy at KPMG. Six months previously Britnell had told a conference of private healthcare executives that "In future, the NHS will be a state insurance provider not a state deliverer", and emphasised the role of Lansley's reforms in making this possible: "The NHS will be shown no mercy and the best time to take advantage of this will be in the next couple of years." KPMG issued a press statement on behalf of Britnell on 16 May 2011 stating

"The article in The Observer attributes quotes to me that do not properly reflect discussions held at a private conference last October. Nor was I given the opportunity to respond ahead of publication. I worked in the NHS for twenty years and now work alongside it. I have always been a passionate advocate of the NHS and believe that it has a great future. Like many other countries throughout the world, the pressure facing healthcare funding and provision are enormous. If the NHS is to change and modernise the public, private and voluntary sectors will all need to play their part."

In June 2011 Cameron announced that the original deadline of 2013 would no longer be part of the reforms. There would also be changes to the bill to make clear that the main duty of the health regulator, Monitor, was to promote the interests of patients rather than promoting competition.

The Future Forum report suggested that any organisation that treats NHS patients, including independent hospitals, should be forced to hold meetings in public and publish minutes. It also wanted the establishment of a Citizens' Panel to report on how easy it is to choose services, while patients would be given a right to challenge poor treatment. The original bill sought to abolish two tiers of management and hand power to new bodies led by GPs, called commissioning consortia, to buy £60 billion a year in treatment. Professor Steve Field, a GP who chaired the forum, said many of the fears the public and medical profession had about the Health and Social Care Bill had been "justified" as it contained "insufficient safeguards" against private companies exploiting the NHS.

=== Amendments ===
Following the completion of the listening exercise, the bill was recommitted to a public bill committee on 21 June 2011. On 7 September, the bill passed the House of Commons and received its third reading by 316–251. On 12 October 2011, the bill was approved in principle at second reading in the House of Lords by 354–220. An amendment moved by Lord Owen to commit the most controversial clauses of the bill to a select committee was defeated by 330–262. The bill was subsequently committed to a committee of the whole House for detailed scrutiny. The committee stage was completed on 21 December 2011, and the bill was passed by the Lords, with amendments, on 19 March 2012. The Commons agreed to all Lords amendments to the bill on 20 March 2012. The bill received Royal Assent and became the Health and Social Care Act 2012 on 27 March 2012.

== Contents ==
=== Parts 1 and 2 Health service in England ===
Section 4 introduced, for the first time, a duty of the Secretary of State for Health to reduce health inequalities in access to and outcomes of healthcare among the people of England.

Section 9 establishes the National Health Service Commissioning Board, later known as NHS England. The Secretary of State is to publish, annually, a document known as the mandate which specifies the objectives which the Board should seek to achieve. National Health Service (Mandate Requirements) Regulations are published each year to give legal force to the mandate.

Section 10 establishes Clinical Commissioning Groups which are to arrange the provision of health services in each local area.

Section 11 makes the protection of public health a duty of the Secretary of State, and section 12 makes local authorities responsible for improving the health of the people in their areas. Among the effects of this, local authorities regained the commissioning of some community services such as those for sexual health and substance misuse.

Section 30 requires each local authority to appoint a director of public health, and gives the Secretary of State certain powers over that person's appointment.

=== Part 5 Public involvement and local government ===
Sections 181 to 189 establish Healthwatch England, responsible for gathering and championing the views of users of health and social care services in order to identify improvements and influence providers' plans.

Sections 194 to 199 establish Health and wellbeing boards in each upper-tier local authority, in order to encourage providers of health and social care to work in an integrated manner.

=== Part 8, National Institute for Health and Care Excellence ===
Sections 232 to 249 expand the role of the National Institute for Health and Clinical Excellence to include social care, re-establishing the body on 1 April 2013 as the National Institute for Health and Care Excellence (known as NICE). This non-departmental public body publishes guidance in areas such as the use of new and existing medicines, treatments and procedures, taking into account cost-effectiveness; its scope is NHS services, public health services, and (in England only) social care.

=== Part 10, Abolition of public bodies ===
Sections 278 to 283 abolished the Alcohol Education and Research Council, the Appointments Commission, the National Information Governance Board for Health and Social Care, the National Patient Safety Agency, the NHS Institute for Innovation and Improvement and the standing advisory committees.

=== Parts 11 and 12, Miscellaneous ===
Sections 284 to 309 contained various other provisions.

== Public reactions ==
=== General ===
On 19 January 2012 two major unions of healthcare professionals that had previously tried to work with the government on the bill, the Royal College of Nursing and the Royal College of Midwives, decided instead to join with the British Medical Association in "outright opposition" to the bill. On 3 February 2012 the Royal College of General Practitioners also called on the Prime Minister to withdraw the bill.

The Confederation of British Industry supported the bill, declaring that "Allowing the best provider to deliver healthcare services, whether they are a private company or a charity, will spur innovation and choice."

In May 2011, a number of doctors from GP consortia wrote a letter to The Daily Telegraph in which they expressed their support for the bill, calling its plans "a natural conclusion of the GP commissioning role that began with fundholding in the 1990s and, more recently, of the previous government's agenda of GP polysystems and practice-based commissioning". On 14 May 2011, The Guardian published an article reporting that the GP appointed to head the NHS "listening exercise" has unilaterally condemned the bill. The article said that Steve Field had "dismissed" the plans "as unworkable" and that these statements were "provisional conclusions that could fatally undermine the plans". The Royal College of General Practitioners (RCGP) also denounced the bill.

The Royal College of Physicians and Royal College of Surgeons welcomed in principle the idea of medical professionals determining the direction of NHS services, but questioned the Bill's implementation of the principle, particularly in regard to the approach of making GP consortia the primary commissioning deciders, and also in regard to requiring competition. The British Medical Association said similarly. Neither of these organisations supported the bill.

In February 2011 David Bennett, newly appointed Chair of Monitor, said the NHS could become like other privatised utilities, so that Monitor would potentially be a regulator like Ofcom, Ofgem and Ofwat: "We, in the UK, have done this in other sectors before. We did it in gas, we did it in power, we did it in telecoms […] We've done it in rail, we've done it in water, so there's actually 20 years of experience in taking monopolistic, monolithic markets and providers and exposing them to economic regulation." The House of Commons Select Committee on Health condemned the comparison as not "accurate or helpful."

=== GPs as commissioners ===
The bill intended to make general practitioners the direct overseers of NHS funds, rather than having those funds channelled through neighbourhood- and region-based primary care trusts, as was previously done.

There were concerns about fragmentation of the NHS and a loss of coordination and planning. The Royal College of General Practitioners said it was "concerned that some of the types of choice outlined in the government's proposals run a risk of destabilising the NHS and causing long-term harm to patient outcomes, particularly in cases of children with disabilities, those with multiple comorbidities and the frail and elderly." The Royal College of Physicians said that "Whilst we welcome the broad provision in the bill to seek professional expertise, the RCP is concerned that the bill does not require that specialists are at the heart of the commissioning process." The Royal College of Psychiatrists said it "would be dismayed if psychiatrists were not closely involved with local consortia of GPs in the development of mental health services." The Royal College of Surgeons said that "the legislation leaves the question of regional level commissioning unanswered with no intermediary structure put in place." And there were concerns about management expertise, particularly by looking at the US. The BMJ wrote that:

"No matter how many GP consortiums eventually emerge, their number will probably greatly exceed the 152 primary care trusts they are replacing, which brings a set of new challenges. Smaller populations increase the chances that a few very expensive patients will blow a hole in budgets. More consortiums mean that commissioning skills, already in short supply nationally, will be spread even more thinly. Denied economies of scale, smaller consortiums may be tempted to cut corners on high quality infrastructure and management, thereby endangering their survival. These points emerge clearly from an examination of 20 years of US experience of handing the equivalent of commissioning budgets to groups of doctors. Some groups had severely underestimated the importance of high quality professional management support in their early days and gone bankrupt as a result."

The House of Commons health committee has suggested the government let experts other than the consortia GPs and their direct allies get involved in the running of the consortia, including hospital doctors, public health chiefs, social care staff, and councillors. That idea received some wider support and the government agreed to give it consideration. Those close to Health Secretary Andrew Lansley have said that he is concerned adding too many people to consortia decision-making risks making them too unwieldy." In 2010 the same committee had gone so far as to declare that "if reliable figures for the costs of commissioning prove that it is uneconomic and if it does not begin to improve soon, after 20 years of costly failure, the purchaser/provider split may need to be abolished."

=== Accountability ===
Kieran Walshe, professor of health policy and management and Chris Ham, chief executive of the King's Fund, argued that "At a national level, it is difficult to see who, if anyone, will be in charge of the NHS. There will be five key national bodies: the Department of Health, the National Institute for Health and Clinical Excellence, the Care Quality Commission, the NHS Commissioning Board, and the economic regulator Monitor. Although the remit of each is set out in legislation, it is not clear how these national bodies will interact or how they will provide coordinated and consistent governance of the NHS."

Clinical commissioning groups operate as statutory bodies, though it was suggested that up to third of CCGs are reluctant to do so.

=== Pace and timing of change ===
The King's Fund said that "the very real risk that the speed and scale of the reforms could destabilise the NHS and undermine care must be actively managed."

The BMJ said in January 2011 that "The bill promises that all general practices will be part of consortiums by April 2012, yet it took six years for 56% of general practices to become fundholders after the introduction of the internal market. Nearly seven years after the first NHS trust was granted foundation status, there are still more than half to go—within two years. And there's more. The replacement for the 10 strategic health authorities—the NHS Commissioning Board—needs to be fully operational by next April. By then, GP consortiums should have developed relationships with local authorities, which will assume ultimate responsibility for public health via their new health and wellbeing boards, working alongside Public Health England, a completely new entity." The BMA believes such targets to be either wholly impossible or, at best, able to be done only in a very roughshod manner, which could in turn have very serious on-the-ground consequences to NHS functioning.

=== Medical establishment reaction ===
The British Medical Association opposed the bill, and held its first emergency meeting in 19 years, which asked the government to withdraw the bill and reconsider the reforms, although a motion of no confidence in Andrew Lansley by the BMA failed. A later motion of no confidence in Lansley at the Royal College of Nursing Conference in 2011 succeeded, with 96% voting in favour of the motion, and several speeches thereafter condemning Lansley threefold: the Health and Social Care Bill 2011 as written; Lansley's decision not to address the entire Conference with a speech, but instead to hold a separate meeting with 40 Conference attendees in a separate space (taken as an insult to nurses, and leading to accusations of 'gutlessness'); and the current separate "efficiency savings" measures being undertaken across the NHS and those actions' material impact on frontline medical services, especially as contrasted with several prominent officials, including NHS leaders and Lansley himself, repeatedly assuring that NHS frontline services are 'protected' at all times regardless of these "savings" measures. "People will die", Richard Horton, editor of The Lancet, warned in March 2012, as he predicted "unprecedented chaos" as a result of the reforms, with a leaked draft risk-assessment claiming that emergencies could be less well managed and the increased use of the private sector could drive up costs.

=== Opposition groups ===
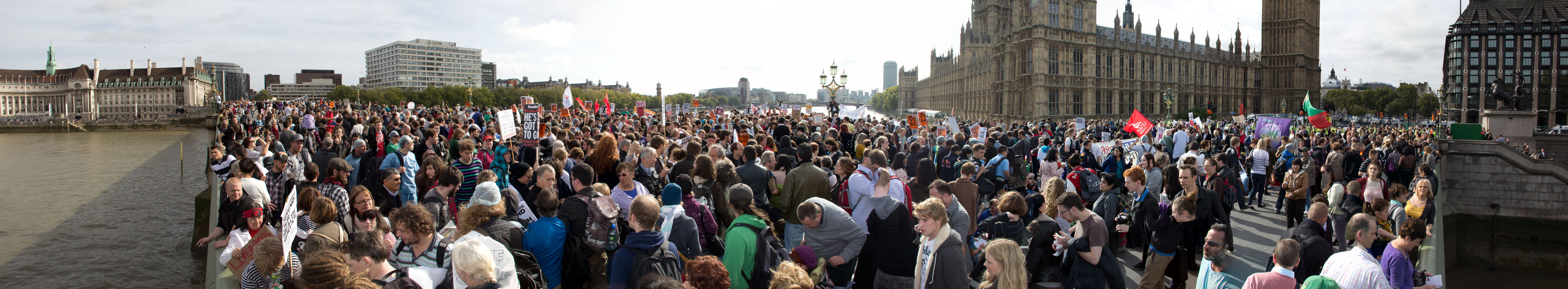
A panorama of the 'Block the Bridge' anti-cuts protest on Westminster Bridge, in October 2011

Various pressure groups opposed the bill, including The People's Assembly, NHS Direct Action, Keep Our NHS Public, 38 Degrees, the Socialist Health Association, many Trades unions, including the Chartered Society of Physiotherapy, UNISON, and Unite. 38 Degrees' petition against the reforms passed 250,000 signatures by 21 April 2011. In March 2011 a motion at the Liberal Democrat spring conference called for changes to the Bill to ensure greater accountability and prevent cherry-picking by private providers, among other demands aimed at reducing marketisation of the NHS. UNISON sponsored rapper NxtGen to create an unflattering hip hop track about the bill, which as of June 2011 had been viewed over 390,000 times on YouTube.

Jeremy Hunt was appointed Health Secretary in a cabinet reshuffle on 4 September 2012, succeeding Lansley. He had previously co-authored a book calling for the NHS to be dismantled and replaced with a system of personal health accounts. The deputy chairman of the British Medical Association, Kailash Chand, said "Jeremy Hunt is new Health Secretary – disaster in the NHS carries on. I fear a more toxic right winger to follow the privatisation agenda."

On 9 October 2011, a protest organised by UK Uncut took place on Westminster Bridge. an estimated 2,000 health workers and activists attended the protest.

On 5 March 2012, the campaign group 38 Degrees erected 130 billboards in the centre of London with the aim of persuading David Cameron to abandon the bill.

On 25 September 2013 Labour's shadow health secretary Andy Burnham promised that the party would repeal the Health and Social Care Act in "the first Queen's Speech" if elected.

== Effects of the act ==
In January 2015, Chris Ham and others from the King's Fund produced a review of the government's health reforms. Their conclusions as far as the act was concerned were that:

- The reforms resulted in greater marketisation of the NHS but claims of mass privatisation were exaggerated
- The reforms resulted in top-down reorganisation of the NHS which was distracting and damaging
- New systems of governance and accountability are complex and confusing
- The absence of system leadership is increasingly problematic when the NHS needs to undertake major service changes

In November 2017, Jeremy Hunt in an interview with the Health Service Journal said "The idea of lots of competing foundation trusts and payment by results works well when you have in your mind that most of the work the NHS does will be single episode elective care, but when you're dealing with complex patients who are going in and out of the system a lot those structures prove not to be fit for purpose."

Nick Timmins, writing in 2018, concluded that the legislation, in its own terms, had failed. Choice and competition were not, as envisaged, the driving principles of the NHS. In fact the development of integrated care systems was unpicking the "purchaser/provider" split that had been the dominant theme of NHS management since 1991. The organisations set up by the act, Monitor and the NHS Trust Development Authority had effectively been merged. And there was nothing to suggest that "political micro-management" and "excessive bureaucratic and political control" had disappeared. However, he said the act had given the NHS an independent voice, and that according to Jeremy Hunt "the independence of NHS England is the bit that has worked best". David Benbow argued in 2020 that the legislation did not extend patient choice as envisaged (as this policy subsequently took a backseat) but that it did lead to an increasing amount of the NHS budget being diverted to private providers.

The publication of the NHS Long Term Plan in January 2019 marked the official abandonment of the policy of competition in the English NHS. Integrated care systems would be created across England by 2021, and in 2022 Clinical Commissioning Groups were abolished and NHS Improvement absorbed into NHS England, though all this was intended to happen without repealing the legislation. In February 2019, NHS England produced a document outlining changes it wanted to see in legislation. One of the central proposals was to remove the obligation to put services out to competitive tender if local commissioners considered a service would be best provided from within the NHS.

A report on the state of the NHS following the election of a Labour government in 2024, commissioned by Health Secretary Wes Streeting, led by the surgeon and former member of a Labour government Lord Ara Darzi (currently an independent peer) concluded that "The Health and Social Care Act of 2012 was a calamity without international precedent – it proved disastrous. The result of the disruption was a permanent loss of capability from the NHS". The act was an important part of the explanation for the deterioration in performance of the NHS as a whole, the report said. "Rather than liberating the NHS, as it had promised, the Health and Social Care Act 2012 imprisoned more than a million NHS staff in a broken system for the best part of a decade".

On 13 March 2025, then UK Prime Minister Keir Starmer announced the abolition of NHS England. Health Secretary Wes Streeting said this marked the "final nail in the coffin of the disastrous 2012 reorganisation, which led to the longest waiting times, lowest patient satisfaction, and most expensive NHS in history”. The Health Bill is the legislation that was established to abolish NHS England.

== See also ==
- Nicholson challenge
- National Health Action Party
- National Health Service Act 2006
- National Health Service Act 1977 (c 49)
- National Health Service and Community Care Act 1990 (c 19)
- NHS Redress Act 2006
- Health and wellbeing boards
