= David Nicholson (civil servant) =

English NHS administrator

Sir David Nicholson KCB CBE
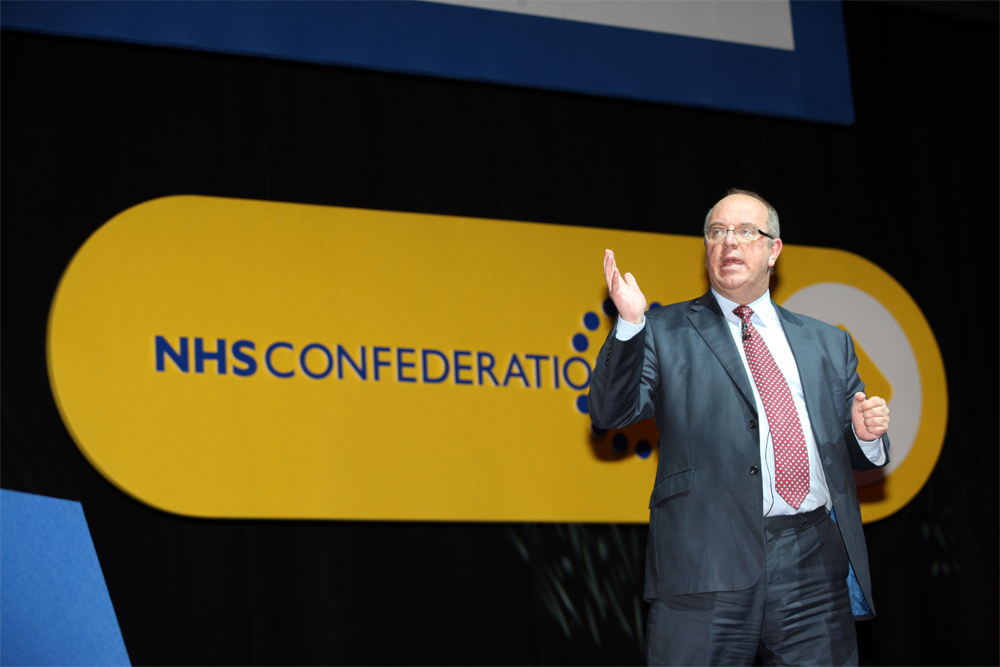
- David Nicholson on 22 December 2010

Chief Executive of NHS England
- In office September 2006 – 31 March 2014
- Preceded by: Sir Ian Carruthers
- Succeeded by: Simon Stevens

Personal details
- Party: Communist Party of Great Britain (before 1983)
- Spouse: Sarah-Jane Marsh
- Education: Forest Fields Grammar School; Bristol Polytechnic

Sir David Nicholson KCB CBE is a public policy analyst and NHS Manager who is the Chair of Sandwell and West Birmingham Hospitals NHS Trust. He was previously the Chief Executive of the National Health Service in England. He was appointed in October 2011 following the NHS reforms, having been seventh Chief executive of the NHS within the Department of Health since September 2006. He issued what has become known as the "Nicholson challenge" regarding the finances of the NHS. He retired from the role on 1 April 2014 in the wake of the Stafford Hospital scandal.

== Background ==
Nicholson was educated at Forest Fields Grammar School in Nottingham, and graduated from Bristol Polytechnic (now known as the University of the West of England) with a 2:1 in History and Politics.

He joined the Communist Party of Great Britain after graduation, and remained a member of the party until 1983.

== Career ==
=== Early career ===
Nicholson joined the NHS as a graduate trainee. For 10 years he worked in mental health, mainly in Yorkshire, where he was involved in implementing the policy of closing the old asylums and developing care in the community services.

=== Acute hospitals ===
In 1988, Nicholson moved into the acute hospital sector, appointed as the Chief executive of the Doncaster and Montague NHS Hospitals Trust, a first-wave NHS trust brought in under Prime Minister Margaret Thatcher. He introduced Clinical Directorates there in 1988 and the Trust was a national pilot for Total Quality Management.

Under his leadership the Trust promised all staff "a job for life, it may not be the job you are doing now, but you have a job for life with this trust". The promise was printed in various Trust documents including the "Strategic Direction". In 1997, he moved to the Trent NHS Regional Office as the Regional Director of Performance before being appointed as Regional Director in November 2000.

Nicholson was then made Regional Director for the old Eastern and West Midlands Regions between December 2001 and March 2002, combining these responsibilities with his Trent role whilst shadowing as Director of Health and Social Care (designate) for the Midlands and East of England. In April 2002 he formally took up the post of Director of Health and Social Care for the Midlands and East of England.

In 2003, he was appointed Chief executive of Birmingham and The Black Country Strategic Health Authority (BBC SHA). In August 2005 he was asked to take on the additional roles of Chief executive of neighbouring West Midlands South SHA and the Shropshire and Staffordshire SHA, during the period of the Stafford Hospital scandal.

In April 2006, he was appointed Chief executive of the newly formed London Strategic Health Authority. However he had little opportunity to make his mark, as it was announced on 27 July 2006 that he would be taking up the role of NHS Chief executive in September 2006 in charge of a £90bn budget and 1.3m employees, his fifth job-change in a year.

=== Mid-Staffordshire ===
Sir David was chief executive of the West Midlands Strategic Health Authority, the strategic health authority overseeing the Mid Staffordshire NHS Foundation Trust for a period when death rates were found to be high. Managers were too focused on finances and achieving targets, the then regulator, the Healthcare Commission found.

Sir David issued a full apology, saying "I apologise to them on behalf of the NHS as a whole and for the fact that those patients, relatives and carers found themselves in the position where they not only had terrible things happen to them but the very organisation they looked to for support let them down in the most devastating of ways."

Nonetheless campaigners whose family members died unnecessarily at the Stafford hospital have called for his resignation. An early day motion by Bristol MP Charlotte Leslie in February 2013 calling for Nicholson's resignation was supported by 20 MPs from both the ruling coalition Conservative party and the opposition Labour party.

=== Chief executive of NHS (2006–2014) ===
Nicholson became the seventh NHS Chief executive in September 2006.

In October 2011, he was appointed Chief executive of the NHS Commissioning Board Special Health Authority, a transitional body established in shadow form to set up the eventual NHS Commissioning Board. Its role is to make all the necessary preparations for the successful establishment of the NHS Commissioning Board (NHS CB) in April 2013. In the meantime, all current NHS planning and delivery responsibilities still remain with the Department of Health, strategic health authorities and primary care trusts. The NHS Commissioning Board was renamed 'NHS England' on 1 April 2013.

In September 2011, The Daily Telegraph revealed that Nicholson claimed expenses of over £50,000 a year on top of a basic salary of £200,000 and benefits in kind of £37,600 at a time when he was asking the health service to make cuts of £20 billion by 2015. His claim was three times an MP's accommodation allowance.

In May 2013, it was announced in advance that Nicholson would be retiring in March 2014 from his post as Chief executive of NHS England. His resignation was a sequel to the Stafford Hospital scandal, because it was he who was in charge of "the regional health authority responsible for the hospital" at the height of the failings between 2005 and 2006.

Health Secretary Jeremy Hunt praised Sir David's leadership, saying: "NHS waiting times have fallen, infection rates [have been] reduced, and mixed sex accommodation is at an all-time low. His job has often been incredibly complex and very difficult, and yet he has always had a reputation for staying calm, and maintaining a relentless focus on what makes a difference on the NHS frontline." He told Hunt that "in healthcare we harm 10 per cent of patients".

=== NHS chair ===
He was appointed interim Chair of Worcestershire Acute Hospitals NHS Trust in March 2018. He was later appointed to the role of Chair on a permanent basis during December 2018. He was announced as Chair of Sandwell and West Birmingham Hospitals NHS Trust in March 2021, replacing the retiring Richard Samuda from the beginning of May. In July 2022 he was also appointed chair of Dudley Group NHS Foundation Trust as he relinquished the job in Worcestershire.

== Cyprus ==
He was appointed chairman of the newly-established State Health Services Organisation in Cyprus in 2018.

== Personal life ==
He is divorced from his first wife; their family home was in Harrogate, and the couple have two sons. He is presently married to Sarah-Jane Marsh, who was a former intern on the NHS-graduate scheme, and became Chief executive of Birmingham Children's Hospital in 2009.

Nicholson is a supporter of Nottingham Forest Football Club.

== Honours ==
Nicholson was appointed Commander of the Order of the British Empire (CBE) in the 2004 New Year Honours. He received an honorary Doctorate from University of Central England, Birmingham. He was appointed Knight Commander of the Order of the Bath (KCB) in the 2010 New Year Honours.
