= Ian Carruthers =

British healthcare and academic administrator

Sir Ian Carruthers OBE

Chancellor of the University of the West of England
- Incumbent
- Assumed office 18 July 2011
- Preceded by: Elizabeth Butler-Sloss, Baroness Butler-Sloss

Interim Chief Executive of NHS England
- In office 7 March 2006 – September 2006
- Preceded by: Sir Nigel Crisp
- Succeeded by: David Nicholson

Personal details
- Born: Ian James Carruthers
- Children: 2

Sir Ian James Carruthers OBE is a British healthcare and academic administrator who was senior director for the National Health Service (NHS). Having first joined the NHS in 1969 as an administrator at Garlands Hospital, Carlisle, he rose through a career which included six months as the interim Chief Executive of the NHS in England during 2006. He has been the Chancellor of the University of the West of England since 2011.

== Early life ==
Carruthers grew up in a council house in Carlisle. He was a keen sportsman who won county caps for Cumbria in rugby union, cricket and soccer in his school days. He was offered a playing contract by Carlisle United football club but turned it down at the insistence of his father.

== NHS career ==
=== Regional health ===
Carruthers held management positions in Barnsley, Blackpool, Southend, Portsmouth and Plymouth before chief executive roles in Dorset and Somerset plus Hampshire and Isle of Wight regional health authorities.

He was appointed chief executive of the South West strategic health authority (SHA), known as NHS South West, on 1 July 2006. This SHA later "clustered" with NHS South East Coast and NHS South Central to become NHS South of England, led by Carruthers, ahead of the so-called "Lansley" reforms that signaled the end of SHAs, the Health and Social Care Act 2012.

Carruthers and the South West SHA were criticised by an employment tribunal following the dismissal by Royal Cornwall Hospitals NHS Trust of its chief executive John Watkinson; however an independent review conducted by Lucy Scott-Moncrieff, former president of The Law Society, concluded that there had been no impropriety. Mr Watkinson argued that his dismissal was because he had opposed SHA plans to reconfigure upper gastrointestinal services within the South West of England by centralising services at Plymouth on the grounds that there had been insufficient public consultation and the process was therefore illegal. Mr Watkinson took his case to an employment tribunal which held, unanimously, that Mr Watkinson had been unfairly dismissed. NHS Chief Executive Sir David Nicholson subsequently commissioned an independent review (conducted by Verita) "into the approach and behaviour of NHS South West in relation to the dismissal of John Watkinson by Royal Cornwall Hospitals NHS Trust". Its report concluded: "We consider that Sir Ian behaved correctly towards Mr Watkinson... The evidence provided to us shows that the SHA complied with its duty to assist and support RCHT in managing these difficult issues. There is no issue of impropriety or of pressure to dismiss Mr Watkinson."

=== Interim chief executive of NHS England ===
On 7 March 2006 he took over as acting NHS chief executive, following the departure of Sir Nigel Crisp. He held this position until September that year, being succeeded by David Nicholson.

=== Chair and advisory roles ===
In the past he was a member of the NHS Modernisation Board, the National Steering and Advisory Group for Shifting the Balance of Power within the NHS and he also served as a member on the Modernisation Action Team on Patient Access which contributed to the NHS Plan.

He has undertaken a review of innovation in healthcare, culminating in chairing the Innovation Health and Wealth Board which formed part of the government strategy for improving the spread of best practice in healthcare.

He has published several papers on reviewing and improving the NHS and he co-chaired the Prime Minister's Challenge on Dementia.

Carruthers served on the Department of Health Financial Strategy Steering Group and on the Strategic Health Authorities Chief Executives Reference Group on Delivering Race Equality in Mental Health. He chairs the public service consultancy 2020 Delivery.

== Chancellor of the University of the West of England ==
In May 2011 it was announced that Carruthers would be taking up the position of Chancellor of the University of the West of England. He was installed as Chancellor in a ceremony on 18 July.

== Publications ==
Carruthers is visiting senior fellow of the Health Services Management Centre at the University of Birmingham, where his published papers include:

- Improving HImPs: the Early Lessons (ref RR35; I Carruthers, J Shapiro, T Knight)
- Purchasing in the NHS: The Story so far (1995, ref DP34) (I Carruthers, D Fillingham, C Ham, J James)
- Doctors in Unit Management (ref HS16, I Carruthers, G Page, D White)
- Options for strengthening Unit management. The implications for personnel, financial and functional management, planning, monitoring and communications (1982; ref HS13) (I Carruthers, C Fewtrell, D White)
- Reviewing the strength of Unit nursing management: An audit approach (1981; ref HS12)

== Honours ==
Carruthers received an OBE in 1997, and a knighthood in the 2003 New Year Honours for services to the NHS. In 2009 he received an honorary degree of Doctor of Science (D.Sc.) from the University of the West of England. He was awarded an honorary degree of Doctor of Laws (LL.D) by the University of Bristol in July 2011.

=== Commonwealth honours ===
Country	Date	Appointment	Post-nominal letters
United Kingdom	1997–present	Officer of the Order of the British Empire	OBE
United Kingdom	2003–present	Knight Bachelor	Kt

=== Scholastic ===
Chancellor, visitor, governor, rector and fellowships

Location	Date	School	Position
England	18 July 2011 – present	University of the West of England	Chancellor

==== Honorary degrees ====
Location	Date	School	Degree	Gave Commencement Address
England	22 July 2009	University of Exeter	Doctor of Laws (LL.D)	
England	18 November 2009	University of the West of England	Doctor of Science (D.Sc.)	
England	20 July 2011	University of Bristol	Doctor of Laws (LL.D)	

=== Memberships and fellowships ===
Country	Date	Organisation	Position
United Kingdom		Faculty of Public Health at the Royal College of Physicians	Honorary Fellow

== Personal life ==
Carruthers is married with a son and daughter. He supports both Southampton Football Club and Somerset County Cricket Club.

Academic offices
Preceded by Elizabeth Butler-Sloss, Baroness Butler-Sloss	Chancellor of the University of the West of England; 2011–present	Incumbent
