= John Pritchard (bishop) =

British bishop

The Right Reverend John Pritchard
- Bishop of Oxford
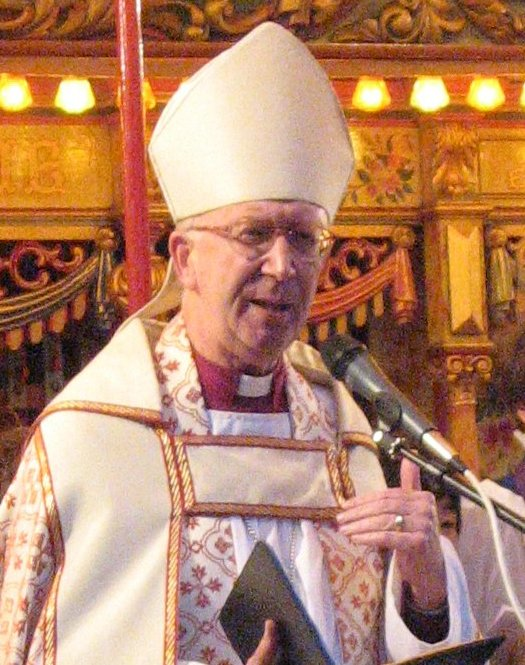
- Pritchard at the 2007 St Giles' Fair, Oxford
- Church: Church of England
- Diocese: Diocese of Oxford
- In office: 2007 – 31 October 2014 (retired)
- Predecessor: Richard Harries
- Successor: Steven Croft
- Other posts: Bishop of Jarrow; 2002–2006

Orders
- Ordination: 1972 (deacon); 1973 (priest)
- Consecration: January 2002 by David Hope

Personal details
- Born: 22 April 1948 (age 78) Salford, Lancashire, United Kingdom
- Denomination: Anglican
- Residence: Richmond, North Yorkshire
- Parents: Neil Pritchard, Winifred Savill
- Spouse: (Susan) Wendy Claridge
- Children: 2
- Education: St Peter's College, Oxford

Member of the House of Lords
- Lord Spiritual
- Bishop of Oxford; 25 November 2010 – 31 October 2014

John Lawrence Pritchard (born 22 April 1948) is a Church of England bishop. He was the Bishop of Oxford from 2007 to 2014. He is in the Open Evangelical tradition.

== Early life ==
Pritchard was born in Salford, Lancashire. He was educated at Arnold School, then an all-boys direct grant grammar school in Blackpool, Lancashire. He read jurisprudence at St Peter's College, Oxford, graduating with a Bachelor of Arts (BA) degree in 1970; as per tradition, his BA was promoted to an Oxford Master of Arts (MA Oxon) in 1973.

In 1970, Pritchard entered Ridley Hall, Cambridge, an Anglican theological college. He then studied theology and trained for ordination for the next two years. In 1972, he received a Certificate in Pastoral Theology.

== Ordained ministry ==
Pritchard was ordained in the Church of England as a deacon in 1972 and as a priest in 1973. From 1972 to 1976 he served as a curate at St Martin in the Bull Ring, Birmingham and, from 1976 to 1980, he was Youth Chaplain and assistant director of Education in the Diocese of Bath and Wells. In 1980 he became priest in charge of Wilton, Taunton. From 1988 he was Director of Pastoral Studies at Cranmer Hall, Durham and, from 1993, the college's warden. In 1996, he became Archdeacon of Canterbury and a canon residentiary of Canterbury Cathedral.

=== Episcopal ministry ===
In January 2002, Pritchard was consecrated as a bishop by David Hope, the Archbishop of York. Then, from 2002 to 2007, he served as the Bishop of Jarrow, a suffragan bishop in the Diocese of Durham.

On 11 December 2006 it was announced that Pritchard would become the 42nd Bishop of Oxford. Having taken office at his confirmation-of-election in London on 23 March 2007, he began his ministry in the diocese on 8 June 2007 after a service of inauguration at Christ Church Cathedral, Oxford. In 2008, he supported the application by Muslims in Oxford to broadcast the adhan from the minaret of a mosque. As a result, he received hostile comments and letters of complaint.

John Pritchard retired as Bishop of Oxford on 31 October 2014. In 2015, he was appointed an honorary assistant bishop of the Diocese of Durham.

On 11 February 2017, Pritchard was one of 14 retired bishops to sign an open letter to the then-serving bishops of the Church of England. In an unprecedented move, they expressed their opposition to the House of Bishops' report to General Synod on sexuality, which recommended no change to the church's canons or practices around sexuality. By 13 February, a serving bishop (Alan Wilson, Bishop of Buckingham) and nine further retired bishops had added their signatures; on 15 February, the report was rejected by synod.

== Personal life ==
Pritchard married Wendy, a graduate of St Hugh's College, Oxford, in 1972. The couple have two daughters, Amanda, former Chief Executive of NHS England, and Nicola. Following retirement Pritchard and his wife live in Richmond, North Yorkshire.

== Styles ==
- The Reverend John Pritchard (1972–1996)
- The Venerable John Pritchard (1996–2002)
- The Right Reverend John Pritchard (2002–present)

== Writings ==
- Practical Theology in Action, SPCK (1996), ISBN 0-281-05012-0
- The Intercessions Handbook, SPCK (1997), ISBN 0-281-04979-3
- Beginning Again, SPCK (2000), ISBN 0-281-05265-4
- Living the Gospel Stories Today, SPCK (2001), ISBN 0-281-05365-0
- How to Pray, SPCK (2002), ISBN 0-281-05454-1
- The Second Intercessions Handbook, SPCK (2004), ISBN 0-281-05649-8
- Living Easter Through the Year, SPCK (2005), ISBN 0-281-05709-5
- How to Explain Your Faith, SPCK (2006), ISBN 0-8146-3178-9
- The Life and Work of a Priest, SPCK (2007) ISBN 0-281-05748-6
- Going to Church, SPCK (2009) ISBN 978-0-281-05810-5
- God Lost and Found, SPCK (2011) ISBN 978-0-281-06352-9
- Living Faithfully: Following Christ in Everyday Life (2013) ISBN 9780281067626
- Why Christianity Makes Sense, SPCK (2014) ISBN 978-0-281-06764-0, eBook ISBN 978-0-281-06765-7
- How Do I Pray?: A Little Book Of Guidance (SPCK, 2015) ISBN 9780281073221
- Something More: Encountering the Beyond in the Everyday (SPCK, 2016) ISBN 9780281073528
- Five Events that Made Christianity: Christmas, Good Friday, Easter, Ascension and Pentecost (SPCK, 2018) ISBN 9780281078066
- Why Go to Church?: A Little Book Of Guidance (SPCK, 2019) ISBN 9780281074419
- Twenty Questions Jesus Asked: And How They Speak To Us Today (SPCK, 2022) ISBN 9780281085644
