= Deltex Medical Group =

Medical technology company in Chichester, UK

Deltex Medical Group is a medical technology company based in Chichester that produces blood monitoring and fluid management equipment for use in surgical operations.

It has sold 3000 of its main product, the ultrasound probe CardioQ-ODM, which measures the rate of blood flow from the heart. The company claims that it has been shown to reduce postoperative complications and reduce length of hospital stay. According to the National Institute for Health and Care Excellence it could save £1000 per operation and could be used on more than 800,000 patients a year. As it is inserted into the gullet, it reduces the risk of infection that comes with monitoring using a tube inserted through a vein into the heart. Each probe costs about £100.

It secured approval from the NHS Supply Chain in 2012 after a tender process, to sell cardiac output monitoring equipment to the NHS in England, meaning that individual NHS trusts did not have to go through a tender process. In November 2016 an NHS hospital bought six, the largest order since 2014. The cash crisis affecting the NHS has meant that few machines have been bought.

In 2011 the firm said that clinical awareness of optimising vascular fluids among surgery patients in the USA “remains some way behind the UK and continental Europe”.

Sir Duncan Nichol is a director of the firm.
