= Nick Timmins =

British author and journalist

Nicholas James Maxwell Timmins is a British author and journalist who writes about the welfare state and the National Health Service.

== Biography ==
Timmins attended Kingswood School in Bath, followed by Regent's Park College, Oxford, where he graduated with a degree in English Language & Literature in 1971.

== Career ==
He was the Health and Social Services Correspondent of The Times and then The Independent. From 1996 to 2011 he was public policy editor of the Financial Times. He is now a senior fellow at the Institute for Government and the King’s Fund and a Senior Associate of the Nuffield Trust www.nuffieldtrust.org.uk. He is a visiting professor in social policy at the London School of Economics and was president of the Social Policy Association between 2008 and 2011.

== Bibliography ==
- The Five Giants, A biography of the Welfare State, Fontana Press, 1996, ISBN 0006863183
- Glaziers and window breakers, The role of the Secretary of State for Health, in their own words, Health Foundation, 2015
- The Covid-19 vaccination programme: Trials, tribulations and successes. Health Foundation 2022 ISBN 978-1-915303-00-4
