= Amanda Pritchard =

British healthcare official

Dame Amanda Pritchard DBE
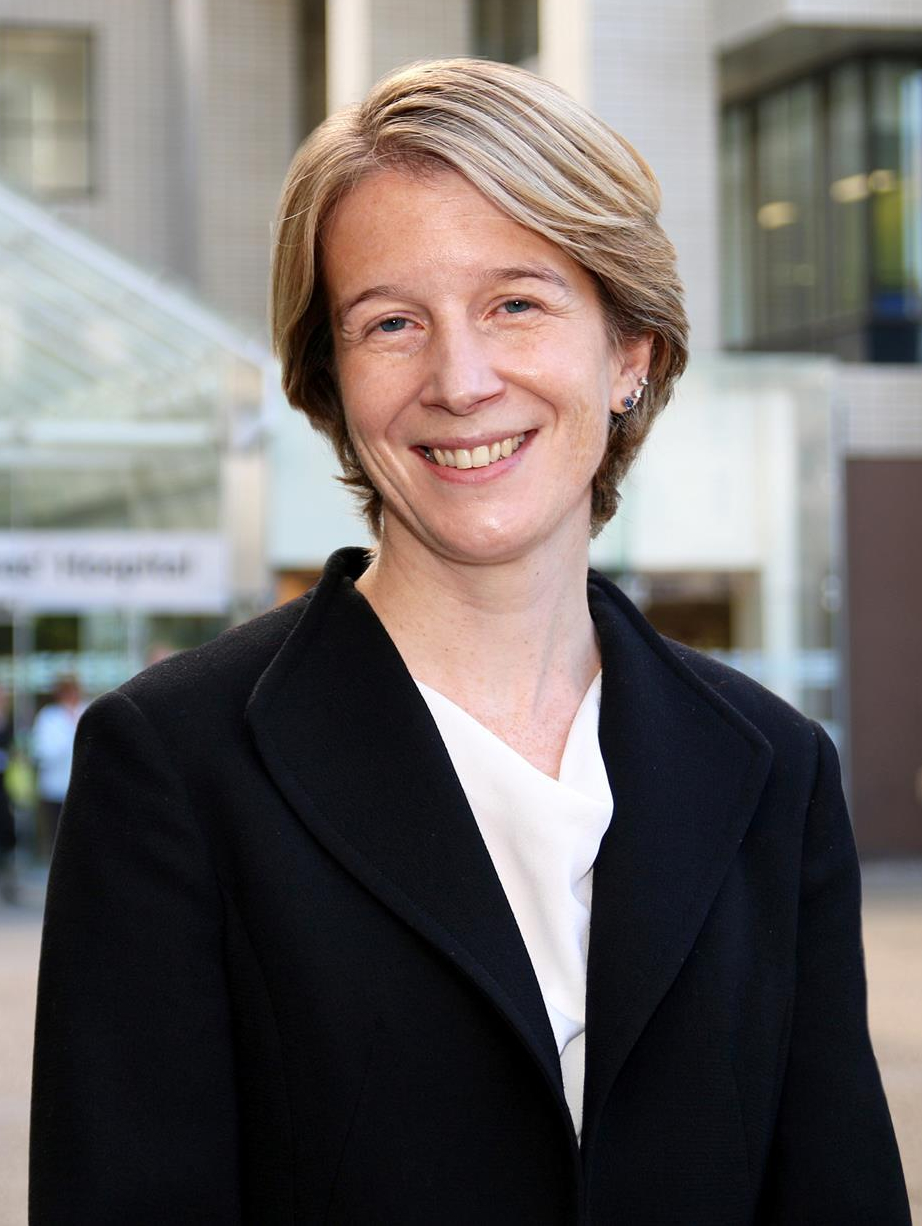
- Official portrait, c. 2021

Chief Executive of NHS England
- In office 1 August 2021 – 31 March 2025
- Preceded by: Simon Stevens
- Succeeded by: Jim Mackey

Chief Executive of NHS Improvement
- In office 5 June 2019 – 3 August 2021
- Succeeded by: Stephen Powis (interim)

Personal details
- Born: May 1976 (age 50) Somerset
- Children: 3
- Parent: John Pritchard (father)
- Education: Durham Johnston Comprehensive School
- Alma mater: St Anne's College, Oxford
- Amanda Pritchard's voice Pritchard speaks at a government press conference on the COVID-19 pandemic Recorded 30 November 2021

Dame Amanda Kate Pritchard (born May 1976) is the Chief Executive of Guys & St Thomas NHS Trust, the country's largest hospital group. She was previously the Chief Executive of NHS England from 1 August 2021 until 31 March 2025. Previously, Pritchard was chief operating officer of NHS England and chief executive of NHS Improvement from 2019 to 2021. She was chief executive of Guy's and St Thomas' NHS Foundation Trust from January 2016 to July 2019, having been acting chief executive from October 2015 to January 2016.

== Early and personal life ==
Pritchard was born in May 1976 in Somerset, the daughter of John Pritchard, later a Church of England bishop. She grew up in County Durham, attending Durham Johnston Comprehensive School. She graduated from St Anne's College at the University of Oxford with a degree in modern history. Whilst a student, she was the librarian of The Oxford Union.

Pritchard is married with three children.

== Career ==
Pritchard joined the NHS Management Training Scheme in 1997 and has worked for the NHS for her entire career.

In 2002, she became a manager at Chelsea and Westminster Hospital NHS Foundation Trust. From 2005 to 2006, Pritchard was the health team leader of the Prime Minister's Delivery Unit under Tony Blair, before returning to Chelsea and Westminster Hospital NHS Foundation Trust in 2006 as deputy chief executive, aged 29. Six years later she moved to Guy's and St Thomas' NHS Foundation Trust as chief operating officer and was appointed as its first-ever female chief executive in 2015.

On 5 June 2019, Pritchard moved to NHS England and NHS Improvement as COO of NHS England and CEO of NHS Improvement. Effectively the deputy CEO of the NHS, she led it operationally through COVID-19, the vaccine rollout, and its recovery, including service transformation, digitisation, and patient care improvements.

Long seen as the frontrunner to replace Simon Stevens as CEO of the NHS, it was announced on 28 July 2021 that Pritchard would be appointed as the next chief executive of NHS England; she took up the post on 1 August 2021 as the first woman in the role. On 3 August 2021 she was replaced as CEO of NHS Improvement by Stephen Powis on an interim basis.

On 14 December 2021 she joined Prime Minister Boris Johnson and Health Secretary Sajid Javid in calling for volunteers to come forward to help with the COVID vaccine booster campaign.

On 25 September 2023 Pritchard was appointed to the National Theatre Board.

The Labour Government elected in July 2024 declared it had "full confidence" in Pritchard as head of the NHS. She has spoken about the need to address the NHS's 'productivity challenges' and emergency winter pressures.

On 25 February 2025 Pritchard announced her resignation as CEO of NHS England following meetings with Health Secretary Wes Streeting and the government’s decision to abolish NHS England.
