= NHS mandate =

The Health and Social Care Act 2012 established NHS England and provides that the Secretary of State is to publish, annually, a document known as the NHS mandate which specifies the objectives which the Board should seek to achieve. National Health Service (Mandate Requirements) Regulations are published each year to give legal force to the mandate.

== 2014–15 ==
The mandate centred on uncontroversial ambitions: reducing rates of premature death, enhancing quality of life for people with long-term conditions, enhancing recovery.

== 2016–17 ==
There was a consultation process for the 2016 to 2017 mandate in the autumn of 2015. It was criticised as having little publicity.

== 2017–18 ==
The mandate for 2017–18 centred on the implementation of the Five Year Forward View. It required NHS England to provide weekend and evening access to primary care for 40% of the population by the end of 2017–18 and set goals to improve the performance of Accident and Emergency departments with the majority of trusts meeting the 95% target in March 2018. It promised to reduce bed-blocking to 3.5%, the equivalent of releasing more than 2000 extra beds a day. This is to be achieved by NHS trusts integrating social care services for elderly patients.

It includes proposals to improve the collection of data about incidence, prevalence, clinical activity and outcomes of musculoskeletal patients and services in England.

Chris Hopson, Chief executive of NHS Providers, representing NHS foundation trusts responded by saying "Taken together with the other commitments set out in the document, the gap between demands on the health service and the resources available in the coming year remains unbridgeable. We maintain that just stabilising the deterioration in performance would be an achievement in itself."
