= Chief Executive of NHS England =

Head of the National Health Service in England

The chief executive of NHS England is the head of the National Health Service in England, and is a senior medical management adviser to the Government of the United Kingdom. The chief executive directs the governing body of the NHS, and is the highest-ranking member of the Health Service's board. There have been nine chief executives of NHS England since the post was established in 1985, following the report and recommendation of Roy Griffiths.

== List of officeholders ==
1. Victor Paige 1985–1986 (1.5 years, as chair)
2. Len Peach 1986–1989 (3 years)
3. Duncan Nichol 1989–1994 (5 years)
4. Alan Langlands 1994–2000 (6 years)
5. Nigel Crisp 1 November 2000 – 6 March 2006 (5.5 years)
6. Ian Carruthers 7 March 2006 – September 2006 (interim for 6 months)
7. David Nicholson September 2006 – 31 March 2014 (6.5 years at the Department of Health and 1 year at NHS England)
8. Simon Stevens 1 April 2014 – 31 July 2021 (7 years)
9. Amanda Pritchard 1 August 2021 – 31 March 2025 (3.5 years)
10. Jim Mackey 1 April 2025 – present

== Status ==
From 1985 until 2013, the NHS Executive and its predecessor bodies formed part of England's Department of Health (now Department of Health and Social Care). Since April 2013, NHS England has been an independent statutory body. It has been argued that NHS England's independence gives the Chief Executive "the potential to be a prominent national figure able to speak on behalf of the NHS". Its clinicians, managers and health experts are employed as public officials not as civil servants.

In March 2025, the Starmer government announced that NHS England would be abolished and that the NHS would move away from clinical and expert leadership, to political management.
