= Duncan Kirkbride Nichol =

British hospital administrator (born 1941)

Sir Duncan Kirkbride Nichol CBE (born 30 May 1941) is a British hospital administrator who was the third Chief Executive of the National Health Service Management Executive from 1989 to 1994.

He was born in Bradford, Yorkshire, to James Nichol and Mabel Kirkbride. He was educated at Bradford Grammar School and the University of St Andrews in Fife, Scotland. He joined the NHS in 1963 as a graduate trainee, and worked his way up in St Thomas's Hospital and Manchester Royal Infirmary, from senior administrative assistant to regional general manager of the Mersey Regional Health Authority. He has been Chairman of the Academy for Healthcare Science, Her Majesty’s Courts Service, Skills for Justice, the Parole Board for England and Wales and Synergy Healthcare. He is a director of Deltex Medical Group.

He was a non-executive director of the Christie Hospital from 2008 and deputy chairman from 2009 until 2012, when he was appointed Chair of the Countess of Chester Hospital NHS Foundation Trust. He announced his retirement in November 2019.

He was appointed a Commander of the Order of the British Empire in the 1989 New Year Honours and knighted in the 1993 New Year Honours.
