= Chris Ham =

British political scientist

Sir Chris Ham CBE DL
- Born: 15 May 1951 (age 75)
- Other name: Political scientist (public health policy)
- Occupation: Chief executive of the King's Fund

Sir Chris Ham CBE DL (born 15 May 1951), is a health policy academic who started life as a political scientist. He was chief executive of the King's Fund from 2010 to 2018. He was professor of health policy and management at University of Birmingham's health services management centre from 1992 to 2010. He was seconded to the Department of Health where he was Director of the Strategy Unit working with Alan Milburn and John Reid until 2004.

He was said to be "unrivalled in his ability to distil and synthesise complex policy developments and present them in a clear and digestible manner for non-specialists" in 1999. He is frequently called upon to chair large conferences on health policy in England.

He was said by the Health Service Journal to be the 38th most powerful person in the English NHS in December 2013.

Ham was appointed CBE in 2004 and in the June 2018 Birthday Honours he was knighted for his services. He was elected a Fellow of the Academy of Medical Sciences (FMedSci) in 1998.

He was appointed as independent chair of the Coventry and Warwickshire sustainability and transformation partnership in January 2019. He is also Co-Chair of the NHS Assembly and a non-executive director of the Royal Free London NHS Foundation Trust.

== Publications ==
- Working together for Health: achievements and challenges in the Kaiser NHS Beacon Sites Programme, 2010
- Transforming the Delivery of Health and Social Care: The Case for Fundamental Change with Anna Dixon and Beatrice Brooke, 2012
- Commissioning integrated care in a liberated NHS, 2011
- Health policy in Britain (6 Editions)
- The Politics of NHS Reform, 1988-97: Metaphor or Reality?, 2000
- Management and Competition in the NHS, 1997
- The Policy Process in the Modern Capitalist State, with Michael Hill (Jan 1993)
