= Nigel Crisp, Baron Crisp =

British civil servant (born 1952)

The Right Honourable The Lord Crisp KCB
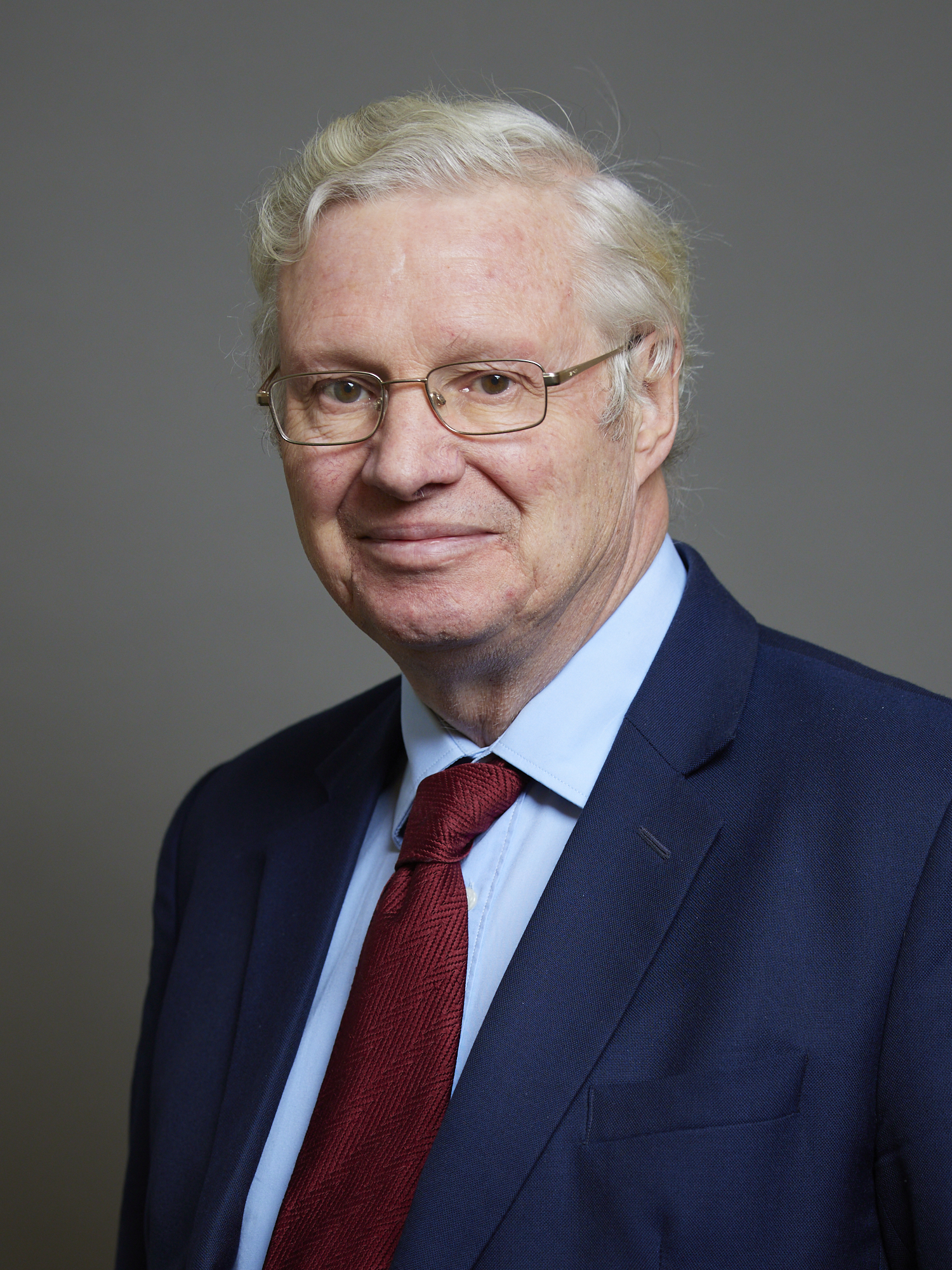
- Official portrait, 2022

Chief Executive of NHS England
- In office 1 November 2000 – 6 March 2006
- Preceded by: Alan Langlands
- Succeeded by: Sir Ian Carruthers

Member of the House of Lords
- Lord Temporal
- Life peerage 28 April 2006

Personal details
- Born: Edmund Nigel Ramsay Crisp; 14 January 1952 (age 74)
- Children: 2
- Education: Uppingham School
- Alma mater: St John's College, Cambridge

Edmund Nigel Ramsay Crisp, Baron Crisp KCB (born 14 January 1952) is a crossbench member of the House of Lords where he co chairs the All-Party Parliamentary Group on Global Health. He works and publishes extensively in global health and international development. He was a British senior civil servant in the Department of Health, public policy analyst, and Senior Manager in the NHS. He was awarded a life peerage upon retirement.

== Background and personal life ==
Crisp was educated at Uppingham School and then studied philosophy at St John's College, Cambridge.

Crisp is married with two children, and lives in the countryside near Newbury. His interests include the countryside, gardening and painting.

== Career ==
Crisp joined the NHS in 1986 from a background in community work, where he worked in Liverpool and Cambridgeshire, and industry and (from 1981 to 1986) was Secretary and Director of Age Concern Cambridge. He then became the General Manager for Learning Disabilities in East Berkshire and moved in 1988 to become General Manager (and later Chief Executive) of Heatherwood and Wexham Park Hospitals which provided a wide range of general hospital and mental health services in East Berkshire. He moved to Oxford in 1993 to become Chief Executive of the Oxford Radcliffe Hospitals NHS Trust which at the time incorporated the John Radcliffe and Churchill Hospitals and is one of the largest academic medical centres in the country. Crisp became South Thames Regional Director of the NHS Executive in 1997 and London Regional Director in 1999.

Crisp was appointed as the fifth chief executive of the NHS and Permanent Secretary at the Department of Health on 1 November 2000. He is unlike his predecessors or successor in combining these posts. On 8 March 2006 Crisp announced his intention to retire at the end of March, acknowledging the current financial problems of parts of the NHS as a disappointment. He was praised by the prime minister, Tony Blair, for his contribution to British healthcare and was created Baron Crisp, of Eaglescliffe in the County of Durham, on 28 April 2006. He was replaced by Sir Ian Carruthers, as acting NHS Chief Executive, and Hugh Taylor, the Director of Strategy and Business Development, as acting Permanent Secretary.

The Kings Fund has reported that during Crisp's tenure the English NHS began the greatest improvement in its history. Major reforms were introduced including patient choice, the engagement of the private sector, nurse prescribing and much more. Major service improvements also began.

Service improvements by the end of 2005 included 99% of patients being able to see a GP within two working days, 99.8% with suspected cancer saw a specialist within 2 weeks, 99% of women with breast cancer began treatment within 4 weeks of referral, and the A and E target of everyone seen or admitted within 4 hours was exceeded with 99% doing so.

Surgical waiting times fell to a maximum of 6 months for admission and 3 months for an outpatient appointment (with only 12 patients waiting longer than this for admission to English hospitals and 18 waiting longer for an outpatient appointment). In 2000 some patients had been waiting more than two years for admission. Activity levels increased at the same time with admissions up 16% in five years to 10,050,000 by March 2005 and A and E attendances up 27% to 16,712,000.

He described his time as Chief Executive in 24 Hours to Save the NHS, OUP 2011. He has also argued that there are lessons from the period which it is vital to learn in 2024 in order to revive the NHS.

In 2016, a biography of Tony Blair – Broken Vows: Tony Blair, The Tragedy of Power by British author Tom Bower, reported Ken Anderson's comment "Crisp had no control over costs and didn’t have a clue what to do", following the former's investigation into why the NHS accounts were six months late. Bowers describes that after an assessment by management consultants McKinsey & Company, Tony Blair and Secretary of State for Health Patricia Hewitt decided Crisp should be replaced, and part of the method used to induce Crisp to resign at age 54 was to award him a life peerage.

== Global health and international development ==
Nigel Crisp has been very active in global health and international development since 2006; most notably publishing in 2007 Global Health Partnerships - a report for the prime minister on what more the UK can do to support health improvement in developing countries; co-chairing, with Commissioner Bience Gawanas of the African Union, a Task Force on scaling up the education and training of health workers on behalf of the Global Health Workforce Alliance which resulted in the publication of Scaling up, Saving lives in 2008; and founding, with the Zambian Ministry of Health, The Zambia UK Health Workforce Alliance in 2009.

He writes and speaks widely on global health and his book Turning the world upside down - the search for global health was published in 2010. It described what richer countries could learn about health from people in low- and middle-income countries and argued for greater partnership and mutual learning between countries. The book proved very influential. A second edition was published in 2022. As Patron of THET (The Tropical Health and Education Trust) he has continued to develop and support partnerships around the world.

In 2018 he founded and subsequently co-chaired with Sheila Tlou, the former health minister of Botswana, Nursing Now. Nursing Now was designed to raise the profile and status of nurses globally and was very successful with 126 countries joining the campaign with more than 750 national, regional and local groups active when it concluded in May 2021. It was succeeded by the Nursing Now Challenge which aims to provide leadership development opportunities for 100,000 young nurses and midwives globally. See https://www.nursingnow.org/

He chaired Sightsavers International from 2007 to 2013, is a vice-chair of the All Party Parliamentary Group on Global Health, is a Senior Fellow of the Institute for Healthcare Improvement, a Distinguished Visiting Fellow at the Harvard School of Public Health and an Honorary Professor at the London School of Hygiene and Tropical Medicine.

== Honours ==
He was appointed Knight Commander of the Order of the Bath (KCB) in the New Years Honours 2003.

== Books ==
- Crisp N. Health is Made at Home, Hospitals are for Repairs; Salus, 2020
- Crisp, N. Turning the world upside down - the search for global health in the 21st Century, CRC Press, 2010
- Crisp, N. 24 hours to save the NHS: The Chief Executive's account of reform 2000 - 2006, Oxford University Press, 2011
- Crisp, N. & Omaswa, F (ed.) African health leaders: Making change and claiming the future, Oxford University Press, 2014
- Crisp, N. Turning the world upside down again - Global health in a time of pandemics, climate change and political turmoil , CRC Press, 2022

== Arms ==
Coat of arms of Nigel Crisp, Baron Crisp

Adopted
2008
Coronet
Coronet of a Baron
Crest
Upon a Helm with a Wreath Argent Gules and Azure a Caladrius wings elevated and addorsed Argent beaked and legged and supporting with the dexter foot a demi Sun in Splendour Or
Escutcheon
Argent three Piles issuing in base each per pale Azure and Gules and terminating in a demi Eagle displayed also per pale Azure and Gules beaked Or
Supporters
On the dexter a Dragon reguardant Gules armed and gorged with a Crown Rayonny Or on the sinister a winged Unicorn reguardant Azure armed unguled and gorged with a Crown Rayonny Or
Motto
PROFUNDUS DEFINITUS ET AEQUSS
Badge
A demi Dragon displayed Gules and conjoined in base with a demi Dragon displayed and reversed Azure
Symbolism
The piles terminating in eagles refer to Eaglescliffe. The caladrius, notable for its healing properties, is an allusion to the grantee's career culminating in his becoming Chief Executive of the National Health Service. Bestiary writers state that the caladrius drew the sickness out of an invalid with its eyesight before flying up to the sun where the heat consumed the disease and restored the patient to health. The caladrius is therefore combined with a sun in the Crest. The unicorn is another creature reputed to have healing properties. The dragons in the Supporters and Badge are a reference to the grantee's wife who has Welsh ancestry.

Government offices
Preceded by Christopher Kelly (civil servant)	Permanent Secretary at the Department of Health; 2000–2006	Succeeded by Hugh Taylor

Orders of precedence in the United Kingdom
Preceded by The Lord Davidson of Glen Cova	Gentlemen; Baron Crisp	Followed by The Lord Lee of Trafford
