= NHS England =

Oversight body for the National Health Service in England

Public body overview
- Jurisdiction: England
- Headquarters: Leeds, England
- Employees: 13,500
- Annual budget: £181.4 billion (2024–25)
- Minister responsible: Yvette Cooper, Secretary of State for Health and Social Care
- Public body executives: Dr Penny Dash, chair; Sir James Mackey, chief executive
- Parent department: Department of Health and Social Care
- Parent public body: NHS
- Key documents: Health and Social Care Act 2012; Health and Care Act 2022
- Website: www.england.nhs.uk

NHS England is an executive non-departmental public body of the Department of Health and Social Care. It oversees the budget, planning, delivery and day-to-day operation of the commissioning side of the National Health Service in England as set out in the Health and Social Care Act 2012. It directly commissions NHS general practitioners, dentists, optometrists and some specialist services.

A two-year process abolishing NHS England, cutting about half its 16,000 staff and transferring its functions into the Department of Health and Social Care, began in 2025.

== History ==
NHS England, formerly the NHS Commissioning Board and, before that, the NHS Commissioning Board Authority, was set up as a special health authority of the NHS on 31 October 2011, as the forerunner to becoming a non-departmental body on 1 April 2013. It was rebranded as NHS England on 26 March 2013, before a formal change of name under the Health and Care Act 2022.

NHS England combines previously amalgamated bodies, such as NHS Improvement which itself brought together several entities such as Monitor and the NHS Trust Development Authority.

Sir David Nicholson, who became chief executive on the establishment of the Board, retired in 2014 and was replaced by Simon Stevens. One of Stevens' first acts was to announce a restructure of the 27 area teams, in response to a requirement to reduce running costs, which would reduce staffing by around 500. The 27 teams outside London were reduced to 12 in 2015. Amanda Pritchard, the chief operating officer of NHS England, was promoted to chief executive on 1 August 2021. In 2022 Parliament, at the prompting of the Conservative Government, legislated to formally merge various bodies into NHS England, and put the resulting organisation on an independent legal footing.

In March 2025, Labour prime minister Keir Starmer announced that NHS England would be abolished and its functions absorbed into the Department of Health and Social Care, placing it under ministerial control as it had been until 2012. This was confirmed in the King's speech opening Parliament in May 2026. The reason stated by the government was that a 2012 reorganisation had made NHS healthcare in England bureaucratic and inefficient, and that healthcare should be overseen by politicians rather than an arm's-length body, to provide greater accountability. Health secretary Wes Streeting said the merger would take about two years, and that the 2012 reorganisation had "led to the longest waiting times, lowest patient satisfaction, and most expensive NHS in history".

In November 2025, expected job losses from the abolition of NHS England and restructuring of integrated care boards were reported to be around 18,000, with redundancy costs of around £1bn in the current year. It was planned that the remaining NHS England staff would move into the department, but since significantly higher pay rates apply to NHS staff than to civil servants of similar rank, it was reported that a new body might be set up to employ them.

== Functions ==
=== System management ===
The Secretary of State annually publishes the NHS mandate, a document which specifies the objectives which the Board should seek to achieve. National Health Service (Mandate Requirements) Regulations are likewise published each year to give legal force to the mandate.

NHS England produced a planning document – the Five Year Forward View – in October 2014 which envisaged development of new models to suit local needs. In conjunction with the other central regulators, the organisation established what is called a "success regime" in south and mid Essex, North Cumbria and north east and western Devon in June 2015. It was intended to tackle "deep rooted and systemic issues that previous interventions have not tackled across [a] whole health and care economy".

In 2016, it organised the geographical division of England into 44 sustainability and transformation plan areas, with populations between 300,000 and 3 million. These areas were locally agreed between NHS Trusts, local authorities and clinical commissioning groups (CCGs). A leader was appointed for each area, who is to be responsible for the implementation of the plans which are to be agreed by the component organisations. They will be "working across organisational boundaries to help build a consensus for transformation and the practical steps to deliver it".

In April 2017, it introduced a capped expenditure process, applied to NHS commissioners and providers in the 13 areas across England with the largest budget deficits. It was intended to reduce their spending by around £500 million, and health leaders were told to "think the unthinkable".

In 2022, there were seven regional teams and 10,640 full time equivalent staff.

==== Funding of clinical commissioning groups ====
Prior to the abolition of clinical commissioning groups in 2022, NHS England allocated funding (£69.5 billion in 2016/2017) to them in accordance with a funding formula. Until 2016, progress towards the amount indicated by the formula from the historical allocation was slow, and CCGs which were above their allocation did not suffer a reduction. From April 2016, however, CCGs with more than 10 per cent above their fair share were to receive "flat cash" – an effective reduction. This would also ensure than no CCG was more than 5 per cent below its target allocation in 2016/2017.

==== Operational pressures escalation levels framework ====
In October 2016, it introduced the Operational Pressures Escalation Levels (OPEL) system for the management of operational difficulties in English hospitals, replacing the system of red and black alerts which was locally defined. OPELs range from 1 (normal) to 4 (a major crisis requiring external intervention either regionally or nationally). This is intended, among other things, to enable comparisons of trends over time and between areas.

==== Response to 2020 pandemic ====
In view of the coronavirus pandemic, the Secretary of State for Health and Social Care directed the NHS England to buy services from the private sector, thereby bypassing CCGs. The Exercise of Commissioning Functions by the NHS Commissioning Board (Coronavirus) Directions 2020 came into force on 20 March 2020, and were revised to widen the definition of independent providers on 27 March. The directive also allowed NHS England to exercise functions normally carried out by CCGs, as the Board deemed appropriate. The direction was in place until the end of 2020.

=== Primary care ===
Applications by GPs to reduce their catchment area are dealt with by NHS England.

In November 2014, Mr Justice Popplewell declared that NHS England "has acted unlawfully by reason of its failure to make arrangements for the involvement of patients in primary care commissioning decisions as required by the National Health Service Act 2006". The case involved the decision to scrap the minimum practice income guarantee. Richard Stein, a partner at Leigh Day, said the declaration could mean that patients would have to be involved in discussions on changes to the GP contract.

NHS England awarded a four-year contract to Capita to become sole provider of administrative services including payment administration, management of medical records, and eligibility lists for practitioners for GPs, opticians and dentists across the UK in June 2015.

=== Information technology ===
The organisation was reported to be developing a strategy to support the use of personal health records in June 2015. This, it is hoped, could achieve up to £3.4 billion in annual efficiency savings by 2020. In April 2016 it published an index of digital maturity, where each of the 239 NHS trusts assessed its own "readiness", "capabilities" and "enabling infrastructure".

In 2018, the NHS app was unveiled, with public backing from Matt Hancock, who presented it as the key to a radical overhaul of NHS technology.

The NHS Long Term Plan set a target for all secondary care providers to move to digital records by 2024, which "will cover clinical and operational processes across all settings, locations and departments and be based on robust, modern IT infrastructure services for hosting, storage, networks and cyber security."

In 2020, the NHS awarded an emergency contract to Palantir Technologies for the creation of a Covid Data Store system for a statutory fee of £1. Palantir then won a £23.5 million contract with the NHS to continue with its work in December 2020. Palantir's involvement with the NHS was subject to criticism from civil liberties groups, including Open Democracy.

In 2023, the NHS began a procurement process for a Federated Data Platform(FDP). This would enable every hospital trust and integrated care system to have their own platform through which they could connect and share information between them where helpful. The FDP would build on the work done with the Covid Data Store. The contract could be worth up to £480 million. Palantir are widely thought to be the frontrunners to win. This has prompted further criticism from civil liberties groups.

=== Specialised commissioning ===
Specialised services are those provided in relatively few hospitals and accessed by comparatively small numbers of patients, but with catchment populations of usually more than one million. These services tend to be located in specialised hospital trusts that can recruit a team of staff with the appropriate expertise. NHS England is responsible for commissioning £19.3 billion of specialised services in 2021-2 and for dealing with individual funding requests in respect of the specialist services it commissions. There are proposals to move some of this commissioning to integrated care systems. The Shelford Group expressed concerns in May 2022 about services "where the numbers and evidence base supports the planning and provision of care being done at a population size larger than a typical ICS footprint."

In 2015, there was criticism of delays in deciding on a policy for the prescription of Everolimus in the treatment of tuberous sclerosis. Twenty doctors addressed a letter to the board in support of the charity Tuberous Sclerosis Association saying "around 32 patients with critical need, whose doctors believe everolimus treatment is their best or only option, have no hope of access to funding. Most have been waiting many months. Approximately half of these patients are at imminent risk of a catastrophic event (renal bleed or kidney failure) with a high risk of preventable death."

It authorises and pays for treatment of narcolepsy with sodium oxybate by means of individual funding requests on the basis of exceptional circumstances. In May 2016 the High Court ordered NHS England to provide funding to treat a teenager with severe narcolepsy. The judge criticised their "thoroughly bad decision" and "absurd" policy discriminating against the girl when hundreds of other NHS patients already receive the drug. The Department of Health is also paying for the treatment of people whose narcolepsy was caused by the swine flu vaccine Pandemrix in 2009–10 by means of private prescriptions outside the National Health Service.

In May 2022, it produced guidance that said 65 of the 154 services they commissioned were ready and suitable to be devolved to the integrated care systems. It is expected that most will be jointly commissioned with their neighbours, rather than on their own.

=== Arbitration ===
The organisation's responsibilities include arbitration in disputes between Integrated Care Boards and NHS trusts.
