= King's Fund =

Organization involved with the health system in England

The King's Fund
- Purpose: Public health think tank
- Headquarters: London
- Region served: England
- Chief Executive: Sarah Woolnough
- Website: www.kingsfund.org.uk

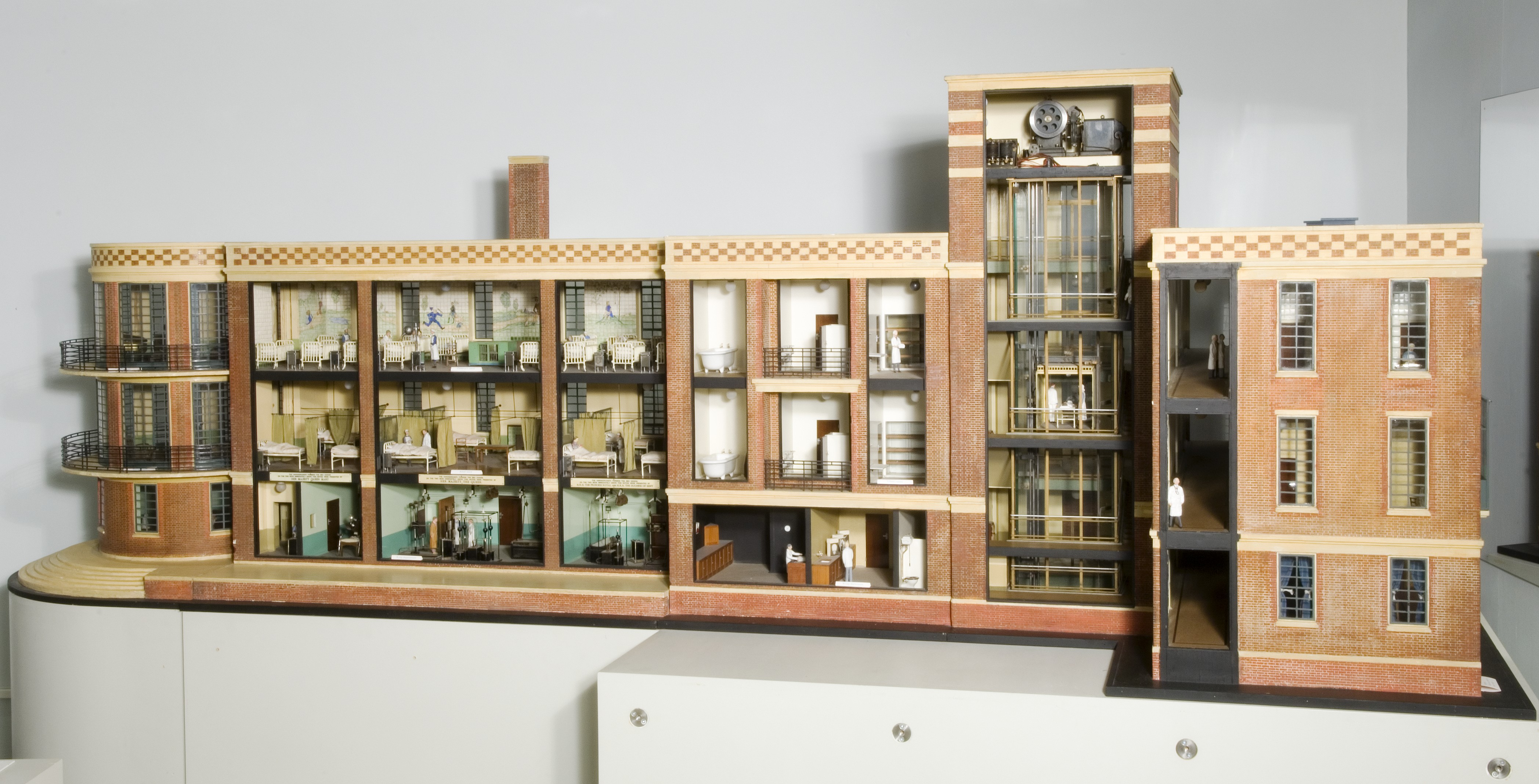
Model of a hospital promoting the King Edward's Hospital Fund, 1932

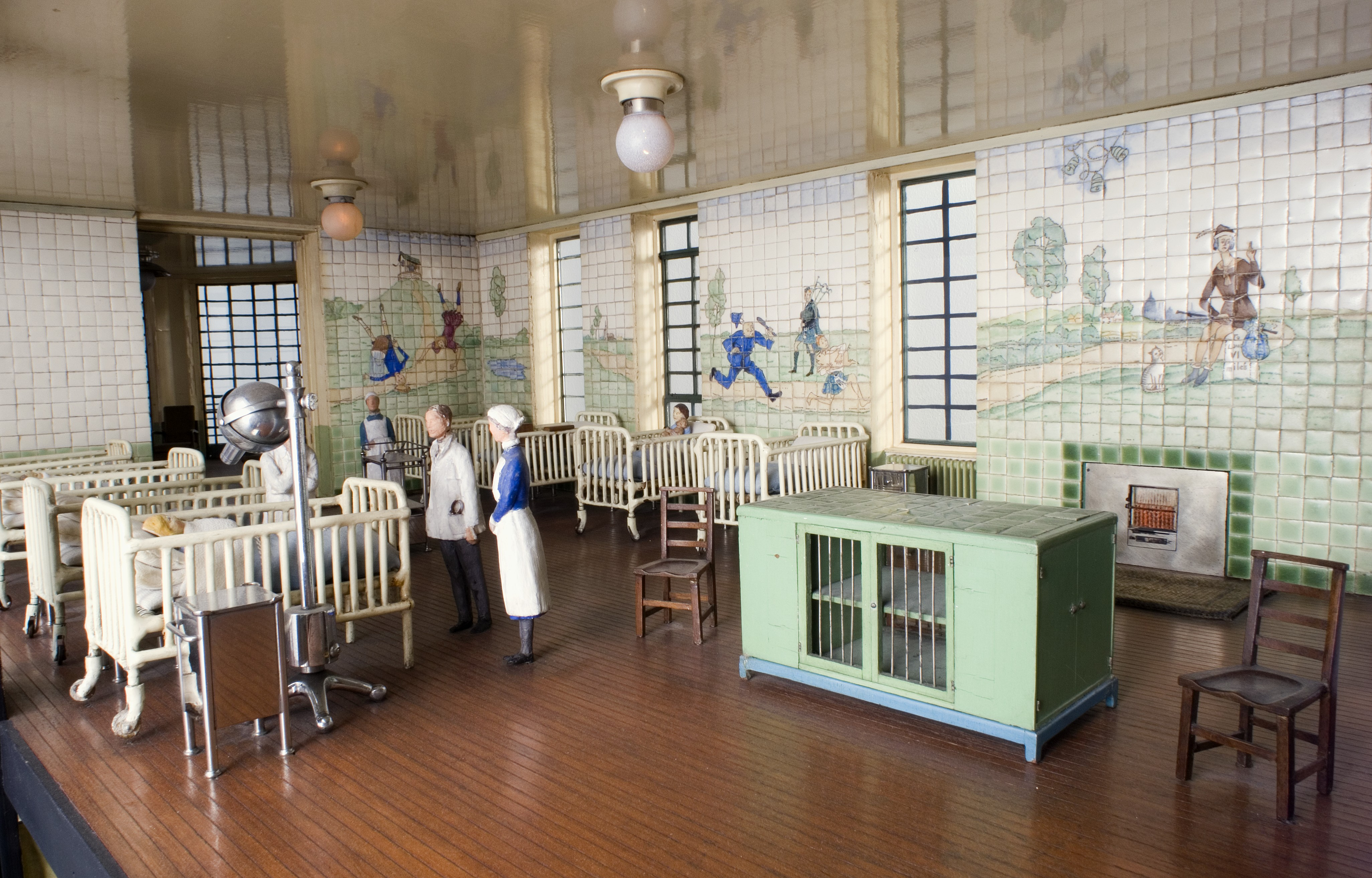
Model of a hospital promoting the King Edward's Hospital Fund

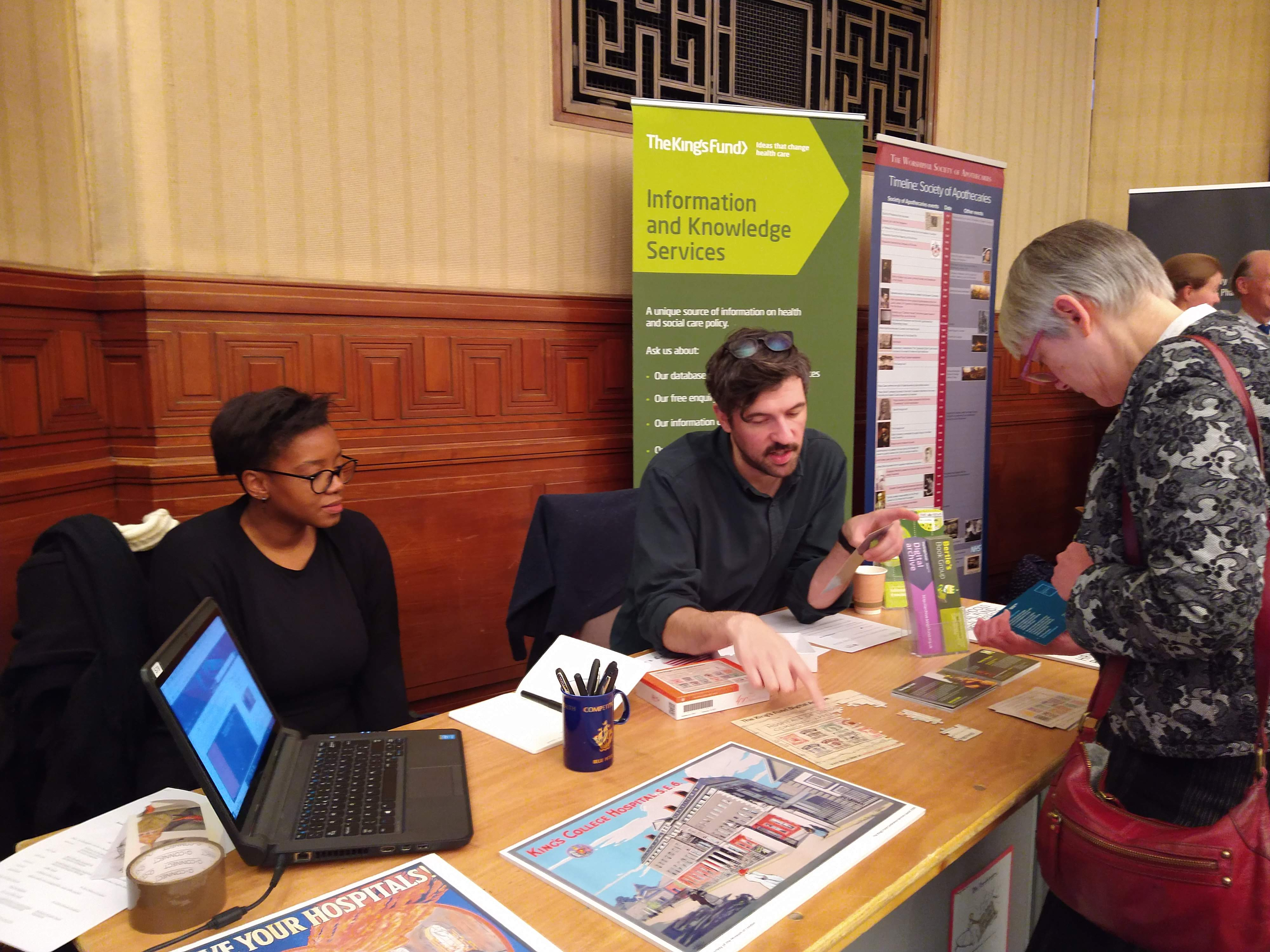
The King's Fund staff at the School of Advanced Study History Day, November 2019.

The King's Fund is a think tank, which is involved with work relating to the health and social care system in England. It produces research and analysis, offers leadership and organisational development support, and organises events.

The Chief Executive is currently Sarah Woolnough, who was previously the Chief Executive of Asthma + Lung UK. She took up the position in December 2023.

== History ==
Founded as the Prince of Wales's Hospital Fund for London in 1897, the fund changed its name in 1902 to King Edward's Hospital Fund after the accession to the throne of King Edward VII. In 1907, Parliament incorporated the fund as the King's Fund.

George Stephen, 1st Baron Mount Stephen worked closely with the future George V in building the charity's endowment fund. Lord Mount Stephen was the charity's most important benefactor, having made gifts to the amount of £1,315,000.

The fund was originally set up to contribute to London's voluntary hospitals and did so, which it later started to inspect and expand. In the early 1930s the fund built a miniature scale model of a hospital to publicise the work of voluntary hospitals and educate the public on their importance. The model with its attention to all the details of the decor, equipment and workings of a hospital toured the country. The decor included 13,000 miniature wall tiles made by W.B Simpson and Sons. which decorated the kitchen and children's ward and included nursery rhymes among the subjects.

== Think tank ==
After the NHS was created in 1948, the fund became a think tank.

In 1992 the influential King's Fund's Commission on London's Health Care identified high costs and lower throughput of central London hospitals and recommended reduction in acute services and parallel improvements in primary care.

Since 1997, they have jointly funded a yearly award system with GlaxoSmithKline. They reward small to medium-sized health charities who are improving people's health.

== See also ==
- List of UK think tanks
- Nuffield Trust
- Health Foundation
- Coproduction of public services by service users and communities
