= Healthcare in Lancashire =

Healthcare in Lancashire in 2015 was the responsibility of seven clinical commissioning groups covering Blackpool, Chorley and South Ribble, East Lancashire, Fylde and Wyre, Greater Preston, Lancaster North and West Lancashire. In 1 April 2017 32 GP practices from Cumbria Clinical Commissioning Group merged with Lancashire North CCG to form Morecambe Bay CCG which was abolished in July 2022 when integrated care systems were introduced.

== History ==
From 1947 to 1974 NHS services in Lancashire (Including Manchester but not Liverpool) were managed by the Manchester Regional Hospital Board. In 1974 the boards were abolished and replaced by regional health authorities. Lancashire and Manchester came under the North Western RHA. Regions were reorganised in 1996 and Lancashire came under the North West Regional Health Authority. Lancashire from 1974 had seven district health authorities, for Blackburn, Hyndburn and Ribble Valley, Blackpool, Wyre and Fylde, Burnley, Pendle and Rossendale, Chorley and South Ribble, Lancaster, Preston, and West Lancashire. In 1994 four new district health authorities were established covering East Lancashire, North West Lancashire, South Lancashire and Morecambe Bay District (which extended into Cumbria). Nine primary care trusts were established covering the whole of the county in 2002: Blackburn with Darwen, Blackpool, Chorley and South Ribble, Preston, West Lancashire, East Lancashire Teaching, Fylde, Wyre, and half of Morecambe Bay. In 2006 they were reduced by mergers to five. They were managed by the Cumbria and Lancashire Strategic Health Authority until 2006 and then by the North West SHA from 2002 until 2013.

The clinical commissioning groups took on the responsibilities of the former PCTs on 1 April 2013 and were replaced in July 2022.

== Sustainability and transformation plans ==
Lancashire and South Cumbria formed a sustainability and transformation plan area in March 2016 with Amanda Doyle OBE the Chief Clinical Officer of Blackpool CCG as its leader.

The plan for the county proposed to eliminate the projected 2020/21 deficit of £572 million by developing new models of delivery for vascular, cancer, maternity, neonatology, paediatrics, critical care, end-of-life care, and orthopaedics. It proposed to increase primary and community services by 20%. The hospital consolidation plan needed an investment of £95 million with a further £65 million for community premises to be built or adapted.

In February 2018 it was reported that the Better Together project in Morecambe Bay had seen a 7.8% reduction in the emergency admissions rate in the area between 2014–15 and the 12 months to September 2017.

== Commissioning ==
The clinical commissioning groups and local authorities established an organisation called Healthier Lancashire in November 2015 to build a case for "radical" system changes in the county, which faced an annual funding shortfall of £804 million a year by 2020 - 23% of the total forecast funding for health and adult social care.

== Primary and community care ==
There are General Practices throughout the county. The average payment per weighted patient in the county after adjustments for age/deprivation – is £116.69, per year compared to £136.01 nationally.

Out-of-hours services are provided by East Lancashire Medical Services Limited, OWLS CIC Ltd (West Lancashire), Chorley Medics and Bay Urgent Care. Virgin Care won a five-year contract for services previously provided by Southport and Ormskirk Hospital NHS Trust in West Lancashire in 2016.

Community care was provided by Lancashire Care NHS Foundation Trust and Spiral Health CIC. The Fylde Coast Multispecialty community provider has reduced A&E visits from people over 60 with long term conditions by 13%, and emergency admissions by 25%. In December 2018 Lancashire County Council awarded a five-year contract, worth £20.8 million a year, for the Healthy Child Programme to Virgin Care. Lancashire Care NHS Foundation Trust and Blackpool Teaching Hospitals NHS Foundation Trust challenged the decision in the High Court and the implementation of the contract was stayed pending a full hearing. The judge described the council's evidence as 'muddled' and noted that the difference between Virgin's bid and the NHS bid was only 0.07% and stressed the detrimental impact that losing the council contract would have on the trusts’ ability to provide other services.

Hospice care is provided by East Lancashire Hospice, Rossendale Hospice, St Catherine's Hospice, Pendleside Hospice and Derian House Children's Hospice.

Lancashire County Council decided in September 2020 to develop “more affordable rented extra care for older people and supported housing apartments for younger adults with disabilities”, as part of its Housing with Care and Support Strategy. This is intended to reduce "reliance on long-term residential care placements”.

== Hospital and acute care ==
Acute care is provided principally by Blackpool Teaching Hospitals NHS Foundation Trust, East Lancashire Hospitals NHS Trust, Southport and Ormskirk Hospital NHS Trust, Lancashire Teaching Hospitals NHS Foundation Trust and University Hospitals of Morecambe Bay NHS Foundation Trust. According to a study by the Carnall Farrar consultancy in 2020 rates of delayed discharges and stranded patients in hospitals in the region were among the highest in England. They recommended substantial investment in intermediate care targeted mainly at frail and elderly patients who could be discharged with suitable support.

A provider collaborative was established in 2021, chaired by Kevin McGee, chief executive of Lancashire Teaching Hospitals NHS Foundation Trust.

== Mental health ==
The biggest provider is Lancashire and South Cumbria NHS Foundation Trust. There are currently twelve beds for children diagnosed with mental health issues in Lancashire, The Cove at Heysham Morecombe is the only inpatient establishment in Lancashire, the Children and Adolescent Mental Health Service (CAHMS) opened in 2018 and replaced both The Platform and The Junction. 87 children were sent outside the county for treatment in 2019, some as far as Edinburgh, mostly because there were not enough beds available. It is planned to provide 56 more beds in 2017. The Chief Constable of Lancashire, Andy Rhodes, complained in November 2018 that the police were “picking up the pieces of a system that is falling apart”. 20,000 of 70,000 police response hours each month were devoted to mental health problems, with officers standing next to patients' beds for days when they are sectioned because there are generally no mental health beds available.

== Healthwatch ==
Healthwatch was set up under the Health and Social Care Act 2012 to act as a voice for patients. There is a Healthwatch for each borough.

== See also ==
- Category:Health in Lancashire
- Healthcare in the United Kingdom
