= Everlight Radiology =

Radiology service company

Everlight Radiology is a 24-hour provider of teleradiology services based in London and Australia.

== History ==
Everlight Radiology's chief executive is Alexander van der Laan.

It was acquired by Teleradiology International, controlled by Intermediate Capital Group, in 2016.

The South Australian Government employed it to report on images at Lyell McEwin Hospital in 2016.

It ran Radiology Reporting Online which secured part of a £3.8 million contract from NHS Scotland in 2017/8. It won a contract for reporting at Mid Essex Hospital Services NHS Trust, Basildon and Thurrock University Hospitals NHS Foundation Trust and Southend University Hospital NHS Foundation Trust in April 2018.

In 2021, it was reported as supporting 250 client sites across Australia, the UK, New Zealand, and the Republic of Ireland with a global network of about 500 radiologists and more than 300 support staff. It has regional bases in London, Leicester, Doncaster, Penzance and Belfast.

In 2021, London-based private equity firm Livingbridge acquired Everlight.

== Recognition ==
Everbright was awarded the Diagnostic Provider of the Year award at the 2024 HealthInvestor Awards.
