= Chelmsford and Essex Hospital =

Chelmsford and Essex Health Centre
- Mid Essex Hospital Services NHS Trust
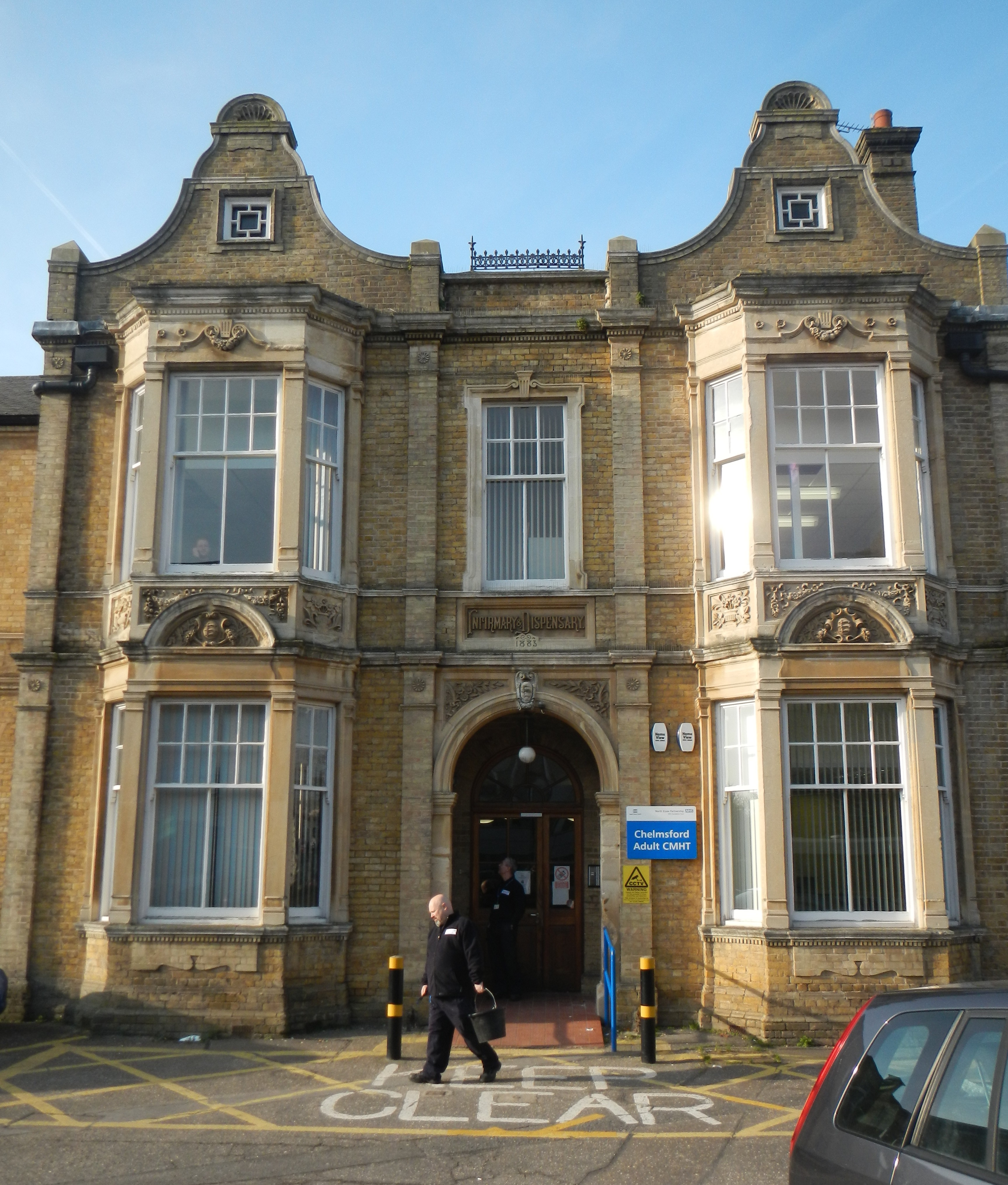
- Chelmsford and Essex Hospital

- Shown in Essex

Geography
- Location: New London Road, Chelmsford, Essex, England
- Coordinates: 51.7185°N 0.4587°E

Organisation
- Care system: NHS
- Type: General

History
- Founded: 1818
- Closed: c.2004

Chelmsford and Essex Health Centre, formerly Chelmsford and Essex Hospital, is a health facility in New London Road, Chelmsford, Essex. It is managed by Mid Essex Hospital Services NHS Trust.

== History ==
The facility has it origins in a dispensary in Duke Street which opened in 1818. It moved to a rented building in Moulsham Street in 1871 and then to a purpose-built facility in New London Road, designed by Fred Chancellor and opened by Daisy Greville, Countess of Warwick, in 1883. It joined the National Health Service as Chelmsford and Essex Hospital in 1948. After services transferred to Broomfield Hospital, the main building was downgraded to the status of a health centre and the rest of the site was subsequently redeveloped for residential use.
