= Mid and South Essex NHS Foundation Trust =

NHS foundation trust based in Essex, England

- Type: NHS foundation trust
- Established: 1 April 2020
- Hospitals: Basildon University Hospital; Braintree Community Hospital; Broomfield Hospital; Orsett Hospital; Southend University Hospital; St Michael's Hospital; St Peter's Hospital
- Staff: 15,661 (2021)
- Website: www.mse.nhs.uk

Mid and South Essex NHS Foundation Trust is an NHS foundation trust based in Essex, England. It runs three major hospitals across Essex, and a number of smaller community hospitals. One of the biggest NHS trusts in the country, it serves a population of 1.2 million people and has an annual revenue of over £850m.

== History ==
The trust was established on 1 April 2020 following the merger of three existing NHS trusts: Basildon and Thurrock University Hospitals NHS Foundation Trust, Mid Essex Hospital Services NHS Trust and Southend University Hospital NHS Foundation Trust.

An initial merger between the 3 trusts was first agreed in January 2018. This came after a number of proposals from the Mid and South Essex Sustainability and Transformation Partnership (STP) regarding reconfiguring services provided in the area.

In October 2018 the plan was referred by Southend-on-Sea Borough Council to the Secretary of State for Health and Social Care.

On 31 July 2019 the Secretary of State for Health and Social Care endorsed the merger and a provisional date of 1 April 2020 was agreed.

In 2022 it agreed a six-year contract with eConsult. This permits clinicians to ask referred patients a specialist list of questions, triaging them at the outpatients referral stage and permitting patients to send in information ahead of a visit and pre-book tests and appointments. This reduced the predicted waiting list clearance time from 20 years to three years while decreasing non-attendance from 40% to nearly zero.

It set up an ambulance handover unit supplied by EMS Healthcare in October 2022. It will accommodate 12 patients and cost £235,000.

== Performance ==
Digitising the trust's Bridging service with CareLineLive, a response to the COVID-19 pandemic in England, enabled 10 times as many patients to get home quickly. The service provides domiciliary care services while they wait for a care package from a local provider.

In the Acute trust league table, part of the NHS oversight framework, the trust is ranked 126 out of 134 acute trusts, and 23rd out of the 23 Large Acute Trusts.

== Hospitals ==
The trust runs three major hospitals:

- Basildon University Hospital in Basildon
- Broomfield Hospital in Chelmsford
- Southend University Hospital in Southend-on-Sea

The trust also runs community hospitals including Braintree Community Hospital and St Peter's Hospital.

== See also ==
- Healthcare in Essex
- List of NHS trusts
