= Keogh Review =

2013 British patient safety inquiry

The Keogh Review into patient safety was carried out by Professor Sir Bruce Keogh in July 2013.

This review was ordered by the Prime Minister in response to the Francis Inquiry into poor care at Mid Staffordshire Hospitals NHS Foundation Trust.

14 NHS Trusts which were persistent outliers in measures of hospital mortality were investigated:

- Basildon and Thurrock University Hospitals NHS Foundation Trust
- Blackpool Teaching Hospitals NHS Foundation Trust
- Buckinghamshire Healthcare NHS Trust
- Burton Hospitals NHS Foundation Trust
- Colchester Hospital University NHS Foundation Trust
- The Dudley Group NHS Foundation Trust
- East Lancashire Hospitals NHS Trust
- George Eliot Hospital NHS Trust
- Medway NHS Foundation Trust
- North Cumbria University Hospitals NHS Trust
- Northern Lincolnshire and Goole Hospitals NHS Foundation Trust
- Sherwood Forest Hospitals NHS Foundation Trust
- Tameside Hospital NHS Foundation Trust
- United Lincolnshire Hospitals NHS Trust

As a result of the review six NHS Foundation Trusts were put into special measures by Monitor and five by the NHS Trust Development Authority. Blackpool Teaching Hospitals NHS Foundation Trust, Colchester Hospital University NHS Foundation Trust and The Dudley Group NHS Foundation Trust were not put in special measures.
