= Community safety accreditation scheme =

CSAS logo

Community safety accreditation schemes enable the chief constable of a police force in the United Kingdom (except Scotland) to grant a limited range of police powers to employees of non-police organisations bolstering community safety. Community safety accreditation schemes were created under section 40 of the Police Reform Act 2002. Individuals who have been granted these powers are known under the Act as accredited persons.

== Powers ==
A chief constable may grant some or all of the following powers to an accredited person as part of a community safety accreditation scheme:

- The power to:
  - require the name and address of a person who has committed a criminal offence that causes injury, alarm and distress to another person or damage or loss of someone else's property, or to whom a penalty notice has been issued;
  - require the name and address of a person acting in an anti-social manner;
  - require a person to stop drinking in a designated public place and confiscate and dispose of alcohol being consumed in a designated place;
  - confiscate alcohol from young people;
  - confiscate cigarettes and tobacco products from young people;
  - require the removal of abandoned vehicles;
  - stop cyclists on suspicion of riding on a footpath;
  - stop a vehicle for the purposes of an inspection;
  - control traffic for the purpose of escorting abnormal loads, for the purpose of conducting a traffic survey, and for other purposes
- The power to issue a fixed penalty notice:
  - for riding a bicycle on footpath;
  - for dog fouling;
  - for littering;
  - for graffiti and fly posting;
- The power to issue a penalty notice for disorder for:
  - the sale of alcohol to person aged under 18;
  - buying or attempting to buy alcohol for consumption by a person aged under 18;
  - consumption of alcohol by a person aged under 18 or allowing such consumption;
  - delivery of alcohol to a person aged under 18 or allowing such delivery;
  - possession by a person aged under 18 of an adult firework;
  - wasting police time or giving a false report;
  - behaviour likely to cause harassment, alarm or distress;

The powers available to individuals accredited under a community safety accreditation scheme are similar to those of a police community support officer (PCSO), although PCSOs are designated with powers by the chief constable, as opposed to being accredited with them as non-employees.

The Act also makes it a criminal offence to assault, resist or obstruct an accredited person in the execution of their duty, or impersonate an accredited person.

== Requirements for accreditation ==
A person accredited under a community safety accreditation scheme has to be assessed as suitable to exercise the powers, trained by an Association of Chief Police Officers (ACPO) approved provider in their use, and vetted to a national standard. The Act also requires that the organisation employing an accredited person must be 'fit and proper' and that they must have a satisfactory complaints procedure in place.

An accredited person remains under the control of their normal employer, and is not managed or tasked by the police force. Some accredited persons are tasked by their respective police force to conduct patrols, attend incidents and gather intel, such as the community protection officers of Nottingham City Council who work with Nottinghamshire Police. These officers carry police Airwave radios and are dispatched to incidents by the force control room.

Accredited Persons must wear a uniform approved by the police when exercising their powers, and carry an ID card which also shows the powers they are authorised to use. Some forces print the powers on the back of the ID card, while others give the employees a separate powers card specifically for this.

== Examples ==
Common examples of employees granted powers under a community safety accreditation scheme include security guards, community, parish, park and dog wardens, trading standards officers, and housing association staff.

In the Avon and Somerset Constabulary area, examples of Schemes include:

- Security guards employed by MacLellan International Ltd at The Mall Shopping Centre at Cribbs Causeway near Bristol.

In the Devon and Cornwall Police area:

- Community wardens working for Teignbridge District Council.

In the Essex Police area, employees of a number of organisations have been accredited:

- Southend Hospital
- Basildon University Hospital
- Braintree District Council
- Basildon District Council Anti Social Behaviour Wardens
- Maldon District Council
- Colchester Borough Council
- Chelmer Housing
- Royals Shopping Centre
- Southend on sea borough council

In the South Yorkshire Police area, employees of a number of organisations have been accredited:

- Doncaster Metropolitan Borough Council
- Rotherham Metropolitan Borough Council
- Barnsley Metropolitan Borough Council
- Meadowhall Shopping Centre Security
- Kingdom Environmental Protections Services providing Environmental Health enforcement on behalf of Barnsley MDC

In the Nottinghamshire Police area:

- Nottingham City Council Community Protection Officers who work alongside Nottinghamshire Police

== Statistics ==
An audit published by the Home Office in August 2008 showed that 21 out of 42 police forces had granted Accredited Person status to a total of 1,406 people in 95 organisations. Nineteen of the employing organisations were private companies. Essex Police had accredited the most people—291 individuals in 25 organisations.

The powers which had been granted most widely (by more than 20 forces) were the power to seize alcohol from a person aged under 18 in a designated place, the power to seize tobacco from a person under 16, and the power to require the name and address of a person acting in an anti-social manner.
