= Monitor (NHS) =

non-departmental public body overview
- Formed: 5 January 2004
- Dissolved: 30 June 2022
- Superseding non-departmental public body: NHS England
- Jurisdiction: England
- Headquarters: Wellington House, 133-155 Waterloo Road, London
- Motto: Making the health sector work for patients
- non-departmental public body executive: Ian Dalton, Chief executive
- Parent department: NHS Improvement
- Website: www.monitor.gov.uk

Monitor was an executive non-departmental public body of the Department of Health, responsible between 2004 and 2016 for ensuring healthcare provision in NHS England was financially effective. It was the sector regulator for health services in England. Its chief executive was Ian Dalton and it was chaired by Dido Harding. Monitor was merged with the NHS Trust Development Authority to form NHS Improvement on 1 April 2016.

== History ==
The body was established on 5 January 2004 under the Health and Social Care (Community Health and Standards) Act 2003, and was formally called The Independent Regulator for Foundation Trusts. The legislation made it responsible for authorising, monitoring and regulating NHS foundation trusts. It took on the brand name Monitor from August 2004

The Health and Social Care Act 2012 formally changed the organisation's name to Monitor and gave it additional duties.

In addition to assessing NHS trusts for foundation trust status and ensuring that foundation trusts are well led, in terms of quality and finances, Monitor had a duty to:

- set prices for NHS-funded care in partnership with NHS England;
- enable integrated care;
- safeguard patient choice and prevent anti-competitive behaviour which is against the interests of patients; and
- support commissioners to protect essential health care services for patients if a provider gets into financial difficulties.

Monitor's main tool for carrying out these functions was the NHS provider licence, which contains obligations for providers of NHS services. The 2012 Act requires everyone who provides an NHS health care service to hold a licence unless they are exempt under regulations made by the Department of Health. Foundation trusts were licensed from 1 April 2013, and all other non-exempt providers were required to apply for a licence from April 2014.

It was announced in June 2015 that the chief executive posts at Monitor and the NHS Trust Development Authority were to be merged, although there would not be a complete merger of the organisations. In April 2016 both organisations became part of NHS Improvement which subsequently operationally merged with NHS England from September 2018 and was formally abolished by the Health and Care Act 2022.

== Criticism ==
In July 2014, Monitor was criticised by the Public Accounts Committee of the House of Commons (PAC) for the lack of clinical expertise and frontline NHS experience amongst its staff. The PAC noted that: "Only 21 of Monitor's 337 staff have an NHS operational background and only 7 have a clinical background, which damages Monitor's credibility in dealing with trusts and its effectiveness in diagnosing problems and developing solutions". The PAC also criticised the proportion of Monitor's budget spent on external consultants (£9 million of Monitor's £48 million budget in 2013-14) and found that "some NHS foundation trusts had been allowed to struggle for far too long in breach of their regulatory conditions. It has taken Monitor too long to help trusts in difficulty to improve, with three trusts having been in breach of their regulatory conditions since 2009". At the time of the PAC's hearing, of 147 foundation trusts 39(26%) were expected to be in deficit by the end of 2013-14 and on 31 December 2013 25 (17%) were in breach of the conditions attached to their status. The PAC also noted: "It is wholly inappropriate that the same person acted as both Chair and Chief Executive of Monitor between March 2011 and January 2014. This was contrary to corporate governance good practice and Monitor's own guidance to NHS foundation trusts". The board of MONITOR has a majority representation from former or seconded employees of KPMG, PWC and Deloitte while still awarding contracts to these organisations worth millions of pounds.

== Regulatory action ==
In July 2013 six NHS foundation trusts were placed in special measures as a result of the Keogh Review of patient safety:

- Basildon and Thurrock University Hospitals NHS Foundation Trust
- Burton Hospitals NHS Foundation Trust
- Medway NHS Foundation Trust
- Northern Lincolnshire and Goole Hospitals NHS Foundation Trust
- Sherwood Forest Hospitals NHS Foundation Trust
- Tameside Hospital NHS Foundation Trust

Subsequent trusts placed in special measures:

- The Queen Elizabeth Hospital King's Lynn NHS Foundation Trust October 2013
- East Kent Hospitals University NHS Foundation Trust August 2014

Enforcement action has been taken on 21 occasions in the first 10 months of 2013/4, compared to just nine instances in the whole of 2012-13. Monitor's former chief executive David Bennett admitted the regulator's "arm's length" distance from foundation trusts had become "a little shorter" as it intervened more readily and that increased monitoring and intervention was explained by "a declined appetite for risk" among "Parliament, the government and the public".

Details of the regulatory action Monitor has taken at NHS foundation trusts are available on its website: http://www.monitor.gov.uk/about-your-local-nhs-foundation-trust/regulatory-action/nhs-foundation-trusts-special-measures-or-un.

In August 2015 Monitor issued a letter to all Foundation Trusts telling them to fill vacancies "only where essential" and warning that current financial plans are "quite simply unaffordable" as NHS providers collectively forecast a deficit of £2bn in 2015-16.

== Stafford Hospital investigation ==
In 2010 the Stafford Hospital scandal investigation recommended that Monitor de-authorise the Mid Staffordshire NHS Foundation Trust.

In line with the investigation report recommendation, Secretary of State for Health, Andy Burnham, agreed to a further Independent Inquiry of the commissioning, supervisory and regulatory bodies for Foundation Trusts.

== Anti-competitive behaviour ==
Spire Healthcare alleged in 2013 that a block contract agreed between Blackpool Teaching Hospitals NHS Foundation Trust and the clinical commissioning groups in Blackpool, and Fylde and Wyre offered a "clear incentive" for GPs to refer patients to the foundation trust and that this was anti-competitive behaviour. The contract provided the trust with a guaranteed income regardless of the number of patients that chose to use its services. Monitor conducted an investigation and decided In September 2014 that there was no evidence to support the claim though they did conclude that Blackpool CCG's plans did not "go far enough" to ensure patients would be offered choice, or that the right to choice would be "publicised and promoted". Blackpool CCG complained that not a single GP, practice manager or patient was spoken to by the investigating team, nor was a single practice visited.

In September 2014 former chief executive David Bennett admitted that the organisation had yet to identify a strategy to counter those opposed to competition because it clashed with their personal ideologies. He claimed organisations were using competition regulations as an "easy excuse" for avoiding making necessary changes.

In October 2014 after the publication of NHS England's 'Five year forward view' Bennett defended Choice and competition as "one of the ways in which we can drive change and improvement for patients, and we don't see that that will cease to be the case" - though competition was not mentioned by NHS England. He also said that Monitor, the NHS Trust Development Authority and NHS England planned to develop "a whole system, geographically based intervention regime" which could, include a 'special measures' approach to areas facing serious problems with care.
