= Mansel Aylward =

British health scientist (1942–2024)

Sir Mansel Aylward CB FLSW (November 1942 – 29 May 2024) was a Welsh public health physician and academic. He was Chief Medical Officer, Medical Director and Chief Scientist at the U.K. Government Department for Work and Pensions.

Aylward was Director of the Centre for Psychosocial Research, Occupational and Physician Health at Cardiff University School of Medicine. He was appointed Companion of the Order of the Bath (CB) in the 2002 Birthday Honours and knighted in the 2010 New Year Honours, for services to healthcare. He was made a Freeman of the Borough of Merthyr Tydfil in 2013 and elected to the fellowship of the Learned Society of Wales in 2016.

From 2009 to 2017, he was the first Chair of Public Health Wales NHS Trust, responsible for the delivery of public health services at national, local and community levels in Wales. He was later the Chair (Emeritus) of the Bevan Commission, a group of international experts which advises the Welsh Minister for Health and Social Services.

== Background ==
Aylward was born in the Ex-servicemen's Club in Merthyr Tydfil in November 1942. He died on 29 May 2024, at the age of 81.

== Career ==
From 1996 to April 2005, Aylward was Chief Medical Adviser, Medical Director and Chief Scientist of the UK Department for Work and Pensions and Chief Medical Adviser and Head of Profession at the Veteran's Agency, Ministry of Defence. He was on the board of the Benefits Agency Medical Service in the 1990s.

Aylward's wife, Angela, was then involved in setting up a company called Mediprobe, trading under the name Nationwide Medical Examination Advisory Service Ltd, which arranged for the agency's doctors to work for insurance companies.

Aylward was involved in the establishment of the new Work Capability Assessment test. When he left the department he headed the UnumProvident Centre for Psychosocial and Disability Research, at Cardiff University.

Aylward was criticised for what was a biomedical model of psychosocial worklessness; although he called it a biopsychosocial model, it was clearly distinct from any such model. Qualified only as a physician, his lack of any professional qualifications as a scientist was problematic to an academic career in applied science, in addition to the financial influence of UNUM, an American insurance-company of poor reputation for illegal withholding of disability-insurance payments and which funded his academic unit. His model was said to be the basis of the Cameron government’s disability benefits crackdown and the intensification of a hostile environment towards disabled people.

Aylward was Chair of the advisory board of HCB Group, a provider of rehabilitation and case management services to insurance companies and the corporate sector.

Aylward was also Chair of Life Sciences Hub Wales from 2017 to 2021. He remained on the Board of Directors.

== Publications ==
- Managing long-term worklessness in primary care: a focus group study, Cohen D, Marfell N, Webb K, Robling M, Aylward M, Occup Med (Lond), Volume 60, 2 (March 2010) pp. 121–126
- Models of Sickness and Disability Applied to Common Health Problems, Waddell G et al., Royal Society of Medicine Press (2010)
- The Power of Belief: psychosocial influences on illness, disability and medicine, Edited by Halligan P W and Aylward M
- Beliefs: Clinical and vocational interventions; tackling psychological and social determinants of illness and disability, Edited by Halligan PW and Aylward M Oxford University Press (2006)
- The Scientific and Conceptual Basis of Incapacity Benefits, Gordon Waddell and Mansel Aylward, The Stationery Office 2005
