= Southend University Hospital NHS Foundation Trust =

NHS hospital trust

- Type: NHS foundation trust
- Established: 17 December 1990
- Disbanded: 1 April 2020
- Hospitals: Southend University Hospital
- Staff: 3,997 (2019/20)
- Website: www.southend.nhs.uk

Southend University Hospital NHS Foundation Trust was an NHS foundation trust which ran Southend University Hospital. It merged with two other trusts to form Mid and South Essex NHS Foundation Trust on 1 April 2020.

== History ==
The trust was established as the Southend Health Care Services NHS Trust on 17 December 1990, and became operational on 1 April 1991. It changed its name to the Southend Hospital NHS Trust on 19 December 1997, and became a foundation trust in 2006.

A joint pathology venture with Basildon and Thurrock University Hospitals NHS Foundation Trust and Integrated Pathology Partnerships was set up in August 2014. A new laboratory will be built at Dobson House, in Bentalls, Basildon.

The Chief Executive Officer of the hospital from April 2015 until January 2017 was Sue Hardy. Hardy resigned in January 2017 to "pursue other opportunities as the trust moves into a new era". The medical director is Neil Rothnie and the Chairman of Consultant Staff Committee is Sohail Ansari.

A merger with Basildon and Thurrock University Hospitals NHS Foundation Trust and Mid Essex Hospital Services NHS Trust was proposed in January 2018. On 31 July 2019 the Secretary of State for Health and Social Care endorsed the merger and a provisional date of 1 April 2020 was agreed.

== Performance ==
In June 2014, the Trust was described as having "one of the worst performing accident and emergency departments in the country", which "repeatedly failed to consistently meet the national target of seeing most A&E patients within four hours, and ensure most wait less than 18 weeks for operations" by Monitor.

== See also ==
- Healthcare in Essex
- List of NHS trusts
