= EMS Healthcare =

English company

EMS Healthcare is an English supplier of mobile healthcare and community research sites.

== History ==
=== 2000 ===
EMS was founded in October 2000 by Keith Austin and Iain Johnston.

=== 2007 - 2020 ===
The business began developing innovations to support the evolving needs of the healthcare landscape.

In 2017, EMS Healthcare launched the UK's first mobile decontamination unit in collaboration with Cantel UK. A mobile decontamination unit was deployed at University Hospitals of Leicester NHS Trust in 2019 to maintain services during construction of a permanent facility.

In 2014, a mobile macular unit was deployed to Frimley Health NHS Foundation Trust to provide treatment services in local supermarkets.

=== 2021: NHS-Galleri trial ===
In 2021, the business began supporting the NHS-Galleri trial, a project aimed at detecting early-stage cancers through the Galleri blood test. They provided mobile research units and clinical staffing for the trial.

=== 2022 ===
The business provided a mobile respiratory unit to Respiratory Innovation Wales in 2022. It ran in collaboration with Hywel Dda University Health Board, Cwm Taf Morgannwg University Health Board, and Life Sciences Hub Wales.

Mid and South Essex NHS Foundation Trust set up an ambulance handover unit supplied by the company in October 2022.

=== 2023 - present ===
In May 2023, the business worked with Greater Manchester Cancer Alliance on a prostate cancer campaign. It provided a mobile clinic to offer PSA blood tests and talk to men about their risk of prostate cancer.

EMS Healthcare entered a 5-year contract with Royal Surrey NHS Foundation Trust in collaboration with LloydsPharmacy ClinicalHomecare, to provide a mobile treatment suite for chemotherapy and immunotherapy.

The business supplied a mobile clinic to Locala Health and Wellbeing in late 2023 to provide sexual health, vaccinations and GP services in Greater Manchester and West Yorkshire.

A mobile research unit was provided to NIHR CRN North West Coast by the business in October 2023.

In February 2024, Dr. Clare Grace was appointed as the CEO of EMS Healthcare. Founder Keith Austin remains on the company board of directors.

A temporary mobile endoscopy unit was deployed by the company to University of Midlands NHS Foundation Trust in September 2024.

== Awards ==
Cheshire and Wirral Partnership NHS Foundation Trust project received a high commendation at the HSJ Partnership Awards 2023 for Best Estates Optimisation Project.

In November 2023, Invizius mobile laboratory supplied by EMS Healthcare won Best Collaborative Project at the Lab Awards.
