= St John's Hospital, Chelmsford =

St John's Hospital
- Mid Essex Hospital Services NHS Trust
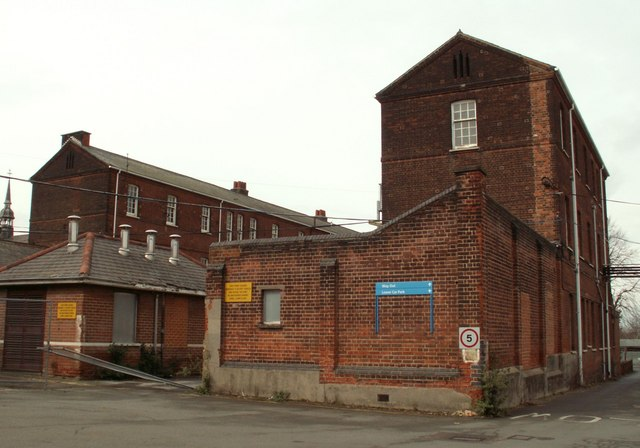
- St John's Hospital

- Shown in Essex

Geography
- Location: Wood Street, Chelmsford, Essex, England
- Coordinates: 51.7185°N 0.4587°E

Organisation
- Care system: NHS
- Type: General

History
- Founded: 1837
- Closed: 2010

St John's Hospital was a health facility in Wood Street, Chelmsford, Essex. It was managed by Mid Essex Hospital Services NHS Trust.

== History ==
The facility has it origins in the Chelmsford Union Workhouse, which was designed by William Thorold and completed in 1837. After a fire in 1886, it was replaced by a new workhouse, designed by Fred Chancellor, which was completed in 1889. The facility joined the National Health Service as St John's Hospital in 1948. After services transferred to Broomfield Hospital, St John's Hospital closed in November 2010. The buildings were subsequently demolished and the site redeveloped for residential use.
