= St Michael's Hospital, Braintree =

St Michael's Hospital
- Mid Essex Hospital Services NHS Trust
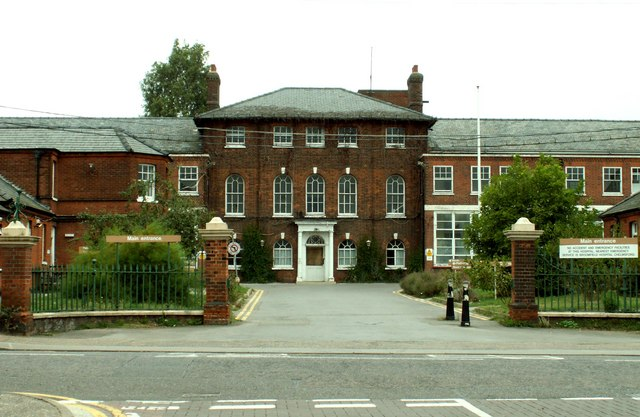
- St Michael's Hospital

- Shown in Essex

Geography
- Location: Rayne Road, Braintree, Essex, England
- Coordinates: 51.8794°N 0.5431°E

Organisation
- Care system: NHS
- Type: General

History
- Founded: 1838
- Closed: 2001

The St Michael's Hospital was a health facility in Rayne Road, Braintree, Essex. It was managed by Mid Essex Hospital Services NHS Trust.

== History ==
The facility had its origins in the Braintree Union Workhouse which was designed by William Nash and opened in 1838. New infirmary wings were added on either side of the main building in 1910. It became the Braintree Public Assistance Institution in 1930 and joined the National Health Service as St Michael's Hospital in 1948. After services transferred to the William Julien Courtauld Hospital, St Michael's Hospital closed in November 2001. The main building was converted into luxury apartments in 2008.
