= Broomfield, Essex =

Village in Essex, England

Coordinates: 51.765°N 0.471°E

Broomfield
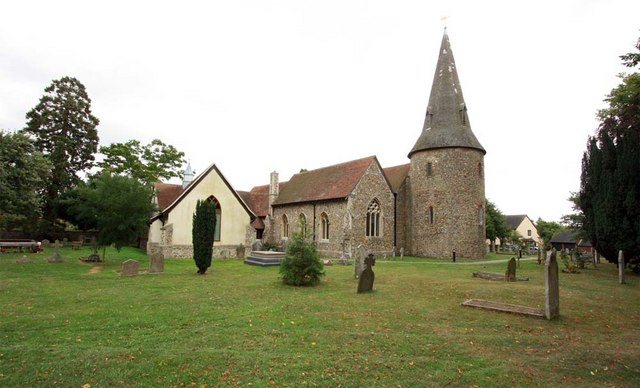
- St Mary, Broomfield

- Location within Essex
- Population: 6,756 (Parish, 2021)
- OS grid reference: TL706103
- District: Chelmsford
- Shire county: Essex
- Region: East
- Country: England
- Sovereign state: United Kingdom
- Post town: Chelmsford
- Postcode district: CM1
- Dialling code: 01245
- Police: Essex
- Fire: Essex
- Ambulance: East of England
- UK Parliament: North West Essex

Broomfield is a suburban village and civil parish in the Chelmsford district of Essex, England, lying on the northern edge of the city's built up area. It is the site of a major Accident & Emergency hospital. There are two public houses as well as primary and secondary schools and sports clubs. At the 2021 census the parish had a population of 6,756.

The village was struck by an F1/T2 tornado on 23 November 1981, as part of the record-breaking nationwide tornado outbreak on that day.

== Local amenities ==
Broomfield Hospital is one of the largest in the East of England. It is a national specialist centre for Plastics and Burns treatment. It also is a specialist clinic for the diagnosis and treatment of complex Ear, Nose and Throat cases.

There are two sports clubs - Broomfield F.C. and Broomfield Cricket Club. Broomfield Football Club was established in 1905. The club still plays on its ground in Mill Lane, Broomfield

The charity Green Zone Community Climate Action began in the village.

=== Schools ===
Broomfield Primary School is a primary school located on School Lane.

Chelmer Valley High School is a secondary school situated next to the hospital.

=== Transport ===
Several First Essex bus routes run between Broomfield and Chelmsford city centre.

== Religious sites ==
The local church is St Mary with St Leonard, on Church Green. It has a round tower, which is unusual for an Essex church. It is part of Chelmsford North Deanery. There is also a Methodist church, at 124 Main Road.

== Saxon princely tomb ==
Broomfield has an important Anglo-Saxon burial site which was discovered by workmen in 1888, after which there was a partial excavation. A more complete excavation was later made by CH Reid. Finds include weapons, gold ornaments and domestic items such as glassware, cups and buckets. The finds are now in the British Museum. The burial has been compared with Taplow and Sutton Hoo.
