= Braintree Community Hospital =

- Mid and South Essex NHS Foundation Trust
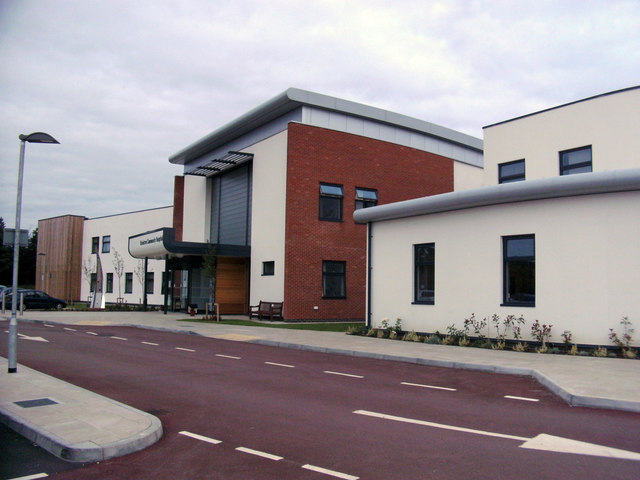

Geography
- Location: Chadwick Drive, Braintree, Essex, England
- Coordinates: 51.8798°N 0.5382°E

Organisation
- Care system: National Health Service
- Type: Community

History
- Opened: 19 April 2010

Links
- Website: www.mse.nhs.uk/other-locations-and-sites

Braintree Community Hospital is a community hospital in Braintree, Essex. It is run by Mid and South Essex NHS Foundation Trust.

== History ==
The hospital opened on 19 April 2010. It was initially managed by Braintree Clinical Services Ltd (BCSL), which was later acquired by Serco in March 2011. In August 2014 the hospital was handed over to Mid Essex Hospital Services NHS Trust, which later merged with two other trusts in April 2020 to form Mid and South Essex NHS Foundation Trust, which currently runs the hospital.

== Services ==
The hospital provides inpatient and outpatient services including day surgery and endoscopy.
