= Blackpool Victoria Hospital =

- Blackpool Teaching Hospitals NHS Foundation Trust
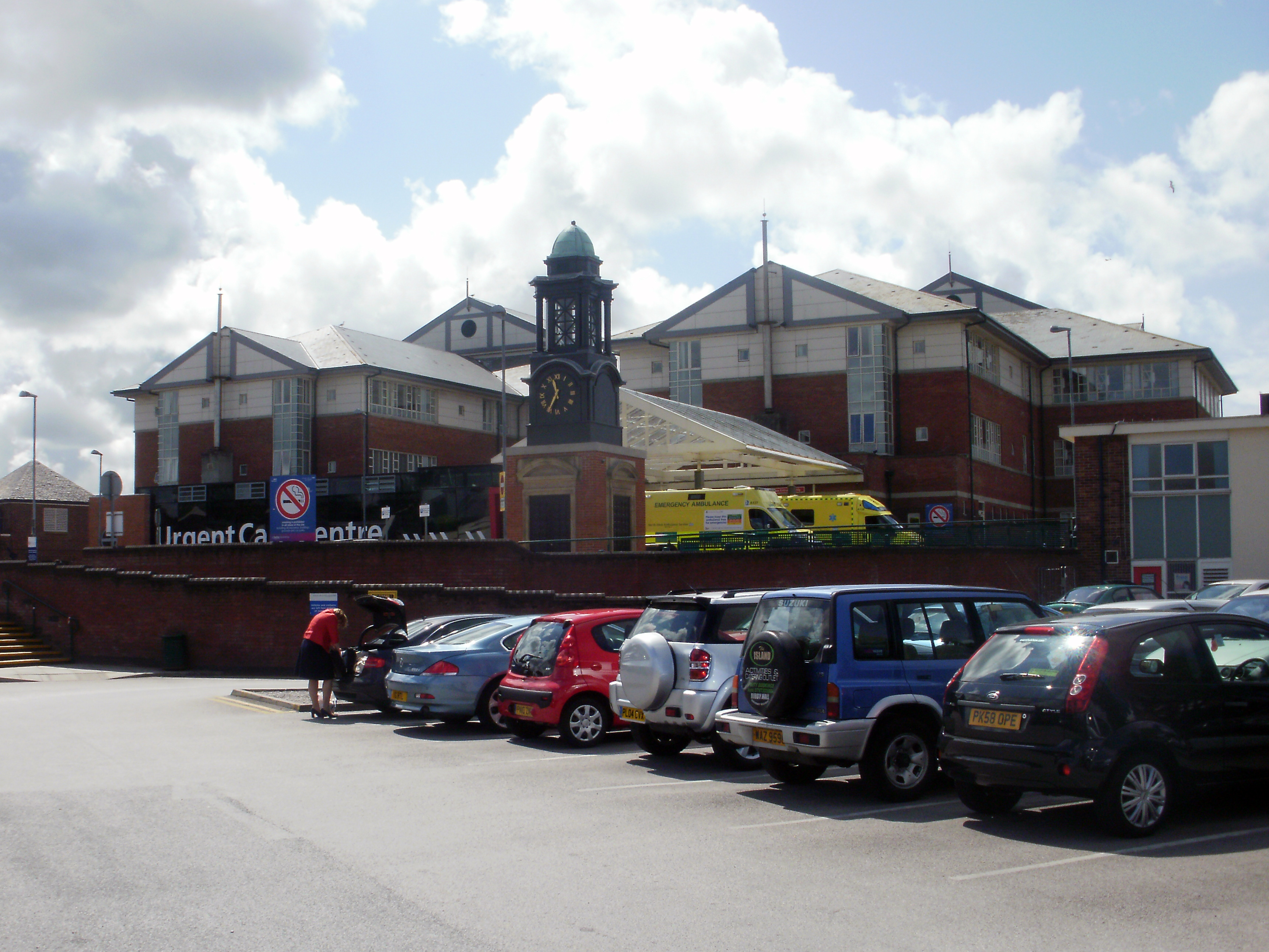
- Blackpool Victoria Hospital

Geography
- Location: Blackpool, Lancashire, England, United Kingdom
- Coordinates: 53.8216°N 3.0156°W

Organisation
- Care system: NHS / Private
- Type: District General / Pre-Trauma Centre Stabilisation
- Affiliated university: University of Liverpool

Services
- Emergency department: Yes Accident & Emergency
- Beds: 767

History
- Founded: 1894

Links
- Website: www.bfwhospitals.nhs.uk
- Lists: Hospitals in England

Blackpool Victoria Hospital, known locally as The Vic, is the main hospital for Blackpool and the Fylde Coast in Lancashire, England. It is managed by the Blackpool Teaching Hospitals NHS Foundation Trust.

== History ==
The hospital was originally located on Whitegate Lane (now Drive) and was opened as the Blackpool Hospital in 1894. The Manchester Guardian said that the hospital owed its existence and its extensive equipment to George Chadwick Kingsbury, a GP and the founder of Fylde Medical Society, who was the first Chair of the Hospital Management Board and also the Mayor of Blackpool in 1900. It became the Blackpool Victoria Hospital by consent of Queen Victoria when it was enlarged in 1898.

The foundation stone of a new building on East Park Drive was laid by the Earl of Derby on 9 June 1933. The new hospital opened there in 1936 and then joined the National Health Service in 1948.

The hospital has been shown in a major BBC One documentary, Blackpool Medics: 10 Days in May which featured the work of the hospital and the North West Ambulance Service. The second series was broadcast in January 2008.

On 25 July 2010, a nurse named Jane Clough was stabbed to death in the hospital car park. Her ex-boyfriend Jonathan Vass, an ambulance technician, was later found guilty of her murder.

On 11 September 2018, a patient tested positive for the monkeypox virus, the United Kingdom's second case.

== Services ==
The hospital departments include Accident and Emergency, the Macmillan Cancer Suite, Maternity and Gynae, a cardiac unit and intensive care. The Lancashire Cardiac Centre is situated at the hospital; the unit provides specialist cardiology and cardiothoracic surgery services for Lancashire and Cumbria.

The A&E department was already struggling to meet the four-hour target in 2019 and the COVID-19 pandemic in England led to deterioration with hundreds of 12-hour breaches each month, considerably worse than most hospitals. In 2021 it was described by the Care Quality Commission as "chaotic", with a serious lack of awareness and oversight of safety incidents by managers. In April 2022 they issued an enforcement notice due to concerns around the management of patients with sepsis. A new 'transfer of care' ward opened in April, for patients waiting to be fully discharged, and a new frailty unit is to open. A new 'same-day emergency care' unit is also planned.

== See also ==
- List of hospitals in England
