= Newark Hospital =

- Sherwood Forest Hospitals NHS Foundation Trust
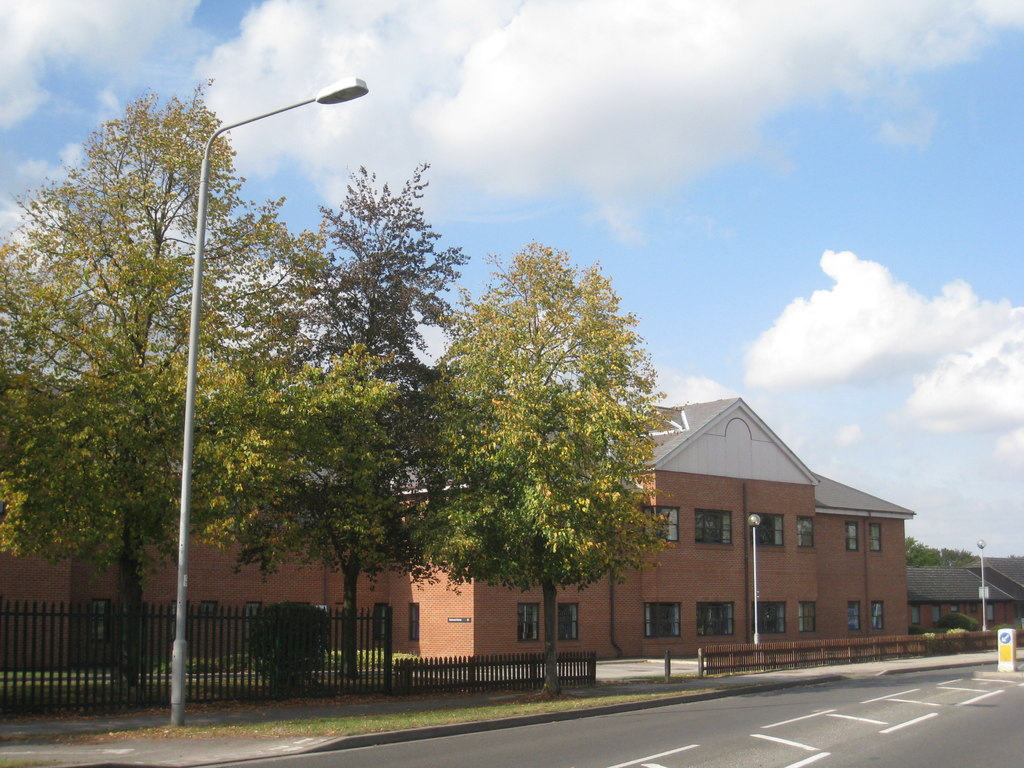
- The current Newark Hospital on Boundary Road

- Shown in Nottinghamshire

Geography
- Location: Newark-on-Trent, England, United Kingdom
- Coordinates: 53.0672°N 0.8057°W

Organisation
- Care system: Public NHS
- Type: General

Services
- Emergency department: Urgent Care Centre

History
- Founded: 1786

Links
- Lists: Hospitals in England

Newark Hospital is a health facility in Newark-on-Trent, Nottinghamshire, England. It is managed by the Sherwood Forest Hospitals NHS Foundation Trust.

== History ==
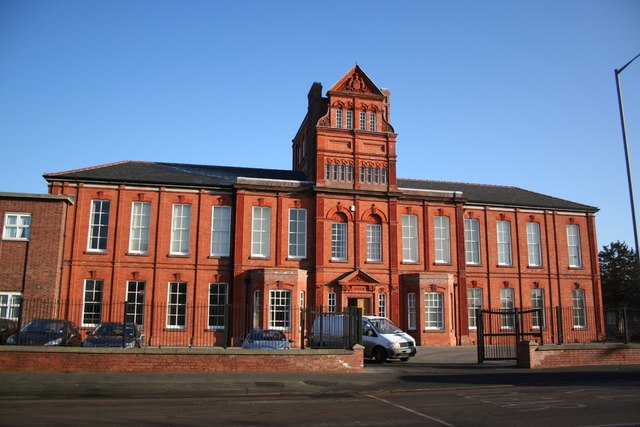
The old Newark General Hospital on London Road

The hospital has its origins in a workhouse established in Hawton Road (now Albert Street) in 1786. The workhouse infirmary, which was established in the early 19th century, merged with the local dispensary to become Newark Hospital and Dispensary in 1868.

The hospital moved to larger facilities, designed by William Bliss, on a site on London Road in April 1881. This released the old hospital site for redevelopment as the Castle Brewery. The hospital joined the National Health Service as Newark General Hospital in 1948.

The old Newark General hospital on London Road closed in 1996, after patients had been transferred to a modern healthcare facility on Boundary Road which was opened by the Duke of Gloucester in 1996.

== See also ==
- List of hospitals in England
