= Spiral Health CIC =

Community Interest Company

Spiral Health was a Community Interest Company based in Blackpool formed in 2012 by nurses from Blackpool Teaching Hospitals NHS Foundation Trust.

It ran two care homes in Bispham, Blackpool, where there are 28 beds, and Preston, where there were 64 beds, which were also used for rehabilitation and a physiotherapy at home programme. It was praised for its high levels of staff engagement. There were 121 staff.

It was said to create £17.5m worth of financial value each year. It provided 17,628 rehabilitation bed nights in 2014/5 for 1,171 patients, and is said to have saved more than £7 million in the cost of A&E attendances.

It won the title of Lancashire's Social Enterprise of the Year in November 2014.

It took over the Little Sisters of the Poor nursing home in Preston in 2017.

Spiral Health CIC ceased trading 31 January 2019
