= Stephen Powis =

National medical director for NHS England

Sir Stephen Powis
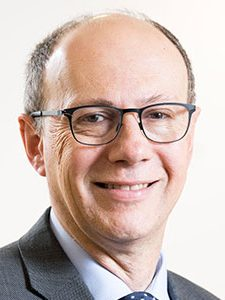

National Medical Director for NHS England
- Incumbent
- Assumed office 2018
- Preceded by: Sir Bruce Keogh

Personal details
- Education: University of Glasgow; St John's College, Oxford; University of Warwick

Sir Stephen Huw Powis is a British consultant nephrologist and a professor at University College London. He was the National Medical Director of NHS England between 2018 and 2025, and previously chief medical officer at the Royal Free London NHS Foundation Trust.

== Family and education ==
His father was a chaplain at the Christie Hospital, Manchester.

Powis studied medicine at the University of Glasgow and St John's College, Oxford between 1979 and 1985. He obtained a PhD while working at the Imperial Cancer Research Fund. He also holds an MBA from Warwick University.

== Professional career ==
Powis joined the Royal Free London NHS Foundation Trust in 1997 as a consultant, becoming the trust's medical director in 2006 and chief clinical information officer in 2016. He left the Royal Free at the end of 2017 to become medical director of NHS England, a post he took up at the beginning of 2018. In March 2025, he announced he would step down from his NHS role in the summer.

During his time at the Royal Free, Powis was involved in an arrangement for the hospital to share information with Google Deepmind. His main clinical interest is renal transplantation, and he is Professor of Renal Medicine at University College London.

He is a past non-executive director of North Middlesex University Hospital NHS Trust (including a period of eight months as acting chairman), chair of the Association of UK Hospitals medical directors' group, and chairman of the Joint Royal Colleges of Physicians Training Board speciality advisory committee for renal medicine. He sat on the board of Medical Education England.

He edited Nephron Clinical Practice from 2003 to 2008 and was inaugural editor-in-chief of the BMJ Leader from 2017.

Powis sponsored the National Medical Director's Clinical Fellow scheme, established in 2011 and run by the Faculty of Medical Leadership and Management. The scheme provides doctors in training with a unique opportunity to spend 12 months in national healthcare-affiliated organisations outside of clinical practice to develop their skills in leadership, management, strategy, project management and health policy.

During the COVID-19 pandemic, which began in the spring of 2020, he frequently spoke as part of the government's team for daily briefings. He joined the Scientific Advisory Group for Emergencies (SAGE) some time after the Covid pandemic began, and advised senior ministers within HM Government throughout the pandemic.

Following the appointment of Amanda Pritchard as NHS England chief executive in 2021 he was appointed as interim chief executive officer of NHS Improvement.

He was created a Knight Bachelor, for services to the NHS, particularly during COVID-19, in the Queen's 2022 Birthday Honours.

Powis resigned as National Medical Director for NHS England in July 2025. He was succeeded jointly by obstetrician Professor Meghana Pandit and general practitioner Dr Claire Fuller.
