= Tameside and Glossop Integrated Care NHS Foundation Trust =

NHS trust

Coordinates: 53°29′36″N 2°4′16″W

- Former name: Tameside and Glossop Acute Services NHS Trust; Tameside Hospital NHS Foundation Trust
- Established: 1 February 2008
- Headquarters: Fountain Street; Ashton-under-Lyne; OL6 9RW
- Population: 250,000
- Hospitals: Tameside General Hospital
- Chair: David Wakefield
- Chief executive: Karen James
- Staff: 3,800
- Website: www.tamesidehospital.nhs.uk

Tameside and Glossop Integrated Care NHS Foundation Trust is an integrated foundation Trust that operates from Tameside General Hospital situated in Ashton-under-Lyne. It serves the surrounding area of Tameside in Greater Manchester, and the town of Glossop and other smaller towns and villages in the north western part of the High Peak district of Derbyshire. Employing approximately 3,800 staff, the Trust provides a range of services both within the hospital and in the local community. This includes Accident and Emergency services, and full consultant-led obstetric and paediatric hospital services for women, children and babies.

== Performance ==
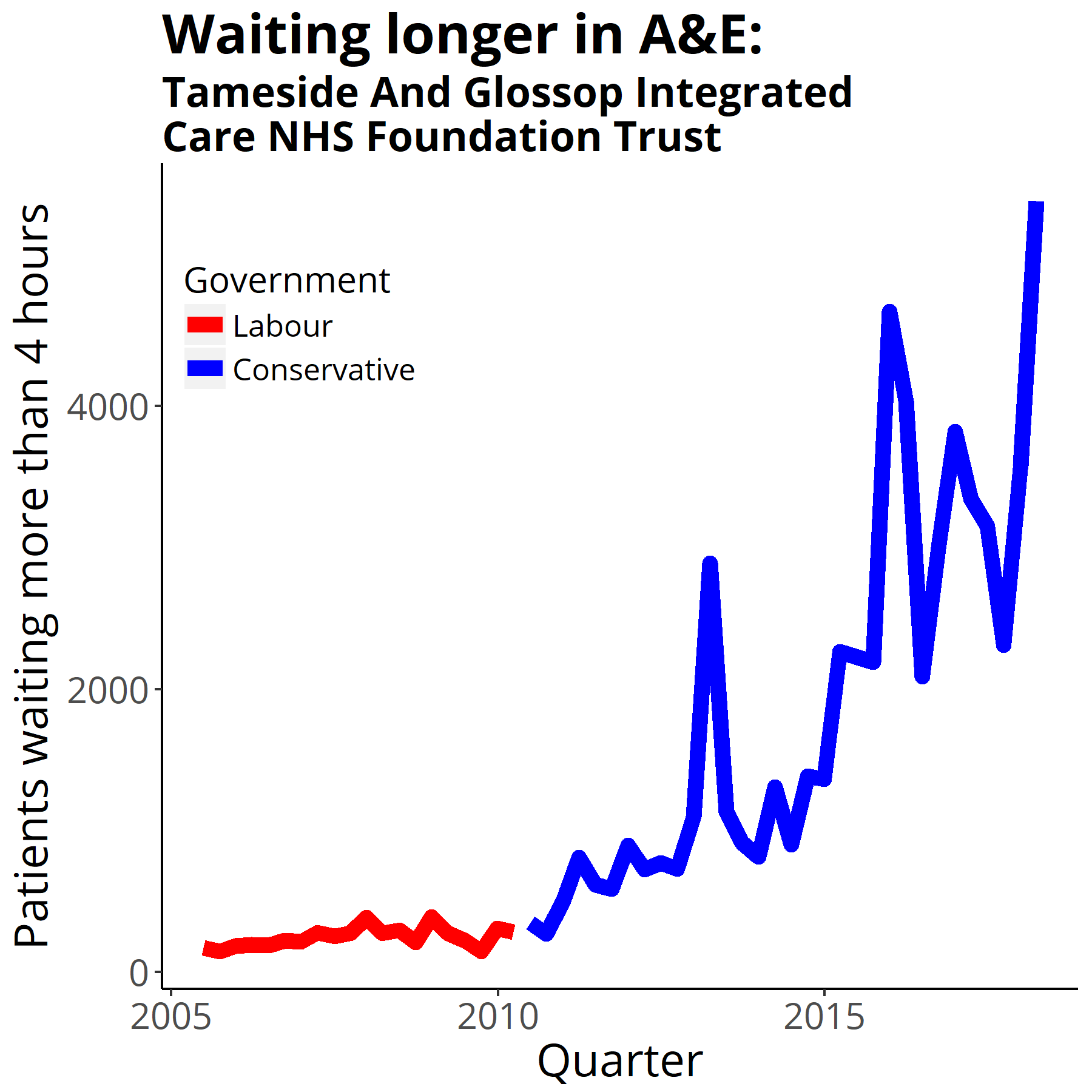
Four-hour target in the emergency department quarterly figures from NHS England Data from https://www.england.nhs.uk/statistics/statistical-work-areas/ae-waiting-times-and-activity/

In 2005 the hospital received the maximum three star rating from the Healthcare Commission in recognition of the quality of its services, and was granted Foundation Trust status on 1 February 2008. In July 2013 The Guardian newspaper disclosed the existence of two previously unpublished critical reviews commissioned by the hospital which revealed concerns about chronic under-staffing and sub-standard care. Christine Green, the chief executive, and Dr Tariq Mahmood, the hospital's medical director, both resigned as a result of the disclosure.

In July 2013 as a result of the Keogh Review the Trust was put into special measures by Monitor In October 2013 the Trust was put into the highest risk category by the Care Quality Commission. Karen James was appointed interim Chief Executive in 2013 but was appointed permanently in 2014. She was awarded an OBE in the 2020 New Year's Honours list in recognition for bringing the Trust out of special measures to be rated 'Good' by the CQC in 2017 and 2019.

Jeremy Hunt (politician) visited the hospital in June 2015 saying "I think the management of the trust has completely changed. The staff have managers who listen to them if they have concerns and I think everyone here deserves huge congratulations for the progress they have been making in turning the hospital around."

The trust was one of the beneficiaries of Boris Johnson's announcement of capital funding for the NHS in August 2019, with an allocation of £16.3 million for emergency and urgent care facilities at Tameside General Hospital.

== Local population ==
Located near the Pennines, eight miles east of Manchester, the hospital serves a population of over 250,000. The population is concentrated in the largely urban areas of the townships of Tameside (Ashton-under-Lyne, Audenshaw, Denton, Droylsden, Dukinfield, Hyde, Longdendale, Mossley and Stalybridge) which comprises Tameside Metropolitan Borough Council. Glossop, with its population of approximately 32,000 is part of Derbyshire High Peak Borough Council, which is a more rural community.

== History ==
=== Maternity ===
Two World Cup-winning footballers were born in the hospital: Geoff Hurst, to whom there is a plaque within the maternity unit, and Simone Perrotta.

=== Integrated care trust ===
In 2015 it was proposed to redesign health services in the area by bringing hospital and community care together in a programme called Care Together. It was proposed that most care will be provided outside hospital, at home or close to where people live. The trust became an integrated care organisation, employing social care staff with a capitated payment system. GPs may join the trust as salaried staff. Subspecialty services in medicine and surgery and outpatient clinics would be provided by other trusts.

To reflect the change in approach, the trust's name was changed in 2016 from Tameside Hospital NHS Foundation Trust to Tameside and Glossop Integrated Care NHS Foundation Trust. The new organisation brings together Tameside and Glossop Clinical Commissioning Group, Tameside Metropolitan Borough Council and the Foundation Trust with the borough council Chief Executive leading the organisation.

=== Healthy eating ===
From January 2018 the hospital's restaurant offers only sugar free drinks to its staff and visitors as part of a programme to help staff and patients to lose weight.

=== Commemorative plaque ===
In 2019, a commemorative plaque in nurse Charlotte Seymour Yapp's honour was unveiled at the trust.

== See also ==
- Healthcare in Greater Manchester
- List of hospitals in England
- List of NHS trusts
