= The Harbour (hospital) =

- Lancashire Care NHS Foundation Trust
- Shown in Lancashire

Geography
- Location: Windmill Rise, Blackpool, England
- Coordinates: 53.8004°N 2.9915°W

Organisation
- Care system: National Health Service
- Type: Psychiatric

Services
- Beds: 154

Helipads
- Helipad: No

History
- Founded: 2014

Links
- Website: www.lancashirecare.nhs.uk/Harbour-Wards%20Harbour
- Lists: Hospitals in England

The Harbour is a mental health hospital in Blackpool, Lancashire, England. It is managed by Lancashire Care NHS Foundation Trust. The hospital provides in-patient mental health services for Lancashire.

== History ==
The hospital was officially opened by Alastair Campbell in October 2015. Since opening it has had difficulties attracting sufficient skilled psychiatric staff.
