= St Peter's Hospital, Maldon =

St Peter's Hospital
- Mid and South Essex NHS Foundation Trust
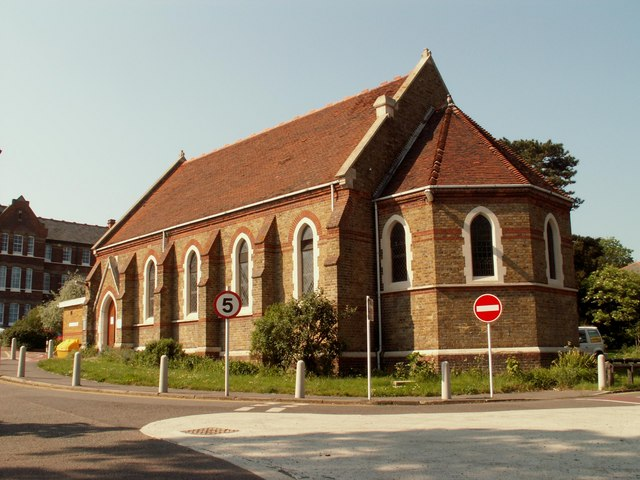
- St Peter's Hospital Chapel

- Shown in Essex

Geography
- Location: Spital Road, Maldon, Essex, England
- Coordinates: 51.7301°N 0.6716°E

Organisation
- Care system: National Health Service
- Type: Community

History
- Founded: 1873

Links
- Website: www.mse.nhs.uk/st-peters-hospital

St Peter's Hospital is a health facility in Spital Road, Maldon, Essex. It is managed by Mid and South Essex NHS Foundation Trust.

== History ==
The facility has it origins in the Maldon Union Workhouse, which was designed by Frederick Peck in the Tudor style and opened in 1873, replacing an earlier workhouse on Market Hill. The Maldon Union Workhouse was known locally as 'the Spike', and had an ominous reputation.

The workhouse became the Maldon Institution in 1930 and joined the National Health Service as St Peter's Hospital in 1948. In 2003 the building was considered for listed status, but did not meet the criteria.

The age of the hospital building has led to problems in the 21st century. Hallways are narrow, and in 2024 Mid and South Essex Integrated Care Board deemed parts of the building "no longer safe for patients to stay in or staff to work in" and estimated that £18.7 million in repairs were needed to fix problems including roof leaks that have caused cracks in walls. Improvement works were carried out in November 2018. Weight restrictions were introduced on the first and second floors, and the number of stroke rehabilitation beds was reduced as a result. In 2023, the stroke rehabilitation unit was moved temporarily to Brentwood Community Hospital in Brentwood and the labour and delivery unit was moved to Braintree Community Hospital in Braintree.

In January 2024, the trust proposed closing St Peter's and relocating some services to sites elsewhere in Maldon. This prompted local protests, including a naked protest, and in September 2024 the plans were shelved. In July 2025 an alternative proposal was announced, under which the birthing and stroke rehabilitation units would be closed, while other services would continue until the opening of a new medical hub in 2030.
