= William Julien Courtauld Hospital =

- Mid Essex Hospital Services NHS Trust
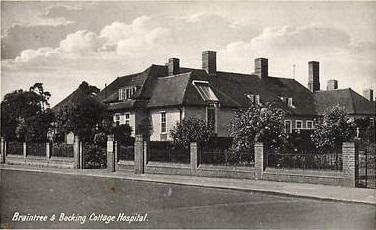
- Braintree and Bocking Cottage Hospital

- Shown in Essex

Geography
- Location: London Road, Braintree, Essex, England
- Coordinates: 51.8748°N 0.5435°E

Organisation
- Care system: NHS
- Type: General

History
- Founded: 1871
- Closed: 2010

The William Julien Courtauld Hospital was a health facility in London Road, Braintree, Essex. It was managed by Mid Essex Hospital Services NHS Trust.

== History ==
The facility was founded by Mrs George Courtauld and opened in Halstead Road in Bocking as the Braintree and Bocking Cottage Hospital in 1871. It moved to a new building in London Road financed by Sir William Julien Courtauld in 1921. It became the William Julien Courtauld Hospital in 1931 and joined the National Health Service in 1948. After services transferred to Broomfield Hospital, William Julien Courtauld Hospital closed in 2010. The buildings were subsequently demolished and the site redeveloped for residential use.
