= Sherwood Forest Hospitals NHS Foundation Trust =

NHS hospital trust

- Type: NHS foundation hospital trust
- Hospitals: King's Mill Hospital; Newark Hospital; Mansfield Community Hospital
- Chair: Claire Ward
- Chief executive: David Selwyn Acting chief executive
- Staff: 5,000
- Website: www.sfh-tr.nhs.uk

Sherwood Forest Hospitals NHS Foundation Trust was formed in 2001 and gained Foundation Trust status in 2007. It runs three hospitals in Nottinghamshire - King's Mill Hospital, Newark Hospital and Mansfield Community Hospital. It also operates services from Ashfield Health Village.

== Services ==
From September 2017 all referrals to the trust are made electronically using the NHS e-Referral Service. This has reduced the rate of patients missing appointments from 10% to 5%.

== Finance ==
The Trust has a substantial PFI scheme. The £265 million scheme which will run for 30 years covers new buildings, refurbishments, facilities, services, equipment and capital investment equipment costs and will run until March 2043. The partners to the scheme are Innisfree Ltd, Skanska, and Medirest. Total repayments under the contract will amount to £2.5 billion.

The Trust paid out £235,000 to two interim Chief Executives during 2012. Paul O'Connor, Chief Executive, resigned in April 2015 after less than 2 years in post.

Following an inspection by the Care Quality Commission in July 2016, the Trust received an overall rating of "requires improvement" in November 2016 and the regulator NHS Improvement lifted it out of special measures, in which it had been placed in 2013 following the Keogh Review. Although rated as "requires improvement" the CQC's report rated the Trust as "good" for care, recognising that it was among the best performing in the country for the four-hour emergency care standard and other waiting targets, tackling C-Diff, and managing patients at risk of cardiac arrest.

In October 2013 the Trust had been put into the highest risk category by the Care Quality Commission. In October 2015 a further CQC report showed deterioration. Only one of 18 high-level action points had been completed and it was rated inadequate for safety, effectiveness and being well-led. There were 54 serious incidents between March 2014 and February 2015 and 88 patients died of "unspecified septicaemia".

Sir Mike Richards recommended that the trust stay in special measures in October 2015 after the CQC reduced its rating to "inadequate". A Quality Improvement Programme was implemented during 2016. The regulators had said the trust needed a "close tie-up with a long term partner" in order to improve.

In 2014-2015 the trust was given a loan of £6.2 million by the Department of Health which is supposed to be paid back in five years.

In 2020, the trust was rated "Good", with its main hospital (Kings Mill Hospital) being rated "Outstanding". In 2021 it was named by the Health Service Journal as the Acute or Specialist Trust of the Year.

== See also ==
- List of NHS trusts
