= Charlotte Seymour Yapp =

British nurse (1879–1934)

- Born: 30 October 1879; Ardwick, Manchester, England
- Died: 21 March 1934 (aged 54); Kingswinford, Staffordshire, England
- Occupation: Nurse
- Years active: 1903–1925
- Organization(s): Poor Law Nursing Association; General Nursing Council for England and Wales

Charlotte Seymour Yapp (30 October 1879 – 21 March 1934) was a British nurse. She was an early member of the Poor Law Nursing Association and the General Nursing Council for England and Wales.

== Biography ==
Yapp was born on 30 October 1879 in Ardwick, Manchester, England. Her parents were railway guard Moses Yapp (1849–1926) and his wife, seamstress Sophia Eliza Yapp (née Seymour, 1850–1888). She was the eldest of their four children. By 1891 Yapp and her sister Annie were living with their widowed father in Edgbaston, Birmingham, Warwickshire, England. He remarried in 1892.

Yapp trained as a nurse at the Aston Union Poor Law Infirmary, completing her training in 1903. After qualifying, she worked at institutions in Keighley, Halifax, York, West Hartlepool and Tynemouth and as an infant health inspector in Lancashire. From 1914, Yapp was Matron of the hospital attached to the Ashton-under-Lyne workhouse in Lancashire, England.

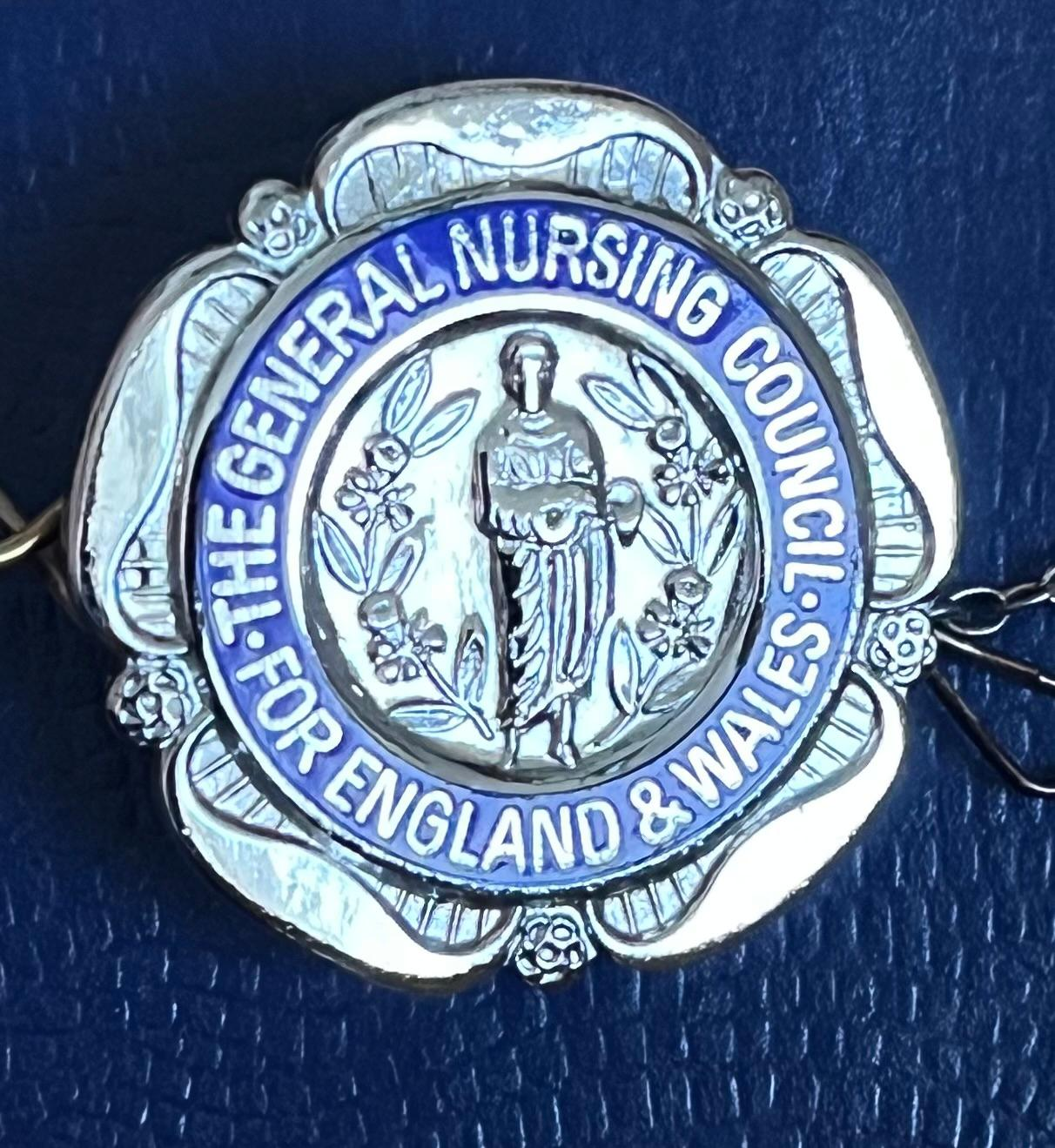
State Registered Nurse Badge of the General Nursing Council of England and Wales (GNC)

Yapp became an early and active member of the Poor Law Nursing Association and the General Nursing Council for England and Wales (GNC), the later of which had been established following the Nurses Registration Act 1919. She ardently worked for the registration of nurses.

Yapp was elected as "caretaker" of the GNC in 1920 and to the Council of the GNC in 1923. She represented poor law nurses and regional interests as well as defending occupational livelihoods on the council, as the only GNC Council member trained in a Poor Law institution. The GNC's first syllabus for nurse training, produced in 1925, was influenced by Yapp's pioneering training scheme which she had introduced in 1916 at the workhouse.

Yapp published textbooks on medical, surgical and paediatric nursing throughout her career. In her writing on paediatric nursing, she was among the first to advocate for children to be treated as children. Her textbook Practical Surgical Nursing for Probationers was positively reviewed by The Lancet as "a useful guide to a special subject."

In 1925, Yapp resigned from her position of Matron, and from the Council of the GNC, due to a period of ill health and heart problems. On her retirement, The Poor Law Officer’s Journal wrote that:

"Miss Yapp was a member of this body in troublesome days. At that time it was no easy task to hold the claims of the poor law in surroundings distinctly hostile…Week after week, month after month, Miss Yapp put the poor law case … in the end they were compelled to acquiesce … the fight is over but the nursing side of the poor law in respect of state registration owes more to Miss Yapp than is realised, the whole poor law is in her debt."

Yapp died on 21 March 1934 at Ashwood House (a private asylum in Kingswinford, Staffordshire, England), aged 54.

In 2019, a commemorative plaque in Yapp's honour was unveiled at Tameside and Glossop Integrated Care NHS Foundation Trust.
