= David Flory =

David Flory is a British National Health Service (NHS) manager, formerly the Chief Executive of the NHS Trust Development Authority. He was previously the director general of NHS finance, performance and operations.

Flory was said by the Health Service Journal to be the fourth most powerful person in the English NHS in December 2013.

In December 2013 Flory warned that there were at least 30 NHS hospital trusts facing serious problems and that the NHS would have to 'take out capacity' or cut services.

Flory's salary (£210,000) was the third highest in the NHS in 2013. In 2015 he received a termination payment of £410,000, which was criticized by the health unions. The payment was described as "in accordance with a settlement agreement agreed on completion of a fixed-term appointment set out in 2012." A ceiling of £160,000 on termination payments in the public sector was proposed by the British Government, to come into force in December 2015.

In 2021 he was chair of Lancashire and South Cumbria Integrated care system and interim chair of the Cheshire and Merseyside Integrated Care System.

In July 2022 he was appointed chairman of the board of the Lancashire Football Association.
