= Lancashire and South Cumbria NHS Foundation Trust =

Healthcare trust in Lancashire, England

- Former name: Lancashire Care NHS Foundation Trust
- Type: Mental health trust
- Chair: David Eva
- Chief executive: Caroline Donovan
- Staff: 7,000
- Website: www.lscft.nhs.uk

Lancashire & South Cumbria NHS Foundation Trust, known as Lancashire Care NHS Foundation Trust until October 2019, provides a range of services including secondary mental health care, inpatient child and adolescent mental health services, perinatal mental health and forensic services including low and medium secure care. It also provides a range of physical health and well-being services in the community with partners in the Lancashire and Sefton area. The Trust was first established in 2002 and employs approximately 7,000 staff who provide care from more than 400 sites.

== Development ==
The trust has built a new mental health inpatient unit in Blackpool, called The Harbour. The Harbour is a new 154 bedded mental health hospital situated on Preston New Road.

It deployed a new Servelec RiO electronic patient record in March 2018.

== Performance ==
In 2013/14 the trust sent 251 patients to private hospitals at a cost of £3.6m, an increase from 2012/13 when there were 136 referrals at a cost of £2.1m. The trust said a reduction in social care provision, an increase in mental health presentations and increased complexity of care requirements were to blame. The majority of spending with private hospitals was with the Priory Group Hospital in Preston (£4 million) and £1.2 million with Cygnet Health Care.

The trust only has 16 beds for children available in Lancashire — 10 for children under 16 at The Junction in Lancaster and six for those aged 16 and 17 at The Platform in Preston. 29 children were sent outside the county for treatment in 2016, some as far as Norwich, mostly because there were not enough beds available. It is planned to provide 56 more beds in 2017.

Problems at the trust led to more than 1,000 cases of patients in Lancashire waiting over 12 hours for admission in 2018-19. This was about a third of all the 12 hour breaches in England, which were mostly mental health cases. A review found that some patients were "potentially being held against their will without appropriate legal provision". Some were detained in seclusion rooms for more than a week under section 136 of the Mental Health Act 1983, which only provides that patients can be lawfully detained for 24 hours, with a possible 12-hour extension. The trust does not have any high dependency or complex care rehabilitation beds.

By 2021 the trust had securing funding to open around 90 additional beds, including a 28-bed unit in Wesham, and 32 on the Calderstones Hospital site in Whalley which the trust is to inherit from Mersey Care NHS Foundation Trust.

== Legal case ==
Lancashire Care NHS Foundation Trust and Blackpool Teaching Hospitals NHS Foundation Trust successfully but only temporarily challenged a procurement process for public health services for children aged 0 to 19 undertaken by Lancashire County Council in 2017. The Council's procurement process was not undertaken correctly and a proposed five-year contract award in favour of Virgin Care was set aside by the High Court. The same contract was later awarded to Virgin Care through a process overseen by independent experts.

== See also ==
- Mental health in the United Kingdom
