= Health and Social Care Board =

Governing body for Health and Social Care in Northern Ireland

The Health and Social Care Board was, until 2022, an organisation responsible for the commissioning of health services for the people of Northern Ireland.

== Creation ==
The Health and Social Care (Reform) Act (Northern Ireland) 2009 followed the Review of Public Administration in 2007 and led to a reorganisation of health and social care delivery in Northern Ireland. Prior to enactment of this legislation, healthcare delivery in Northern Ireland was provided by 4 health boards, 11 community and social services trusts and 7 hospital trusts. This Act established the Health and Social Care Board and five Health and Social Care Trusts which were responsible for the delivery of primary, secondary and community health care.

== Responsibilities ==
The responsibilities of the Health and Social Care board were to work in partnership with Northern Ireland's Public Health Agency to commission services, allocate resources and improve services for all people of Northern Ireland. Its commissioning is supported by five local commissioning groups that are geographically linked to five health and social care trusts. The Board was also directly responsible for community health care provided by general practitioners, dentists, opticians and community pharmacists. It reported directly to the Department of Health.

== Transforming Your Care ==
Transforming Your Care was a review of health and social care commissioned in 2011 by then Health Minister Edwin Poots and published in December 2011. The Health and Social Care Board was responsible for 72 of 99 recommendations made in the report.

== Abolition ==
In March 2016, then health minister Simon Hamilton announced that the Health and Social Care Board would be abolished and that commissioning responsibilities would be transferred directly to the Department of Health. His decision was met with criticism from both politicians and health professionals. The functions of the board were transferred to the Department of Health on 1 April 2022.
