= NHS Improvement =

Non-departmental health service oversight body in England

Non-departmental public body overview
- Formed: 1 April 2016
- Dissolved: 30 June 2022
- Superseding Non-departmental public body: NHS England
- Jurisdiction: England
- Headquarters: Wellington House, 133-155 Waterloo Road, London
- Parent department: Department of Health and Social Care
- Website: improvement.nhs.uk

NHS Improvement (NHSI) was a non-departmental body in England, responsible for overseeing the National Health Service's foundation trusts and NHS trusts, as well as independent providers that provide NHS-funded care. It supported providers to give patients consistently safe, high quality, compassionate care within local health systems that are financially sustainable.

A previous body – also called NHS Improvement – was set up in April 2008 to drive clinical service improvement, but was merged into NHS Improving Quality in 2013 following the Health and Social Care Act reforms.

From 1 April 2016, NHS Improvement was the operational name for an organisation that brought together Monitor, NHS Trust Development Authority, Patient Safety (from NHS England), National Reporting and Learning System, Advancing Change Team and Intensive Support Teams.

In 2018 it became clear that the organisation, while maintaining its statutory independence, was for practical reasons to be merged with NHS England, and seven "single integrated regional teams" would be jointly established. In February 2021, the government confirmed its intention to merge NHS Improvement into NHS England in its Integration and innovation white paper. The merger took place on 1 July 2022, at which point NHS Improvement ceased to exist, with its two legal entities, Monitor and the NHS Trust Development Authority, being abolished.

== Leadership ==
From 1 April 2019, NHS Improvement and NHS England worked together as a single organisation in the management of England's National Health Service, which had implications for the organisations' leadership.

=== NHS Executive Group ===
In 2021, the NHS Executive Group were:

- Amanda Pritchard, Chief Executive
- Mark Cubbon, Interim Chief Operating Officer
- Julian Kelly, Chief Financial Officer
- Professor Stephen Powis, National Medical Director and Interim NHS Improvement Chief Executive Officer
- Ruth May, Chief Nursing Officer, England
- Ian Dodge, National Director of Strategy
- Timothy Ferris, National Director of Transformation
- Anne Eden, South East Regional Director
- Ann Radmore, East of England Regional Director
- Dale Bywater, Midlands Regional Director
- Sir David Sloman, London Regional Director
- Elizabeth O’Mahony, South West Regional Director
- Amanda Doyle, North West Regional Director
- Richard Barker, North East and Yorkshire Regional Director
- Prerana Issar, Chief People Officer
- Hugh McCaughey, National Director of Improvement
- Pauline Philip, National Director for Emergency and Elective Care
- Matthew Gould, CEO of NHSX

=== NHS Improvement Board ===
In 2021, the NHS Improvement Board were:

==== Non-executive directors ====
- Baroness Dido Harding, Chair
- Sir Andrew Morris, Vice Chair
- Lord Patrick Carter of Coles, Non-Executive Director
- Wol Kolade, Non-Executive Director
- Sir Munir Pirmohamed, Non-Executive Director
- Rakesh Kapoor, Non-Executive Director
- Sir David Behan, Associate Non-Executive Director

==== Executive directors ====
- Professor Stephen Powis, National Medical Director and Interim NHS Improvement Chief Executive Officer
- Julian Kelly, Chief Financial Officer
- Ruth May, Chief Nursing Officer for England

== Learning from Mistakes League ==
In 2016, NHS Improvement published a league table of the 230 NHS trusts according to their openness and transparency. The 'Learning from Mistakes League' table classified trusts into four categories:

1. Outstanding levels of openness and transparency - 18;
2. Good levels of openness and transparency - 102;
3. Significant concerns about openness and transparency - 78;
4. Poor reporting culture -32.

Northumbria Healthcare NHS Foundation Trust was placed first and East Sussex Healthcare NHS Trust was at the bottom. Claire Murdoch, chief executive of Central and North West London NHS Foundation Trust, placed 125th, complained that the league had a “significant methodological flaw in terms of fairness” because it implied that there were significant differences between ranks 120 and 121, and because, she complained, the assessments were not carried out consistently and the large amount of information trusts reported monthly to the Care Quality Commission were not taken into account.

== Pathology network ==
In September 2017 a plan was produced to create 29 pathology networks across England in a bid to save £200 million. 1.12 billion tests are performed per year, at a cost of £2.2 billion.
