= Basildon and Thurrock University Hospitals NHS Foundation Trust =

English healthcare provider, 1991–2020

- Type: NHS foundation trust
- Established: 1 November 1991
- Disbanded: 1 April 2020
- Hospitals: Basildon University Hospital
- Staff: 4,935 (2019/20)

Basildon and Thurrock University Hospitals NHS Foundation Trust provided healthcare for people in south west Essex, in the East of England. There were two hospitals in the trust, a specialist cardiothoracic centre and one clinical centre: Basildon University Hospital, Orsett Hospital, The Essex Cardiothoracic Centre and Billericay St. Andrew's Centre. It became a Foundation Trust in 2004.

A merger with Southend University Hospital NHS Foundation Trust and Mid Essex Hospital Services NHS Trust was proposed in January 2018. On 31 July 2019 the Secretary of State for Health and Social Care endorsed the merger and a provisional date of 1 April 2020 was agreed.

== History ==
The trust was established as the Basildon and Thurrock General Hospitals NHS Trust on 1 November 1991, and became operational on 1 April 1992. It changed its name to the Basildon and Thurrock University Hospitals NHS Trust on 18 October 2002.

== Operation ==
In 2005 its budget was £146 million and it treated 55,000 patients. In 2013/14 the Trust budget was £288 million and it treated 77,500 inpatients and day cases, 300,000 outpatients and 103,000 A&E consultations.

The trust set up an Electronic health record system in 2010, digitising all its 450,000 patient records. It hopes to save £1 million per year in reduced operating costs and £1.6m a year by improved efficiency.

== Governance ==
The Trust used the Single Transferable Vote voting system to elect its Council of Governors.

On 28 March 2012, Ian Luder was announced as the new chair of the Trust. He took up the post on 1 July that year. In January 2015 he stepped down after being selected as the UKIP candidate for South Basildon and East Thurrock.

== Performance ==
The trust had a 3 star rating in 2006.

In November 2009, the Care Quality Commission found some places in Basildon Hospital to have stained floors and curtains, blood-splattered trays, badly soiled mattresses, equipment still used after the use-by date, and so on. The CQC have said they are going to send an "expert taskforce" into the hospital, to improve the cleanliness and drive rapid improvements in patient care. The latest CQC inspection of Basildon Hospital in March 2014 found significant improvements. Services were described as effective, caring, responsive and well-led with seven out of eight areas rated as good or outstanding.

In July 2013 as a result of the Keogh Review the Trust was put into special measures by Monitor In October 2013 the Trust was put into the highest risk category by the Care Quality Commission. It was put into a buddying arrangement with Royal Free London NHS Foundation Trust. In June 2014 it was the first trust to come out of special measures after what the health secretary described as a "remarkable turnaround".

The trust described how a radical overhaul of its corporate governance structure and risk management improved its safety record. Staff were encouraged to report near misses, raising the number of incidents reported.

In 2014/5 the trust was given a loan of £10.6 million by the Department of Health which was supposed to be paid back in five years but has in fact already been repaid. It spent 9.4% of its total turnover on agency staff in 2014/5.

In January 2016 it was said by Monitor to be "financially unsustainable".

== Pathology ==
A joint pathology venture with Southend University Hospital NHS Foundation Trust and Integrated Pathology Partnerships was set up in August 2014. A new laboratory was built at laboratory at Dobson House, in Bentalls, Basildon. It is expected to process more than 12 million tests per year for 250 GP surgeries as well as the two hospital trusts.

== Hospital Radio ==
Basildon Hospital has had its own Hospital Radio service since 1974. It started life in a broadcasting van outside of the hospital premises. They now operate a full 24 hour service with a full program service every evening from 7 p.m. until late and all day at the weekends with a music jukebox playing during non-broadcasting hours.

Programs are based around specific genres such as country, 60's, jazz, charts, and quiz shows. In 2014 they celebrated their 40th anniversary with the hospital departments being involved in the celebrations, local press coverage covered the birthday weekend and local MP Stephen Metcalfe (politician) joined the celebrations.

The alternative name for the station is BHR1287 and can be listened to not only in the hospital but outside on am radio 1287 locally and on various music apps nationally.

== Location ==
Basildon University Hospital is located in Basildon, to the south of the town centre at 51°33′30″N 0°27′13″E. Orsett Hospital is located in Orsett. St Andrew's Centre is located in Billericay.

== See also ==
- Healthcare in Essex
- List of NHS trusts
