= HCRG Care Group =

British private community health provider

- Formerly: Assura Medical; Virgin Care
- Type: Subsidiary
- Industry: Health care, social care
- Founded: 2007 (as Assura Medical)
- Headquarters: United Kingdom
- Owner: Twenty20 Capital
- Website: www.hcrgcaregroup.com

HCRG Care Group is a private provider of community health and social services in parts of the United Kingdom, commissioned by the National Health Service and by local authorities in England.

Founded in 2007 as Assura Medical, the company became majority-owned by the Virgin Group in 2010 and was known as Virgin Care. In December 2021, it was acquired by Twenty20 Capital and rebranded under its current name.

== History ==
Logo as Virgin Care

The company originated in around 2007 as the Assura Medical division of property company Assura Group. A majority share was purchased by Virgin Group in 2010, and by 2012 it was a separate company under the Virgin Care brand.

Until October 2012, each GP provider company was 50% owned by the surgery GPs and 50% by Virgin, and these companies were run by a board consisting of locally elected GPs and one Virgin representative. 358 surgeries were listed as being involved in mid-2012.

In October 2012 the company announced that it would be taking over all jointly owned GP-provider companies, in order to avoid any conflict of interest arising in respect of contracts with clinical commissioning groups. Following this change, the company made bids for contracts put out by these clinical commissioning groups, NHS England and local authorities, and has contracts stretching for more than a decade with a total potential value (as of 2018) of £2bn.

In December 2021, the company was acquired for an undisclosed sum by Twenty20 Capital, a privately owned investor in companies that provide workforce management and recruitment services. It was immediately rebranded as HCRG Care Group.

=== Ransomware ===
HCRG Care Group was the target of a cyberattack in February 2025 from the Medusa ransomware group. Medusa claimed to have encrypted over 50tb of data, with over 2tb of data of it being uploaded, including sensitive medical records, financial records, and identities. The group demanded $2m ransom to not release the data.

In March, HCRG Care Group attempted to use a UK court-ordered injunction to compel a cybersecurity breach reporting website, databreaches.net, to remove references to examples of data taken from HCRG Care Group's systems. The injunction was issued by High Court judge Michael Soole, based on the request by HCRG's attorneys at Pinsent Masons. The US-based maintainer of the website refused to comply due to the injunction's inapplicable jurisdiction, and published details of the injunction online, noting the chilling effects of suppressing speech. Their domain registrar also declined to comply. HCRG notified patients their personal information was breached 15 months later.

== Financial performance ==
=== Virgin Care Group ownership ===
The company said in 2018 that it had never made a profit overall from its NHS services, and that it had invested its own money into the business, although accounts show that individual parts of the group with NHS contracts have made profits.

Sir Richard Branson wrote in January 2018:

Over the last 50 years, I have been fortunate to build many successful companies and do not want or intend to profit personally from the NHS. Indeed, I have invested millions in Virgin Care to help it transform its services for the better and to improve both the patient and employee experience. Contrary to reports, the Virgin Care group has not made a profit to date. If and when I could take a dividend from Virgin Care (which would make us a profit over and above our overall investment), I will invest 100% of that money back into helping NHS patients young and old, with our frontline employees deciding how best to spend it.

In December 2021, the company's press release said: "Neither Virgin, nor its founder, has ever taken a penny from the business, committing instead to reinvest any returns back into the company and its frontline services."

=== Twenty20 Capital ownership ===
The published accounts for HCRG Care Services Ltd (Company No. 07557877) show turnover for the year ended 31 March 2025 of £277.2 million, up from £265.8 million in 2024. Profit after tax for the year to March 2025 was £10.6 million (2024: £8.9 million).

Twenty20 Capital stated they had reduced back-office costs to an industry-low of 8%.

== Current contracts ==
=== Surrey ===
Virgin Care won a contract to provide community health services in Surrey from 2012 until 2017. This includes the Jarvis Breast Centre in Guildford, which in October 2014 was subject to an investigation by North West Surrey Clinical Commissioning Group after 35 patients were not tested within two weeks of their GP referrals during April and July. In 2017, Surrey's CCGs split the contract again and procured elements of it separately, with Virgin Care awarded some adult community services in the Surrey Heath CCG and North East Hampshire and Farnham CCG areas, as well as continuing to operate community dental services and wheelchair services.

In September 2019, the company was awarded an £85m contract to run a joint project with Frimley Health NHS Foundation Trust.

In 2024, Surrey Heartlands ICB and Surrey County Council awarded HCRG a contract to deliver children's services. This was the same services which, as Virgin Care, the company had lost in a procurement process and subsequently taken legal action over.

=== Bath and North East Somerset ===
The company won a seven-year £700m prime provider contract to run health services in Bath and North East Somerset in 2016. This included running adult social work services, something that had not been done by a commercial organisation in the UK before. Forty-three social workers were transferred to the company. The service experienced significant IT issues during its first three months of operation which resulted in the cancellation of patient appointments, correspondence not being sent out and problems with updating patient records.

In 2021, as a result of this contract, the company's managing director was noted to have been given a seat on the BSW Partnership Board.

In that year, the services provided were reported to include two community hospitals, outpatients' clinics, and school nursing and immunisation services. The organisation's contract was extended to 2027, taking it to the full 10-year term, at a slightly reduced £54.5m as a result of two services being brought back in-house. Councillor Rob Appleyard told a scrutiny panel meeting that awarding the contract was "not universally accepted" and there was "continual distrust", but "Covid was the making of the relationship with Virgin Care".

In 2024, its contracts to deliver public health services for children and families was renewed.

In 2025, the company was awarded a new contract seeing it delivering many of its existing services, as well as expanding its footprint delivering community services across the BSW ICB area.

=== Lancashire ===
In 2016, the company won a five-year contract from West Lancashire CCG to provide adult community health services and urgent care services across the area. Commissioners said that the contract would lead to more "joined up" care. In May 2021, the service was rated good by the CQC in its first inspection.

In 2018, Lancashire County Council awarded a £104m contract to provide public health services for children aged 0 to 19 following a re-evaluation of bids after a high court decision that the council had not followed the proper procurement process. In May 2025, the council awarded a further five-year contract to HCRG Care Group to continue delivering the services.

=== Kent ===
Community services in part of Kent, previously provided by Kent Community Health NHS Foundation Trust, were transferred to Virgin Care by Swale CCG and Dartford, Gravesham and Swanley CCG in January 2016 in a contract worth £18 million a year for the seven years from April 2016, with an option to extend by a further three years.

During 2025 Kent and Medway ICB undertook a public procurement of community services. The contract was awarded to Kent Community Health NHS Foundation Trust as lead provider in a partnership between themselves, HCRG Care Group and Medway Community Healthcare. HCRG Care Group is sub-contracted for this contract and, as part of this, continues to be the main provider of services in Dartford, Gravesham, Swanley and Swale. The contract will run for at least five years with an option to extend by up to three years.

=== Slough ===
Slough Borough Council awarded HCRG Care Group a contract to deliver its public health services for children and families in 2024. The contract length and value were not stated.

=== Wiltshire ===
The company was commissioned by Wiltshire Council in 2016 to provide health services for infants and children aged 0 to 19, as well as support for mothers aged 19 and under, and parenting programmes. In 2023, the contract was renewed until at least 2029.

== Former contracts ==
=== Lyme Regis medical practice ===
In 2012, Virgin Care won a contract to provide services in Dorset, at the Lyme Regis Centre, for five years. When the service was inspected by the regulator in August 2015, the minor injuries unit was found 'not safe' by the Care Quality Commission because "patients were at risk of harm because systems and processes were not in place to keep them safe". Inspectors returned in February 2016 and found improvements, and in August 2016 a desk-based inspection based on information from the company rated the practice 'good' in all areas. The service was rated 'good' again by the CQC in October 2018, but inspectors said it needed to do more and rated it 'requires improvement' for services for people with long term conditions. The contract ended in 2019 after a short extension, when the NHS merged it with another local GP practice.

=== Croydon urgent care centre ===
Virgin Care ran the urgent care centre at Croydon University Hospital under a £6 million contract for three years from April 2012.

=== East Staffordshire ===
The company won a seven-year contract worth £270 million for providing long-term and elderly care for about 38,000 people with long-term health conditions in East Staffordshire in March 2015, known as the "Improving Lives" programme. A report by the Care Quality Commission published in October 2019 rated the service 'good'. Virgin Care terminated its role as prime provider in October 2018 after an 18-month-long dispute and went on to terminate the remaining part of the contract in May 2019.

== Legal cases ==
- In October 2012, a mother of two children mounted a challenge in the High Court against Devon County Council's decision to award health and social care contracts to Virgin Care. The court allowed Virgin Care to keep the contract.
- In early 2017, Virgin Care began legal proceedings against NHS England, Surrey County Council and the county's six clinical commissioning groups, claiming there were defects in the procurement process which led to another provider winning an £82 million three-year children's community services contract. The lawsuit was settled out of court with a £328,000 payment to Virgin Care, resulting in some controversy. This included a petition signed by over 100,000 people addressed to Richard Branson and Virgin Care, demanding that they "return the NHS's money, and never sue the NHS again", as well as criticism in Parliament from Shadow Health Secretary Jonathon Ashworth, who claimed that the NHS is already "underfunded" without having to make payments to private health companies. Virgin Care stated that the money would be invested in services, rather than paid out to Virgin Group or Richard Branson.
- Lancashire County Council (LCC) planned to award Virgin Care a five-year £104m contract in 2017 to provide public health services for children aged 0 to 19. Two Lancashire-area NHS Trusts, (Note: Lancashire Care NHS Foundation Trust and Blackpool Teaching Hospitals NHS Foundation Trust) who were the incumbent service providers, had jointly bid for the contract. They contested the decision to award a contract to Virgin Care on the grounds that the Council had not properly followed the procurement process. The High Court upheld the Trusts' concern and concluded that the procurement decision should be set aside. In 2018, after LCC had re-evaluated the bids, in a process overseen by an independent panel of experts, it again chose Virgin Care. The decision was criticised by UNISON on the grounds that it would destabilise the NHS in Lancashire, that the gap between the two bids was only 0.07%, and that the council was helping to privatise the delivery of key NHS services.

== See also ==
- Private healthcare in the United Kingdom
