= Broomfield Hospital =

- Mid and South Essex NHS Foundation Trust
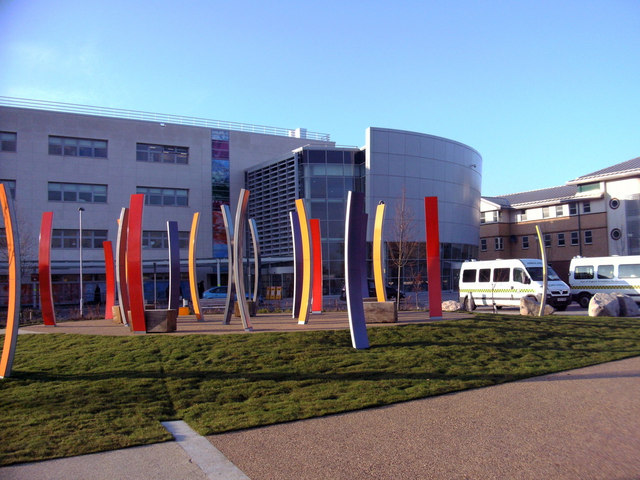
- New Entrance

- Shown in Essex

Geography
- Location: Court Road, Broomfield, Chelmsford, Essex, England
- Coordinates: 51.7745°N 0.4661°E

Organisation
- Care system: National Health Service
- Type: General
- Affiliated university: Barts and The London School of Medicine and Dentistry; Anglia Ruskin School of Medicine

Services
- Emergency department: Yes
- Beds: 800

Helipads
- Helipad: Yes

History
- Founded: 1940

Links
- Website: www.mse.nhs.uk/broomfield-hospital/

Broomfield Hospital is an acute district general hospital in Chelmsford, Essex. It is managed by the Mid and South Essex NHS Foundation Trust.

== History ==
The hospital, originally known as Essex County Hospital, was designed as a hospital for the treatment of tuberculosis patients and was built between June 1937 and 1940. It had "butterfly" wings that caught the sun for the benefit of the patients. During the 1960s the hospital diversified from tuberculosis treatment and dealt with more general surgery, orthopaedics and general medicine. A large outpatients clinic was also built at this time.

By the early 1980s facilities included an accident and emergency department, pharmacy, rehabilitation department, operating theatres, intensive therapy unit and new specialised wards. A CT Scanner was unveiled by the Princess Royal in 1987 and she returned to open a new ward block in 1987. A new East Wing, a new Diabetic Centre and a new Medical Assessment Unit were all opened between 1998 and 1999.

Further new facilities, including a new accident and emergency facility, new intensive care facilities, new theatres for day surgery, a new pathology department, a new maternity department, improved facilities for neo-natal intensive care, a new children's department and a rooftop helipad were procured under a Private Finance Initiative contract in 2007. The works, which were designed by Llewelyn Davies and carried out by Bouygues at a cost of £180 million, were completed in 2010. The new facilities also permitted the subsequent closure of St John's Hospital in Chelmsford and the William Julien Courtauld Hospital in Braintree.

Sam Penry, a diagnostic radiographer at the hospital, was awarded the "UK Radiographer of the Year" title by the Society and College of Radiographers in 2017.

== Teaching ==
The hospital serves as a teaching hospital for medical students from Barts and The London School of Medicine and Dentistry. More recently, Broomfield was affiliated with Anglia Ruskin School of Medicine.

== See also ==
- Healthcare in Essex
- List of hospitals in England
