= Southend University Hospital =

Hospital in Essex, England

- Mid and South Essex NHS Foundation Trust
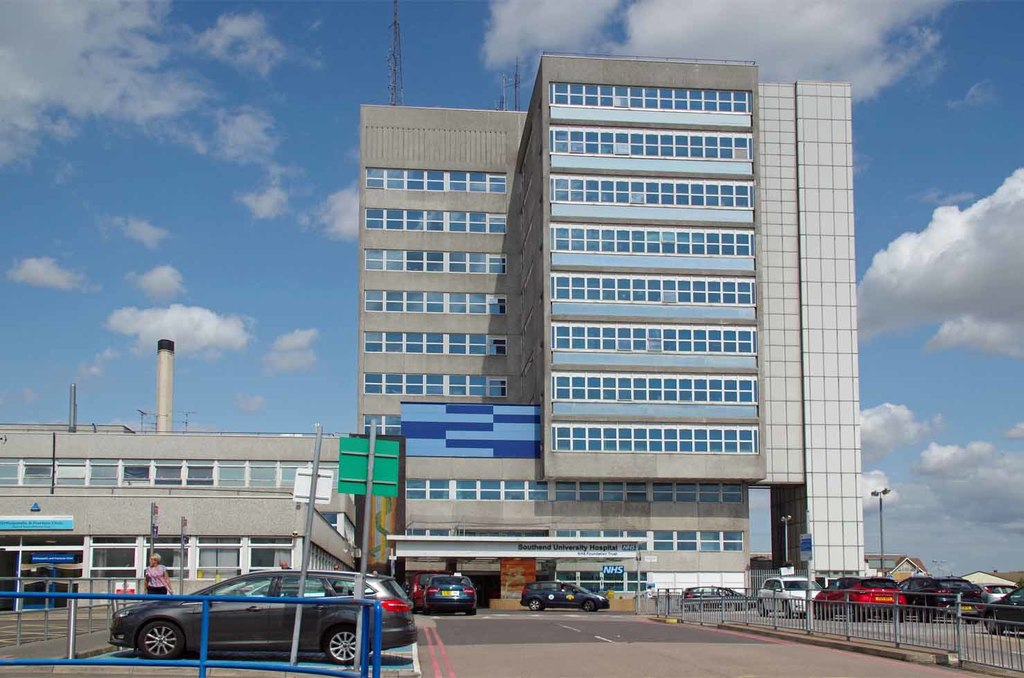
- The hospital block

- Shown in Essex

Geography
- Location: Westcliff-on-Sea, Southend-on-Sea, Essex, England
- Coordinates: 51.5542°N 0.6878°E

Organisation
- Care system: National Health Service
- Affiliated university: Anglia Ruskin University; Barts and The London School of Medicine and Dentistry

Services
- Emergency department: Yes
- Beds: 737

History
- Founded: 1888

Links
- Website: www.mse.nhs.uk/southend-hospital

Southend University Hospital is an NHS hospital located in Westcliff-on-Sea, Southend-on-Sea, Essex. It is managed by Mid and South Essex NHS Foundation Trust.

== History ==
In 1887, to celebrate Queen Victoria's Golden Jubilee, a public fund was started with the aim of building a hospital, and the site for Southend's first hospital was bought for £350 (in Warrior Square, near to Southend High Street). Built at a cost of £1,287 4s 6d, Southend Victoria Hospital was opened in May 1888. By Christmas, with eight beds and two cots, it had treated 61 patients at an average weekly cost of 4s 6d (22.5p).

In order to allow expansion a new site was identified at Westcliff-on-Sea: building work on the new hospital, which was designed by Henry Percy Adams, began in 1930 and the new building was officially opened by the Rupert Guinness, 2nd Earl of Iveagh in 1932. In 1948, when the hospital joined the National Health Service, there were 24 consultants and 11 resident medical staff. The Tower Block was officially opened by Princess Anne in 1971.

In December 2013, chief executive Jacqueline Totterdell announced that the Trust was considering merging some functions with other local hospitals.

The trust was the only one in England not to follow the Agenda for Change conditions of service for its staff, but in January 2019 it decided to revert to the national contract.

In April 2021 the hospital's Cherry Tree Wing opened. The first and second floors of the wing were opened in June 2021.

== Teaching ==
The hospital serves as a teaching hospital for medical students from University of Essex, Anglia Ruskin University and Barts and The London School of Medicine and Dentistry.

== Transport ==
Local bus routes 7 and 8 operated by Arriva and 20, 21 and 25 operated by First, serve the hospital. The nearest railway stations are Westcliff and Southend Central on the London, Tilbury and Southend line and Prittlewell and Southend Victoria on the Southend branch of the Great Eastern Main Line.
