= Life Sciences Hub Wales =

Welsh Government body

- Hwb Gwyddoriaeth Bywyd Cymru
- Formation: 7 October 2013
- Type: Private company limited by guarantee
- Legal status: Wholly owned subsidiary of the Welsh Government
- Headquarters: 3 Assembly Square Britannia Quay, Cardiff, CF10 4PLH
- Owner: Welsh Government
- Chief Executive Officer: Cari-Anne Quinn

Life Sciences Hub Wales is an arm's-length body of the Welsh Government, constituted as a private company limited by guarantee in 2013. It is wholly owned by the Welsh Ministers, and was established to foster collaboration and bring together academic, business, clinical, government, professional services and funding organisations to provide a commercially driven resource for the sector. The hub was reported to have over 7500 unique visitors in its first 18 months of operation.

Following the death of Chris McGuigan the hub building in Cardiff Bay was renamed the Chris McGuigan Hub in his memory. The plaque was placed outside the entrance to the hub and was unveiled in a private event by his daughters Phoebe and Grace, accompanied by his wife Maria.
