= Mid Essex Hospital Services NHS Trust =

Healthcare trust in England

- Type: NHS trust
- Established: 1 November 1991
- Disbanded: 1 April 2020
- Hospitals: Broomfield Hospital
- Staff: 4,422 (2019/20)

Mid Essex Hospital Services NHS Trust was an NHS trust which ran Broomfield Hospital in Chelmsford, St Peter's Hospital in Maldon, St Michael's Hospital in Braintree and formerly St John's Hospital in Chelmsford until its closure in 2010.

A merger with Basildon and Thurrock University Hospitals NHS Foundation Trust and Southend University Hospital NHS Foundation Trust was proposed in January 2018. On 31 July 2019 the Secretary of State for Health and Social Care endorsed the merger and the trusts merged on 1 April 2020 to form Mid and South Essex NHS Foundation Trust.

== History ==
The trust was established on 1 November 1991, and became operational on 1 April 1992. It took over services previously provided by the Mid Essex Health Authority.

It was announced in March 2014 that the trust would take over Serco’s contract for running services at Braintree Community Hospital from the start of April.

== Performance ==
The Trust predicts a deficit of £19.6m in 2013-14. In May 2014 it was reported that the trust, which posted revenues of £275m in 2013-14, faced a structural deficit of around £15m related to a private finance initiative deal that funded a raft of improvements and was looking for a financial rescue package from the NHS Trust Development Authority.

The trust was one of 26 responsible for half of the national growth in patients waiting more than four hours in accident and emergency over the 2014/5 winter.

Inspectors from the Care Quality Commission discovered during a visit in February 2015 that Broomfield and Braintree Community hospitals were using unqualified nursing staff in an emergency unit.

In April 2017, the Care Quality Commission rated Mid Essex Hospital as "Good" overall

The trust spent £18 million on agency staff in 2014/5. In February 2016 it was expecting a deficit of £38.4 million for the year 2015/6, and in February 2018 it expected a deficit of £55 million for the year.

== Other ==
In November 2010, St. John's Hospital in Chelmsford closed and all services were transferred to Broomfield Hospital.

Former chief executive Ruth May went on to be Chief Nursing Officer for England, from January 2019.

== See also ==
- List of NHS trusts
- Healthcare in Essex
