= NHS Trust Development Authority =

The NHS Trust Development Authority (NHSTDA) was an executive non-departmental public body of the Department of Health. Its formation came as a result of reorganisation of the National Health Service (NHS) in England outlined in the Health and Social Care Act 2012. It became part of NHS Improvement which itself ceased to exist on 1 July 2022.

== Organisation ==
David Flory was its chief executive. He retired in May 2015.

The NHSTDA existed to manage the process of NHS trusts becoming foundation trusts and to performance manage those hospital trusts that remained directly accountable to the NHS. In March 2014 it was reported there were 20 trusts which the TDA expected to end 2013-14 in the red. The Authority compiled a categorised list of NHS trusts, segmented into six broad groups, some of which were regarded as unlikely to have a future as independent organisations but refused to publish it.

It was announced in June 2015 that the chief executive posts at Monitor and the Authority were to be merged, although there would not be a complete merger of the organisations. Subsequently it was reported that the two organisations were to be completely merged.

From 1 April 2016, the organisation is now part of NHS Improvement.
