= Basildon University Hospital =

Hospital in Basildon, Essex

- Mid and South Essex NHS Foundation Trust
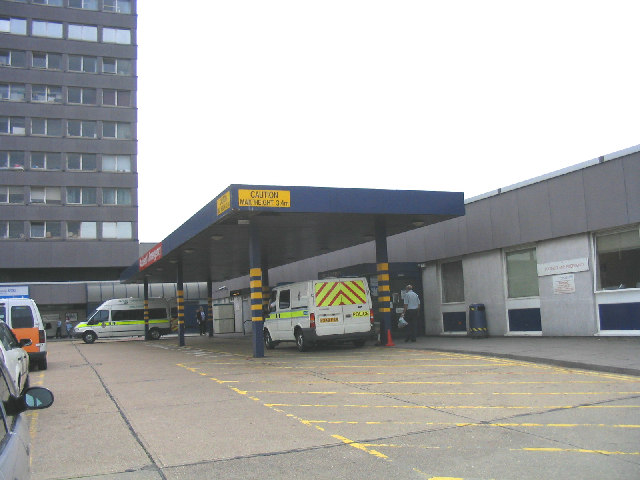
- Basildon University Hospital

- Shown in Essex

Geography
- Location: Basildon, Essex, England
- Coordinates: 51.5579°N 0.4517°E

Organisation
- Care system: National Health Service
- Type: General
- Affiliated university: UCL Medical School

Services
- Emergency department: Yes

History
- Founded: 31 March 1973

Links
- Website: www.mse.nhs.uk/basildon-university-hospital

Basildon University Hospital is an acute general hospital in Basildon, Essex. It is managed by the Mid and South Essex NHS Foundation Trust.

== History ==
The hospital was built by Sir Lindsay Parkinson & Company, and opened in 1973. Facilities which it replaced included St. Andrew's Hospital in Billericay which subsequently became a regional plastic surgery and rehabilitation unit. The Essex Cardiothoracic Centre, which was built at a cost of £60 million, was opened by Prime Minister Gordon Brown at Basildon University Hospital in July 2007.

== Performance ==
The Care Quality Commission rated Basildon University Hospital overall as good.

== Basildon Hospital Radio ==
Basildon Hospital Radio provides radio services in the hospital. The first broadcast was April 1974 from a van outside the maternity unit, they now broadcast from the main building and present a variety of shows covering many genres.
