= Blackpool Teaching Hospitals NHS Foundation Trust =

- Type: NHS hospital trust
- Established: 1 October 2010
- Hospitals: Blackpool Victoria Hospital
- Chair: James Wilkie
- Chief executive: Maggie Oldham
- Website: www.blackpoolteachinghospitals.nhs.uk

Blackpool Teaching Hospitals NHS Foundation Trust is an NHS Foundation Trust providing health services in North Lancashire, England. It runs Blackpool Victoria Hospital which is a large busy acute hospital; two smaller community hospitals - Clifton Hospital and Fleetwood Hospital; the National Artificial Eye Service; Blenheim House Child Development Centre and community health services for North Lancashire.

The organisation gained Foundation Trust status in 2007 as Blackpool, Fylde and Wyre Hospitals NHS Foundation Trust.

In 2017 the trust established a subsidiary company, BFW Management Ltd (Trading as Atlas), to which 150 estates and facilities staff were transferred. The company as of 2019 employed over 200 staff. The intention was to achieve VAT benefits, as well as pay bill savings, by recruiting new staff on less expensive non-NHS contracts. VAT benefits arise because NHS trusts can only claim VAT back on a small subset of goods and services they buy. The Value Added Tax Act 1994 provides a mechanism through which NHS trusts can qualify for refunds on contracted out services.

In 2021 Trish Armstrong-Child, formerly the Chief Executive of Southport and Ormskirk Hospital NHS Trust, was appointed as chief executive.

== Performance ==
In December 2013 the Trust was one of thirteen hospital trusts named by Dr Foster Intelligence as having higher than expected higher mortality indicator scores for the period April 2012 to March 2013 in their Hospital Guide 2013.

The Trust recorded a deficit of £0.5 Million in 2012-13 but predicted a surplus of £3.2m in 2013–14. In 2013/14 the trust actually recorded a £12.4m deficit, and £15.3m expenditure on temporary staff.

The Trust was instrumental in devising and piloting a health care plan in 2015 to give youngsters who suffer from diabetes an individualised care 'manual', so school teaching staff know about their condition.

It was named by the Health Service Journal as one of the top hundred NHS trusts to work for in 2015. At that time it had 5738 full time equivalent staff and a sickness absence rate of 4.33%. 62% of staff recommend it as a place for treatment and 62% recommended it as a place to work.

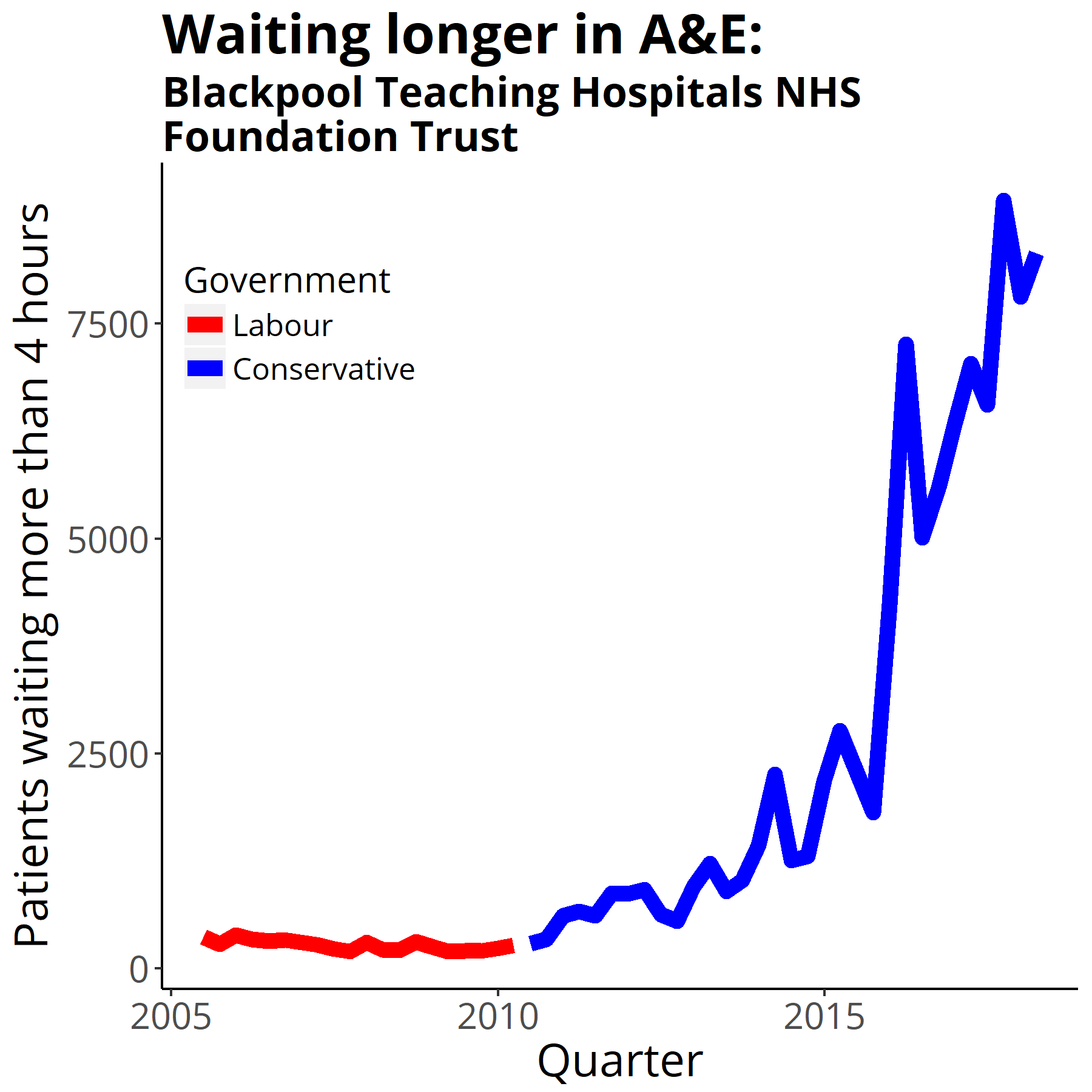
Four-hour target in the emergency department quarterly figures from NHS England Data from https://www.england.nhs.uk/statistics/statistical-work-areas/ae-waiting-times-and-activity/

In February 2016 the trust had the worst performance in England against the four-hour target in emergency departments with a performance of 63% against the target of 95%. Its handover times from paramedics to casualty staff were also very poor, with a designated "corridor nurse" employed to manage patients for whom there was no bed available. In March 2018 it was still the worst performer in England, with only 48.3% of patients in the main A&E seen within 4 hours, and 62 waiting more than 12 hours from the decision to admit to actual admission to a ward. In December 2019 it was the second worst performing trust in England, with only 44.2% seen within 4 hours.

The poor quality of patient notes, record management and information sharing in the trust has been cited by coroners in at least five inquests between 2016 and 2019 and been raised by the Care Quality Commission. There is an electronic patient record in the emergency department, provided by IMS MAXIMS, and it is intended to roll this out into the rest of the hospital when funding is available.

In 2022 the maternity department, suffering severe staffing problems, was issued with a warning notice by the Care Quality Commission when they found women waiting up to five days for labour to be induced.

== Legal case ==
Blackpool Teaching Hospitals NHS Foundation Trust and Lancashire Care NHS Foundation Trust successfully but only temporarily challenged a procurement process for public health services for children aged 0 to 19 undertaken by Lancashire County Council in 2017. The council's procurement process was not undertaken correctly and a proposed five-year contract award in favour of Virgin Care was set aside by the High Court. The same contract was later awarded to Virgin Care through a process overseen by independent experts.

== See also ==
- List of hospitals in England
- List of NHS trusts
