= British health law =

British health law concerns the laws in the United Kingdom concerning health care and medicine, primarily administered through the National Health Service.

== History ==
- Local board of health
- UK Medical Act 1876
- Apothecaries Act 1815
- Dentists Act 1984
- Medical Act 1858
- National Health Service Act 1977
- Royal Commission on the NHS (1979) Cmnd 7615
- National Health Service and Community Care Act 1990, NHS internal market
- NHS Plan 2000 more money, and more competition
- National Health Service Act 2006
- Regional hospital boards (1947–1974) under the National Health Service Act 1946
- Regional health authority (UK) (1974-1996), 14 RHA's since the National Health Service Reorganisation Act 1973 plus 90 area health authorities. Also community health councils (1974-2003) with local council, charity appointees were meant to meet the public
- NHS Executive (1996-2002) with 8 regional offices.
- Strategic health authorities, 28 in total, and List of Primary Care Trusts in England (2001-2013). Commission for Patient and Public Involvement in Health which ran patients' forums (2003-2008) was replaced 151 local involvement networks (2008-2013)
- Clinical commissioning group under the Health and Social Care Act 2012, originally 211 CCGs, but shrinking with mergers. The Care Quality Commission (2009-today) inspects hospitals, GPs and homes, and appoints the director of Healthwatch England which organises 148 Healthwatch groups.
- Healthcare in Greater Manchester
- National Health Service Act 1966 (c 8) s 10 required GP remuneration to be partly linked to the number of patients they saw.
- National Health Service Act 1977 (c 49)
- National Health Service (Primary Care) Act 1997 (c 46)
- NHS Redress Act 2006

== Research ==
- Human Fertilisation and Embryology Act 1990
- Human Fertilisation and Embryology Act 2008
- Human Fertilisation and Embryology Authority
- Human Genetics Commission
- Human Reproductive Cloning Act 2001

== Mental health ==
- Bethlem Royal Hospital

== See also ==
- UK enterprise law
