= List of primary care trusts in England =

Primary care trusts were abolished on 31 March 2013 as part of the Health and Social Care Act 2012, with their commissioning work taken over by clinical commissioning groups. Their public health role was transferred to local authorities and to Public Health England. Their community service provision was distributed in various ways, some to community health trusts. This list is of the PCTs which existed in 2012.

== History ==
In October 2006, all primary care trusts (PCTs) outside the London area were restructured. This reduced the number of PCTs from 303 to 152. At the same time, the number of strategic health authorities (SHAs) (which have responsibility for the PCTs) were also decreased (from 28 to 10). These ten new SHAs largely mimic the geography of the government office regions. The exception to this was the South East Government Office Region which is covered by two strategic health authorities: South Central SHA and South East Cost SHA.

The PCTs were organised into clusters so as to achieve management cost savings, although the PCTs themselves remained separate statutory bodies. Whilst the majority of clusters contained multiple PCTs, there were some clusters, such as Cumbria, which consisted of just a single primary care trust. In October 2011, the ten SHAs were also grouped into clusters, with each having its own executive team, chief executive, and directors. There were four SHA clusters, and these were London, North of England, NHS Midlands and East, and South of England.

As a result of the Health and Social Care Act 2012, all PCTs and SHAs were abolished on 31 March 2013, and replaced by clinical commissioning groups taking over the function of commissioning health and care services.

== London ==
NHS London was the strategic health authority for the capital, with responsibility for 31 PCTs which operated in five clusters. The PCTs were coterminous with London borough boundaries.

=== NHS North East London and the City ===
In April 2012, North East London and the City was created from the merger of two previous PCT clusters; NHS East London and the City, and NHS Outer North East London.

- Barking and Dagenham PCT
- Havering PCT
- Redbridge PCT
- Waltham Forest PCT
- City and Hackney Teaching PCT
- Newham PCT
- Tower Hamlets PCT

=== North Central London ===
- Camden PCT
- Enfield PCT
- Haringey Teaching PCT
- Islington PCT

=== North West London ===
- Brent Teaching PCT
- Ealing PCT
- NHS Hammersmith and Fulham
- Kensington and Chelsea PCT
- Harrow PCT
- Hillingdon PCT
- NHS Hounslow
- Westminster PCT

=== South West London ===
- NHS Croydon - Croydon Primary Care Trust
- Kingston PCT
- Sutton and Merton PCT
- Richmond and Twickenham PCT
- Wandsworth PCT

=== South East London ===
- Bexley Care Trust
- Bromley PCT
- Greenwich Teaching PCT
- Lambeth PCT
- Lewisham PCT
- Southwark PCT

== North of England ==
The North of England SHA cluster was made up of three strategic health authorities; NHS Yorkshire and the Humber, NHS North West and NHS North East.

=== NHS North East ===
NHS North East consisted of 12 PCTs organised into 4 clusters.

==== County Durham and Darlington ====
- County Durham PCT – Created by a merger of five primarycCaretTrusts in 2006. These PCTs were: Derwentside, Durham and Chester-le-Street, Durham Dales, Easington and Sedgefield PCTs.
- Darlington PCT

==== North of Tyne ====
- Newcastle PCT
- North Tyneside PCT
- Northumberland Care Trust

==== South of Tyne and Wear ====
- Gateshead PCT
- South Tyneside PCT
- Sunderland Teaching PCT

==== Tees ====
- NHS Hartlepool
- NHS Middlesbrough
- NHS Redcar and Cleveland
- NHS Stockton-on-Tees

=== NHS North West ===
NHS North West consisted of 24 PCTs organised into 5 PCT clusters.

==== Cheshire, Warrington and Wirral ====
- Central and Eastern Cheshire PCT
- Warrington PCT
- Western Cheshire PCT
- Wirral PCT - Formed on 1 October 2006 from the merger of Birkenhead & Wallasey PCT, and Bebington & West Wirral PCT

==== Cumbria ====
- Cumbria PCT

==== Greater Manchester ====
- NHS Ashton, Leigh and Wigan
- Bolton PCT
- Bury PCT
- Heywood, Middleton and Rochdale PCT
- Manchester PCT (Merged from Manchester North, South and Central PCTs)
- NHS Oldham
- Salford PCT
- Stockport PCT
- Tameside and Glossop PCT - This PCT reported to the North West SHA, though part it (Glossop) fell geographically within the East Midlands SHA
- Trafford PCT

==== Lancashire ====
- Blackburn with Darwen PCT
- Blackpool PCT
- Central Lancashire PCT - Formed on 1 October 2006 from the merger of Chorley and South Ribble PCT, Preston PCT, and West Lancashire PCT
- East Lancashire Teaching PCT
- North Lancashire PCT - Formed on 1 October 2006 from the merger of Fylde PCT, Wyre PCT, and half of Morecambe Bay PCT

==== Merseyside ====
- Halton and St Helens PCT
- Liverpool PCT
- Sefton PCT
- Knowsley PCT

=== NHS Yorkshire and the Humber ===
NHS Yorkshire and the Humber SHA was formed in 2006 from the merger of the three former SHAa of West Yorkshire, South Yorkshire, and North and East Yorkshire and Northern Lincolnshire. This SHA contained 15 PCTs organised into 6 clusters.

==== Calderdale, Kirklees and Wakefield ====
- Calderdale PCT
- NHS Kirklees (when created?)
- NHS Wakefield District

==== The Humber ====
- NHS Hull
- North East Lincolnshire Care Trust Plus
- East Riding of Yorkshire
- North Lincolnshire PCT

==== South Yorkshire and Bassetlaw ====
- Barnsley PCT
- Bassetlaw PCT - until 2011 Bassetlaw PCT was under the East Midlands SHA. However, when PCTs were formed into clusters, it was transferred to the South Yorkshire cluster.
- Doncaster PCT (from the merger of Doncaster Central PCT, Doncaster East PCT, Doncaster West PCT on 1 October 2006)
- NHS Rotherham
- NHS Sheffield (from the merger of North Sheffield PCT, Sheffield South West PCT, Sheffield West PCT, Sheffield South East PCT on 1 October 2006)

==== Bradford ====
- Bradford and Airedale Teaching Primary Care Trust

==== Leeds ====
- NHS Leeds

==== North Yorkshire and York ====
- NHS North Yorkshire and York

== NHS Midlands and East ==
This SHA cluster was constituted into three strategic health authorities; NHS East of England, NHS East Midlands, and NHS West Midlands.

=== NHS East Midlands ===
This strategic health authority had responsibility for nine PCTs, arranged into five clusters.

==== Derbyshire County and Derby City ====
- Derby City PCT - Formed from the merger of Central Derby PCT and Greater Derby PCT
- Derbyshire County PCT - Formed on 1 October 2006 from the merger of High Peak and Dales PCT, Erewash PCT, Derbyshire Dales and South Derbyshire PCT, North Eastern Derbyshire PCT, Amber Valley PCT and Chesterfield PCT

==== Leicestershire County and Rutland and Leicestershire City ====
- Leicester City PCT - Formed from the merger of Eastern Leicester PCT and Leicester City West PCT
- Leicestershire County and Rutland PCT - Formed from the merger of Charnwood & North West Leicestershire PCT, Hinckley and Bosworth PCT, Melton, Rutland & Harborough PCT, and South Leicestershire PCT

==== Lincolnshire ====
- NHS Lincolnshire - Formed from the merger of East Lincolnshire PCT, Lincolnshire South West Teaching PCT and West Lincolnshire PCT

==== Northamptonshire and Milton Keynes ====
- Northamptonshire Teaching PCT - Formed from the merger of Daventry and South Northamptonshire PCT, Northampton Teaching PCT and Northamptonshire Heartlands PCT
- Milton Keynes PCT - Became part of the East Midlands SHA in April 2011.

==== Nottinghamshire County and Nottingham City ====
- Nottingham City PCT
- Nottinghamshire County Teaching PCT - Formed from the merger of Ashfield PCT, Broxtowe and Hucknall PCT, Gedling PCT, Mansfield District PCT, Newark and Sherwood PCT, and Rushcliffe PCT [7]

=== East of England ===
The Bedfordshire & Hertfordshire; Norfolk, Suffolk & Cambridgeshire; and Essex strategic health authorities were merged in July 2006 to make the East of England SHA.

==== Hertfordshire ====
- NHS Hertfordshire

==== Bedfordshire and Luton ====
- NHS Luton
- NHS Bedfordshire
- North Essex
- West Essex PCT
- North East Essex PCT
- Mid-Essex PCT

==== South Essex ====
- South East Essex PCT
- South West Essex PCT

==== Cambridgeshire and Peterborough ====
- Cambridgeshire PCT
- Peterborough PCT

==== Norfolk and Waveney ====
- Norfolk PCT
- Great Yarmouth and Waveney PCT

==== Suffolk ====
- Suffolk PCT

=== West Midlands ===
NHS West Midlands (otherwise known as the West Midlands Strategic Health Authority) was formed on 1 July 2006 from Birmingham and the Black Country SHA, Shropshire and Staffordshire SHA, and West Midlands South SHA). It consisted of five PCT clusters.

==== Arden ====
- Coventry Teaching PCT
- Warwickshire PCT - formed on 1 October 2006 following merger of North Warwickshire PCT, Rugby PCT and South Warwickshire PCT)

==== Birmingham and Solihull ====
- NHS Birmingham East and North (also known as Birmingham East and North Primary Care Trust, and formed on 1 October 2006 following merger of Eastern Birmingham PCT and North Birmingham PCT)
- Heart of Birmingham Teaching PCT
- Solihull Care Trust (Solihull Adult Social services joined Solihull PCT to create a new organisation Solihull Care Trust)
- South Birmingham PCT

==== Black Country ====
- Dudley PCT (formed on 1 October 2006 following merger of Dudley Beacon & Castle PCT and Dudley South PCT)
- Sandwell PCT (formed on 1 October 2006 following merger of Oldbury & Smethwick PCT, Rowley Regis & Tipton PCT and Wednesbury & West Bromwich PCT)
- Walsall Teaching PCT
- Wolverhampton City PCT

==== Staffordshire ====
- Stoke-on-Trent PCT
- South Staffordshire PCT
- NHS North Staffordshire (North Staffordshire PCT - formed on 1 October 2006 following merger of Newcastle-under-Lyme PCT and Staffordshire Moorlands PCT)

==== West Mercia ====
- Herefordshire PCT
- NHS Telford and Wrekin (Telford and Wrekin PCT)
- Shropshire County PCT
- Worcestershire PCT (formed on 1 October 2006 following merger of Redditch and Bromsgrove PCT, South Worcestershire PCT and Wyre Forest PCT)

== NHS South of England ==
The NHS South of England SHA comprised South Central, South East Coast and South West strategic health authorities.

=== South Central Strategic Health Authority ===
This SHA consisted of eight PCTs organised into three separate clusters.

==== NHS Berkshire Cluster ====
- NHS Berkshire West
- NHS Berkshire East

==== NHS Southampton, Hampshire, Isle of Wight and Portsmouth ====
- NHS Southampton City
- NHS Hampshire
- NHS Isle of Wight
- NHS Portsmouth

==== NHS Oxfordshire and Buckinghamshire ====
- NHS Buckinghamshire
- NHS Oxfordshire

=== South East Coast ===
==== Kent and Medway ====
- NHS Eastern and Coastal Kent
- NHS West Kent
- NHS Medway

==== Surrey ====
- Surrey PCT

==== Sussex ====
- Brighton and Hove City PCT
- East Sussex Downs and Weald PCT (made by merger of Eastbourne Downs PCT and Sussex Downs and Weald PCT)
- Hastings and Rother PCT (made by merger of Hastings and St Leonards PCT and Bexhill and Rother PCT)
- West Sussex PCT (made by merger of Adur, Arun and Worthing PCT, Western Sussex PCT, Horsham and Chanctonbury PCT, Crawley PCT, and Mid-Sussex PCT)
- Wycombe PCT

=== NHS South West ===
NHS South West (South West SHA) was formed from the merger of Avon, Gloucestershire and Wiltshire SHA, Dorset and Somerset SHA and South West Peninsula SHA. It consisted of 7 PCT clusters containing 14 PCTs.

==== Bath, North East Somerset, Wiltshire ====
- Bath & North East Somerset PCT
- Wiltshire PCT

==== Bournemouth, Poole, Dorset ====
- Dorset PCT
- Bournemouth & Poole Teaching PCT

==== Bristol, North Somerset, South Gloucestershire ====
- Bristol Teaching PCT
- North Somerset PCT
- South Gloucestershire PCT

==== Cornwall and Isles of Scilly ====
- Cornwall & Isles of Scilly PCT

==== Devon, Plymouth, Torbay Care Trust ====
- Devon PCT
- Plymouth Teaching PCT (also known as NHS Plymouth)
- Torbay Care Trust

==== Gloucestershire, Swindon ====
- Gloucestershire PCT
- Swindon PCT

==== Somerset ====
- Somerset PCT

== See also ==
- National Health Service (England)
- NHS trust
- Strategic health authority
- NHS primary care trust
