= Croydon PCT =

NHS primary healthcare trust

Croydon PCT was the primary care trust with responsibility for the London Borough of Croydon, which covered parts of south west London and north Surrey. It was responsible for planning and funding healthcare, and for public health in Croydon. It was accountable to NHS London, the strategic health authority for London.

== Background and legal status ==
It was originally established in 2003 as Croydon Primary Care and Trust by order of the then UK government’s secretary of state for health, John Hutton, using his powers under the National Health Service Act 1977. The trust took over responsibility for the health services in the area from the previously established Croydon Health Authority.

In May 2009 Croydon Primary Care Trust adopted the name of NHS Croydon as it was felt to be more accessible to local communities and better reflected the role of the organisation.

From April 2011 Croydon Primary Care Trust was part of NHS South West London, together with the primary care trusts for Wandsworth, Sutton and Merton, Kingston, and Richmond. Although the five trusts remained separate legal entities, they held joint board meetings and shared a management team. All primary care trusts were abolished on 31 March 2013. The commissioning functions were transferred to a clinical commissioning group, and its public health role to the London Borough of Croydon.

== Key responsibilities ==
NHS Croydon had the stated goal of ‘longer, healthier lives for all the people of Croydon'. It had two key roles:

- Planning and funding health services through local doctors, dentists, pharmacies, voluntary sector agencies and hospitals
- Leading on public health body for the area, promoting health living and preventing the spread of disease.

== Health services in Croydon ==
Croydon is London’s largest borough with a population of 340,000. Croydon has 227 GPs in 64 practices, 156 dentists in 51 practices, 166 pharmacists and 70 optometrists in 28 practices. There is one major NHS trust in Croydon – Croydon Health Services NHS Trust, which provides hospital services at Croydon University Hospital and Purley War Memorial Hospital, and community health services for the borough of Croydon.

Croydon PCT in 2006 launched a "virtual ward" as a pilot program in which patients received hospital-level care in their households. This pilot would lead to widespread adoption across the NHS.

== Financial mismanagement ==
The chief executive and finance director of NHS SW London posted a surplus of £5 million, which was later reported as a medium likelihood of a £22 million additional financial exposure by Ernst and Young who were called in by NHS London. Director of Public Health Dr Peter Brambleby had announced his retirement prior to their arrival. Managers from surrounding PCTs, raised concerns. Brambleby asserted that patient services were affected and blew the whistle to then Secretary of State, Andrew Lansley however the Ernst and Young review found that Dr Brambleby's assertions were without foundation, as reported by the NHS London chair. This is further evidenced in the Croydon PCT Annual Report 2011/12, which demonstrates that the number of invitations for Health Checks had exceeded their target during the period in question.

Peter Brambleby observed a systematic culture of dishonesty and bullying in the NHS, and cited personal experience from other posts, but was not able to provide any verifiable proof that this occurred in Croydon. He also retracted the relevant chapters of his last two annual reports on the grounds that he could no longer trust the finance data on which they depended, he did however issue the second of these reports after the first draft of the Ernst and Young Report and did state within these reports that the finance department showed a greater degree of accuracy and competency than other NHS Finance Departments. His acting successor amended the second report stating "This financial issue is not considered to have materially affected the principal findings of this report or the recommendations arising from them, which have been endorsed by the Clinical Commissioning Group and the Shadow Health and Wellbeing Board."

NHS London on reporting the findings of the Ernst and Young report, stated that no individual was personally to blame for the findings and that the financial exposure uncovered was a systemic issue, this was also stated by Anne Radmore in her evidence to the JHOSC. In September 2012 Ann Radmore, chief executive of NHS South West London, gave evidence to the South West London Joint Health and Overview Scrutiny Committee which whilst reported in local newspapers that officers "consciously" hid NHS Croydon's £23 million deficit, is contrary to the main body of the evidence she had given.

In January 2014 local MP Richard Ottaway said it was scandalous that people in charge of the PCT's accounting at the time have moved on to other jobs in the NHS and are immune from being questioned by a local council joint overview and scrutiny committee. In addition three local councillors also directly involved (PCT Chair, PCT Vice Chair and PCT Chair of the Audit committee) chose not to answer questions by their councillor colleagues on the grounds they as did all other NHS officers provide a full and detailed response to all issues raised in the far wider Ernst and Young Review. Local press coverage indicated that the committee itself had political implications with the chair being of the opposing party to the two main councillors involved.

However, the Secretary of State for Health did indicate that the correct PCT officer was questioned by that committee.

== See also ==
- Healthcare in London
