= Health and Social Care Act 2001 =

Act of the Parliament of the United Kingdom

Health and Social Care Act 2001 (Note: Section 70(1).)
- Act of Parliament
- Parliament of the United Kingdom
- Long title: An Act to amend the law about the national health service; to provide for the exercise of functions by Care Trusts under partnership arrangements under the Health Act 1999 and to make further provision in relation to such arrangements; to make further provision in relation to social care services; to make provision in relation to the supply or other processing of patient information; to extend the categories of appropriate practitioners in relation to prescription-only medicinal products; and for connected purposes.
- Citation: 2001 c. 15
- Introduced by: Alan Milburn; Secretary of State for Health (Commons)
- Territorial extent: England and Wales; Scotland (in part); Northern Ireland (in part); (Note: Section 70(5)–(10).)

Dates
- Royal assent: 27 May 2001
- Commencement: Various (Note: Section 70(2).)
Other legislation
Amends	National Assistance Act 1948; Health Services and Public Health Act 1968; Medicines Act 1968; House of Commons Disqualification Act 1975; Patents Act 1977; Health Services Act 1980; Mental Health Act 1983; Disabled Persons (Services, Consultation and Representation) Act 1986; Health and Medicines Act 1988; Children Act 1989; National Health Service and Community Care Act 1990; Social Security Contributions and Benefits Act 1992
Amended by	National Health Service Reform and Health Care Professions Act 2002; Health and Social Care (Community Health and Standards) Act 2003; Serious Organised Crime and Police Act 2005; National Health Service (Consequential Provisions) Act 2006; Health and Social Care Act 2008; Transfer of Tribunal Functions Order 2010; Care Act 2014 and Children and Families Act 2014 (Consequential Amendments) Order 2015; Social Services and Well-being (Wales) Act 2014 (Consequential Amendments) Regulations 2016

Status: Amended

Text of statute as originally enacted

Revised text of statute as amended

The Health and Social Care Act 2001 (c. 15) is an act of the Parliament of the United Kingdom. It represented the Labour Party's turn towards the private health sector after decades of anti-privatisation rhetoric.

== Background ==
During 1997–2001, Labour had begun to "modernise" the National Health Service, by increasing investment and bringing the spending on health into line with peer European countries and had begun to reduce certain "marketisation" aspects.

Increasingly, many patients had begun to use private providers for healthcare, and for the 2001 general election, Labour decided that to prevent a 'sleepwaking to a US-style health-care system', patients would be able to access private health care through the NHS.

In August 2000, the Labour government announced the NHS Plan 2000, then known as the "NHS Plan", which was described as the "biggest shake up of the NHS since it was established in 1948". The plan was described in an opinion piece for the British Medical Journal as "As good as it gets—make the most of it"

In November 2000, Alan Milburn signed a concordat with the private sector, a reversal of the dismantling of the marketisation policies under Frank Dobson.

== Details ==
In 2003, provisions of the law abolished community health councils in England, which was controversial among Labour MPs, on the basis that they would be replaced by 'local patient advocacy groups'. These local groups were formed in April 2008, as patient and public involvement forums. The guidance for these organisations was delivered to councils in 2003.

The act provided for primary care trusts (PCTs) and NHS trusts to be designated as care trusts in cases where they had local authority health-related functions delegated to them by agreement. These primary care trusts took over the functions of health authorities, which were abolished under the National Health Service Reform and Health Care Professions Act 2002. Social care in England was reorganised to be structured into these trusts which would pool their services – this was the first time that health and social care were integrated at the local level since the National Insurance Act 1970.

== See also ==
- National Health Service Reform and Health Care Professions Act 2002
- Health and Social Care (Community Health and Standards) Act 2003
- NHS Plan 2000
