= Blackburn with Darwen Teaching Primary Care Trust =

Coordinates: 53°43′48″N 2°26′40″W

- Blackburn with Darwen Primary Care Trust headquarters in Guide, Blackburn
- Type: Primary care trust
- Location: Blackburn, Lancashire, BB1 2QH
- Region served: North West
- Chair: Nick Kennedy
- Chief Executive: Neil Matthewman
- Affiliations: National Health Service
- Budget: £16million (Last annual budget for 2006–2007)
- Staff: 916 (as of 2006)
- Website: Trust official website

Location of Blackburn with Darwen tPCT at grid reference SD7068 in the United Kingdom

Blackburn with Darwen tPCT was an English National Health Service primary care trust, responsible for commissioning & purchasing of health care in Blackburn with Darwen in Lancashire. It came under the North West of England's NHS strategic health authority (SHA). It was abolished in April 2013.

== History ==
Blackburn with Darwen PCT was formed in 2000 by order of the Secretary of State for Health Alan Milburn by means of the National Health Service Act 1977, and is co-terminus with Blackburn with Darwen Borough Council. It became a teaching PCT in 2007, having survived a series of mergers intact.

Between 1982 and 1994 the local healthcare fundholders for this area was known as the Blackburn, Hyndburn and Ribble Valley District Health Authority, which came under the Lancashire Area Health Authority (which has now been replaced by the North West Region SHA). It was then reorganised into part of the East Lancashire District Health Authority. Under this administration, the function of fundholders was known as the Blackburn with Darwen primary care group sub committee, before being replaced yet again by the creation of the present trust in 2000.

== Responsibilities ==
The PCT served a population of approximately 163,000 people and, according to its 2007-2007 annual report, had three core responsibilities:

- Engaging with its local population to improve health and well-being.
- To collaborate with GP's to commission a comprehensive equitable range of high quality, responsive and efficient within allocated resources.
- To directly provide high quality, responsive and efficient services where this gives the best value.

=== Geographical spread ===
The Trust was responsible for the commissioning of healthcare on all of the following sites:

1. Audley Health Centre: Longton Close, Blackburn, Lancashire, BB1 1XA
2. Bangor Street Health Centre: Bangor Street, Blackburn, Lancashire, BB1 6DY
3. Bentham Road Health Centre: Bentham Road, Blackburn, Lancashire, BB2 4QD
4. Cherry Tree (Livesey Clinic): Cherry Tree Lane, Blackburn, Lancashire, BB2 5NX
5. Darwen Health Centre: James Street West, Darwen, Lancashire, BB3 1PY
6. Glenfield Business Park: Unit 250, Blakewater Road, Blackburn, Lancashire, BB1 5QH
7. Jarman Centre: 53 James Street, Blackburn, Lancashire, BB1 6BE
8. Larkhill Health Centre: Mount Pleasant, Blackburn, Lancashire, BB1 5BJ
9. Little Harwood Health Centre: Plane Tree Road, Blackburn, Lancashire, BB1 6PH
10. Mellor Clinic: St. Marys Gardens, Mellor, Blackburn, Lancashire, BB2 7JW
11. Montague Health Centre: Oakenhurst Road, Blackburn, Lancashire, BB2 1PP
12. Primary Care Centre: Queens Park Hospital, Haslingden Road, Blackburn, Lancashire, BB2 3HH
13. Roman Road Health Centre: Fishmoor Drive, Blackburn, Lancashire, BB2 3UY
14. Royal Blackburn Hospital: Haslingden Road, Blackburn, Lancashire, BB2 3HH
15. Sentinel Court: Sentinel Court, Wilkinson Way, Blackburn, Lancashire, BB1 2EH
16. St Ives House: Accrington Road, Blackburn, Lancashire, BB1 2EG

Source: Department of Health. NHS Choices: Blackburn With Darwen PCT

== Public Health Strategy ==
The Blackburn with Darwen area suffers from severe health inequalities., in particular there have been reports of an increase in cases of rickets in the area. In response to this the Living Better, Living Longer strategy was launched in 2007. The purpose of the strategy is to:

- Encourage the Trust, its partners and the population of Blackburn with Darwen to do what it can to live better and longer lives
- To identify what needs to happen with an implementation plan that will make a positive impact on the health and well-being of the Blackburn with Darwen population.

This is accomplished by a process called commissioning. This is defined as: The strategic activity of assessing needs, resources and current services, and developing a strategy to make best use of available resources to meet identified needs.

Once this has been completed, the actual purchasing of health services needed to meet the needs and priorities identified can go a head. The definition used for purchasing is: The operational activity set within the context of commissioning, of applying resources to buy services to meet needs, either at a macro/population level or at a micro/individual level.

== Monitoring and Assessment of Services ==
The PCT is also responsible for monitoring and assessment of these services whilst they are being provided to ensure that the service providers are adhering to the plan laid out, to the agreed standards of care and are providing value for money.
