= Ukactive =

Not-for-profit industry association

ukactive
- Founded: 1991; 35 years ago
- Type: Non-profit
- Headquarters: London, UK
- Region served: United Kingdom
- Fields: Fitness
- Key people: Mike Farrar (Chair); Dame Carol Black (Non-executive director); Huw Edwards (CEO)
- Website: www.ukactive.com

ukactive is a not-for-profit industry association, promoting the interests of commercial fitness gyms and community leisure centres, with more than 3500 organisations in membership. ukactive's central stated vision is to get more people, more active, more often and to improve the nation's health by promoting active lifestyles. It originated as the Fitness Industry Association (FIA), which was founded in 1991.

== History ==
ukactive originated as the Fitness Industry Association (FIA), which was founded in 1991 as a trade organisation for the fitness sector. Its stated aims were "to promote a healthier and more physically active nation through raising standards within the health and fitness industry". The FIA organised an annual 'Commit to get fit' campaign that raised awareness to member organisations to take part and to also raise money for charity, while the FIA's links with the NHS gave it added credibility.

In April 2011, David Stalker was appointed as the new chief executive officer of the FIA, having served as 'Executive Director' since 2009. He replaced Andree Deane. Stalker oversaw the rebranding of the FIA into ukactive at the 2012 ukactive Summit, developing the organisation into a sector representative health body that champions the cause of physical activity, health and wellbeing. David Stalker left in 2015, and is now running Oxygen Freejumping.

== Organisation and governance ==
ukactive's chief executive officer is Huw Edwards, who was appointed to the role in 2019. Mike Farrar is currently ukactive's chair. Farrar was the former Chief Executive of the NHS Confederation from 2011 until October 2013.

The other current members of the ukactive Board are:

- Dame Carol Black, Advisor to Government, NHS England and Public Health England
- Adrian Packer, CEO of CORE Education Trust
- Dr Peter Bonfield, CEO of the Building Research Establishment
- Sarah Kendall, Head of PR and Communications at Fuse Sport + Entertainment
- Phil Rumbelow, CEO of the Jubilee Hall Trust and ukactive Membership Council Chair
- Matt Merrick, Elected Member, former COO of Virgin Active
- Mark Sesnan, Elected Member and managing director of Greenwich Leisure Limited
- Sandra Dodd, Board Treasurer and CEO of Places for People Leisure

ukactive governance also includes several sub-committees, who represent the various facets of the organisation's landscape in an advisory role to the main board. These include:

- Membership Council- the formal voice of the membership base in ukactive governance, reporting to the Board, and taking on challenging topics of substance for the sector.
- Suppliers Council- Put in place in 2015 to handle the key issues that matter to members and act as a representative mouthpiece for the huge number and vast array of suppliers across the sector.
- Kids Board- the main voice within the membership base for children's activity providers.
- Standards and Legislation committee- promoting best practice in the industry, put in place to feed into ukactive's Code of Practice.

Andrew Lansley is an adviser. Current partners include Sport England, Argos, DHL, Coca-Cola, Essex County Council, Legal & General and the National Childbirth Trust.

== Policy and research ==
=== Research ===
The Research Institute aims to bridge the evidence gap between traditional laboratory-based 'exercise is medicine' research and real world interventions.

The core aim of the research team is to generate academic publications and conduct research which will contribute to answering fundamental questions related to how to get 'more people, more active, more often'.

Promising Practice 2 is a project conducted by the ukactive Research Institute. In collaboration with the National Centre for Sport and Exercise Medicine and Public Health England, it is seeking to identify physical activity programmes that demonstrate good and promising practice in local communities, through surveys. This is the second iteration of the Promising Practice project; In July 2014, a total of 952 survey responses were submitted for phase one of the project.

Turning the Tide was a 2013 report that sought to measure and highlight the rising levels of physical inactivity in the UK. It found that one in four people in England fail to achieve more than 30 minutes’ moderate physical activity over 28 days, yet local authorities spent just 2.4 per cent of public health budgets on inactivity. The release of this report was welcomed by David Cameron who was quoted in the report saying "Turning the tide of inactivity is essential to the health of our nation" MP Andy Burnham also advocated the report at the ukactive National Summit 2014. It led to a doubling on local authority public health spending on England's 'inactivity epidemic', and also preceded the launch of 'Move More, Live More', a Government commitment to reduce the nation's physical inactivity levels. The report saw ukactive awarded 'Trade Body Campaign of the Year' at the Public Affairs Awards 2014.

Generation Inactive, published in 2015, established the scale of childhood physical inactivity in the UK. It explored the current understanding of children's physical activity in primary schools and investigated the measures that are used to track the activity and fitness levels of pupils, finding that just 40% of schools accurately tracked their pupils' fitness levels. It offered several recommendations to government, schools and the activity sector in how to reverse the trend of physical inactivity in young people.

The Rise of the Activity Sector was released in October 2016, and was the first report to analyse and estimate the value of the activity sector as a whole, based on analyses made by valuation specialist Mazars and sponsorship experts Nielsen Sports. It estimated that the gym sector would be worth £7.7 billion by the end of 2016, representing year-on-year growth of 17 per cent.

Blueprint for an Active Britain was released in November 2015 and set out the key changes required in Britain's physical activity landscape to inspire a more active nation. The recommendations and ideas in the report presented a system-wide roadmap for promoting physical activity for everyone, and a partnership approach to prevent the debilitating spread of physical inactivity. It was supported by Lord Ara Darzi, the Royal College of General Practitioners, the Royal Society for Public Health, the Nuffield Trust, Mind and Age UK. Many of these ideas have been incorporated into the Government's own policy paper: Sporting Future – A New Strategy for an Active Nation, as well as Sport England's subsequent strategy Towards an Active Nation. The follow-up to this report was the November 2016 Blueprint for an Active Britain: Milestone Review, which analysed the progress made in the post-Blueprint landscape. It outlined fresh, practical policy recommendations across a range of areas that Government and other key stakeholders including ukactive should work towards in the future.

The organisation is actively involved with local authorities in the United Kingdom in developing plans to increase physical activity.

=== Public affairs ===
ukactive's Public Affairs department engages with central government, including parliamentarians and ministers to highlight the importance of the physical activity agenda.

Major policy recommendations led by the ukactive Public Affairs department include:

- November 2015: November 2015: Every GP surgery should have access to a trained physical activity professional who can help patients work on their fitness to improve their cardio-respiratory and mental health.
- January 2016: Baroness Grey-Thompson appealed to employers to treat provision of physical activity throughout the working day 'with the same importance as annual and sick leave', to achieve a much-needed culture shift in office life; suggesting more employers should incorporate activity plans, corporate gym memberships and sit-stand desks.
- March 2016: Crucial that the extra funding from the sugar levy be put to use to tackle the childhood inactivity crisis and focus on ensuring that every child in the UK has the opportunity for an active start to life.
- November 2016: Baroness Grey-Thompson called for a £1bn regeneration scheme to save the NHS by transforming the UK's ageing fleet of leisure centres into its new preventative frontline.

== Programmes and events ==
=== Programmes ===
- Future Leaders is an annual leadership programme delivered by ukactive and IESE, consisting of a week-long intense training course at the IESE Business School in Barcelona and a subsequent support and alumni service. It is offered to give up-and-coming professionals in the physical activity industry the chance to further their careers with a week-long leadership programme.
- Let's Get Moving is a physical activity care pathway originally developed by the Department of Health, validated by Loughborough University and recommended by the National Institute for Health and Clinical Excellence. ukactive has developed its own version of the behaviour change intervention, as part of its ambition to have an exercise professional in every GP's surgery. Let's Get Moving supports inactive patients to set realistic and achievable personal physical activity goals, and is backed by funding and support from Sport England.

=== Events ===
- National Fitness Day is an annual campaign that has run since 2011. It represents the most active day of the year and is underpinned by mass participation events and celebration of all things physical activity across the UK. ukactive works with its physical activity sector network to offer free taster classes to the public, as well as other promotions and celebrations. National Fitness Day 2016, which saw ukactive partner with Argos, featured 18,000 events across the UK, with more than 1,000,000 participants.
- ukactive National Summit is the leading political event for the physical activity sector, taking place annually. In 2016, National Summit speakers included Head of NHS England Simon Stevens, The Doctor Who Gave up Drugs Chris van Tulleken, former Chief knowledge officer of the NHS Professor Muir Gray, Paralympian Sarah Storey and CEO of Sport England Jennie Price.
- Flame Awards recognise facilities, suppliers, operators, educational institutes, health practitioners and large corporations that have demonstrated exceptional standards. Award categories include 'Physical Activity Campaign of the Year', 'Active Workplace of the Year', Supplier of the Year and Workplace Wellbeing.
- Active Training Awards and Conference is the final annual ukactive-run event of the calendar year. The awards recognise the organisations and individuals who are leading the way in skills and workforce development.

== Music licensing ==
Phonographic Performance Ltd is the UK-based music licensing company which grants copyright licenses for the public performance of recorded music. Over a four-year period ukactive has negotiated, and continues to negotiate to prevent large increases to PPL licensing as seen in other nations.
