= NHS South East Coast =

NHS South East Coast was a strategic health authority of the National Health Service in England. It operated in the South East region, along with NHS South Central, providing coterminosity with the local government office region.

== History ==
NHS South East Coast was established on 1 July 2006 as one of 10 Strategic Health Authorities (SHAs) in England.

== Organisation ==
NHS South East Coast contained 26 NHS organisations, including 6 Foundation Trusts. These comprise: eight Primary Care Trusts; thirteen NHS Acute Trusts (hospitals); four Mental Health or Specialist Trusts; and one Ambulance Trust.

=== Primary care trusts ===
Primary care trusts were abolished in April 2013.

1. Brighton and Hove City PCT
2. East Sussex Downs and Weald PCT
3. Eastern and Coastal Kent PCT
4. Hastings and Rother PCT
5. Medway PCT
6. Surrey PCT
7. West Kent PCT
8. West Sussex PCT

=== Acute and foundation trusts ===
- Ashford and St Peter's Hospitals NHS Trust
- Brighton and Sussex University Hospitals NHS Trust
- Dartford and Gravesham NHS Trust
- East Kent Hospitals University NHS Foundation Trust
- East Sussex Hospitals NHS Trust
- Frimley Park NHS Foundation Trust
- Maidstone and Tunbridge Wells NHS Trust
- The Medway NHS Foundation Trust
- Royal Surrey County Hospital NHS Trust
- Royal West Sussex NHS Trust
- Surrey and Sussex Healthcare NHS Trust
- The Queen Victoria Hospital NHS Foundation Trust
- Worthing and Southlands Hospitals NHS Trust
