= National Health Service Reform and Health Care Professions Act 2002 =

Act of the Parliament of the United Kingdom

National Health Service Reform and Health Care Professions Act 2002 (Note: Section 42(1).)
- Act of Parliament
- Parliament of the United Kingdom
- Long title: An Act to amend the law about the national health service; to establish and make provision in connection with a Commission for Patient and Public Involvement in Health; to make provision in relation to arrangements for joint working between NHS bodies and the prison service, and between NHS bodies and local authorities in Wales; to make provision in connection with the regulation of health care professions; and for connected purposes.
- Citation: 2002 c. 17
- Introduced by: Secretary of State for Health, Alan Milburn (Commons)
- Territorial extent: England and Wales; Scotland (in part); Northern Ireland (in part); (Note: Section 42(5)–(8).)

Dates
- Royal assent: 25 June 2002
- Commencement: Various (Note: Section 42(2)–(4).)
Other legislation
Amends	Employers' Liability (Compulsory Insurance) Act 1969; Dentists Act 1984; Health Service Commissioners Act 1993; Value Added Tax Act 1994; Government of Wales Act 1998; Health and Social Care Act 2001
Amended by	National Health Service (Consequential Provisions) Act 2006; Mental Health Act 2007

Status: Amended

Text of statute as originally enacted

Revised text of statute as amended

The National Health Service Reform and Health Care Professions Act 2002 (c. 17) is an act of the Parliament of the United Kingdom that reorganised the administration of the National Health Service in England and Wales.

The act abolished the 95 health authorities which has been created under the Health Authorities Act 1995, moving most of their functions to primary care trusts (PCTs), and creating 28 new strategic health authorities (SHAs).

== Background ==
The act put into effect the recommendations of the Bristol Inquiry and government proposals in the 2001 document Shifting the balance of power within the NHS.

== Effects ==
The act required the Secretary of State for Health to establish strategic health authorities (SHAs) and primary care trusts (PCTs) to cover all areas in England. It also strengthened the independence of the Commission for Health Improvement (CHI), which had been created under the Health Act 1999.

The act created an independent Patient and Public Involvement Forum (PPIF) for each PCT and NHS trust. The duty to involve the public had been enshrined in the Health and Social Care Act 2001. The PPIFs replaced the community health councils created in 1974. The PPIFs worked to standards set by the Commission for Patient and Public Involvement in Health (CPPIH). Unlike the abolished community health councils, the remit of PPIFs included primary care. However, social care services were not included.

The act created a new Council for the Regulation of Health Care Professionals (renamed the Council for Healthcare Regulatory Excellence (CHRE) in September 2004) to oversee the different regulatory bodies of the healthcare professions.

== Subsequent reorganisations ==
The CPPIH, set up in January 2003, had existed for less than a year before a decision was taken to abolish it in July 2004. Following five reviews of the date of abolition and after the enactment of the Local Government and Public Involvement in Health Act 2008, the CPPIH finally ceased to exercise its statutory functions in March 2008.

The SHAs were reduced in number from 28 to 10 in on 1 July 2006, and both SHAs and PCTs were abolished entirely under the Health and Social Care Act 2012. The 2012 Act also renamed the Council for Healthcare Regulatory Excellence as the Professional Standards Authority.
