= Medical indemnity in Australia =

In Australia, it is a mandatory requirement for registered healthcare practitioners to hold appropriate medical indemnity insurance coverage for healthcare practices in Australia. Medical indemnity is a form of professional indemnity coverage defined by Australian legislation – the Medical Indemnity (Prudential Supervision and Product Standards) Act 2003 and is a type of general insurance (see Insurance in Australia). In the United Kingdom, this type of professional indemnity for healthcare practitioners is generally referred to as ‘professional indemnity’ and in the United States, medical negligence insurance. In Australia, the term medical indemnity can be used to refer to all healthcare indemnity (e.g. dental, allied health, medical), not just that provided for medical doctors. However, there are only six Australian Health Practitioner Regulation Authority (AHPRA) listed insurers that provide medical indemnity insurance cover to medical practitioners.

Australian medical practitioner medical indemnity providers include:

- Avant
- Berkshire Hathaway Specialty Insurance Company (distributed by Tego Insurance) (underwritten by Lloyd's of London)
- Guild Insurance Limited
- MDA National
- Medical Indemnity Protection Society Limited (MIPS)
- Medical Insurance Group (MIGA)

Industry bodies include the Insurance Council of Australia and the Medical Indemnity Industry Association of Australia.

Australian medical students are provided with a limited free membership to any medical indemnity provider. On commencement as a doctor and during vocational training, a heavily discounted membership provides wide access to work-related legal support through the indemnity provider. Once a training doctor has completed medical speciality training, the annual premium increases, and based on the individuals income from their medical practice. Doctors who practice wholly in public hospitals or non-clinical academics are provided with indemnity from their employer. However, it is advisable to hold a policy with a medical indemnity provider for that extra layer of protection and access to support when needed. For example, a public hospital doctor who may have conflict with their employer, will be able to seek legal support from their indemnity provider.

== Background of medical indemnity in Australia ==
Following the UK model from the late nineteenth century, Australian doctors have protected themselves through establishing state-based mutual organizations collectively called Medical Defense Organizations (MDOs). These medical defense organizations traditionally provided discretionary coverage, rather than coverage under a contract of insurance.
On 31 May 2002, the Australian Government announced a strategy to improve transparency in the medical indemnity industry, make medical indemnity a viable commercial product and bring medical defense organizations (MDOs) away from discretionary coverage and into the fold of all insurance under the prudential framework. This strategy was brought about because of the medical indemnity crisis of 2002.

== Medical indemnity crisis of 2002 ==
In April 2002, Australia's largest medical indemnity insurer, United Medical Protection (UMP), entered voluntary administration with unfunded group liabilities of $455 million. The Australian Government responded by providing an initial capital guarantee of $35 million until 30 June 2002, but by November 2003 this had become a comprehensive support package.

=== Background to the crisis ===
MDO's traditionally offered occurrence-based discretionary coverage. That meant that at the discretion of the Board, a member would be granted assistance for claims arising from incidents that occurred while they were a member. This type of coverage is the protection of choice for the majority of UK health practitioners.
Most MDOs did not fully fund the projected incurred but not yet reported (IBNR) claims liabilities that are consequent upon providing occurrence-based coverage. The often fierce competition between MDOs and commercial insurers also inhibited the drive for appropriate IBNR funding.

As a consequence of changes in accounting standards, some indemnity providers were found to be at risk of not being able to meet future liabilities.

In the years leading up to the crisis, there was a significant increase in all types of liability claims including medical indemnity claims. The cost of medical indemnity coverage for doctors increased rapidly, especially for those doctors performing high-risk procedures. The widespread indemnity crisis forced some public events to be canceled and surgeries to be postponed. The Increased cost of insurance premiums adversely affected many voluntary organizations and small businesses.
MDOs responded by calling on their members for additional funds, and/or moving to offer claims-made coverage to help correct historic underfunding of incurred but not reported liabilities (IBNRs).

=== Collapse and bailout ===
Australia's largest insurer HIH collapsed and MDOs' exposure to HIH through insurance and reinsurance programs compounded the funding crisis. The most significant exposure was with UMP, which at the time had an estimated $450 million in outstanding incurred but not reported claims.
State-based tort reform to address the liability crisis also led to significant claims spikes.

The Australian Prudential Regulation Authority (APRA) ordered that all medical indemnity providers meet the minimum capital requirement. By 2002 the majority of MDOs had taken measures to improve their funding however the financial situation of Australian Medical Insurance Limited (AMIL) the insurance subsidiary of UMP had deteriorated and early in 2002 APRA required that AMIL increase its capital. In April AMIL advised that it would not be able to meet the cost of claims and the company applied for the appointment of a provisional liquidator.

Then-president of the Australian Medical Association, Kerryn Phelps, said "If UMP falls over today, 90 percent of NSW doctors couldn't go to work tomorrow. It's nothing short of a major crisis."
To ensure ongoing medical services the Federal Government negotiated with the Australian Medical Association and in October 2002 there was a Government guarantee given to UMP which enabled them to resume business.

The justification for the bail-out package was that UMP was too important rather than too large – notably, the Australian Government did not bail out HIH which collapsed at a similar time but was a much larger enterprise.

=== Reform during the crisis ===
Further Federal Government initiatives were implemented through the Medical Indemnity Act of 2002 and Medical Indemnity (Prudential Supervision and Products Standards) Act of 2003. These included:

- Run-off Cover Scheme (ROCS)
- Exceptional Claims Scheme
- Premium Support Scheme (PSS)
- High Cost Claims Scheme (HCCS)
- UMP Support Payment liability contributions
- IBNR Guarantees

== Medical indemnity legislation and legal reform ==
The Medical Indemnity reforms created several changes for medical indemnity in Australia. Importantly all medical indemnity coverage now had to be provided as insurance; only by Australian authorized insurers; and the cover offered changed from claims-incurred to claims-made insurance. This provided a better way for insurers to estimate liabilities, hence, stabilize the industry.

== Medical indemnity today ==
Medical Indemnity in Australia stabilized following the introduction of the Federal Government initiatives Tort reforms and better than predicted run-off of IBNR claims liabilities. In a report from the Australian Government just three years after UMP received a bailout package from the Government, the industry was described as healthy:

“In March 2005, it is clear that the total of all the initiatives introduced by both state and federal governments, the oversight of the regulators, APRA and the Australian Competition & Consumer Commission (ACCC) and, most importantly, by the medical indemnity industry itself, has brought the industry back to a state of health surprisingly quickly. All the insurers have reached — or are well on the way to reaching — the capital APRA requires. Tort law reform seems to have had a significant effect in reining in the previous trends to ever-escalating claims. There is a strong spirit of both cooperation and healthy competition in the industry”.
