= Peter Brambleby =

English public health doctor

Peter Brambleby is an English Public Health doctor. From 1996 he was director of public health for Norwich Primary Care Trust. In 2003 he received requests from senior clinicians at the Norfolk and Norwich Hospital to look into their concerns about changes to the design and build of the new Private Finance Initiative hospital that they believed put patients at risk. He was later warned by the press officer at the strategic health authority that unless he dropped the whole matter he would end up “like Dr. David Kelly who was found dead in the woods with his wrist slashed.”

He was the Director of Public Health in Croydon from March 2010 to 29 February 2012 he announced his retirement in September 2011. On hearing of the results of the Ernst and Young review in July 2012 of the PCTs finances he wrote a letter to Andrew Lansley. He complained that patients in Croydon known to be at high risk of stroke or heart disease were no longer invited to screenings, however, the annual report for Croydon PCT 2011/12 provided clear evidence that this screening programme exceeded the targets previously agreed by the PCT board (CPCT Board Paper March 2011) as per the original plan submitted by Peter Brambleby.

Brambleby was, and is, an enthusiastic supporter of clinical commissioning with a particular interest in a health economics approach called “programme budgeting”. This is a way of relating costs to outcomes grouped by health programmes such as heart health, bone health, mental health and so on, rather than the traditional breakdown by hospitals, GPs and community services.
