= Hospital-at-home =

Healthcare delivery model

Hospital-at-home (HAH, known by various other names such as home hospital and virtual wards) is a healthcare model characterized by delivery of inpatient level health services at a residence rather than the traditional setting of a licensed health facility.

Though at-home health services have previously existed in forms such as house calls and home care, delivery of acute inpatient care in this setting only gained footing in the late 20th century, accelerating significantly with the onset of the COVID-19 pandemic in the 2020s and the expansion of telehealth capabilities.

== Motives ==
Primary motives for implementation of HAH services include benefits to patient recovery, lower costs, and hospital capacity; The last became a major driver for a spike in these programs in the early 2020s with widespread hospital and emergency department overcrowding resulting from the COVID pandemic.

== Operation ==
HAH programs vary widely between regions and organizations. While some hospital systems run programs largely in-house, others utilize contractors such as specialty home care companies and ambulance services.

Patients are visited at least daily by a registered nurse or physician. If a physician does not see them in-person, they will meet regularly via telehealth. Outside of regular visits, patients have routes to immediately connect with program staff to request assistance, and emergency services are available for dispatch in case a patient requires emergent care or requires transfer to the hospital for care not available in an HAH setting. As patients are left without on-site staff for most of their admission, they are equipped with remote monitoring equipment allowing their vital signs to be constantly monitored for changes which may require intervention.

== Limitations and risks ==
Eligibility to HAH programs is significantly restricted due to the absence of 24/7 in-person medical staff. Patients must be evaluated for associated risks, such as intensity of care and level of dependence. Studies reflect challenges with ensuring patients and caregivers provide the correct medications at the right doses and times. Programs must also consider the amount of work required by the patient and their family to manage their care between visits.

== By country ==
=== Australia ===
HAH programs exist in Australia, largely known as "hospital in the home."

=== Ireland ===
In the late 2010s, a virtual hospital program was introduced on the remote Clare Island off the coast of Ireland by physician Derek O'Keeffe. The program equips patients with monitoring devices to anticipate flares of chronic conditions with the hope of addressing them remotely and preventing unnecessary or avoidable travel to the mainland for the island's small population. O'Keeffe later expanded this program into the Clare Island Home Health Project, with hopes to expand into other remote areas of the country.

=== Saudi Arabia ===
Seha Virtual Hospital, based in Saudi Arabia's capital city of Riyadh, is an HAH program established by the Ministry of Health in 2022 and recognized by the Guinness Book of World Records as the largest virtual hospital in the world. As of early 2025, Seha was associated with 224 traditional hospitals across the kingdom.

=== Singapore ===
A study conducted in 2020 and published in 2021 in Singapore which surveyed patients at two National University Health System (NUHS) hospitals, National University Hospital and Alexandra Hospital, found broad interest in the concept of a hospital-at-home program. NUHS soon implemented their own program, NUHS@Home.

=== Spain ===
Hospital Clínic de Barcelona operates a Hospital at Home program serving the Catalonia region of Spain, which they state began in the 1990s. A 2024 study found that the program, which estimated that the program served 2,500 patients per year, discharged patients an average of three days earlier, saving 1,551 bed-days over traditional hospitalization.

=== United Kingdom ===
Hospital-at-home services are officially referred to by the United Kingdom's National Health Service (NHS) as "virtual wards."

==== Background ====
In May 2006, the Croydon Primary Care Trust launched its virtual ward as a pilot program, pioneered by NHS public health registrar Doctor Geraint Lewis. Successes from Croydon's program lent support for similar programs elsewhere, and over the next decade, virtual wards were created across the UK under the authority of the NHS.

The expansion of these programs accelerated during the COVID-19 pandemic, with specialized "Covid-19 virtual wards" being introduced to prevent additional in-hospital admissions.

A study of West Hertfordshire Teaching Hospitals NHS Trust’s Virtual Hospital found that it significantly reduced the time patients spent receiving acute treatment. The costs averaged £118.49 per bed day, compared with £569 for inpatient hospital care. 95.8% of the patients preferred Virtual Hospital care, and 98.3% said they felt safe while being treated at home.

=== United States ===
In the United States, since 2020, hospital-at-home services have been sanctioned at the federal level by the Centers for Medicare and Medicaid Services (CMS) as the Acute Hospital Care at Home (AHCAH) initiative.

==== Background ====
Johns Hopkins School of Medicine is largely recognized as a forerunner to modern HAH in the US. Doctor John Burton, in partnership with Doctor Donna Regenstreif of the John A. Hartford Foundation, conceived the idea of "Home Hospital" in 1995 as a way to better treat elderly patients in their own homes.

Despite the purported success of multiple trial programs over the coming years, the inability to bill insurers for these admissions prevented widespread adoption.

The Acute Hospital Care at Home initiative was enacted by the Centers for Medicare and Medicaid Services in November 2020 as an extension of its "Hospital Without Walls" program initiated earlier in the year, which itself aimed to provide funding for a range of telehealth and other services in response to the government's COVID public health emergency (PHE) declaration. These programs were intended to be a temporary measure to address hospital overcrowding caused by the pandemic. Because health providers are generally required to follow CMS's Conditions of Participation to be eligible for Medicare reimbursement, CMS implemented the AHCAH initiative to provide hospitals and health systems with waivers to certain of these conditions such as 24/7 on-site nursing availability and specifications for sites of care. Exemption from these rules allowed patients to remain admitted in HAH programs without constant nursing presence and in home settings which do not meet the building and fire code regulations which brick-and-mortar hospitals are subject to. When applying for this waiver, hospitals are required to demonstrate their program's ability to meet other standards to ensure quality of care and patient safety. Despite the initiative being a temporary measure, the reported success of these programs led to calls for an extension beyond the expected termination of the public health emergency in May 2023. Following successful lobbying, Congress included in the Consolidated Appropriations Act of 2023 an extension which authorized the program through the end of 2024.

From its inception, AHCAH reauthorization has been attached to these government appropriations bills. Because of this, reimbursement for hospitals' programs has been subject to suspension during multiple government shutdowns, including for almost two months in 2015. These lapses in reimbursement lead to many hospitals pausing or ceasing their programs, either discharging their patients or transferring them back to physical hospitals. In February 2026, AHCAH waivers were extended for five years to September 2030 as part of the Consolidated Appropriations Act of 2026, which also ordered further study into the program.

==== Rules ====
While CMS waivers exempt hospitals from several requirements of hospital care, certain other standards are required to be met, such as:

- Screening for appropriateness, including medical conditions, working utilities at the home, and risk of domestic violence
- Patient consent
- Admission from brick-and-mortar setting, specifically from inpatient or emergency department, following an evaluation from a physician
- Provision of specific services such as diagnostics, transportation, care coordination, respiratory care, and physical therapy
- Provision of equipment such as oxygen and oxygen delivery devices, food, pharmaceuticals, and durable medical equipment (DME)
- Two in-person visits per day – at least one visit must be with a registered nurse, while others may be with a nurse or paramedic
- On-demand remote connection with a staff member who can connect with a physician or nurse if needed
- Tracking and reporting of statistics such as patient volumes, mortality rates, and readmission rates

== Studies ==
In 1999, Johns Hopkins University released a study of its 1996-1998 Home Hospital (HH) pilot program. Their program was restricted to Medicare beneficiaries over the age of 65 within their catchment area with conditions such as heart failure, pneumonia, and cellulitis. Though the study group was limited (seventeen patients enrolled in the HH program), they found that the model presented several benefits: The cost of home hospital care was 53–60% compared to in-hospital care of similar patients, outcomes were equal or better, and patient satisfaction was higher. They recommended larger trial studies, anticipating that the model could be sustainable when run by medical centers and managed care organizations and save hundreds of millions of dollars in national healthcare expenditures.

A study conducted by the VA Boston Healthcare System in 2023 of their Hospital-in-Home trial found that the model led to cost savings of 52% over care in a brick-and-mortar setting, in addition to lowering rates of complications.

== Criticism ==
National Nurses United (NNU), a US nursing union, has raised concern that HAH programs are inherently unsafe due to the lack of 24/7 on-site medical staff and will contribute to the ongoing trend of hospital closures and decreasing national bed counts. The organization further contends that this puts a heavier burden on the patient and their family and other caregivers who have to perform tasks that would otherwise fall on more highly trained hospital staff. NNU has accused hospitals of using HAH to cut costs at the expense of patient safety. Criticizing health system Kaiser Permanente's "advanced care at home" program, NNA stated in a 2021 press release:

The core motivation has never been to improve patient care. Kaiser, as well as other hospital systems across the country experimenting with these models, believes it has seized onto the revelatory idea that it can shift these overhead costs onto the patient by sending them home. This model will prove to be a gold mine for Kaiser and the rest of the hospital industry, as long as payers such as the Centers for Medicare and Medicaid Services reimburse them at the same rates that traditional hospital care commands.
