= NHS Property Services =

British state-owned health property services company

- Company type: State-owned limited company
- Founded: 20 December 2011
- Headquarters: Stockport, Greater Manchester, England
- Owner: Department of Health and Social Care
- Website: www.property.nhs.uk

NHS Property Services Limited is a company owned by the Department of Health and Social Care in the United Kingdom that took over the ownership of around 3,600 National Health Service (NHS) facilities in April 2013.

== Creation and purpose ==
Following the Health and Social Care Act 2012, strategic health authorities and primary care trusts in England were abolished and replaced with GP led commissioning consortia in April 2013. All properties which were not passed to the commissioning groups were transferred to NHS Property Services. The company now manages, maintains and develops the 3,500 NHS properties across England.

“Hard” facilities management services, such as plumbing, electrical, mechanical, water and fire safety systems, and lighting were provided by outsourcing giant Mitie from 2016 until April 2020 when they were taken in-house. About 140 Mitie employees were transferred to NHS Property Services. Mitie continues to provide some other services — such as air conditioning, heating and gas. Other services are provided by Chubb Locks, Premier Technical Services Group Limited, and Dale.

== BMA legal case ==
In 2020 a legal case was brought by the British Medical Association which argued the fees NHS Property Services demanded were unlawful. The dispute over rent and service charges incurred by GPs who occupy PropCo-owned property affected more than 800 GP practices. In February 2021, NHS PSL countersued over unpaid fees. The full trial for the BMA’s case and NHS Property Services’s counterclaim was scheduled for March 2022. In the judgement released in June 2022, it was determined the practices contesting the case did owe fees but the details were to be later determined by the court to the extent that amounts and terms were still disputed by the parties to the case. In an out of court settlement, the BMA and NHS PSL agreed significant reductions in outstanding fees for those practices party to the cases.

== Commercial information ==
In 2021 it was reported that it had agreed tenancy details with 97% of the providers who used its buildings and that the organisations debts had been reduced from more than £700 million in 2019 to less than £500 million. Martin Steele, the chief executive, said a court judgment on the charging mechanisms would be “good news because at least everyone will be clear on the position”.

In 2022 the company had transformed 69 vacant or under-utilised spaces in its properties for use by community groups or provision of non-clinical services as part of its national social prescribing programme.
