= Healthwatch England =

Statutory body created in 2013

Healthwatch England is a committee of the Care Quality Commission established under the Health and Social Care Act 2012, which took effect in April 2013. Its role is to gather and champion the views of users of health and social care services, in order to identify improvements and influence providers' plans. The Healthwatch network is made of up of local Healthwatch groups in each of England's local authority areas, and Healthwatch England, the national body. In June 2025, the UK government stated an intention to abolish these bodies and move their functions into government departments and the NHS. In September 2026, it was reported that there were plans to preserve independent local voice organizations.

== Organisation ==
Healthwatch England is a statutory body whose purpose is to understand the needs, experiences and concerns of people who use health and social care services and to speak out on their behalf. The local groups work together to share information, expertise and learning in order to improve health and social care services.

When established, the organisation was hosted by the Care Quality Commission but reported directly to the Department of Health. However, in January 2016, in a move seen as downgrading the organisation after the departure of its first chief executive, it was announced that a new national director would be appointed who would report to the chief executive of the CQC. David Behan said that although the national director would report to him, they would be able to criticise the work of the CQC if necessary.

Sir Robert Francis was appointed chair in September 2018. Louise Ansari was appointed chief executive in November 2021.

== Predecessor organisations ==
Healthwatch followed earlier reorganisations of arrangements to involve patients and the public in the running of the NHS in England. Community Health Councils (CHC) were established in 1974 and abolished in 2003 to be replaced by Public and Patient Involvement Forums run by the Commission for Patient and Public Involvement in Health. They were replaced in their turn in April 2008 by Local Involvement Networks. Community Health Councils continue in Wales. Scotland has a different system run by the Scottish Health Council.

== Resources ==
The 148 local Healthwatch groups were allocated £43.5m by the Department of Health in 2013 but the groups only received £33.5m of this, leaving £10m unaccounted for. Anna Bradley, chair of Healthwatch England, said: "This discovery is hugely disappointing. Less than 4p out of every £10,000 spent on health and social care was allocated to champion the cause of consumers in the first place and even this tiny amount is failing to reach those charged with speaking out on behalf of their local communities. The tragedies of Audrey Paley, Mid Staffs, Morecambe Bay and Winterbourne View all highlight what happens when the system fails to listen." Almost a third of councils cut their local Healthwatch budgets in 2015–16 by an average of 14%, Blackpool and Hounslow by more than half.

For 2018–19 it was planned that the 152 local Healthwatch services should receive £26,064,086 from local authorities to carry out their statutory activities, 35.3% less than was originally planned in 2013. This paid for 408 full-time equivalent staff. Local Healthwatch organisations also engage a considerable number of volunteers. In November 2018 it was announced that NHS England and NHS Improvement were to make "significant investment" into the organisation in order to encourage participation in the development of the NHS's long term plan.

In 2022 Sir Robert Francis resigned the chair, saying funding cuts meant the organisation could soon struggle "to fulfil its vital role".

== Local Healthwatch ==
The announced intention was that each local Healthwatch would be an independent organisation, able to employ its own staff and involve volunteers and accountable in its own right. Plans to make the local Healthwatch in Leicester an independent organisation were thwarted by Voluntary Action Leicester who had been charged with establishing the organisation but would not hand over the contract to the newly established Healthwatch Leicester Ltd.

== National activity ==
The organisation produced a report entitled Safely Home: what happens when people leave hospital and care settings? in July 2015, which was based on thousands of instances of people leaving hospital without the right planning and support.

== Criticism ==
The 2015 People's Inquiry into London's NHS recommended that Healthwatch England be closed down, with local Healthwatch bodies separated from the Care Quality Commission and modelled on the old Community Health Councils. They should link up with local community organisations, pensioners' groups and other community organisations, and be given statutory powers to inspect hospital and community services, to object to changes which lack public acceptance, and to force a decision on contested changes from the Secretary of State.

== Abolition ==
On 28 June 2025, the UK government announced that Healthwatch England would be abolished as part of a major restructuring of the National Health Service in England. The decision to disband the organisation was part of Labour's 10-year health strategy aimed at simplifying NHS oversight, with Health Secretary Wes Streeting citing the need for "more doers and fewer checkers". The government said that they would integrate Healthwatch's functions into the NHS and government departments, with increased reliance on the NHS app for patient feedback. The move drew concern from health leaders and Healthwatch staff, who emphasised the importance of maintaining patient advocacy and feedback mechanisms.

In September 2026, it was reported that there were plans to preserve independent local voice organizations.
