= Patient Advice and Liaison Service =

The Patient Advice and Liaison Service (PALS), also known as the Patient Advice and Support Service (PASS) in Scotland, is a National Health Service body created to provide advice and support to NHS patients and their relatives and carers. The scheme was announced in the NHS Plan 2000. Pilot schemes were set up in 2001, with full nationwide implementation complete by 2002.

== Functions ==
The functions of PALS are to:

- Be identifiable and accessible to patients, their carers, friends and families
- Provide on the spot help in every Trust with the power to negotiate immediate solutions or speedy resolution of problems
- Act as a gateway to appropriate independent advice and advocacy support from local and national sources
- Provide accurate information to patients, carers and families, about the Trust’s services, and about other health related issues
- Act as a catalyst for change and improvement by providing the Trust with information and feedback on problems arising and gaps in services
- Operate within a local network with other PALS in their area and work across organisational boundaries
- Support staff at all levels within the Trust to develop a responsive culture

The service can, for instance, act as a first point of contact for complaints, as well as providing information on NHS services and available treatment options. In some areas, PALS also provide complaint handling for hospitals. PALS services are therefore not always independent.
