= Mike Farrar =

British civil servant

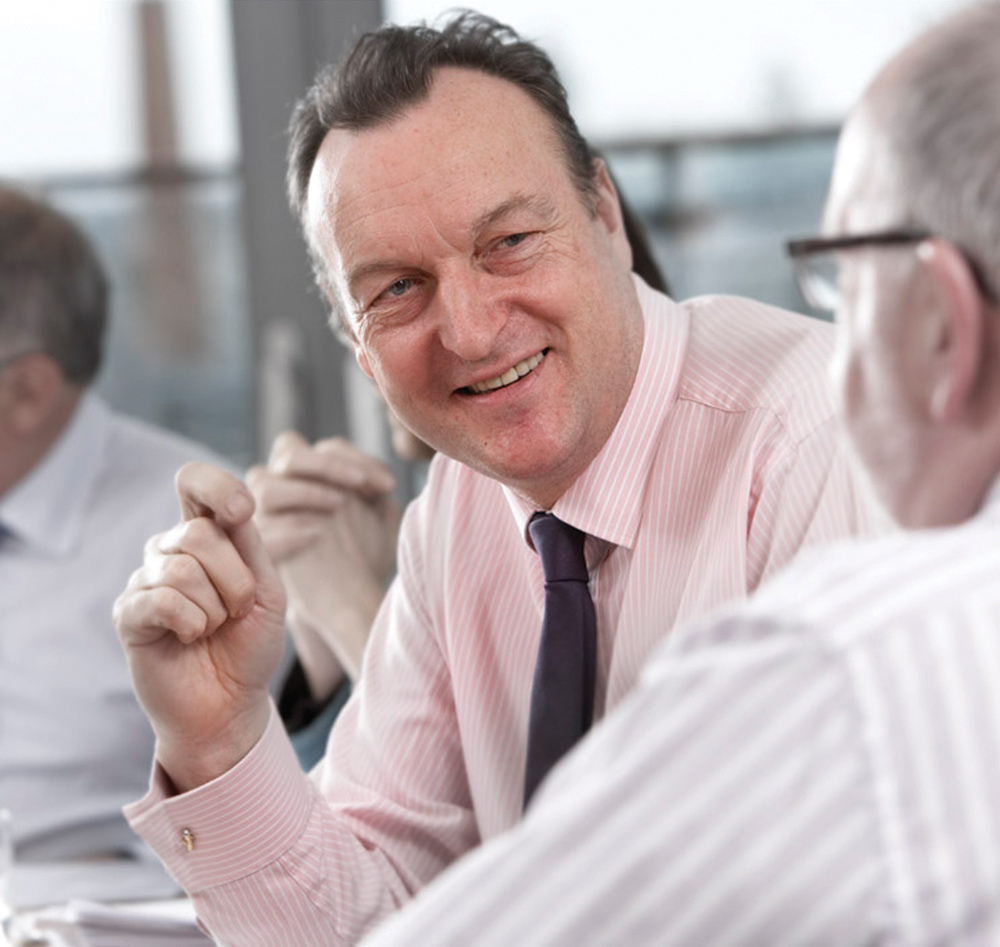
Farrar on 3 May 2011

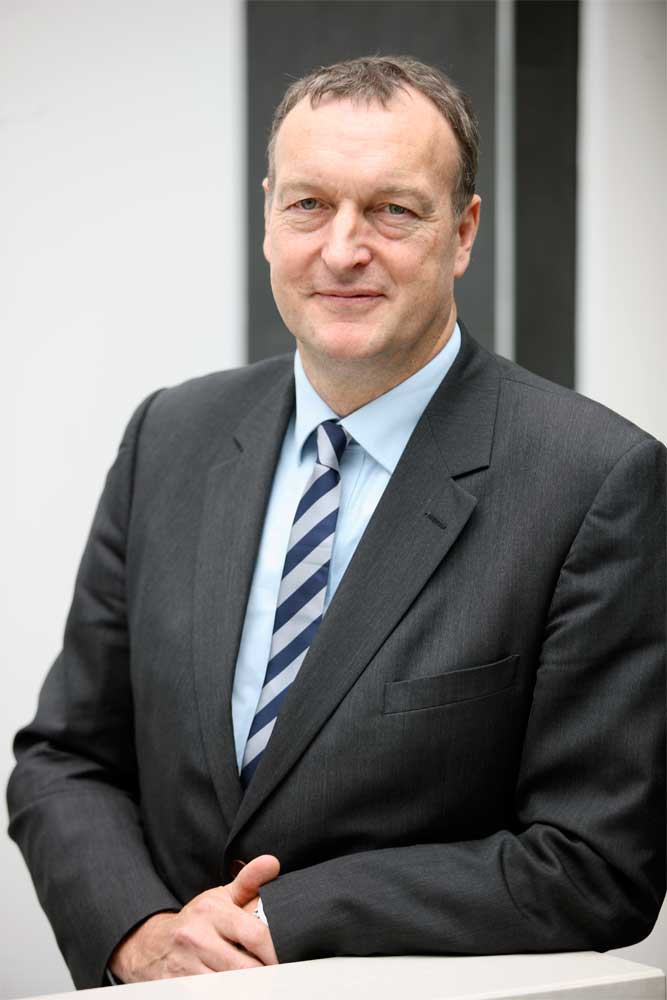
Mike Farrar at the NHS Confederation annual conference in Manchester

Mike Farrar CBE (born in 1960) was Chief Executive of the NHS Confederation from 2011 until October 2013.

== Early career ==
Prior to working for the NHS, he worked for Grand Metropolitan UK Ltd and pursued early aspirations to play professional football and cricket, playing semi-professionally for Rochdale Football Club and as a fast bowler for Littleborough Cricket Club. He was appointed to the board of Sport England in April 2005 and acted as the interim chair from December 2007 following the resignation of Derek Mapp. He stepped down from the chair in March 2009 with the appointment of Richard Lewis but remained a member of the board.

== NHS career ==
Prior to his appointment as Chief Executive of the NHS Confederation, Mike Farrar was a senior manager within the National Health Service (NHS) of the United Kingdom and previous Senior Civil Servant.

His roles have included; Chief Executive of West Yorkshire and South Yorkshire Strategic Health Authorities, Chief Executive of Tees Valley Health Authority and Head of Primary Care at the Department of Health (United Kingdom). During his time at the Department of Health, he was responsible for establishing Primary Care Groups, Primary Care Trusts and PMS. In addition he chaired the NHS Confederation GP Contract negotiating team that successfully negotiated the new General Medical Service contract and is the National Programme Director of NHS Live.

Farrar's first position with the NHS was as a gardener at Rochdale Infirmary between 1977 and 1979. In 1982 he joined Rochdale Health Authority as a health promotion officer and then went on to set up an alcohol and drug service for Yorkshire. Further positions included chief executive of Tees Health Authority, head of primary care at the Department of Health and chief executive at South Yorkshire Strategic Health Authority and West Yorkshire Strategic Health Authority. On 1 July 2006, he became Chief Executive of NHS North West, the new strategic health authority for North West England, as part of the new centralised SHA structure. He left this post for the NHS Confederation in October 2011, as NHS North West became one of three SHAs to be merged to form the NHS North of England SHA Cluster from May 2006 to April 2011. From 2002 to 2009 he was the Chair of the Strategic Health Authority Chief Executives Group. In addition, he is a member of the National Migration Impact Forum, which is a Ministerial sounding Board for immigration policy (including the new points based migration system)

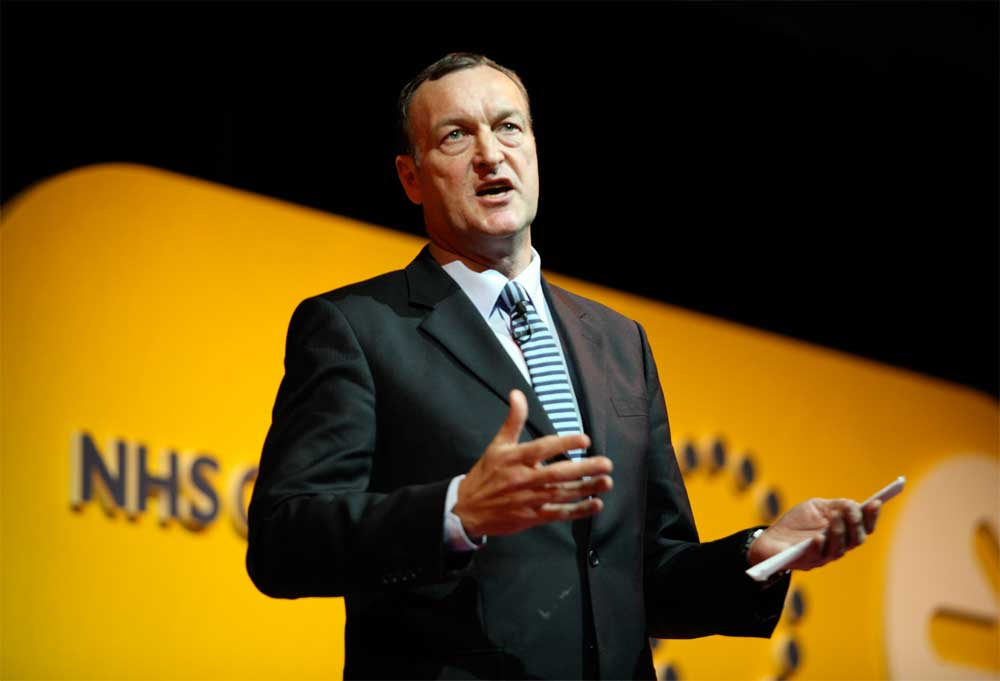
Mike Farrar at the NHS Confederation annual conference. Manchester 7 July 2011

Mike Farrar has now resigned from the NHS altogether, and started a consulting business, Mike Farrar Consulting Lmt. He now works closely with Alan Milburn. He has also taken the role of chair of Swim England, he is a trustee of the EFL Trust, Chair of Rugby League Players Welfare Forum and Chair of Hudds Town/Hudds Giants Community Sports Trust as well as former National Tsar for Sport and Health, carrying on his sport interests.

In February 2025 it was announced that he will take up the role of interim Permanent Secretary of the Northern Ireland Department of Health in April 2025 following the retirement of Peter May.

He is an Honorary Fellow of the Royal College of General Practitioners, the Royal College of Physicians and of the University of Central Lancashire.
