= NHS North West =

NHS North West was a strategic health authority (SHA) of the National Health Service in England. It operated in the North West region, which is coterminous with the local government office region.

When created in 2006 it had regional oversight of 24 Primary Care Trusts, 23 acute NHS trusts, 8 mental health trusts, 7 specialist trusts, as well as the North West Ambulance Service.

In October 2011, in preparation for planned government changes, NHS North West, alongside NHS Yorkshire and Humberside and NHS North East became a part of the NHS North of England SHA cluster - a temporary administrative merger to manage the North of England health economy until the planned dissolution of SHAs in March 2013. The merger initially retained all staff but merged the three separate boards into one. The former Chief Executive of NHS North West, Mike Farrar, left at that time to become the Chief Executive of the NHS Confederation.

The authority closed on 31 March 2013 as part of the Health and Social Care Act 2012.

== Acute trusts ==
=== Greater Manchester ===
- Central Manchester University Hospitals NHS Foundation Trust
- The Christie NHS Foundation Trust
- Pennine Acute Hospital NHS Trust
- Royal Bolton Hospital NHS Foundation Trust
- Stockport NHS Foundation Trust
- Salford Royal NHS Foundation Trust
- Tameside Hospital NHS Foundation Trust
- Trafford Healthcare NHS Trust
- University Hospital of South Manchester NHS Foundation Trust
- Wrightington, Wigan & Leigh NHS Foundation Trust

=== Merseyside ===
- Alder Hey Children's NHS Foundation Trust
- Liverpool Women's NHS Foundation Trust
- Royal Liverpool and Broadgreen University Hospitals NHS Trust
- Aintree Foundation University Hospital NHS Trust

=== Lancashire ===
- Blackpool, Fylde and Wyre Hospitals NHS Foundation Trust
- East Lancashire Hospitals NHS Trust
- Lancashire Teaching Hospitals NHS Foundation Trust
- North Cumbria Hospitals NHS Foundation Trust
- University Hospitals of Morecambe Bay NHS Foundation Trust

== Primary care trusts ==
- Ashton, Leigh and Wigan
- Blackburn with Darwen Teaching
- Blackpool
- Bolton
- Bury
- Central and Eastern Cheshire
- Central Lancashire
- Cumbria
- East Lancashire
- St Helens
- Heywood, Middleton and Rochdale
- Knowsley
- Liverpool
- Manchester
- North Lancashire Teaching
- Oldham
- Salford
- Sefton
- Stockport
- Tameside and Glossop
- Trafford
- Warrington and Halton
- Western Cheshire
- Wirral

In October 2011, in preparation for planned government changes, the 24 Primary Care Trusts were organised under five sub-regional clusters: Greater Manchester, Merseyside, Lancashire, Cheshire & Wirral, and Cumbria. The initial effect of this clustering was again to telescope the number of separate boards whilst retaining most staff initially in their current roles as new Clinical Commissioning Groups (CCGs) were set up and began to assume commissioning responsibilities.
