= Community health council =

Community health councils were established in 1974 as a result of the National Health Service Reorganisation Act 1973 to provide a voice for patients and the public in the National Health Service (NHS) in England and Wales.

== Statutory Provisions ==
Community health councils were obliged to meet in public under the provisions of the Community Health Councils (Access to Information) Act 1988. They were entitled to be consulted about the provision of local pharmacies. Half the members were appointed by local authorities, a third by local voluntary organisations and a sixth by the Regional health authority, which provided the finance to pay staff and costs. They were entitled to be consulted on any substantial development of the health service and on any proposals to make any substantial variation in the service. The question of what constituted a substantial variation was subject to repeated litigation. CHCs also had an important role in helping people who had complaints about NHS services

== Abolition in England ==
They were abolished in 2003 in England as part of the NHS Plan 2000. Unlike the other proposals in the Plan there was no preceding discussion about this move, nor any clear explanation for this decision, which aroused considerable unhappiness amongst the staff and members. In England a new structure, Public and Patient Involvement Forums, was established in 2003. These were replaced by local involvement networks (LINks) and these have now also been superseded in NHS England by the establishment - as a result of the English NHS reforms in 2012 - by new organisations called Healthwatch. These do not, however, have the same resources, statutory powers or responsibilities as CHCs.

== Abolition in Wales ==
Up until 2010 there were 19 CHCs in Wales. However, as a result of the passing by the Welsh Assembly Government of the Community Health Councils (Constitution, Membership and Procedures) (Wales) Regulations 2010, these were replaced by eight CHCs. These covered larger geographical areas, and were largely coterminous with the smaller number of health boards which had been established to replace most NHS Trusts in Wales. In 2015, Brecknock and Radnor Community Health Council and Montgomeryshire Community Health Council merged to create Powys Community Health Council leading to the seven Community Health Councils in Wales.

The community health councils in Wales worked to enhance and improve the quality of your local health service. They were the patients' statutory and independent voice in health services provided throughout Wales.

Members were drawn equally from three sources; local authority representatives, nominees from local third-sector bodies and members appointed by the Minister in response to advert. CHCs also had the right to co-opt non-voting members to the council.

The key function of the CHC was to represent the interests of the public in the health service in their district. Each CHC monitored and evaluates from the patient's viewpoint the effectiveness of NHS services provided by all NHS establishments, including hospitals, GPs, pharmacies, opticians, care homes, dentists, etc. Every autumn, the Hospital Patient Environment (HPE) visits took place, this is where all the CHCs collected data on their local district general and a selection of community hospitals and report on their finding. A report would have been produced on these findings by the Board of Community Health Councils and sent to the Welsh Government. The Board of Community Health Councils in Wales is the National body for all CHCs in Wales. The CHCs also provided a free, independent and confidential advocacy service to patients who sought advice and support in the process of pursuing a complaint against the NHS.

At the time of the launch of the new CHCs in 2010, the then Health Minister for Wales, Edwina Hart, indicated that they would be reviewed after two years, to evaluate how they were working. In February 2012 the then Minister for Health and Social Services at the Welsh Government, Mrs Lesley Griffiths, formally announced the Terms of Reference for this review, which was led by Professor Marcus Longley, Director of the Welsh Institute for Health and Social Care and reported back to the Minister in June 2012. This was followed in late 2012/early 2013 by a consultation on proposals for modernising and strengthening the role, organisation, accountability and visibility of CHCs in Wales. The proposals were accepted by the new Health Minister, Professor Mark Drakeford, in a report back to a Plenary Session of the National Assembly for Wales Senedd in March 2013, where the Minister confirmed his continuing support for CHCs in Wales. Although legislation will be required to implement some of the proposals, most are likely to be put in place without the need for legislation, with the Board of CHCs in wales taking the lead role in co-ordinating the work.

All CHCs in Wales were replaced by Llais.
