= Local involvement network =

Agency overview
- Formed: April 2008
- Preceding agency: Commission for Patient and Public Involvement in Health
- Dissolved: April 2013
- Annual budget: £84 million
- Parent department: National Health Service

Local involvement networks (LINks) were launched by England's National Health Service in April 2008 following the Local Government and Public Involvement in Health Act 2007. They replaced the Commission for Patient and Public Involvement in Health (CPPIH) and patient and public involvement forums and existed in every local authority area with a responsibility for NHS health care and social services.

There were 151 LINks and the Government committed £84 million in funding to them until March 2011. They were abolished at the end of March 2013.

== About LINks ==
LINks were supposed to ask people what they like and dislike about NHS care services and adult social care services and seek ideas from the public to help improve services. They explored specific issues of concern to the community by collecting feedback from local people. LINks could tell those who commission, provide and manage local services what the community thinks and work with commissioners and providers to improve, amend, reconfigure and supplement services. They also had the power to carry out visits to services to see them at work. They sometimes facilitated consultation on new or revised commissioning and provision of services.

LINks had the power to ask health and care commissioners for information about their services and expect a response within 20 days. They issued reports and made recommendations about services with the expectation of a response from commissioners. The power to enter certain services and view the care provided was called Enter & View. LINk members had to undergo training in order to carry out this power. LINks could also refer health & social care matters to the local council’s Overview and Scrutiny Committee if local service providers did not provide a satisfactory response.

There was no set structure for a LINk. Funding came from local councils, who were given money by the Department of Health to finance them. Each LINk was hosted by a "host organisation" of paid staff to set up and support the LINk. The host was accountable to the LINk. LINks were independent of the Government. An example of a host organisation is Voluntary Norfolk, the lead partner of a consortium selected as the host for Norfolk LINk.

Anyone wanting to have their say on how health and social care services are delivered in their area could become a member of a LINk. The principle was that "everyone's views matter", including individuals, such as carers, service users, community leaders, patient representatives, health and social care professionals (as long as any conflict of interest are appropriately handled or managed), organisations.

Certain bodies could not be part of a LINk, these include National Health Service trusts, NHS foundation trusts, NHS primary care trusts and strategic health authorities.

LINks were intended to give people a range of ways to get involved, whether this just taking a few minutes to answer a survey or taking more time to train as a representative who visits services to see how they are run.

Norfolk LINk's work influencing how myalgic encephalomyelitis/chronic fatigue syndrome (ME/CFS) services are planned and delivered in Norfolk is an example of how LINks practice.

== Healthwatch ==
In July 2010 the Government released a White Paper called Liberating the NHS. The White Paper proposed the abolition of LINks and the introduction of Local Healthwatch; this was included in the Health and Social Care Act 2012. The intention was to strengthen public influence and involvement in health and social care, as well as to remove the ambiguity of the then-current 'hosting' arrangements.

Originally scheduled for April 2012, but then delayed until April 2013, it was envisaged that local Healthwatch would build upon the existing functions of LINks to include the provision of information and advice to help people make choices about health and care services as well as the possibility of providing an advocacy service for people making a complaint using the NHS complaints process.

HealthWatch England was also set up as an independent arm of the Care Quality Commission, with a specific remit to represent at a national level people using health and social care services. Healthwatch England uses evidence from Local Healthwatch and from carrying out its own work to identify concerns and poorly-performing services. It is then able to recommend to Care Quality Commission that they investigate those services.
