= NHS Plan 2000 =

UK healthcare reform policy

The NHS Plan 2000 was a ten-year plan of the Blair ministry for the National Health Service (England). It combined a commitment to substantial investment with some quite radical changes. The most controversial aspect of the plan was the introduction of more private sector providers and a more competitive internal market. The plan, coming shortly after devolution, marked the beginning of divergence between the NHS in England and NHS Wales. NHS Scotland was legally distinct from England from the beginning of the NHS in 1948.

NHS Wales produced Improving Health in Wales early in 2001

Unlike some later plans for NHS reform there was a great deal of effort devoted to marshalling political support for the plan. At the beginning of the printed document were two pages with the signatures of 25 prominent leaders in the health field, including doctors, Trades Unions, patient charities and the Local Government Association

== Main features ==
The main features the plan promised were:

- more staff: 7,500 more consultants, 2,000 more GPs, 20,000 extra nurses and 6,500 extra therapists
- 7,000 extra beds in hospitals and intermediate care
- increase in the proportion of day case surgery to 75%
- over 100 new hospitals by 2010 mostly delivered through the Private Finance Initiative
- an unspecified number of fully operational Treatment centres
- all outpatient appointments and inpatient elective admissions, including day cases, to be pre-booked by the end of 2005 and electronic patient records in all primary care trusts by 2008
- around 500 primary care one-stop centres
- expanding the capacity of NHS Direct from 7.5 million callers per year to 30 million callers per year
- Waiting times to be reduced from 18 to six months by 2004 and to three months by 2008
- A "concordat" with the private sector to provide extra capacity
- £570m more for cancer services by 2003/4
- £230m more for heart disease treatments by 2003/4
- National School Fruit Scheme to provide all four to six-year-olds with a piece of fruit a day to reduce health risks in later life
- new National Clinical Assessment Authority to restore public confidence in doctors

Tony Blair in his foreword promised that the March 2000 Budget settlement meant that the NHS would grow by one half in cash terms and by one third in real terms in five years.

Other developments flowing from the plan included care trusts, nurse prescribing, the creation of the Patient Advice and Liaison Service and the abolition of community health councils.

Patients were promised that letters about an individual patient's care will be copied to the patient, that there would be better information to help patients choose a GP and that there would be proper redress when operations were cancelled on the day they are due to take place.

== Political perspective ==
According to Jennifer Dixon of the King's Fund writing in the British Medical Journal just after publication: "This is probably as good as it gets: a significant injection of money for the NHS sustained over five years coupled with a comprehensive national plan".

The core principles of the plan were still being celebrated by the Socialist Health Association in 2013.

In 2014 there was a great deal of reflection on the NHS plan when Simon Stevens, who was one of the authors of the Plan produced the Five Year Forward View of the NHS in England. Fraser Nelson described it as a "brilliant, radical and enduring document" which "prescribed a heavy dose of market reform" - of which he approved. He claimed that Alan Milburn redefined the NHS as a means of paying for healthcare, not necessarily providing it.

== See also ==
- Five Year Forward View
- NHS Long Term Plan
- Health and Social Care Act 2001
