= Health authority =

Overview of health authorities in England and Wales

Between 1996 and 2002, the National Health Service in England and Wales was organised under health authorities (HAs). There were 95 HAs at the time of their abolition in England in 2002, and they reported to the eight regional offices of the NHS Executive. They generally covered groups of one or more complete local authority districts (LADs), but there were cases where LADs were split.

They were established in 1996 by the Health Authorities Act 1995. They took on the functions of the abolished district health authorities (DHAs) and family health services authorities (FHSAs).

There were five HAs in Wales, reporting to the National Assembly. The HAs were divided into a total of 22 local health groups (LHGs), one in each of the Welsh unitary authorities. These HAs and LHGs were abolished when the Welsh NHS was restructured on 1 April 2003.

The HAs in England were themselves divided into Primary Care Organisations (PCOs) created in 1999. When PCOs were first established, there were 481 primary care groups (PCGs). However, by 2002, a significant number had converted to primary care trusts (PCTs). The numbers of both HAs and PCOs varied slightly until 2002.

In 2002, the HAs were abolished by the National Health Service Reform and Health Care Professions Act 2002. Their functions were mostly taken up by 300 PCTs, and 28 strategic health authorities (SHAs) were established (which were reduced in number to 10 in 2006).

| Region | Health Authorities |
|---|---|
| East of England | Bedfordshire, Cambridgeshire, Hertfordshire, Norfolk, North Essex, South Essex, Suffolk |
| East Midlands | Leicestershire, Lincolnshire, North Derbyshire, North Nottinghamshire, Northamptonshire, Nottingham, Southern Derbyshire |
| London | Barking & Havering, Barnet & Enfield & Haringey, Bexley & Bromley & Greenwich, Brent & Harrow, Camden & Islington, Croydon, Ealing & Hammersmith & Hounslow, East London & The City, Hillingdon, Kensington & Chelsea & Westminster, Kingston & Richmond, Lambeth & Southwark & Lewisham, Merton, Redbridge & Waltham Forest, Sutton & Wandsworth |
| North East England | County Durham & Darlington, Gateshead & South Tyneside, Newcastle & North Tyneside, Northumberland, Sunderland, Tees |
| North West England | Bury & Rochdale, East Lancashire, Liverpool, Manchester, Morecambe Bay, North Cheshire, North Cumbria, North-West Lancashire, Salford & Trafford, Sefton, South Cheshire, South Lancashire, St Helens & Knowsley, Stockport, West Pennine, (Note: Also included part of High Peak in Derbyshire (East Midlands).) Wigan & Bolton, Wirral |
| South East England | Berkshire, Buckinghamshire, East Kent, East Surrey, East Sussex & Brighton and Hove, Isle of Wight & Portsmouth & South East Hampshire, North & Mid Hampshire, Oxfordshire, Southampton & South West Hampshire, West Kent, West Surrey, West Sussex |
| South West England | Avon, Cornwall & Isles of Scilly, Dorset, Gloucestershire, North and East Devon, Somerset, South and West Devon, Wiltshire |
| West Midlands | Birmingham, Coventry, Dudley, Herefordshire, North Staffordshire, Sandwell, Shropshire, Solihull, South Staffordshire, Walsall, Warwickshire, Wolverhampton, Worcestershire |
| Yorkshire and the Humber | Barnsley, Bradford, Calderdale & Kirklees, Doncaster, East Riding & Hull, Leeds, North & North East Lincolnshire, North Yorkshire, Rotherham, Sheffield, Wakefield |

There were originally separate authorities for Barnet and Enfield & Haringey, for Bexley & Greenwich and Bromley, for East & North Hertfordshire and South Hertfordshire, and for the Isle of Wight & Portsmouth and South-East Hampshire. Also, the area of Norfolk and Cambridgeshire was partitioned between three authorities : Cambridge & Huntingdon, East Norfolk, and North West Anglia. North West Anglia included from Cambridgeshire: Peterborough, Fenland, part of Huntingdonshire, and from Norfolk: King's Lynn and West Norfolk and part of Breckland.

Also, "East Riding and Hull" was originally known as "East Riding", , "County Durham and Darlington" was originally known as "County Durham"

== See also ==
- Health and Safety Authority – the state-sponsored body in Ireland which has responsibility for occupational health and safety.
