= Commission for Patient and Public Involvement in Health =

Public body of the Department of Health and Social Care

- Formation: September 2003
- Dissolved: 31 March 2008
- Type: Arm's Length Body
- Location: England, UK
- Owner: Department of Health
- Key people: Steve Lowden (Chief Executive); Sharon Grant (Chair)
- Website: cppih.org

The Commission for Patient and Public Involvement in Health (CPPIH) was an independent, non-departmental public body sponsored by the Department of Health and Social Care. The Commission was established by and act of Parliament on 10 December 2002 with a remit "to establish a new system of patient and public involvement in health for England involving traditionally hard to reach groups" – however, there was no agreed budget or management structure in place at that time. The Commission operated from September 2003 until March 2008 when it was replaced with local involvement networks (LINks), involvement mechanisms that extend public involvement to health and social care.

== Background ==
The commssion was formed in 2003. It was included in the Department of Health's "Arm's Length Body Review" (starting November 2003, ending March 2004) and was included in the list of ALBs listed for abolition. In the original review, the Department of Health stated that "Patients’ Forums will remain the cornerstone of the arrangements we have put in place to create opportunities for patients and the public to influence health services" and that the "NHS Appointments Commission will appoint Forum members in the future." However, it soon became clear that the Appointments Commission did not want to take responsibility for this, and the CPPIH continues to recruit members to the forums. The commission was officially abolished on 31 March 2008 when patients' forums were replaced by local involvement networks (LINks); which, although similar in structure had greatly reduced powers of monitoring, inspection and involvement.

== Structure ==
=== The regions ===
Initially the nationwide structure of the CPPIH consisted of nine regional centres and one national centre in Birmingham. The nine regions were:

- North-east – office in Gateshead
- North-west – office in Warrington
- Humberside/Yorkshire – office in Leeds
- East Midlands – office in Nottingham
- West Midlands – office in Birmingham
- East of England – office in Cambridge
- South-east – office in Guildford
- South-west – office in Exeter
- London – office in London

Following the 2006 restructure, these regions were reduced to four: North (previously North-east, Humberside/Yorkshire and East Midlands), West (West Midlands & North-west), East (East of England and London) and South (South-east and South-west). The individual regional offices were maintained due to contractual restrictions; the majority of the offices had been opened on long-term leases that CPPIH were unable to buy-out or cancel.

=== The forums ===
In order to involve patients and the public in its statutory mandate, the CPPIH was structured so that each primary care trust, ambulance services trust, mental health trust and hospital trust had a "Public and Patient Involvement Forum" working with them. The 572 forums were made up of volunteers, initially recruited prior to 1 January 2004.

Each forum was initially required to have seven members, with a view to recruiting on to a total of 10 to 15 members. However, again due to budgetary restraints, many forums did not maintain their initial membership, and further recruitment was slowed to allow issues such as diversity and geographic location to be taken into account.
