= NHS primary care trust =

Defunct National Health Service organisation

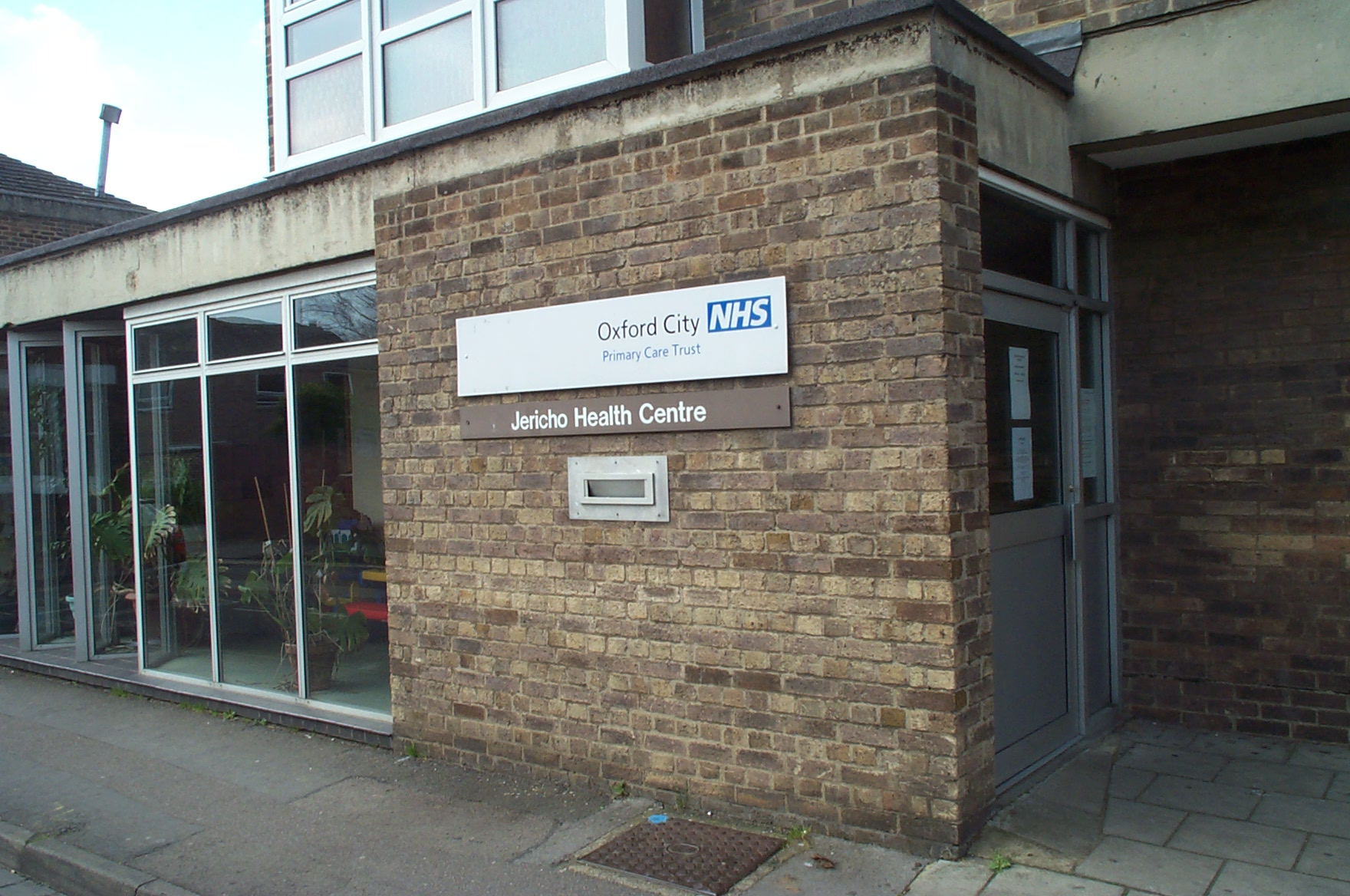
A primary care trust could commission community health centres.

Primary care trusts (PCTs) were part of the National Health Service in England from 2001 to 2013. PCTs were largely administrative bodies, responsible for commissioning primary, community and secondary health services from providers. Until 31 May 2011, they also provided community health services directly. Collectively PCTs were responsible for spending around 80 per cent of the total NHS budget. Primary care trusts were abolished on 31 March 2013 as part of the Health and Social Care Act 2012, with their work taken over by clinical commissioning groups.

== Establishment ==
In 1997 the incoming Labour Government abolished GP Fundholding. In April 1999 they established 481 primary care groups in England "thereby universalising fundholding while repudiating the concept." Primary and community health services were brought together in a single Primary Care Group controlling a unified budget for delivering health care to and improving the health of communities of about 100,000 people. A PCG was legally speaking a subcommittee of a district health authority. As part of the implementation of the NHS Plan 2000 PCGs were transformed into primary care trusts. 17 trusts were established in April 2000, a further 23 in October 2000, and 124 in April 2001 with a plan that all primary care groups would become trusts by 2004. This was said to be a break with the market culture of the previous government, replacing GP Fundholding with a corporate culture that emphasises partnership and collective responsibility.

The National Health Service Reform and Health Care Professions Act 2002 required the Secretary of State for Health to establish strategic health authorities (SHAs) and primary care trusts (PCTs) to cover all areas in England and abolished the 95 health authorities which has been created under the Health Authorities Act 1995, moving most of their functions to the PCTs.

PCTs held their own budgets and set their own priorities, within the overriding priorities and budgets set by the relevant strategic health authority, and the Department of Health. They provided funding for general practitioners and medical prescriptions; they also commissioned hospital and mental health services from NHS provider trusts or from the private sector. Many PCTs used the naming style of "NHS" followed by the geographical area, to make it easier for local people to understand the management of the NHS locally.

== Management ==
PCTs were managed by a team of executive directors headed by a chief executive. These directors were members of the trust's board, together with non-executive directors appointed after open advertisement. The chairman of each trust was a non-executive director. Other board members included the chair of the trust's professional executive committee (PEC) (elected from local general practitioners, community nurses, pharmacists, dentists etc.).

The financial budgets, and much of the agenda, of PCTs were effectively determined by directives from the strategic health authority (SHA) or the Department of Health.

== Restructuring ==
In 2005 the government announced that the number of strategic health authorities and primary care trusts would be reduced, the latter by about 50 per cent. The result was that, as of 1 October 2006, there were 152 PCTs (reduced from 303) in England, with an average population of just under 330,000 per trust. After these changes, about 70 per cent of PCTs were coterminous with local authorities having social service responsibilities, which facilitated joint planning.

Providing responsibilities were gradually removed from PCTs under the Transforming Community Services initiative.

On 12 July 2010, the then Secretary of State for Health, Andrew Lansley, unveiled a new health white paper (which eventually became law as the Health and Social Care Act 2012) describing significant structural changes to the NHS under the Conservative and Liberal Democrat coalition government. Among the changes announced, PCTs were to be abolished by 2013 with new GP-led commissioning consortia, clinical commissioning groups, taking on most of the responsibilities they formerly held. The public health aspects of PCT business would become the responsibility of local councils. Facilities owned by PCTs would transfer to NHS Property Services. Strategic health authorities would also be abolished under these plans. Following widespread criticism of the plans, on 4 April 2011, the Government announced a "pause" in the progress of the Health and Social Care Bill to allow the government to "listen, reflect and improve" the proposals.

The Health and Social Care Act 2012 received royal assent on 27 March 2012 and PCTs were formally abolished on 31 March 2013. Some of their staff were transferred to commissioning support units, some to local authorities, some to clinical commissioning groups, some to NHS England and some were made redundant.

== See also ==
- List of primary care trusts in England
