= Strategic health authority =

English NHS administrative body

Strategic health authorities (SHA) were part of the structure of the National Health Service in England between 2002 and 2013. Each SHA was responsible for managing performance, enacting directives and implementing health policy as required by the Department of Health at a regional level. Initially 28 in number, they were reduced to 10 in 2006. Along with primary care trusts, they were replaced by clinical commissioning groups and Public Health England in 2013 under the Health and Social Care Act 2012.

== History ==
In 2002, the 95 health authorities (HAs) and eight regional offices of the NHS Executive established under the Health Authorities Act 1995, along with 400 or more primary care groups, were abolished by the National Health Service Reform and Health Care Professions Act 2002. The functions of the HAs were mostly taken up by 300 primary care trusts (PCTs), and 28 larger strategic health authorities (SHAs) were established.

Organisational history of the National Health Service in England
National Government	Ministry of Health (1919–1968)	Department of Health and Social Security (1968–1988)		Department of Health (1988 –2018)			Department of Health and Social Care (2018–Present)
National Level				NHS Executive (1996–2002)		NHS England † (2011–Present)	
Regional Level	Regional Hospital Boards (1947–1974)	Regional Health Authorities (1974–1996)		NHS Executive Regional Offices (1996–2002)	Strategic Health Authorities (2002–2013)		
District Level		Area Health Authorities (1974–1982)	District Health Authorities (1982–1996)	Health Authorities (1996–2002)		Clinical Commissioning Groups (2013–2022)	Integrated Care Boards (2022–Present)
Local Level	Hospital Management Committees (1947–1974)			NHS Trusts (1990–Present)			

† Note that NHS England is due to be dissolved by 2027 and its functions absorbed into the Department of Health and Social Care with the anticipated introduction of the NHS Modernisation Bill into parliament in 2026.

20,000 staff changed jobs and the process was often unclear with little clear guidance given. Many of the changes took place in advance of the legislation.

Following 22 public consultations on the boundaries of the proposed SHAs, the names of the 28 new SHAs were announced on 18 December 2001. The 28 new organisations operated in shadow form until section 1 of the Act came into force on 1 October 2002, and they were formally renamed SHAs.

The role of the SHAs was set out in the white paper, Shifting the Balance of Power within the NHS – Securing Delivery, and included the following:

"Strategic Health Authorities will provide strategic leadership to ensure the delivery of improvements in health and health services locally by PCTs and NHS Trusts within the national framework of developing a patient-centred NHS. They will lead the development and empowerment of innovative and uniformly excellent frontline NHS organisations. The wider span of control will enable Strategic Health Authorities to consider the overall needs of the health economy across primary, community, secondary and tertiary care, and work with PCTs and NHS trusts to deliver a programme to meet these needs."

The goal was to create a coherent strategic framework for the development of services across the full range of local NHS organisations, including:

- Performance management
- Brokering solutions where there were disputes
- Building capacity and supporting performance improvement
- Preparing and delivering cohesive strategies for capital investment
- Working with workforce confederations (in some unspecified way)
- Ensuring effective professional leadership across their area.

=== Evolution ===
A pivotal event seems to have been a loss of financial control in 2005/6 and a failure of the management system to respond quickly or firmly enough. This, combined with some ministerial ambivalence about the effectiveness of SHAs and a promise in the 2005 election to reduce NHS management spending, led to Patricia Hewitt, Secretary of State for Health to announce that, following an NHS consultation which ended in March 2006, the SHAs were to be reorganized. They were reduced to 10 in number by the Strategic Health Authorities (Establishment and Abolition) (England) Order 2006, as amended, and this was expected to produce substantial financial savings.

At the same time there were other important changes that had implications for the functioning of SHAs:

- Span of control – the number of PCTs was reduced to 152 from 302 in 2002 (although there had been a continuous process of mergers). At the same time, an increasing number of providers were achieving foundation trust status. Both of these changed the nature of the relationships of the intermediate layer to local organisations.
- Reporting relationships – the role of CEO of the NHS and Permanent Secretary of the DH were separated and the reporting relationship for SHA CEOs moved to directly report to the NHS CEO.
- Top team changes – the top management team was reduced in size from over 50 during the early part of the period to a much more manageable number, and this was accompanied by the development of procedures to reduce the traffic of policies, instructions and requests for information to the service from the centre.

The period from 2006 saw financial control being restored and key targets were generally achieved. However, further questions about the effectiveness of SHAs and the regulatory process more generally were raised by the 2008 scandal at Mid Staffordshire Hospitals Foundation Trust.

During 2009, SHAs were subject to an assurance process to examine their performance, role in developing their systems and to give developmental feedback. David Nicholson, NHS Chief Executive, said that the recession was one of several factors that had changed the context: "Part of the reason for doing it is that the SHAs' responsibilities are changing as we speak", he said at the time.

SHAs in this period were expected to develop a more directly strategic approach than was the case in the earlier period, following the launch of Lord Darzi's 'Next Stage Review' report in 2008. There were some examples of successful strategic changes being introduced e.g. the implementation of trauma networks, the redesign of stroke services in London, and changes to the shape of services in Manchester, But many strategic issues remained unresolved. This was not helped by the period having an election followed by the introduction of stricter controls on reconfiguration by the incoming government and then an almost two-year period of uncertainty when the government announced its intention to abolish SHAs in May 2010. This led to SHAs being 'clustered' from ten to four in October 2011.

=== Abolition ===
Strategic health authorities and primary care trusts were abolished on 31 March 2013 as part of the Health and Social Care Act 2012. Facilities owned by SHAs were transferred to NHS Property Services, and their public health functions to Public Health England.

== Role ==
Each SHA area contained various NHS trusts which took responsibility for running or commissioning local NHS services, and the SHA was responsible for strategic supervision of these services. The types of trust included:

- Hospital trust
- Ambulance services trust
- Care trust
- Mental health trust
- Primary care trust (PCT)

The SHAs had the board and governance structures common to all NHS trusts.

== List ==
=== Before 2006 reorganisation ===
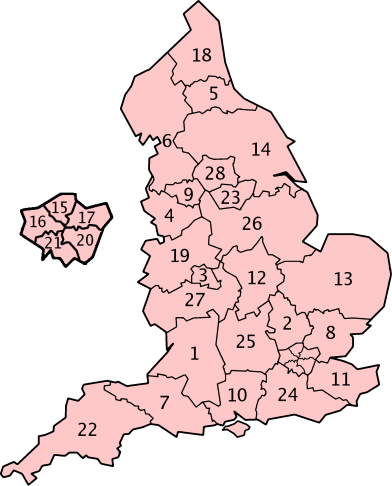

1. Avon, Gloucestershire and Wiltshire SHA
2. Bedfordshire and Hertfordshire SHA
3. Birmingham and The Black Country SHA (West Midlands minus Coventry)
4. Cheshire and Merseyside SHA
5. County Durham and Tees Valley SHA
6. Cumbria and Lancashire SHA
7. Dorset and Somerset SHA
8. Essex SHA
9. Greater Manchester SHA
10. Hampshire and Isle of Wight SHA
11. Kent and Medway SHA
12. Leicestershire, Northamptonshire and Rutland SHA
13. Norfolk, Suffolk and Cambridgeshire SHA
14. North and East Yorkshire and Northern Lincolnshire SHA
15. North Central London SHA
16. North West London SHA
17. North East London SHA
18. Northumberland, Tyne and Wear SHA
19. Shropshire and Staffordshire SHA
20. South East London SHA
21. South West London SHA
22. South West Peninsula SHA
23. South Yorkshire SHA
24. Surrey and Sussex SHA (Surrey, East Sussex, West Sussex)
25. Thames Valley SHA (Oxfordshire, Berkshire, Buckinghamshire)
26. Trent SHA (Derbyshire, Nottinghamshire, Lincolnshire)
27. West Midlands South SHA (Warwickshire, Worcestershire, Herefordshire, Coventry) †
28. West Yorkshire SHA

† known as the 'Coventry, Warwickshire, Herefordshire and Worcestershire SHA until 2004.

The London boundaries were:

- North Central London – Barnet, Camden, Enfield, Haringey, Islington
- North East London – Barking and Dagenham, City, Hackney, Havering, Newham, Redbridge, Tower Hamlets, Waltham Forest
- North West London – Brent, Ealing, Hammersmith and Fulham, Kensington and Chelsea, Harrow, Hillingdon, Hounslow, Westminster
- South East London – Bexley, Bromley, Greenwich, Lambeth, Lewisham, Southwark
- South West London – Croydon, Kingston, Merton, Richmond, Wandsworth, Sutton

These SHAs were replaced by a single London SHA in 2006.

=== After 1 July 2006 ===
The ten SHAs established on 1 July 2006, and abolished on 31 March 2013, were:

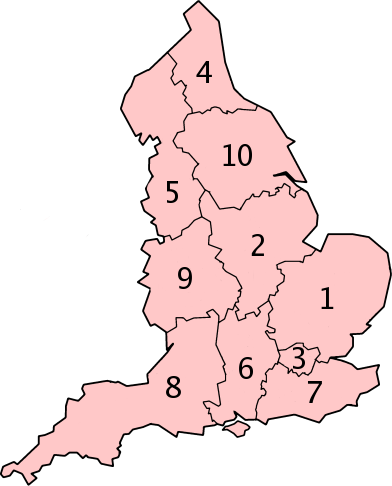

1. NHS East of England (East of England region)
2. NHS East Midlands (East Midlands region)
3. NHS London (London)
4. NHS North East (North East region)
5. NHS North West (North West region)
6. NHS South Central
7. NHS South East Coast
8. NHS South West (South West region)
9. NHS West Midlands (West Midlands region)
10. NHS Yorkshire and the Humber (Yorkshire and the Humber region)

These SHAs are coterminous with government office regions, except that the large South East England region is divided into two: South Central and South East Coast.

== See also ==
- Sustainability and transformation plan – a 2016 reorganisation of NHS England
