= Healthcare in Wiltshire =

Healthcare in Wiltshire, England, is largely the responsibility of the Bath and North East Somerset, Swindon and Wiltshire integrated care board (ICB), which covers the local authority areas of Bath and North East Somerset, Swindon and Wiltshire. The unitary authorities – Wiltshire Council and Swindon Borough Council – are responsible for aspects of community health provision.

== History ==
=== Prior to 2022 ===
Victoria Hospital in Swindon was established in 1887, at first with 12 beds, increasing to 22 by 1904; it finally closed in 2007.

From 1947 to 1974, NHS services in Wiltshire were managed by the South-West Metropolitan Regional Hospital Board (covering New Sarum, Wilton, and the rural districts of Amesbury, Mere and Tisbury, and Salisbury and Wilton), and by Oxford Regional Hospital Board (Marlborough and Swindon). In 1965, a new board was formed for Wessex which covered the boroughs of New Sarum and Wilton and the rural districts of Amesbury, Mere and Tisbury, and Salisbury and Wilton.

In 1974 the boards were abolished and replaced by regional health authorities, with the whole of Wiltshire coming under the Wessex RHA, which covered a large area of Southern England encompassing 200 hospitals. Regions were reorganised in 1996, and Dorset was transferred to the South and West Regional Health Authority. Wiltshire had three area health authorities: Wiltshire, Salisbury and Swindon, from 1974 until 1994 when it was united into one authority for Bath and Wiltshire. Regional health authorities were reorganised and renamed strategic health authorities in 2002; Wiltshire was part of Avon, Gloucestershire and Wiltshire SHA. In 2006 regions were again reorganised and Wiltshire came under NHS South West until that was abolished in 2013. There was one primary care trust for the county.

Bath, Swindon and Wiltshire formed a sustainability and transformation plan area in March 2016, chaired from December 2019 by Stephanie Elsy, a former leader of Southwark Council.

=== Commissioning prior to 2022 ===
Bath and North East Somerset, Swindon and Wiltshire clinical commissioning group (CCG) was formed in April 2020 by merging three CCGs which covered Bath and North East Somerset, Swindon and Wiltshire. At that time the combined CCG had an annual budget of £1.3 billion and served a population of 934,000 across an area of 1,511 square miles (3,910 km^{2}). The CCG's headquarters were in Chippenham and it had offices in Bath, Devizes and Swindon. Its chief executive was Tracey Cox, formerly a manager at Bath and North East Somerset Primary Care Trust and then the corresponding CCG.

Swindon CCG agreed in June 2015 to fund a community therapy team at the Prospect Hospice, providing occupational and physiotherapy at home, in order to reduce pressure on hospital beds. Wiltshire CCG expected a £23 million funding gap in 2016/17 and to miss its financial target by £4.8m in 2015/6. Consequently it capped the amount of planned care delivered in hospitals, limited the number of funded procedures, and recovered money from drug companies.

=== Since 2022 ===
In July 2022, integrated care boards (ICBs) were established throughout NHS England to plan and deliver health and care services, replacing CCGs. Wiltshire is covered by the board for Bath and North East Somerset, Swindon and Wiltshire, which is branded as BSW Together. Stephanie Elsy continued in the new role of ICB chair, and Sue Harriman – formerly a nurse and chief executive of Solent NHS Trust – was appointed as the first chief executive of the ICB.

The ICB is required to work with local authorities to create an integrated care partnership (ICP) committee, to include local organisations such as the voluntary sector and social enterprises. The ICP works on prevention, wider social and economic factors affecting health, and reducing health inequalities. The first ICP chair, appointed in 2022, is Richard Clewer (leader of Wiltshire Council from 2021 to 2025).

== Primary care ==
As of April 2020, there were 22 GP practices in Swindon and 49 in Wiltshire; the CCG's 94 practices are grouped into 23 primary care networks. Out-of-hours services are provided by Medvivo.

== Community care ==
Community child health services commissioned by Wiltshire Council, including children’s specialist community nursing, health visiting, speech and language therapy, and parenting programmes, have been run by HCRG Care Group since April 2016 (until 2021 under the company's former name, Virgin Care). They were formerly run by five separate NHS organisations. HCRG's contract was renewed in 2023 to continue until at least 2029.

Swindon Borough Council and Swindon Clinical Commissioning Group set up a contract with SEQOL, a newly formed community interest company, to provide a variety of adult social care services in 2011. The council paid £9.4 million and the CCG £17 million a year. In March 2016, they decided not to renew the contract because of performance problems: in 2014-15 the average daily rate, per 100,000 population, of delayed hospital discharges from hospital attributable to social care was 6.9 in Swindon, compared to a national average of 3.7. SEQOL requested to end their involvement without completing the 12 months' notice provided in the contract, and from October 2016, Great Western Hospitals NHS Foundation Trust were responsible for these services. SEQOL's staff returned to employment by the hospital or the council, and the company intended to cease trading.

From April 2022, community cardiology services in Wiltshire are provided by Wiltshire Health and Care LLP, who already ran community hospitals in the county. These services include diagnostics, assessment and advice, and rehabilitation of heart failure patients.

== Mental health ==
Avon and Wiltshire Mental Health Partnership NHS Trust (AWP) provides adult mental health and related services in Wiltshire and the former county of Avon, an area centered on Bristol.

From April 2010, Oxford Health NHS Foundation Trust has provided tiers 3 and 4 of Child and Adolescent Mental Health Services (CAMHS) in Wiltshire and Bath and North East Somerset following a competitive tender. Previously this service had been operated by three providers, though primarily AWP. The service is jointly funded by the NHS and local authorities.

== Hospital provision ==
Great Western Hospitals NHS Foundation Trust and Salisbury NHS Foundation Trust are the main acute providers in the county. In June 2018 they agreed to form an alliance with Royal United Hospitals Bath NHS Foundation Trust, as they provide most of the hospital services in the Bath, North East Somerset, Swindon and Wiltshire sustainability and transformation plan area. Effective November 2024, Cara Charles-Barks – chief executive of the Bath trust – was appointed as the joint chief executive of the three trusts.

Community hospitals at Chippenham, Devizes, Melksham, Marlborough (Savernake), Trowbridge and Warminster are run since 2016 by Wiltshire Health and Care LLP. The Chippenham and Trowbridge hospitals have minor injuries units.
