= Healthcare in Northamptonshire =

Healthcare in Northamptonshire was the responsibility of Northamptonshire Clinical Commissioning Group until July 2022, with some involvement of Cambridgeshire and Peterborough CCG.

== History ==
From 1947 to 1974 NHS services in Northamptonshire were managed by the Oxford Regional Hospital Board. In 1974 the boards were abolished and replaced by regional health authorities. Northamptonshire came under the Oxford RHA. Regions were reorganised in 1996 and Northamptonshire came under the Anglia and Oxford Regional Health Authority. From 1974 there was one area health authority covering the county. From 1982 there were two district health authorities, Kettering and Northampton, but they were merged in 1993. Three primary care trusts were established in the county in 2002: Daventry and South Northamptonshire PCT, Northampton Teaching PCT and Northamptonshire Heartlands PCT. They were merged into Northamptonshire Teaching PCT in 2006. They were managed by the Leicestershire, Northamptonshire and Rutland Strategic Health Authority which was merged into NHS East Midlands in 2006.

== Sustainability and transformation plans ==
Northamptonshire formed a sustainability and transformation plan area in March 2016 with John Wardell, the Accountable Officer of Nene Clinical Commissioning Group, as its leader In May 2018 the partnership, which had been rated “in need of improvement” by NHS England in 2017, produced a list of “helpful” and “unhelpful” behaviours for its board members and planned to hold a “reconciliation event” hoping to override all individual or organisational self-interest. It was unclear whether this difficulty was related to the financial difficulty of Northamptonshire County Council.

== Primary care ==
Two practices in the county were in Cambridgeshire and Peterborough Clinical Commissioning Group. The remaining 74 were in Northamptonshire CCG, including Lakeside Surgery, the biggest general practice in the National Health Service with 62 partners. The CCGs were replaced by integrated care systems in July 2022.

Out-of-hours services are provided in the county by Integrated Care 24 Limited.

In July 2024, Alliance Medical and Whites Traffic Management delivered and installed the Kings Heath Community Diagnostic Centre adjacent to Kings Heath General Practice. This location provides localised access to MRI, CT, and other diagnostic scans.

== Acute services ==
Kettering General Hospital NHS Foundation Trust and Northampton General Hospital NHS Trust are the main acute providers in the county.

== Mental health and community services ==
Mental health and community services are provided by Northamptonshire Healthcare NHS Foundation Trust, including community nursing and therapy services.

Northamptonshire Healthcare NHS Foundation Trust in conjunction with the county council set up a new organisation, First for Wellbeing, in November 2015 to provide public health services including debt advice, smoking cessation and weight management. Badby Park is a specialist provider of care for people with long term conditions.

== Healthwatch ==
There is a Healthwatch organisation in Northamptonshire.

== See also ==
- Category:Health in Northamptonshire
- Healthcare in the United Kingdom
