= Healthcare in Nottinghamshire =

Healthcare in Nottinghamshire was, until July 2022, the responsibility of six clinical commissioning groups, covering Nottingham City, Nottingham North & East, Mansfield and Ashfield, Newark and Sherwood, Rushcliffe, and Nottingham West. They planned to merge in April 2020.

== History ==
From 1947 to 1974 NHS services in Nottinghamshire were managed by the Sheffield Regional Hospital Board. In 1974 the boards were abolished and replaced by regional health authorities. Northamptonshire came under the Trent RHA. From 1974 there was one area health authority covering the county. From 1982 there were three district health authorities, Bassetlaw, Nottingham and Central Nottinghamshire. In 1992 Bassetlaw and Central Nottinghamshire were merged into North Nottinghamshire. Eight primary care trusts were established in the county in 2002: Ashfield, Broxtowe and Hucknall, Gedling, Mansfield District, Newark and Sherwood, Nottingham City, and Rushcliffe. All but Nottingham City were merged into Nottinghamshire County Teaching PCT in 2006. They were managed by the East Midlands Strategic Health Authority which was merged into NHS East Midlands in 2006.

== Sustainability and transformation plans ==
Nottinghamshire formed a sustainability and transformation plan area in March 2016 with David Pearson, the Director of Adult Social Care at Nottinghamshire County Council as its leader. Nottingham City, Nottingham North East, Nottingham West and Rushcliffe CCGs appointed a common Chief Accountable Officer in September 2017 in what is seen as a move to a single commissioning model for Greater Nottingham. In November 2018 Amanda Sullivan, accountable officer for Mansfield and Ashfield CCG and Newark and Sherwood CCG, was appointed accountable officer for all six CCGs.

The area faces a projected 2020/21 financial gap of £628 million and is proposing to reduce beds over two years at Nottingham University Hospital by 200 and 20 at Sherwood Forest Hospital. It aims for an increase of 10% in primary care and self-care activity. A single leader is appointed by the four greater Nottingham clinical commissioning groups who will be “responsible for setting the direction of healthcare commissioning for the area”. Wendy Saviour was appointed managing director of the accountable care system - the first such appointment. She will be employed by NHS England and will be responsible for NHS England oversight and assurance. The area includes eight local authorities, six clinical commissioning groups and a large number of NHS and other providers and is developing an accountable care system.

A £2.7 million contract was awarded to Capita to develop an accountable care system in July 2017. Capita have subcontracted much of the work to Centene UK. Local GPs gave Capita a vote of no confidence claiming it does not have the expertise to make necessary transformations in-house. It is hoped to learn from Centene's work with Ribera Salud in Alzira, Valencia.

So far it has established:

- Better Together integrated primary and acute care systems vanguard in Mid Nottinghamshire, covers 330,000 people with 41 GP practices set up in 2014.
- Principia multispecialty community provider in Rushcliffe which covers a population of around 126,000 in coterminous borough and CCG 12 GP practices.
- Nottingham City CCG care home vanguard which covers 28 residential homes and 24 nursing homes with a total of 2,050 beds.

In March 2018 Tracy Taylor, the new chief executive of Nottingham University Hospitals NHS Trust said plans to reduce hospital beds by 200 should be reviewed because winter had exposed the lack of capacity at the trust and in the community to manage the increasing acuity of patients. She said the 200 beds "could be sub-acute and rehab in the community… it might be that we wouldn't need them in the hospital.” There had been a 30% increase in respiratory admissions which had filled up two surgical wards.

Nottingham City Council pulled out of what is now called the integrated care system, complaining about a lack of “democratic oversight” in November 2018, but rejoined in 2019 after agreement that it could veto “proposals that may result in privatisation or outsourcing”.

== Commissioning ==
The Nottingham Treatment Centre was established in 2008. It provides outpatients, surgery, diagnostic testing and pregnancy services and is run by Circle Health at a cost of £67 million a year in 2017-18. In 2018 Rushcliffe Clinical Commissioning Group, which commissioned the service on behalf of the other CCGs proposed a new contract for three years with a value of £50m a year. Circle refused to bid, saying this did not provide a “sustainable basis” to deliver services and threatened litigation, as there had not been any meaningful public consultation.

== Primary care ==
Out-of-hours services are provided in the south of the county by NEMS Community Benefit Services Limited, by Nottinghamshire Healthcare NHS Foundation Trust in Bassetlaw, and by Central Nottinghamshire Clinical Services for the remainder.

== Acute services ==
Doncaster and Bassetlaw Teaching Hospitals NHS Foundation Trust, Nottingham University Hospitals NHS Trust and Sherwood Forest Hospitals NHS Foundation Trust are the main acute providers in the county. A merger between Nottingham University Hospitals NHS Trust and Sherwood Forest Hospitals NHS Foundation Trust was proposed, but in November 2016 it was announced that this would not proceed.

In February 2018 it was reported that the Greater Nottinghamshire health economy was on OPEL level 4 (a major crisis requiring external intervention either regionally or nationally) with the system at a “complete operational standstill” because of insufficient bed capacity, even though extra 120 community beds were opened in January.

== Community care and mental health ==
Mid Nottinghamshire Better Together a Multispecialty community provider, has supported a reduction of 107 acute hospital beds and is hoped to deliver savings of more than £46 million by 2019 for an investment of £17.3 million. Nottinghamshire Healthcare NHS Foundation Trust is the main NHS mental health provider.
