= Healthcare in Leicestershire =

Healthcare in Leicestershire was the responsibility of three clinical commissioning groups covering West Leicestershire, Leicester City and East Leicestershire and Rutland until July 2022. As far as the NHS is concerned Rutland is generally treated as part of Leicestershire.

== History ==
From 1947 to 1974 NHS services in Leicestershire were managed by the Sheffield Regional Hospital Board. In 1974 the boards were abolished and replaced by regional health authorities. Leicestershire came under the Trent RHA. Regions were reorganised in 1996 and Leicestershire came under the West Midlands Regional Health Authority. From 1974 there was an area health authority covering the county. From 1982 there was one district health authority. Eight primary care trusts were established in the county in 2002: Eastern Leicester PCT, Leicester City West PCT, Leicestershire County and Rutland PCT, Charnwood & North West Leicestershire PCT, Hinckley and Bosworth PCT, Melton, Rutland & Harborough PCT, and South Leicestershire PCT. They were merged into two: Leicester City PCT and Leicestershire County and Rutland PCT in 2006. They were managed by the Leicestershire, Northamptonshire and Rutland Strategic Health Authority which was merged into NHS East Midlands in 2006.

== Sustainability and transformation plans ==
In March 2016 Toby Sanders (Accountable Officer of NHS West Leicestershire Clinical Commissioning Group) was appointed the leader of the Leicester, Leicestershire and Rutland Sustainability and transformation plan footprint.

The plans envisaged closing all the acute beds at Leicester General Hospital. The University Hospitals of Leicester NHS Trust would have a net reduction of 243 acute beds. Maternity services in Leicester and Melton Mowbray will be consolidated onto one site at the Royal Infirmary. The in-patient facilities at Fielding Palmer Community Hospital in Lutterworth and Rutland Memorial Community Hospital in Oakham would close. In 2017, Leicestershire was one of the areas piloting a new accountable care system which was proposed to involve two NHS trusts, three clinical commissioning groups, three local councils, the local ambulance service provider, and social enterprise Derbyshire Health United.

Leaders of Leicester City Council, Leicestershire County Council and Rutland County Council complained in September 2017 that plans were being concocted in secret with no public involvement or scrutiny and threatened to withdraw cooperation. Progress has been described as hesitant and secretive.

A virtual 256-bed ‘hospital’ called Intensive Community Support has been established with staff of about 170 organised in five joint teams of district nurses, community mental health nurses, GPs and social workers focused on keeping patients out of hospital. Each team has about 50 beds in patients' own homes. On average it supports a patient for about ten days. There are also plans to move 150,000 outpatient appointments out of hospitals into primary care settings. Setting this up was supposed to permit the closure of 65 acute beds, but in March 2018 they had not closed, the hospital trust saying it was short of 105 beds.

In 2018 it was announced that staff at the University Hospitals of Leicester NHS Trust would be cut by 1500, while primary care staff would be increased by 234.

The three clinical commissioning groups decided to appoint a single accountable officer and management team in December 2018 with a view to a merger.

== Commissioning ==
Leicestershire Health and Wellbeing Board places stress on the importance of housing and has put a housing specialist in Leicestershire Partnership Trust’s Bradgate Unit and three housing support officers at Leicester Royal Infirmary. Blaby District Council hosts a team of technical housing and grants officers, occupational therapists and adaptations specialists which is to be extended to the whole county.

The number of over-85s in the county is forecast to grow by 187% by the late 2030s.

== Primary care ==
Out-of-hours services are provided in the county by Central Nottinghamshire Clinical Services and in the city by Derbyshire Health United. There are 568 GPs in Leicestershire and Rutland.

== Acute services ==
Hospital care is largely provided by the University Hospitals of Leicester NHS Trust. In 2022 the integrated care partnership announced plans to develop virtual wards, supported by Spirit Health. Their remote monitoring platform, Clinitouch, will support health specialties including heart failure, frailty, and COVID-19.

== Mental health and community services ==
Mental health services are provided by Leicestershire Partnership NHS Trust and Nottinghamshire Healthcare NHS Foundation Trust. The Sustainability and transformation plan envisages a cut of 40%, £29 million, to the NHS Continuing healthcare programme which supports more than 1300 patients in the county.

== Healthwatch ==
There are two Healthwatch organisations, one for Leicestershire and one for Leicester. Their main objective is to inform the local health and social care committees and boards of the community's opinions. They include Healthwatch representatives - delegates that represent the voice of society. Healthwatch representatives monitor service delivery in Leicestershire and Leicester through concerns and feedback.

Rutland has its own organisation.

== See also ==
- Category:Health in Leicestershire
- Healthcare in the United Kingdom
