= Royal United Hospital =

- Royal United Hospitals Bath NHS Foundation Trust
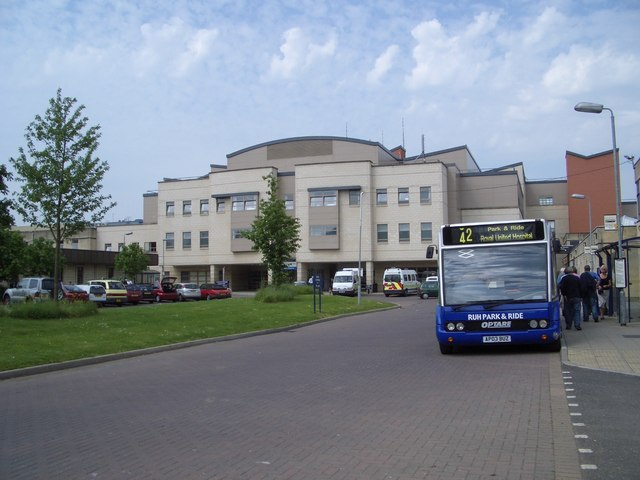
- Royal United Hospital

- Shown in Somerset

Geography
- Location: Bath, Somerset, England
- Coordinates: 51.3917°N 2.3910°W

Organisation
- Care system: NHS
- Type: Teaching, District General
- Affiliated university: University of Bath and the University of the West of England

Services
- Emergency department: Yes
- Beds: 565

Helipads
- Helipad: Yes

History
- Founded: 1826

Links
- Website: www.ruh.nhs.uk
- Lists: Hospitals in England

The Royal United Hospital (RUH) is a major acute district general hospital in the Weston suburb of Bath, England, which lies approximately 1.5 miles (2.4 km) west of the city centre. The hospital has 565 beds and occupies a 52-acre (21 ha) site, which it shares with the Royal National Hospital for Rheumatic Diseases. The hospital provides a comprehensive range of acute services including accident and emergency, paediatrics and maternity. There is an air ambulance landing point on the adjacent Lansdown Cricket Club field.

The hospital was formed in 1826 by the union of two 18th-century charitable hospitals in Bath, and moved to its current location in 1932. It is operated by the Royal United Hospitals Bath NHS Foundation Trust.

== History ==
=== Founding ===
The Royal United Hospital takes its name from the union of the Bath Casualty Hospital founded in 1788, and the Bath City Dispensary and Infirmary founded in 1792. The Casualty Hospital was founded in response to the serious injuries sustained to labourers working on the buildings which were being constructed in the city. The Dispensary and Infirmary developed from the Bath Pauper Scheme, a charity founded in 1747 to provide medical treatment for destitute persons in Bath.

The combined institution opened in a building designed by John Pinch the elder in Beau Street as the Bath United Hospital in 1826. It was awarded the title "Royal" by Queen Victoria in 1864 when a new wing, named the Albert Wing after the recently deceased Prince Consort, opened. This building was later occupied by Bath College.

=== Combe Park site ===
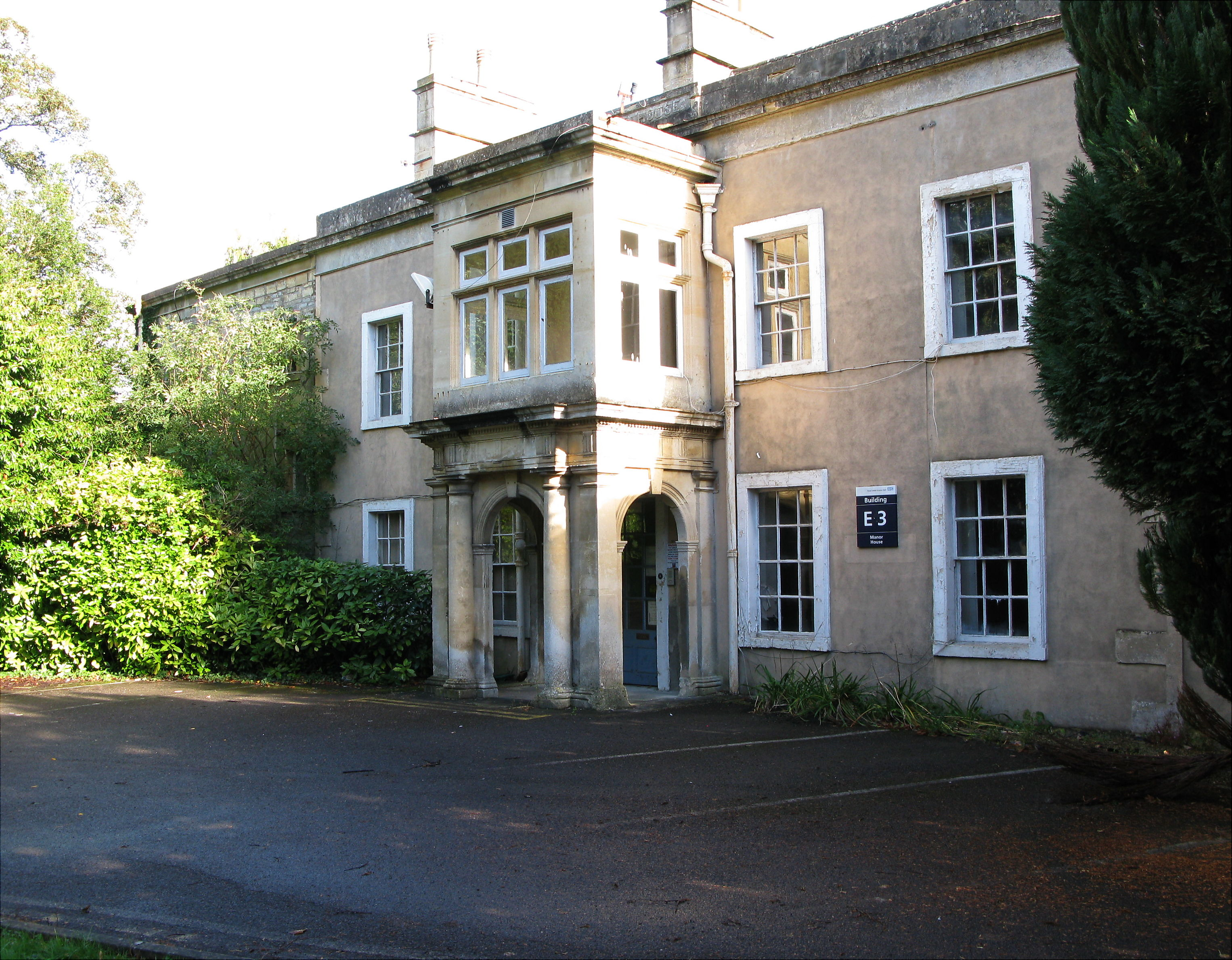
Front of former Manor House

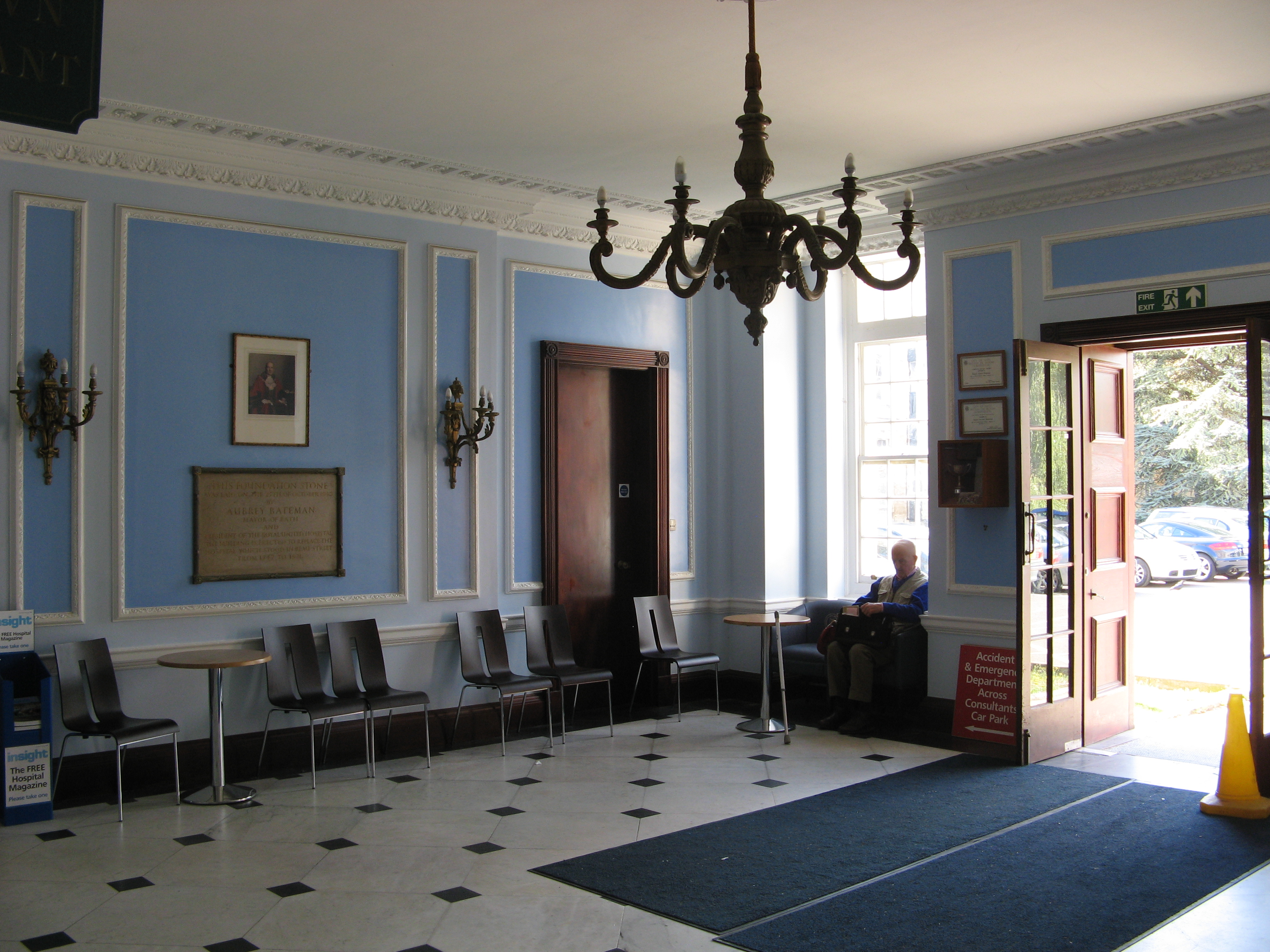
The original hospital foyer, showing 1930 building foundation stone

The hospital moved to its present site, Combe Park, on 11 December 1932. The site had previously been used for the large First World War Bath War Hospital, which opened in 1916. In November 1919, it was renamed the Bath Ministry of Pensions Hospital, which it remained until it closed in 1929.

The site was also used by the Forbes Fraser Hospital and the Bath and Wessex Orthopaedic Hospital, both founded in 1924 and which merged into the RUH about 1980. The former manor house on the site, originally medieval but remodelled in the 18th century, became an administrative building. The building is a Grade II* listed building due to its fine Adam style interior.

In 1959, the hospital absorbed the Ear Nose and Throat Hospital and in 1973, the Bath Eye Infirmary, both located elsewhere in Bath.

In July 2011, the Dyson Centre for neonatal care opened for premature babies. Over half of the £6.1 million cost was raised by the hospital's charity, the Forever Friends Appeal.

=== 2014 redevelopment ===
In 2008, plans were revealed for a £100M redevelopment of the pre-Second World War RUH North buildings, which would include an increase in single-occupancy rooms in line with Government targets. In 2014, a five-year £110M development plan was confirmed; it included a new cancer centre, pharmacy, integrated therapies unit, pathology block, IT centre and 400 extra public car parking spaces.

=== Royal National Hospital for Rheumatic Diseases ===
In 2015 and 2016, some services were transferred from the Royal National Hospital for Rheumatic Diseases to the RUH, including endoscopy and children's services, following that hospital's takeover by the RUH Trust. Construction started on a dedicated building at the RUH site in November 2017. The last rheumatic diseases services were transferred to the RUH site in autumn 2019.

=== Sulis Hospital, Peasedown ===
Sulis Hospital at Peasedown St John, about 6 miles (10 km) south of the Combe Park site, provides both NHS and privately-funded treatment and operates as a subsidiary of the RUH. The hospital was built in 2010 by Circle Health and bought by the NHS in 2021.

== Services ==
The hospital provides acute treatment and care (including Accident & Emergency) for a catchment population of around 500,000 people in Bath and the surrounding towns and villages in North East Somerset and west Wiltshire. Health and care services in the area are planned and delivered by the Bath and North East Somerset, Swindon and Wiltshire integrated care system.

The Avon and Wiltshire Mental Health Partnership offers services at Hillview Lodge on the north of the site and at Bath NHS House to the south of the site.

== Notable people ==
- Melanie Hall, clerical officer who was studying to become a nurse. Presumed murdered.
- Stuart Farrimond, a BBC science communicator, best-selling author, and former doctor at the hospital.

== See also ==
- Healthcare in Somerset
- List of hospitals in England
