= Salisbury District Hospital =

Hospital in Salisbury, England

- Salisbury NHS Foundation Trust
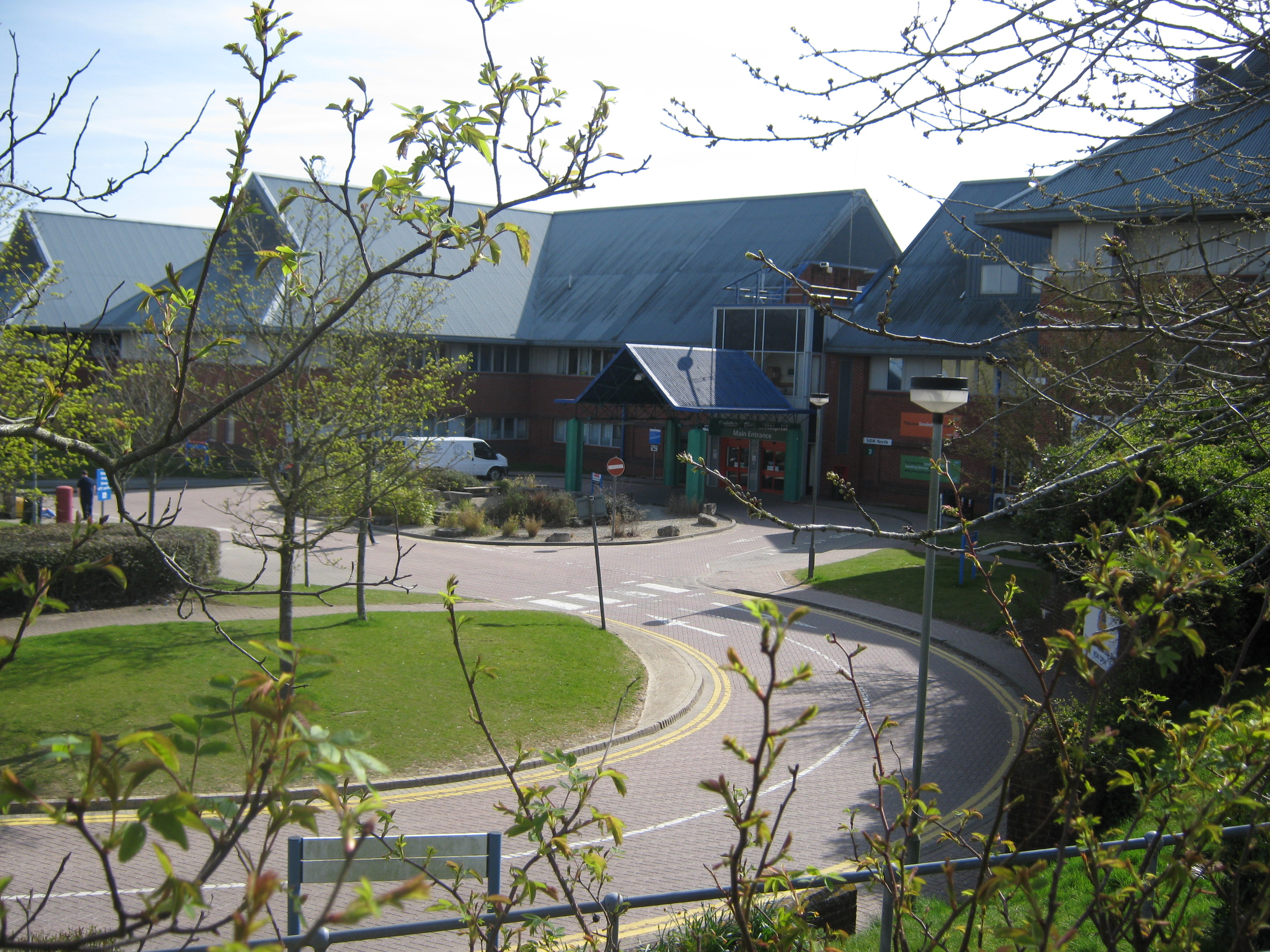
- Main entrance, viewed from the west

- Shown in Wiltshire

Geography
- Location: Salisbury, Wiltshire, England
- Coordinates: 51.045°N 1.788°W

Organisation
- Care system: NHS England
- Type: District General

Services
- Emergency department: Yes
- Beds: 464 (April 2016)

History
- Founded: 1942

Links
- Website: www.salisbury.nhs.uk

Salisbury District Hospital is a large hospital on Odstock Road, Britford, Wiltshire, England, about 1 1/2 miles (2.4 km) south of the centre of the city of Salisbury. It is managed by the Salisbury NHS Foundation Trust.

== History ==
The first Odstock Hospital was constructed in Britford parish in 1942 by the United States Army to treat American troops who were stationed in the Salisbury area during the Second World War. A specialist burns unit, rehabilitation department and Macmillan Cancer Unit were built there after the war. A spinal injuries treatment centre was officially opened by the Prince and Princess of Wales in 1984.

A new hospital, known as Salisbury District Hospital, was built on the site to replace the old Odstock Hospital, the Salisbury Infirmary in Fisherton Street and Newbridge Hospital (also on Odstock Road), which had provided care for the elderly. The new hospital was officially opened by the Duchess of Kent in 1991.

In March 2018, retired Colonel Sergei Skripal (a former agent for Russia who then provided assistance to Britain and was caught and imprisoned by Russia and later freed in a spy swap), and his daughter, Yulia, were treated at Salisbury District Hospital after they were found poisoned by a substance thought to be a Novichok agent.

== Services ==
In 2016 the hospital had over 4,000 members of staff and provided services to around 240,000 people in the counties of Wiltshire, Dorset and Hampshire. It also has the longest running Skin Laser Clinic in the country.

== Archives ==
The Trust's arts department, ArtCare, was awarded a Heritage Lottery Fund grant in 2016 toward a two-year project to conserve and digitise the hospital's collection of historic material.

== See also ==
- Healthcare in Wiltshire
- List of hospitals in England
