= Barbara Hewson =

Irish barrister (1961–2021)

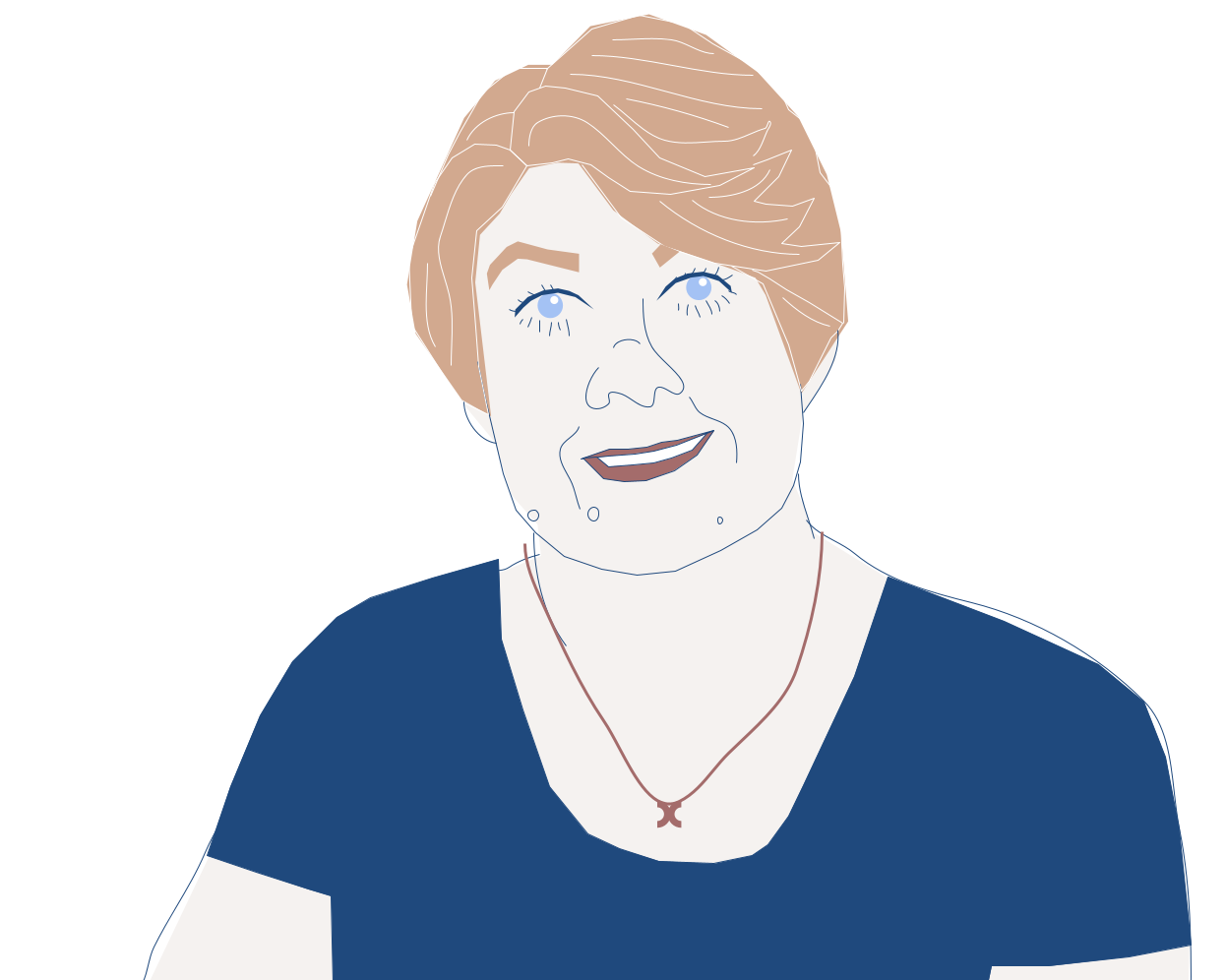
- Born: Barbara Mary Hewson; 2 June 1961
- Died: 9 January 2021 (aged 59); Galway, County Galway, Ireland
- Education: Trinity Hall, University of Cambridge
- Occupations: Barrister; writer

Barbara Mary Hewson (1961 – 9 January 2021) was an Anglo-Irish barrister with a practice in public law in both the Republic of Ireland and the United Kingdom. Hewson specialised in Court of Protection work, human rights, judicial review, and regulatory defence cases. She was interested in reproductive health and the rights of pregnant women, the mentally incapacitated and the mentally ill.

A controversial advocate for lowering the age of consent, in the wake of the Jimmy Savile scandal to end the "persecution of old men", the removal of anonymity in sexual abuse cases and the ending of Operation Yewtree, she was suspended from practice for two years for offensive social media comments in December 2019, a suspension later reduced in light of her terminal illness.

== Education ==
Although born in Ireland, Barbara Hewson studied at St. Leonards-Mayfield School, Mayfield, East Sussex (1972–79). She studied English at Trinity Hall, Cambridge (1979–83).

She earned her B.A. (Hons) later upgraded to an M.A as is customary for Oxford and Cambridge degrees. She obtained a Diploma in Law at the Polytechnic of Central London, now the University of Westminster. In 1985, she was called to the Bar of England and Wales. In 1987, Hewson began her career in the Chancery bar, doing cases about wills, land and trusts, and she then joined a chambers specialising in EC and public law.

== Practice profile ==
Hewson appeared in a number of high-profile cases. In the 1990s, she campaigned against court-ordered treatment of pregnant women, claiming that family courts were depriving women of fundamental rights to personal autonomy and to a fair trial. She was critical of the Court of Appeal's ruling in the case of Jodie and Mary, the Maltese conjoined twins, in 2002, and acted for anti-abortion campaigner Bruno Quintavalle in an unsuccessful bid to stop the twins' separation.

In Ireland, she appeared in a number of cases in the Four Courts in Dublin, notably concerning the home birth midwife Ann Kelly during 1997–2000, but also vulnerable adults.

In 2010, she acted for the family of David Gray at the inquest into Mr Gray's death following an overdose of Diamorphine, administered by locum German doctor Daniel Ubani, who had been recruited by Take Care Now. Coroner William Morris gave a verdict of gross negligence manslaughter, and made 11 Recommendations to the Department of Health to improve out-of-hours GP services. The Times profiled Hewson as its Lawyer of the Week on 11 February 2010.

== Affiliations ==
She had been a trustee of the British Pregnancy Advisory Service since 2007. She was made an Honorary Fellow of the University of Westminster in 2012. She was a founder-member of the Association of Women Barristers (AWB) in 1991. The same year, Hewson was elected to the Bar Council of England & Wales. As Press Officer for the AWB, she became known for commenting on a range of issues concerning women and the law in national media.

=== Views ===
Hewson was long opposed to state paternalism in the field of medical decision-making, and strongly supported patient autonomy. She supported abortion rights for women, and women's rights in childbirth, arguing that abortion should be removed from criminal law. She was a critic of Operation Yewtree.

== Controversies ==
=== 2013 ===
Hewson was involved in controversy in 2013, after the Press Officer of the National Society for the Prevention of Cruelty to Children (NSPCC) strongly urged her to remove or reword an article she had written for the online magazine Spiked on 8 May entitled "Yewtree is Destroying the Rule of Law," a few hours after it was published. Her article criticised the role of the NSPCC (which she called a "moral crusader") and the Metropolitan Police in treating complainants as "victims" in the wake of the Savile scandal, and the proliferation of prosecutions of elderly defendants. She had observed that the crimes of television presenter Stuart Hall (who had pleaded guilty to numerous charges of indecent assault) constituted misdemeanor offences, as opposed to crimes like rape and murder. She had proposed that there be a statute of limitations for criminal sex offences; that complainant anonymity be removed, and that the age of consent, which was raised by the Criminal Law (Amendment) Act 1885 should be changed back to the previous age of thirteen. Hewson rejected the NSPCC's demand, citing Article 10 of the European Convention on Human Rights. The NSPCC then said it would take this to news desks. The NSPCC proceeded to criticise Hewson for her opinions, calling them "out-dated and simply ill-informed." On the evening of 8 May 2013, her then chambers Hardwicke issued a statement proclaiming "shock" at her views in the Yewtree article for spiked.

Hewson stood by her article, invoking Voltaire. She received menacing messages, via social media, but also many messages of support via e-mail and bloggers, concerned by Operation Yewtree and supporting the principle of free speech. Brendan O'Neill, editor of Spiked, spoke out in Hewson's defence on BBC's Radio 5, saying "I published it because it's a fantastic article."

On 12 May 2013, Irish Independent columnist Eilis O'Hanlon commented: "The vehemence of the reaction against Barbara Hewson demonstrates that she was certainly right to compare the public mood around this issue to a witch-hunt, since it is in the nature of witch-hunts to not only shout down opposition, but also to attack what you think someone said, or what you wish they'd said, rather than what they did say."

Sociologist Frank Furedi stated that Hewson had been "morally lynched" for expressing her political opinions, and accused the NSPCC of "moral blackmail." Rod Liddle then criticised the NSPCC and Hardwicke in an article for The Spectator. Hewson was profiled in The Times' Law Section on 26 September 2013.

On 25 October 2013, Hewson was one of 100 women invited by the BBC to a day of debate and discussion about women's role in society.

On 30 October 2013, she debated the proposition "Is Rape Different?" at the London School of Economics (LSE) with Reader-in-Law Helen Reece, Prof. Jennifer Temkin, and Chief Crown Prosecutor Nazir Afzal, arguing that women should resist special treatment in such cases on equality grounds.

Some feminist academics later attacked Hewson's and Reece's role in the debate. Their reaction was criticised by the Law Editor of Spiked, who had attended the debate. Hewson then wrote an article for Spiked amplifying her views.

In 2019, she was suspended from practising for two years for offensive social media comments in December 2019.

However, Mr Justice Pepperall later reduced the suspension to one year but said it was based on "significant evidence of additional mitigating circumstances" in Hewson's terminal cancer diagnosis which were not before the Bar tribunal. In this way, Hewson died with her bar privileges intact.
