= Great Western Hospital =

- Great Western Hospitals NHS Foundation Trust
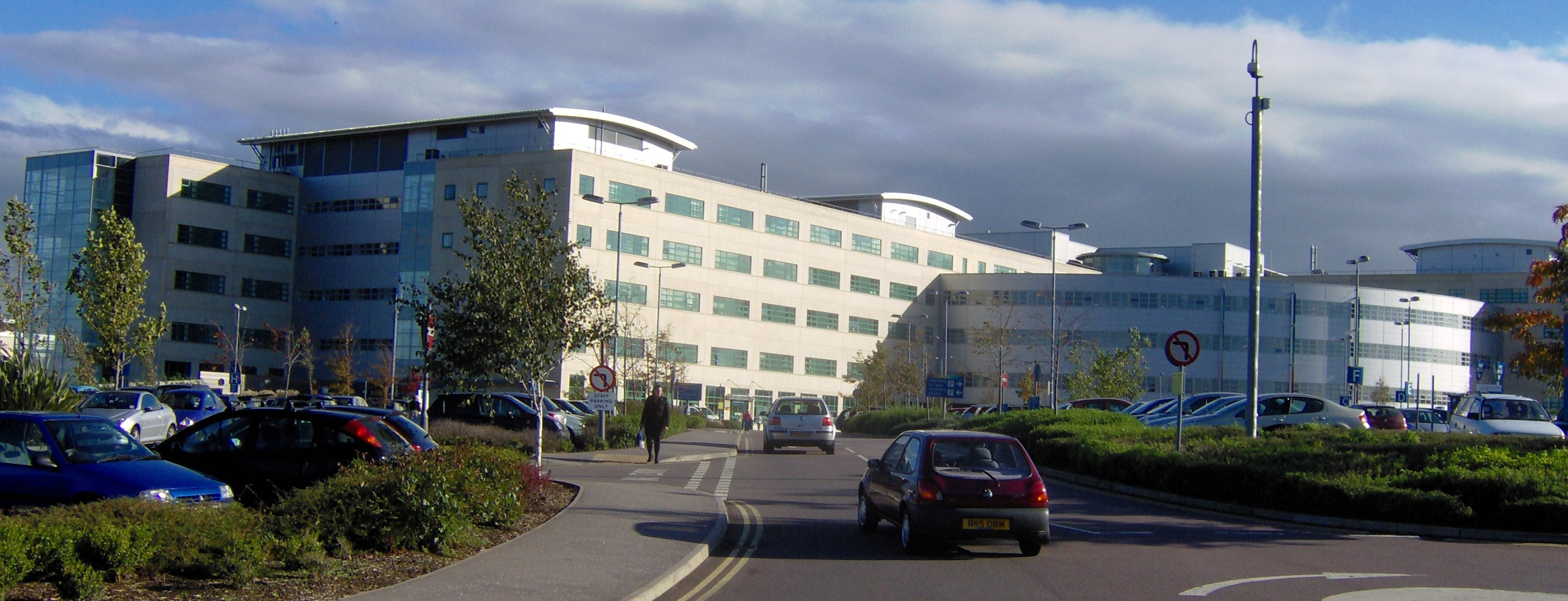
- Great Western Hospital

- Shown in Wiltshire

Geography
- Location: Swindon, Wiltshire, England, United Kingdom
- Coordinates: 51°32′19″N 1°43′41″W

Organisation
- Care system: NHS
- Type: District General

Services
- Emergency department: Yes Accident & Emergency

History
- Founded: 2002

Links
- Website: www.gwh.nhs.uk
- Lists: Hospitals in England

The Great Western Hospital is a large hospital in Swindon, Wiltshire, England, near junction 15 of the M4 motorway. It opened in 2002 and is run by the Great Western Hospitals NHS Foundation Trust.

== History ==
The original hospital in Swindon was the Princess Margaret Hospital, in the Okus suburb to the south of the town, which started providing services to patients in 1960 but was not formally opened by Princess Margaret until April 1966. It has since been fully demolished.

The new hospital was procured under a Private Finance Initiative contract to replace the services previously provided at the Princess Margaret Hospital and St Margaret's Hospital at Stratton St Margaret in 1999. The architect for the new hospital was Whicheloe Macfarlane, who designed the hospital with a concrete frame. The outside of the building is covered in 7,600 square metres (82,000 sq ft) of cream coloured precast concrete cladding panels which attempt to replicate the appearance of Wiltshire stone. There are six floors providing a total of 55,000 square metres (590,000 sq ft) of floor space. It was built by Carillion at a cost of £148 million; it started providing services to patients on 3 December 2002 and was formally opened by Prince Philip, Duke of Edinburgh on 28 February 2003.

== Facilities ==
The facilities at the hospital include an accident and emergency department, an acute assessment unit, a twelve bedded intensive care / high dependency unit, a maternity unit, an intermediate care centre on site, a health and social care education centre called the Academy, and a wide range of wards and clinics, serving approximately 300,000 people.

== See also ==
- Healthcare in Wiltshire
- List of hospitals in England
- List of NHS trusts
