= Out-of-hours service =

NHS service

Out-of-hours services are the arrangements to provide access to healthcare at times when General Practitioner surgeries are closed; in the United Kingdom this is normally between 6.30pm and 8am on weekdays, at weekends, on Bank Holidays, and sometimes if the practice is closed for educational sessions.

Most Out-of-hours services in Scotland and Wales are provided directly by Health Boards. In Northern Ireland they are provided by the Health and Social Care Trusts. In England they are commissioned by integrated care systems, usually working together, as the contracts often cover large areas. Out-of-hours providers in England must be registered with, and are regulated by, the Care Quality Commission.

The contract for General medical services which most GPs work to requires practices to be responsible for their patients between 8 am and 6.30 pm from Monday to Friday. In some cities commercial deputising services were set up employing doctors to cover the out of hour’s period, paid by the practices in the area but these weren’t viable in much of the country.

== The GP Co-operatives prior to 2004 ==
Woodside Health Centre in Glasgow established a successful deputising service before 1973: “. . . twenty general practitioners group together to provide a highly organised system of out-of-hours health care … The telephone” (at the health centre) ”is permanently staffed and the patients are not involved in the delays of a post office diversion system. In the evening the telephone is answered by an experienced registered general nurse who can give advice where it is appropriate. In the event of a visit being required the nurse is able to contact the doctor on duty by radiotelephone. . . . . The patient’s previous notes are readily available to the nurse in the health centre and can be passed on to the doctor on duty. . . . Control of the system is exercised by a sub-committee of the health centre committee of management. The system thus has the advantages of a commercial deputising service in allowing doctors to have adequate time off duty, but control is exercised from within the health centre.”

The Royal Commission on the NHS in 1979 reported that commercially organised deputising services had grown rapidly over the last ten years and about one third of all GPs made some use of them. They received complaints that deputies lacked personal knowledge of the patient and access to the medical records, contacting the service could be difficult, and that deputies were slow in responding to emergencies

In 1994 after minor changes to the GP contract many groups of doctors got together and formed cooperative organisations sharing the out of hours calls between a large number of GPs on a rota basis. A minimum of about 40 GPs were needed to set up a successful cooperative. In 1996 the G-Docs out-of-hours cooperative in Grampian became Scotland’s first out-of-hours general practitioner service, financed by 200 GPs who each paid a monthly subscription.

The Carson Report published by the Department of Health in 2000 proposed quality standards which would apply not only to deputising services and Out-Of-Hours cooperatives but also to individual GPs & practices providing their own cover. Carson's proposal for “A new model of integrated out-of-hours provision ... accessed by patients via a single telephone call, routed in the first place through NHS Direct and passed, where necessary, to the appropriate provider of out-of-hours services in that locality.” eventually developed into NHS 111 and influenced the formulation of the 2004 GP contract.

Until the 2004 contract most GPs provided care for their patients outside those hours either themselves, or as part of a GP Co-operative. The total amount earmarked for Out of Hours duties including Night Visit Fees was an average of just under £6000 per GP per year.

== Changes after 2004 ==
The new contract passed the responsibility for organising out-of-hours services from individual doctors to the primary care trusts. Practices could opt out of the provision of out-of-hours services and lose the £6000 and most did. Some PCTs worked with the GP co-operatives, but some gave the contract to a commercial provider, commonly Harmoni or Serco both of which have been the subject of major complaints and of failing to employ sufficient doctors. By 2013 most of the co-operatives had converted to social enterprises. Many of the co-ops were involved in the provision of contracts to deliver NHS 111 services. According to John Horrocks, chief executive of Urgent Health UK, "It's not the same as it used to be, where everyone took their turn in a co-operative. It's more of a lifestyle choice. Now, you often find GPs who specialise in out-of-hours … typically, a shift rota is available on the internet and the GP is able to sign up to whatever shifts they want to work."

A study by the National Audit Office in July 2014 of people in England found that the urgent care system is complex and many people do not know how to contact out-of-hours GP services or even that such services exist; that 26% had not heard of out-of-hours GP services, and 19% had not heard of NHS 111.

Provision of out-of-hours services is a particular problem in remote locations. The Western Isles are an example of a remote area where new models of care are being trialled, with Community Unscheduled Care Nurses being deployed for patients who need to be visited at their place of residence.

David Cameron introduced plans to enable "hard working people ...to see their GP seven days a week and out of office hours" in September 2013. This promised access to GPs from 8am-8pm, and on Saturday and Sunday and to "test a variety of forward-thinking services to suit modern lifestyles, including greater use of Skype, email and phone consultations for those who would find it easier." Results from the GP Patient Survey, an independent poll run by Ipsos MORI on behalf of NHS England showed that extending opening hours and weekend opening were not a high priority for many patients. Long waits for appointments and failing to see a preferred, named doctor were more pressing issues. There was variation in demand for weekend opening with the highest demand in Windsor, Ascot and Maidenhead where some 28.1% of patients wanted surgeries open on Saturday but it was lowest in Wigan, where only 13.9% did.

In October 2014 GPs complained that the NHS 111 service had not been inspected by the Care Quality Commission and that it could jeopardise the safety of Out-of-hours services.

== Evaluation ==
In April 2015 Exeter Medical School used data from the official GP patient survey in England to score different types of providers out of 100. On speed, confidence and overall experience, scores from patients seen by commercial providers were lower. The score out of 100 for overall experience was 73 for NHS providers; 72 for not-for profit providers; 69 for the commercial sector. Prof John Campbell said the research showed that the poorest scores by providers were seen in the commercial sector.

== Commercial providers ==
Harmoni HS Ltd was a major provider of primary care, including out-of-hours services, which started as a GP co-operative and is now owned by Care UK. Take Care Now had contracts for services in Cambridgeshire, Suffolk, Great Yarmouth and Waveney, and Worcester. It was taken over by Harmoni. Care UK Clinical Services Limited now provides unscheduled care to over 15m patients. It runs out of hours services in Rotherham, Hampshire, Harrow, Hillingdon, Merton, Islington, Kingston, Wandsworth, Camden and Ealing.

IC24 provides services in East Sussex, Brighton & Hove, Kent, East Surrey and West Sussex.

Virgin Care provides services in Croydon

Medvivo provides services in Wiltshire.

Nestor Primecare Services Limited provided out of hours services in Mid Essex, Dudley, Sandwell, Heart of Birmingham, South Birmingham, Wolverhampton, Herefordshire, Scarborough, Sunderland in England and Abertawe Bro Morgannwg and Carmarthenshire in Wales but withdrew from its contracts in November 2018.

Serco had a contract to run out-of-hours services in Cornwall but NHS Kernow, the Clinical commissioning group, reached agreement with the firm to end the current contract at the end of May 2015 – 17 months early.

Zafash Medical Services Limited provides services in central London on a commercial basis outside the NHS.

Practice Plus Group runs the service in Gloucestershire.

Services including Now Healthcare and Push Doctor provide a nationwide commercial GP service that runs out of hours, weekends and bank holidays.

== Not for profit and NHS trust providers ==
- Birmingham & District General Practitioner Emergency Rooms (BADGER)
- Bardoc: Bury and Rochdale
- Barndoc Healthcare Ltd: Barnet, Enfield, Haringey & Brent
- Barts Health NHS Trust: Tower Hamlets
- Beacon Health Centre: Isle of Wight
- Bolton NHS Foundation Trust
- Bridgewater Community Healthcare NHS Foundation Trust Wigan
- Brisdoc: Bristol
- Central Nottinghamshire Clinical Services Leicestershire and Nottinghamshire
- Chorley Medics
- City & Hackney Urgent Healthcare Social Enterprise
- City Health Care Partnership CIC: Hull and Knowsley
- Core Care Links Limited: Grimsby
- Derbyshire Health United
- County Durham and Darlington NHS Foundation Trust.
- Cumbria Health on Call Ltd - rated outstanding following inspection by the Care Quality Commission in April 2017.
- Derbyshire Health United
- Devon Doctors
- East Berkshire Primary Care Out Of Hours Services Limited: Richmond
- East Cheshire NHS Trust
- East Lancashire Medical Services Limited
- Emdoc: Bromley
- East of England Ambulance Service NHS Trust: Norfolk
- GO To DOC: Manchester, Oldham and Sefton
- Grabadoc: Greenwich and Bexley
- Hampshire Doctors on Call Service
- HUC: HUC, Hertfordshire, Cambridgeshire & Peterborough, Luton & Bedfordshire
- Humber Teaching NHS Foundation Trust
- Hywel Dda GP Out of Hours Service: Pembrokeshire, Ceredigion, and Carmarthenshire
- Integrated Care 24 Limited: Brighton & Hove, Kent, Norfolk, East Surrey and Sussex, Northamptonshire, South Essex.
- KCW Co-operative: Kensington & Chelsea
- Local Care Direct (West Yorkshire and Craven)
- London Central and West Unscheduled Care Collaborative: Westminster, Ealing, Hounslow, and Hammersmith
- Mastercall Stockport and Trafford
- NEMS Community Benefit Services Limited (Nottingham)
- Newham GP Co-operative
- OWLS CIC Ltd (West Lancashire)
- Partnership of East London Co-operatives (PELC) Limited: Waltham Forest, Barking & Dagenham, Redbridge, Havering and West Essex,
- Salford Royal NHS Foundation Trust
- South Central Ambulance Service: Thames Valley
- South East London Doctors' Co-operative (SELDOC): Sutton, Lambeth, Southwark and Lewisham
- Shropdoc: Shropshire
- South Western Ambulance Service NHS Foundation Trust: Dorset
- Staffordshire Doctors Urgent Care part of Vocare
- South Essex Emergency Doctors Service
- Taurus Healthcare and Malling Health (UK) Limited (Walsall, Herefordshire, and Sandwell)
- Urgent Care 24 Limited: Liverpool, Halton and Knowsley
- Vocare (formerly Northern Doctors Urgent Care): Staffordshire, Northumberland, North Tyneside, Newcastle and South Tyneside, Cornwall
- Western Cheshire GP Out of Hours Service
- Wirral Community NHS Trust
- Yorkshire Ambulance Service
- Yorkshire Doctors Urgent Care

Urgent Health UK is a federation of Social Enterprise Unscheduled Primary Care Providers to which many of these organisations belong. According them in 2018 social enterprises were delivering out of hours services to 67% of patients in England, with an annual contract value of £294 million. Since 2008 the proportion delivered by NHS organisations has declined from 30% to 18% and that delivered by commercial providers dropped from 30% to 15%. Average annual funding per patient for social enterprise contracts is £7.62, for NHS organisations £8.10 and commercial organisations £8.22.

== Performance ==
Central Nottinghamshire Clinical Services was placed in Special Measures after an inspection by the Care Quality Commission in May 2015.

In February 2017 Pulse (magazine) reported that 10 of 104 providers who responded to a Freedom of Information request admitted that there had been overnight and weekend shifts over the past year with no GP cover. The biggest number of sessions were in Peterborough and Tower Hamlets.

In June 2019 it was reported that the service at Vale of Leven Hospital had been closed 50 times since December 2018 as no GPs were prepared to work.
