= TCN (disambiguation) =

TCN is a television station in Sydney, Australia, with initials standing for "Television Corporation New South Wales".

TCN may also refer to:

== Broadcast media ==
- The Comedy Network, a Canadian comedy TV channel owned by Bell Media
- The Country Network, an American TV channel broadcasting country music videos
- The Comcast Network, a regional sports network owned by Comcast broadcasting in the Eastern United States
- The Cartoon Network, a holding company for Cartoon Network and Adult Swim brands, owned by Warner Bros. Discovery
- True Crime Network, an American digital multicast network based on true crime shows, owned by Tegna Inc.
- Tucker Carlson Network, a subscription video on-demand streaming service launched December 2023

== Science and technology ==
- Tetracycline, an antibiotic used to treat conditions including cholera, brucellosis, plague, malaria and syphilis
- Train communication network, a fieldbus standard used in train control systems, described in IEC 61375
- Topology change notification in Spanning Tree Protocol, an Ethernet networking protocol
- Terrestrial Cosmogenic nuclide, rare isotope found on the earth surface

== Other uses ==
- The Chronicles of Narnia, a series of seven fantasy novels for children written by C. S. Lewis
- The Curling News, a sports publication first launched as Canadian Curling News
- Take Care Now, a provider of out-of-hours medical services in England, now defunct
- Transportation Communications Newsletter, an electronic newsletter published since 1998
- Third country national, a designation in migration contexts, or regarding public-sector contracts
