= Princess Margaret Hospital, Swindon =

Princess Margaret Hospital
- Shown in Wiltshire

Geography
- Location: Swindon, Wiltshire, England
- Coordinates: 51.5509°N 1.7989°W

Organisation
- Care system: NHS
- Type: District General

Services
- Emergency department: Yes

History
- Founded: 1966
- Closed: 2002

Links
- Lists: Hospitals in England

The Princess Margaret Hospital was a large hospital situated in Okus Road, Swindon, Wiltshire, England. It was managed by the Swindon and Marlborough NHS Trust.

== History ==
The hospital, which was built to replace the aging Victoria Hospital, was opened in phases: the outpatients department was opened in 1959 and the main block was opened by Princess Margaret in April 1966. It was the first purpose-built general hospital to be funded by the NHS. After services transferred to the Great Western Hospital, the Princess Margaret Hospital closed on 3 December 2002.

The building was demolished in 2004 and the 25-acre site was redeveloped as housing.

== See also ==
- Healthcare in Wiltshire
- List of hospitals in England
