= Kettering General Hospital =

- Kettering General Hospital NHS Foundation Trust
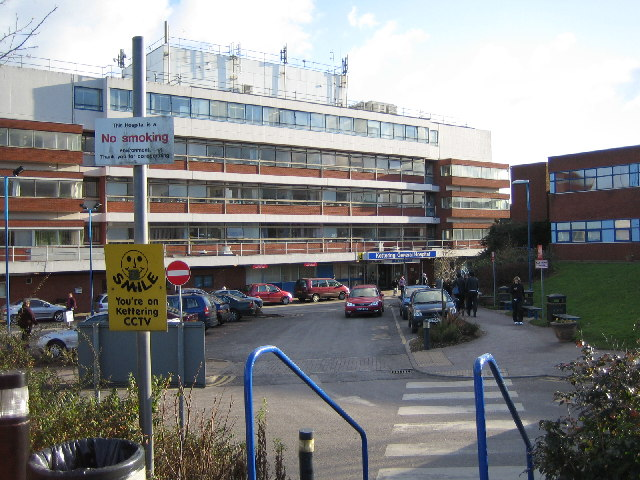
- Kettering General Hospital

- Location in Northamptonshire

Geography
- Location: Kettering, Northamptonshire, England, United Kingdom
- Coordinates: 52.4020°N 0.7414°W

Organisation
- Care system: Public NHS
- Type: District General

Services
- Emergency department: Yes Accident & Emergency
- Beds: 600

History
- Founded: 1897

Links
- Website: www.kgh.nhs.uk/kettering-general-hospital-main-site
- Lists: Hospitals in England

Kettering General Hospital is an NHS district hospital in Kettering, Northamptonshire, England. Mainly serving the unitary authority area of North Northamptonshire, it is managed by the Kettering General Hospital NHS Foundation Trust.

== History ==
The hospital, which replaced a small local dispensary, was opened after a fund-raising campaign by the Hon. Charles Spencer MP in October 1897. An operating theatre and extra consulting rooms opened in 1902, an X-ray department opened in 1905 and an eye department opened in 1908. It joined the National Health Service in 1948.

As part of a major redevelopment plan, a major new main ward block and Post-Graduate Education Centre were completed in 1976 and the new Rockingham Wing, for the treatment of maternity and gynecology patients, opened in 1977. A new accident and emergency department opened in 1993, the Centenary Wing opened in 2000 and the Jubilee Wing, for the treatment of dermatology patients, opened in 2003. The new Foundation Wing, which included children's and cardiac wards and a new intensive care unit, was completed in April 2013.

In 2021 the hospital was said to have the 'most cramped and limited emergency department in the UK'. It was allocated £46 million for an urgent care hub but the trust pleaded for £6 million in 2021/2 and £29m in 2022–23 to start making improvements to the department.
