= Great Western Hospitals NHS Foundation Trust =

Coordinates: 51.5490°N 1.7550°W

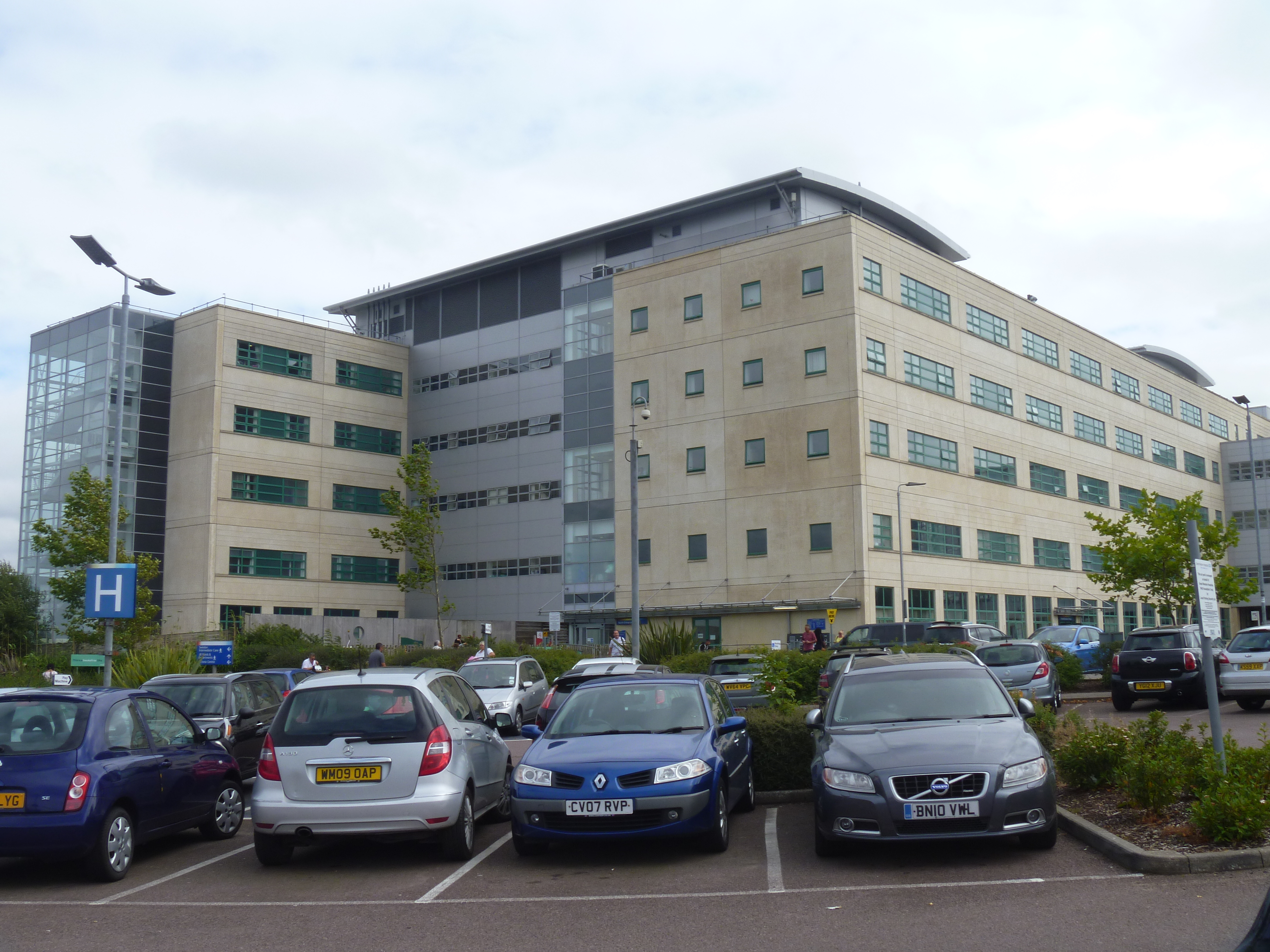
- Great Western Hospital, managed by Great Western Hospitals NHS Foundation Trust
- Former name: Swindon and Marlborough NHS Trust
- Type: NHS foundation trust
- Established: 1 December 2008
- Headquarters: Great Western Hospital, Marlborough Road, Swindon SN3 6BB
- Hospitals: Great Western Hospital
- Chair: Liam Coleman
- Chief executive: Cara Charles-Barks
- Website: www.gwh.nhs.uk

Great Western Hospitals NHS Foundation Trust runs the Great Western Hospital, a large hospital in Swindon, Wiltshire, England, near junction 15 of the M4 motorway.

== History ==
The Swindon and Marlborough NHS Trust became operational on 1 April 1994, managing Great Western Hospital from its opening in December 2002. The Trust's name changed to Great Western Hospitals on becoming a foundation trust in November 2008.

== Performance ==
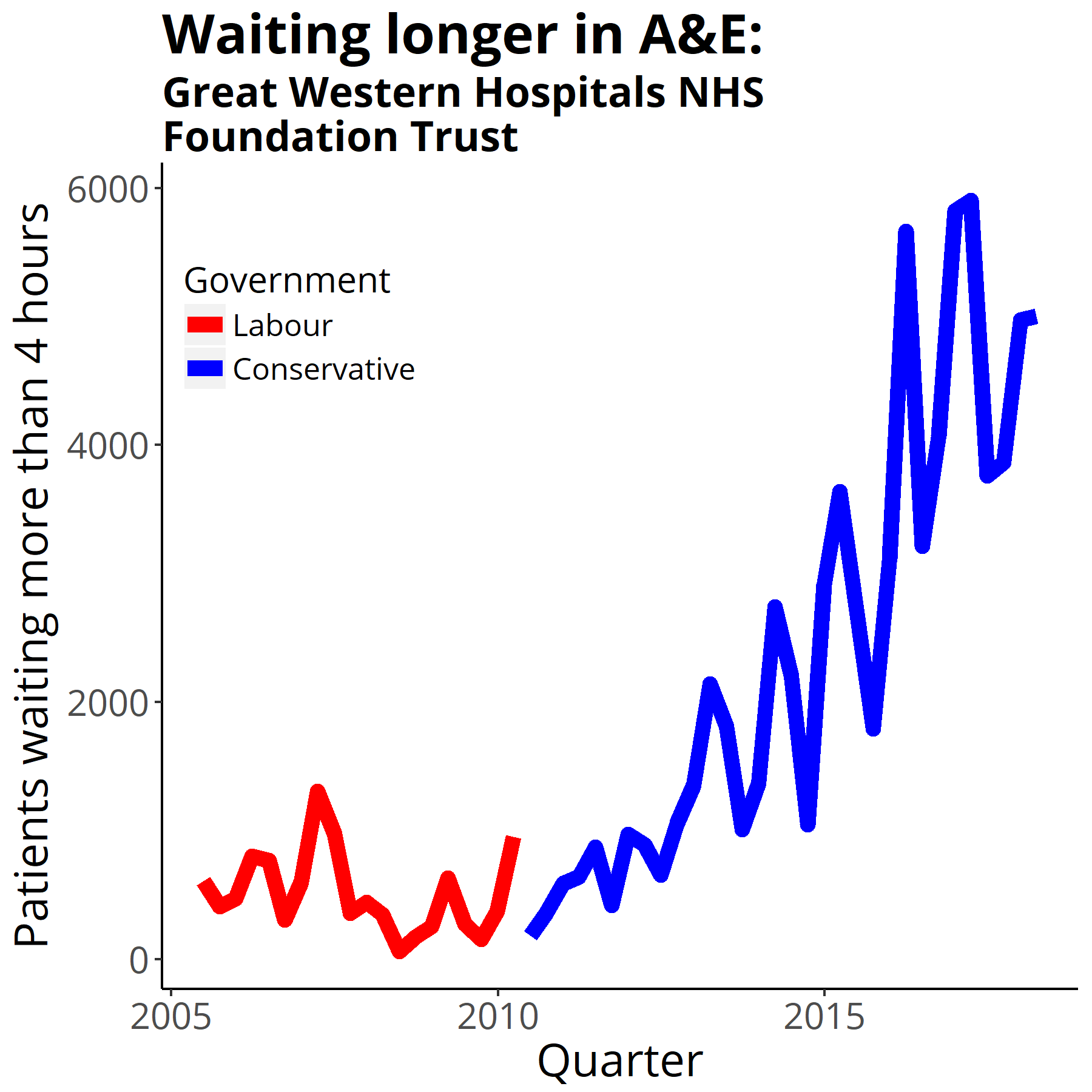
Performance against the four-hour target in the emergency department, 2005–2018

By 2005, the trust was one of the first to use the picture archiving and communication system of film-less x-rays, as part of the NHS's National Programme for IT.

The trust recorded a deficit of £17.4 million in 2013/4 and was expecting to end 2014/5 with a £2.9m deficit, provoking an investigation by Monitor. The chief executive said they had to manage a 15% increase in unplanned activity compared to the previous year, around 300 more unplanned patients each month. The conclusion of the investigation was that the organisation did not have a robust financial recovery plan or a strategy to ensure it continued to provide services for patients in the long term. The trust expected a deficit of £14 million for 2015/6.

In March 2016, 49 emergency patients at the trust waited more than 12 hours to be allocated a bed. This was the second highest figure for any trust in England.

== Facilities ==
The hospital building was built under the Private Finance Initiative and is owned by Semperian PPP Investment Partners which had a contract with Carillion to provide facilities such as catering and housekeeping. From December 2011, Carillion was in an industrial relations dispute with the GMB trade union which represents housekeeping staff, about holiday entitlement, working practices, and other allegations. This dispute resulted in about 50 Employment Tribunal claims lodged against Carillion by their own staff. In September 2014, the trust board considered a report on the implications of this dispute which concluded "The Trust has lost confidence in Carillion's ability to resolve these issues and the Trust continues to pursue all means necessary to ensure they remain focused on addressing them....Concerns about food hygiene and cleanliness have posed a potential risk to patients, visitors and staff which is completely unacceptable....as a PFI hospital, the contract for provision is extremely complicated."

The trust started using an Electronic Prescribing and Medicines Administration system which was developed in-house in June 2015. It improves patient safety by giving automatic warnings about allergic reactions, drug interactions and prescribing guidelines. It also speeds up patient discharge and the flow of patients from the Emergency Department.

2022 saw construction of a new urgent treatment centre, a radiotherapy centre built in partnership with Oxford University Hospitals NHS Foundation Trust, and an energy centre with air source heat pumps. In 2024 there were plans for a rehabilitation centre, a private healthcare facility, a medical equipment sterilisation unit, a mental health facility, and a cancer service building.

== Group of trusts ==
In 2018, the trust agreed to form an alliance with two neighbouring trusts which manage the hospitals at Salisbury and Bath; the three trusts provide most of the hospital services in the Bath, North East Somerset, Swindon and Wiltshire sustainability and transformation plan area. Effective November 2024, Cara Charles-Barks – chief executive of the Bath trust – was appointed as the joint chief executive of the three trusts.

== See also ==
- Healthcare in Wiltshire
- Emergency medical services in the United Kingdom
- List of NHS trusts in England
