= Royal United Hospitals Bath NHS Foundation Trust =

NHS hospital trust

Coordinates: 51.3917°N 2.3910°W

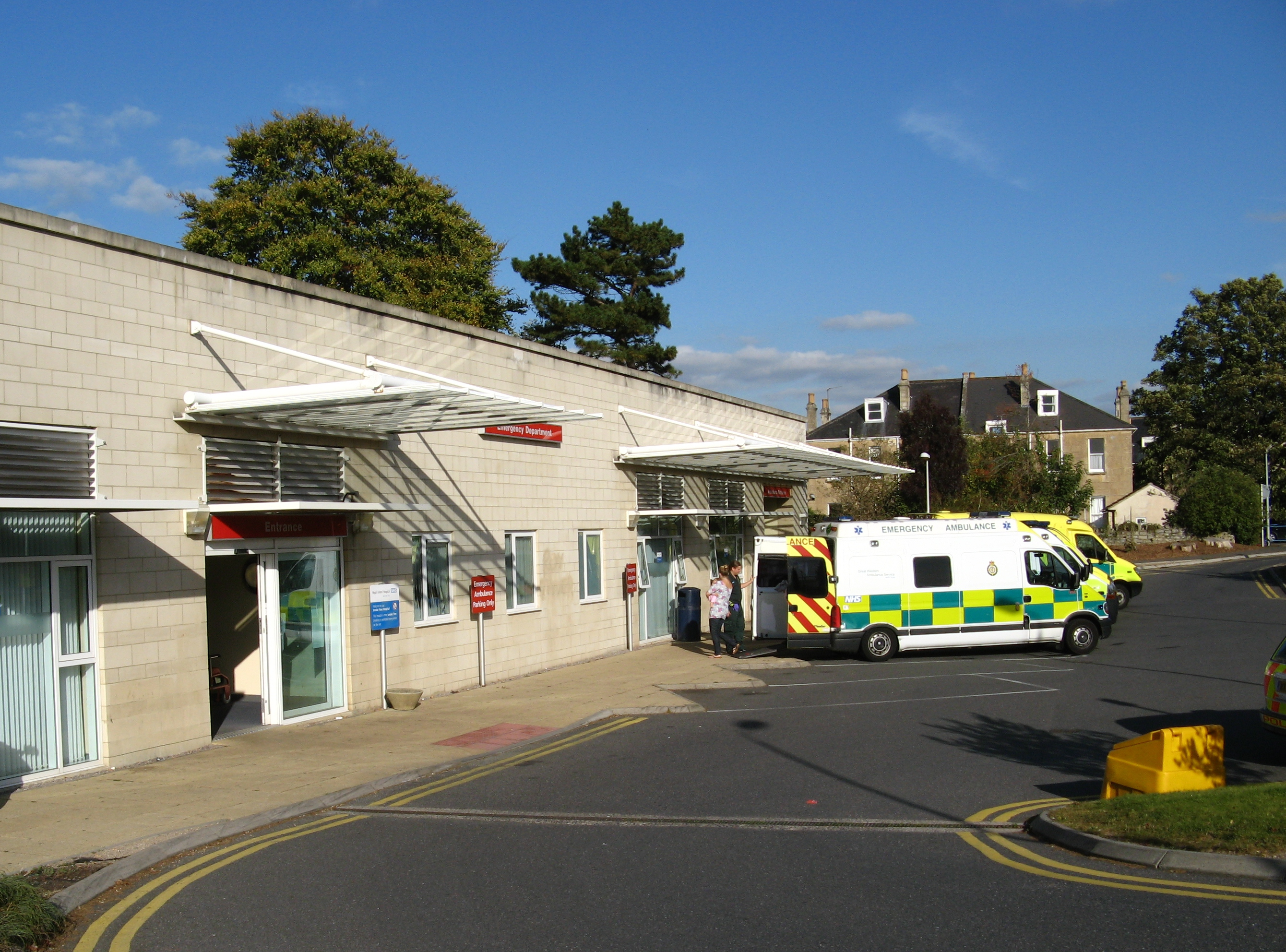
- A&E at the Royal United Hospital, headquarters of the Royal United Hospitals NHS Foundation Trust
- Former name: Royal United Hospital NHS Trust
- Type: NHS foundation trust
- Established: 1 November 2014
- Headquarters: Royal United Hospital, Combe Park, Bath, BA1 3NG
- Hospitals: Royal United Hospital; Royal National Hospital for Rheumatic Diseases; Sulis Hospital
- Chair: Alison Ryan
- Chief executive: Cara Charles-Barks
- Website: www.ruh.nhs.uk

The Royal United Hospitals Bath NHS Foundation Trust is an acute NHS foundation trust which operates the Royal United Hospital (RUH) and Royal National Hospital for Rheumatic Diseases at its Combe Park site in Bath, England as well as the part-private Sulis Hospital at nearby Peasedown St John.

The trust is the provider of emergency and inpatient acute care for most of the Bath and North East Somerset district, through the Royal United Hospital. The two hospitals also treat patients from West Wiltshire, as part of the region's integrated care system.

== History ==
The Royal United Hospital Bath NHS Trust was established on 1 November 1991 taking over the management of Royal United Hospital from Bath Area Health Authority. In 2011, the Trust applied to become authorised as an NHS foundation trust from late Spring 2012, but this was postponed after issues were raised by the Care Quality Commission about aspects of patient care. The process was restarted in 2014. It was authorised as a Foundation Trust in October 2014 commencing on 1 November 2014.

The Royal United Hospital takes its name from the union of the Bath Casualty Hospital founded in 1788, and the Bath City Dispensary and Infirmary founded in 1792. The Casualty Hospital was founded in response to the serious injuries sustained to labourers working on the buildings which were being constructed in the city. The Dispensary and Infirmary developed from the Bath Pauper Scheme, a charity founded in 1747 to provide medical treatment for destitute persons in Bath.

Since July 2022, health and care services in the area are planned and delivered by an integrated care board, where the trust works alongside the two Wiltshire NHS trusts – Great Western (Swindon) and Salisbury.

The trust's chief executive is Cara Charles-Barks, who took over in September 2020 on the retirement of James Scott. In November 2024, Charles-Barks was appointed as the first joint chief executive of the three trusts.

=== RUH redevelopment ===
In 2008, plans were revealed for a £100 million redevelopment of the pre-World War II RUH North buildings, which would include an increase in single-occupancy rooms in line with Government targets. The first stage of this work was originally planned to start in 2012. In 2014, a five-year development plan, incorporating a new cancer centre, was confirmed.

=== Royal National Hospital for Rheumatic Diseases ===
In 2015 the trust took over the specialist Royal National Hospital for Rheumatic Diseases NHS Foundation Trust which was experiencing financial difficulties. In 2019 the hospital moved from its historic building in central Bath to a new building adjacent to the main RUH building at Combe Park.

=== Sulis Hospital ===
In 2021 the trust bought the private hospital, Circle Bath, from Circle Health. It was intended that 30% of its capacity would still be used for private work. The hospital, built in 2010, was renamed Sulis Hospital and is at Peasedown St John, about 6 miles (10 km) south of the Combe Park site. It is used for high-volume and low-complexity work, and more than 1,100 two-year NHS waiters were treated there in 2021–22. Private activity increased from 33% in 2019–20 to 40% in 2021–22.

== Performance ==
By 2010, the rates of hospital-acquired MRSA and Clostridioides difficile infection were below the national average. In 2010, Dr Foster Hospital Guide reported that RUH mortality rates give no cause for concern.

In 2010, Which? judged that the RUH had the best hospital car parking regime in England.

It was named by the Health Service Journal as one of the top hundred NHS trusts to work for in 2015. At that time it had 3,852 full-time equivalent staff and a sickness absence rate of 3.85%. It was recommend it as a place for treatment by 75% of staff and as a place to work by 68%.

The Consultant Connect service, established at the trust in July 2015, allows GPs to speak directly with a consultant to get specialist advice in real-time. It is now widely used across the NHS and has meant that at least 18,500 patients have been spared an outpatient hospital visit.

== Maternity services ==
Maternity services at the RUH were operated under contract, and had not been run by the Royal United Hospital Bath NHS Trust since its foundation in 1992 until 1 June 2014, after the contract had been retendered for three years by the NHS Wiltshire Clinical Commissioning Group. The Great Western Hospitals NHS Foundation Trust had run the service immediately prior to 2014.

== Criticism ==
The trust ran a deficit most years from 1992 to 2009, with very large deficits from 2002 to 2006, creating an historic debt of £38M by 2008. It received a critical Commission for Health Improvement report and zero-star rating in 2002 after a determination of "deliberate manipulation" of waiting lists. Following this, the trust terminated the chief executive's contract, but in a subsequent employment tribunal case the former chief executive was awarded £218,439 for unfair dismissal with the tribunal rejecting allegations of neglect over misreporting waiting list numbers. In 2010 there was a plan to repay historic debt by 2013.

In February 2008, Conservative peer Lord Mancroft made a scathing attack on nursing staff at the hospital, saying many nurses who looked after him were "promiscuous, lazy and grubby".

In 2026 the Trust announced plans to outsource their temporary staffing operations to Pulse, a nursing agency owned by the private-equity-backed Acacium Group. It was reported that this would reduce those workers' employer-pension contributions from 23.7% to around 6%.

== See also ==
- Healthcare in Somerset
- List of NHS trusts
