= Healthcare in Buckinghamshire =

Healthcare in Buckinghamshire was the responsibility for the Aylesbury Vale, Chiltern, and Milton Keynes. They managed the clinical commissioning groups until July 2022.

== History ==
From 1947 to 1965 NHS services in Buckinghamshire were managed by the North-West Metropolitan and Oxford regional hospital boards. In 1974 the boards were abolished and replaced by regional health authorities. Buckinghamshire came under the Oxford RHA. Regions were reorganized in 1996 and Buckinghamshire came under the Anglia and Oxford Regional Health Authority. Buckinghamshire was divided between area health authorities, Slough being managed by Berkshire from 1974 until 1982 when it was divided into three district health authorities: Aylesbury, Milton Keynes and Wycombe. in 1993 the whole county was one health authority. Regional health authorities were reorganized and renamed strategic health authorities in 2002. Buckinghamshire was under Thames Valley SHA. In 2006 regions were again re organized and Buckinghamshire came under NHS South Central until that was abolished in 2013. There is one primary care trust for the area.

== Sustainability and transformation plan ==
Under the sustainability and transformation plan for the county, Louise Watson, director of NHS England’s new care models vanguard programme, was appointed managing director at the Buckinghamshire integrated care system in February 2018. She reported to the partnership board of chief executives from all the organizations involved: Aylesbury Vale and Chiltern clinical commissioning groups; Buckinghamshire Healthcare NHS Trust; Buckinghamshire County Council; Oxford Health NHS Foundation Trust; South Central Ambulance Service; and the GP Federation Fed Bucks

Louise Patten was appointed the permanent chief executive of both Oxford shire and Buckinghamshire CCGs in January 2019, leading to suggestions that this might be followed by a merger.

== Commissioning ==
The two clinical commissioning groups worked under a federation arrangement from July 2016 and proposed a merger in April 2018. The county was one of eight proposed Accountable care systems in England.

The Buckinghamshire CCG, created through the merger of Aylesbury Vale and Chiltern CCGs forecast an overspend of £19.2 million for 2017/8.

== Acute care ==
The main providers of NHS acute hospital care in the county are Buckinghamshire Healthcare NHS Trust and Milton Keynes University Hospital NHS Foundation Trust. There are two hospitals with accident and emergency facilities: Milton Keynes University Hospital and Stoke Mandeville Hospital in Aylesbury. Another at Wexham Park Hospital is located just over the southern county border. Royal Buckinghamshire Hospital is a substantial private provider of treatment for spinal injuries. Ambulance services are provided by South Central Ambulance Service.

== Mental health ==
NHS Mental Health services are provided by Oxford Health NHS Foundation Trust.

== See also ==
- Category: Health in Buckinghamshire
- Healthcare in the United Kingdom
