= Royal National Hospital for Rheumatic Diseases =

- Royal United Hospitals Bath NHS Foundation Trust
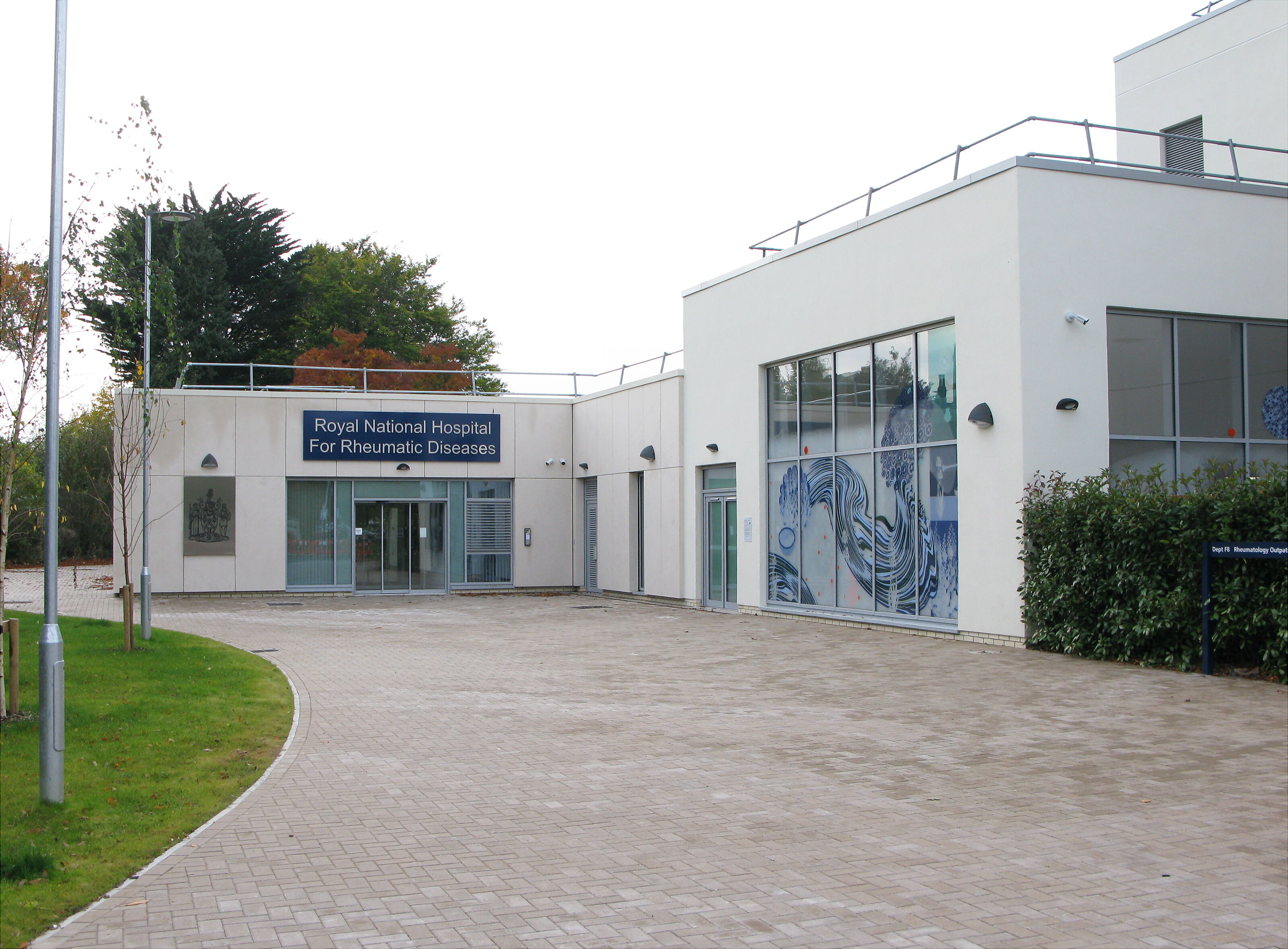
- Entrance to the 2019 building at Combe Park

- Shown in Somerset

Geography
- Location: Combe Park, Bath, Somerset, England
- Coordinates: 51.3916°N 2.3898°W

Organisation
- Care system: NHS
- Type: Specialist

Services
- Emergency department: No
- Speciality: Rheumatology

History
- Founded: 1738

Links
- Website: www.ruh.nhs.uk/RNHRD/
- Lists: Hospitals in England

The Royal National Hospital for Rheumatic Diseases is a small, specialist NHS hospital on the Royal United Hospital site in Weston, Bath, England.

The hospital was founded in 1738 as a general hospital for the poor in the city centre, where the frontage of its building still reads Royal Mineral Water Hospital; it is known locally as "The Mineral Hospital" or "The Min". In 2015, the trust running the hospital experienced financial difficulties and was taken over by Royal United Hospitals Bath NHS Foundation Trust, with clinical services moving to a new building at the trust's Combe Park site in 2019.

== History ==
From the 16th century, the needs of the "deserving poor" who came to take the healing waters of the geothermal springs at the Roman Baths were recognised and they were allowed free use of the waters. This attracted beggars; large numbers of people visited the city but St John's Hospital was only accessible to local residents. Proposals in 1716 for a hospital to receive them were supported by Lady Elizabeth Hastings, Henry Hoare, Joseph Jekyll, William Oliver, Beau Nash and others.

Dr Tobias Venner (1577–1660), who was appointed physician in 1652 at Bellotts Hospital, the forerunner of the Royal National Hospital for Rheumatic Diseases, is considered to be the Bath hospital's first consultant.

The hospital was established in 1738 as The Mineral Water Hospital. It provided care for the impoverished sick who were attracted to Bath because of the supposed healing properties of the mineral water from the spa. The original building, designed by John Wood the Elder, was built with Bath stone donated by Ralph Allen and completed in 1742. It was enlarged in 1793 by the addition of an attic storey, and in 1860 by a second building erected on the west side of the earlier edifice. A fine pediment, in Bath stone, on the 1860 building depicts the parable of the Good Samaritan. The building was classified as Grade II* listed in 1972.

In 2003, the hospital became an NHS foundation trust, specialising in rheumatic disease and rehabilitation. The hospital had a large brain injury rehabilitation service with separate units for adults, adolescents and children; this service closed in March 2013 as a result of financial pressures.

The hospital was named by the Health Service Journal as the best acute specialist trust to work for in 2015. At that time it had 208 full-time equivalent staff and a sickness absence rate of 3.18%. 91% of staff recommended it as a place for treatment and 79% recommended it as a place to work.

=== Royal United Hospitals ===
It was announced in January 2015 that the Royal National Hospital for Rheumatic Diseases NHS Foundation Trust would be taken over by Royal United Hospitals Bath NHS Foundation Trust, after financial debts had built up toward £2 million. During 2015 and 2016, some services were transferred to the Royal United Hospital (RUH), including endoscopy and children's services.

Construction started on a building at the RUH's Combe Park site in November 2017, to house the Royal National Hospital and the Brownsword Therapies centre. The first departments from the Mineral Hospital and the RUH transferred to the new building in September 2019, and all services were transferred to the RUH site by the end of that year. Camilla, Duchess of Cornwall, who is President of the Royal Osteoporosis Society, formally opened the hospital and therapies centre on 22 October 2019.

Five 18th-century oil paintings from the Mineral Water Hospital were re-hung at the RUH, notably a work of William Hoare titled Dr Oliver and Mr Pierce examining patients with Paralysis, Rheumatism and Leprosy.

== Services ==
The hospital provides local rheumatology services, and also has specialist clinics and services which attract referrals from a national population. Specialist rheumatology clinics include connective tissue disease, ankylosing spondylitis, fibromyalgia, osteoporosis, and Paget's disease. The hospital is a regional centre of excellence for the treatment of lupus.

Nationally commissioned specialist services include:

- Bath Centre for Fatigue Service – for adults experiencing longstanding fatigue linked to a variety of illnesses
- Bath Centre for Pain Services – pain rehabilitation for people with chronic pain, of all ages
- Complex Regional Pain Syndrome Service and the Complex Cancer Late Effects Rehabilitation Service – intensive rehabilitation for adults who are living with complex regional pain syndrome or the late effects of cancer treatment

== Future of Mineral Hospital building ==
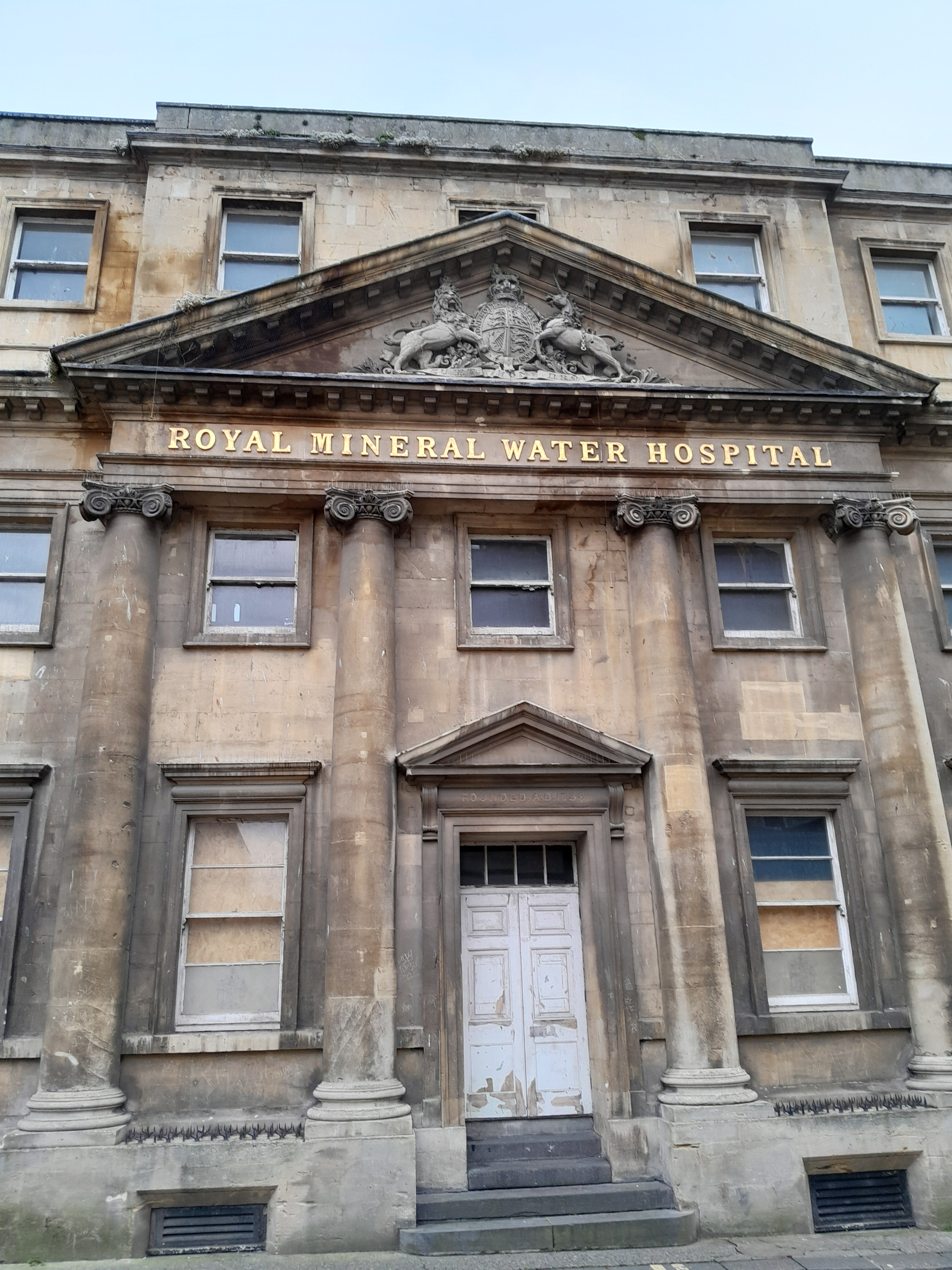
Entrance to the former hospital in the city centre

The historic city centre site at Upper Borough Walls was offered for sale by the RUH Trust in 2017. It was bought by Versant Developments & Homes of Winchester, who sold it to Singapore-based Fragrance Group in January 2018 for £21.5M. Fragrance Group, which owns other historic hotels in England, obtained planning permission in July 2021 to convert the building into a 160-bed hotel by removing 20th-century additions and building an extension, while protecting Roman features.

The planning committee of Bath and North East Somerset Council rejected a 2020 application by Fragrance Group, after the proposed extension was criticised for its size and height, but approved an amended application in 2021. As of August 2025, substantive work has yet to begin on the hotel conversion.

== Archives ==
Some records relating to the hospital are held at Bath Record Office and the Somerset Archives.

== See also ==
- Healthcare in Somerset
- List of hospitals in England
