= Healthcare in Shropshire =

Healthcare in Shropshire was the responsibility of two clinical commissioning groups until July 2022: Shropshire, and Telford and Wrekin.

== History ==
From 1947 to 1974 NHS services in Shropshire were managed by the Birmingham Regional Hospital Board. In 1974 the boards were abolished and replaced by regional health authorities. Shropshire still came under the Birmingham RHA. Regions were reorganised in 1996 and Shropshire came under the West Midlands Regional Health Authority. From 1974 there was an area health authority covering the county and from 1982 one district health authority. Two primary care trusts were established in the county in 2002 one for Telford and the Wrekin and one for Shropshire. They were managed by the West Mercia Strategic Health Authority which was merged into NHS West Midlands in 2006.

== Sustainability and transformation plan ==
Shropshire and Telford and Wrekin formed a sustainability and transformation plan area in March 2016 with Simon Wright, the Chief Executive of Shrewsbury and Telford Hospital NHS Trust as its leader The 2021 deficit was £131.4 million. Closing the A&E at either Telford or Shrewsbury was suggested, to create one hospital specialising in emergency care, allowing the other to specialise in routine surgery. Neither Shropshire County Council nor Telford and Wrekin Council have been prepared to support the plans, because they focus too much on hospitals and neglect GP services.

== Commissioning ==
Shropshire Clinical Commissioning Group was put in special measures in November 2015 after its financial position deteriorated. It expected an in-year deficit of £10.6m for 2015/6. David Evans, the accountable officer of Telford and Wrekin CCG was appointed accountable officer for both groups from April 2016 and developed a joint management team.

== Primary care ==
There are 44 GP practices in Shropshire and 22 in Telford and the Wrekin. Out-of-hours services are provided by Shropdoc. In August 2017 Shropdoc was forced to seek extra funding, saying that the costs of providing out-of-hours contracts were greater than the funding provided.

== Acute services ==
Shrewsbury and Telford Hospital NHS Trust provides acute services for the county. Robert Jones and Agnes Hunt Orthopaedic Hospital is located in the county but serves a much wider area.

== Mental health and community services ==
South Staffordshire and Shropshire Healthcare NHS Foundation Trust is the main NHS provider of mental health services, while Shropshire Community Health NHS Trust provides community services.

== Healthwatch ==
There are two Healthwatch organisations.

== See also ==
- Category:Health in Shropshire
- Healthcare in the United Kingdom
