= Leicestershire Partnership NHS Trust =

Public health body in the English East Midlands

- Type: Mental health trust
- Budget: £282 million in 2012/3
- Chair: Crishni Waring
- Chief executive: Angela Hillery
- Staff: 4,500
- Website: www.leicspart.nhs.uk

Leicestershire Partnership NHS Trust provides mental health, learning disability and community health services across Leicestershire, England.

The Trust is proposing to close Ashby and District Community Hospital, a proposal which is opposed by Ashby Civic Society who do not accept that 'virtual wards' and 'intensive community support' can fully deliver the reductions on hospital admissions that are being claimed for them.

The Trust runs a Family Nurse Partnership service in Leicester with seven nurses and a supervisor. 24 young mothers celebrated their achievements at a special graduation event in December 2014 when they finished the programme.

The Care Quality Commission said in July 2015 that problems at the Trust they had raised in 2013 had still not been addressed. They were concerned about:

- Potential ligature risks and ward layouts that did not allow patients to be observed closely enough
- Incidents of restraint and seclusion that "did not meet guidance"
- Insufficient staffing levels at inpatient wards and in community teams
- Levels of mandatory training that were "not good"
- Patients' dignity not being promoted well enough in some mixed-sex accommodation
