= Care UK =

United Kingdom home care franchise and provider

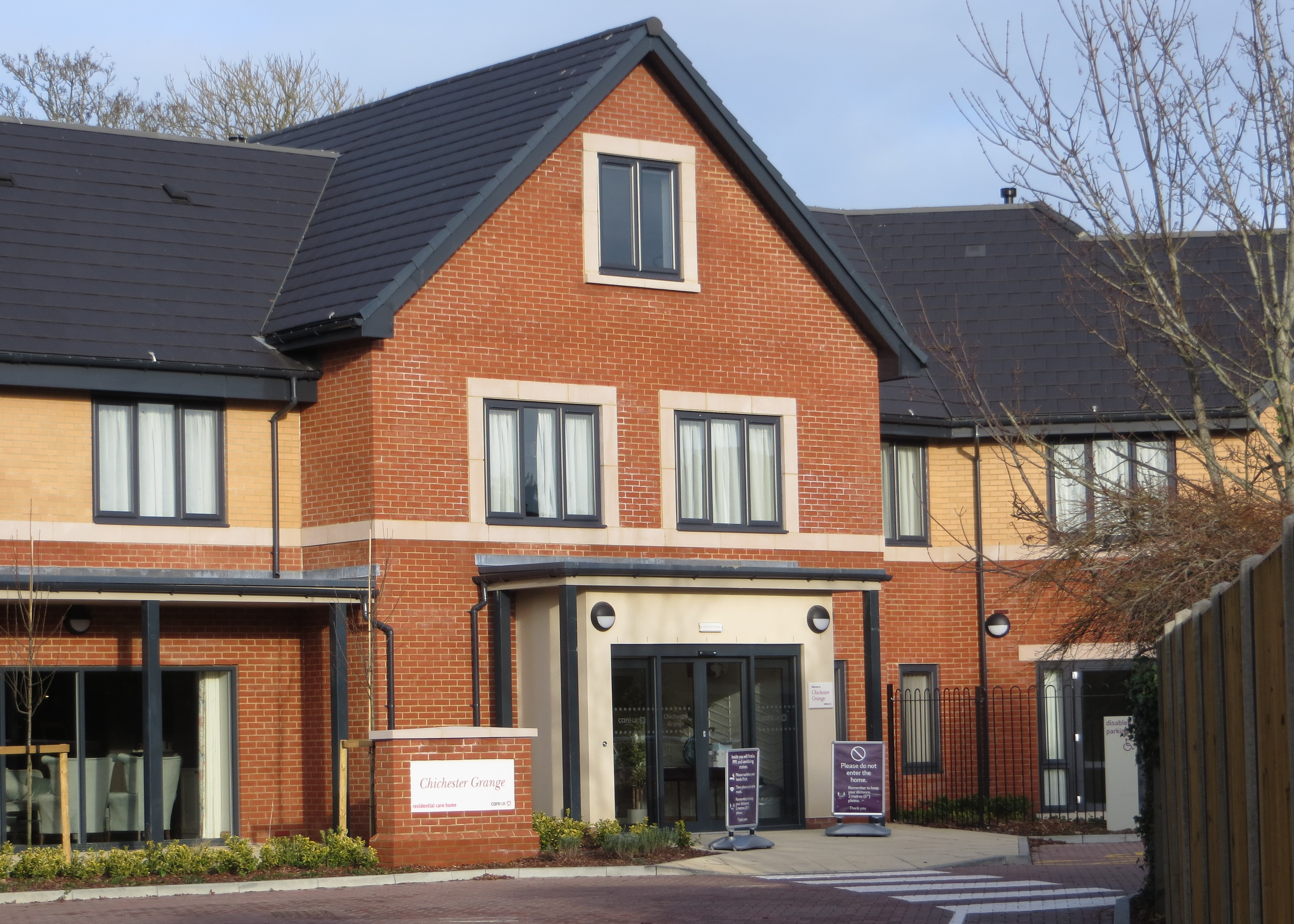
- Chichester Grange Care Home
- Formation: 1982; 44 years ago
- Headquarters: Colchester, Essex, England
- Region served: United Kingdom
- Services: Care provision
- Website: www.careuk.com

Care UK is a provider of residential care for older people. They operate more than 150 homes offering residential care, dementia care, and nursing care. The company formerly also operated a wider range of healthcare services until 2019 when these were split off to Practice Plus Group, private-equity firm Bridgepoint Group retaining ultimate control over both companies.

Their care homes provide a range of services for older people, ranging from short-stay respite care to nursing care and end of life care, plus specialist care and support for people living with Alzheimer’s and other forms of dementia.

Care UK's headquarters are at Colchester, Essex.

== History ==
The company was formed as Anglia Secure Homes in 1982, becoming Care UK plc in 1994. In 1997, the company acquired Care Solutions Limited, a provider of residential services for people with learning disabilities responsible for 59 homes in Newcastle, Bradford, Staffordshire and Guildford. In 1998, it took on a further seven care homes in Hampshire and the South Coast with the acquisition of The Care Partnership.

Care UK delisted from the stock exchange in 2010 following a management buyout, via a £281m acquisition by private equity firm Bridgepoint; since 2010 its major shareholder has been Bridgepoint Capital.

Care UK was selected by Suffolk County Council in October 2012 to fulfill its long-term vision for older people's care in the Suffolk region. The £60 million project saw the building of 10 brand new care homes and daycare centres to meet the demand for care in Suffolk.

It bought Harmoni in 2012 from ECI Partners for about £50 million.

In January 2014 it was announced that Philippa Slinger, the former chief executive of the troubled Heatherwood and Wexham Park Hospitals NHS Foundation Trust was to join Care UK.

After the Health and Social Care Act 2012 came into force in April 2013, by November 2014 Care UK had won three contracts worth £104m.

In 2015 Care UK sells three of its divisions. The home care service is sold to Mears Group in June and earlier in the year the learning disability services are transferred to Lifeways and the mental health services are transferred to Partnerships in Care. This allowed the organisation to focus on the care side of the business.

Following the death of a vulnerable inmate at HM Prison Chelmsford in January 2017 and criticism by the Prison ombudsman, Care UK announced it would end its healthcare contract there as the level of resource the prison service made available was insufficient.

Care UK launched the Wishing Tree initiative in 2017. Every Care UK home has a wishing tree where residents can hang a wish - big or small. The care team and their family will then go above and beyond to grant it. So far many wishes have been granted, from visiting penguins to plane rides, football stadium visits and even a trip to the Vatican.

In March 2019 the residential care and healthcare sides of Care UK split. The healthcare arm of the business became Practice Plus Group, while Care UK remained focused on providing residential care services for older people across the UK.

In September 2021 Care UK won ‘Best Large Care Home group’ at the Care Home Awards.

In July 2021 Care UK announced it would be taking over the leadership and management of 26 homes from Sunrise Senior Living UK and Gracewell Healthcare.

== Services ==
In 2018 Care UK operated 114 care homes with almost 8,000 beds. 44% of the residents were self-funding. It supports over 17,000 older people and those with disabilities through home care services. As of 2019, its NHS treatment centres, out of hours primary care and 111 service handle more than 18 million patient interactions a year.

== Controversies ==
=== Political donations ===
In November 2009 John Nash, the chairman of Care UK, made a donation of £21,000 to the private office of Andrew Lansley, who would later become Secretary of State for Health, but was at the time the health spokesman for the opposition. Lansley was later accused of a conflict of interest, as Care UK would be a major beneficiary of proposed changes.

In 2014, Care UK's former chairman Lord Nash became a government minister and Care UK took over services for people with severe learning disabilities in Doncaster, south Yorkshire, where they immediately cut wages of staff who had been on NHS terms by up to 35% while bringing in 100 new workers on £7 an hour. Fifty carers for the disabled began strike action in protest and by August 2014, had been on strike for seven weeks, making it one of the longest strikes in the history of the NHS. Care UK won the supported living contract from the council after telling officials that it could deliver it for £6.7m over three years, yet the wage bill alone for the service was £7m.

=== Alleged tax avoidance ===
A report in The Guardian of 17 March 2012 stated that Care UK "has a reduced tax bill by taking out loans through the Channel Islands stock exchange and coming to an agreement with HMRC". Another report by the same newspaper in August 2014 stated that "Care UK has not paid a penny in corporation tax" since it was bought by the private equity firm Bridgepoint Capital in 2010.

=== Ealing Hospital ===
In July 2015, ITV's Exposure programme uncovered poor practice in the urgent care centre run by the firm at Ealing Hospital. Failings included:

- Pregnant women with ectopic pregnancies waiting 3 hours before being seen by a GP;
- Empty medicine cabinets and doctors admitting they frequently ran out of painkillers and antibiotics;
- Work experience students checking up on patients because doctors and nurses were too busy;
- GPs admitting they can't understand X-rays 'for s***’ and may miss fractures;
- Clinics dealing with 50 per cent more patients than they could manage;
- Patients told to take their own temperature.

It is also alleged that staff registered the discharge of patients before they had been treated to avoid breaching the four-hour wait target.

Ealing Clinical Commissioning Group and Healthwatch Ealing both investigated the situation. Ealing Council considered the service at a meeting of its scrutiny committee in September 2015. The CCG agreed to pay for an additional GP and said that the service was still considered safe.

== See also ==
- Private medicine in the UK
