= Salisbury NHS Foundation Trust =

NHS hospital trust

- Former name: Salisbury Health Care NHS Trust
- Type: NHS foundation trust
- Established: 1 June 2006
- Headquarters: Odstock Road, Salisbury SP2 8BJ
- Hospitals: Salisbury District Hospital
- Chair: Ian Green
- Chief executive: Cara Charles-Barks
- Website: www.salisbury.nhs.uk

Salisbury NHS Foundation Trust is an NHS foundation trust based in Salisbury, England, that covers South Wiltshire, North and East Dorset and South West Hampshire. It gained foundation trust status in 2006. Its main site is Salisbury District Hospital, a large general hospital.

Cara Charles-Barks became chief executive of the trust on 1 November 2024 alongside Great Western Hospitals NHS Foundation Trust and Royal United Hospitals Bath NHS Foundation Trust.

== History ==
The Salisbury Health Care NHS Trust was established on 1 November 1993, taking over the management of Salisbury District Hospital from Salisbury Health Authority. On 1 June 2006, the Trust achieved NHS foundation trust status, becoming Salisbury NHS Foundation Trust.

== Structure ==
In 2013 the trust established a subsidiary company, Salisbury Trading Limited, providing laundry services, to which 77 estates and facilities staff were transferred. The intention was to achieve VAT benefits, as well as cost savings, by recruiting new staff on less expensive non-NHS contracts. VAT benefits arise because NHS trusts can only claim VAT back on a small subset of goods and services they buy, but the Value Added Tax Act 1994 provides a mechanism through which NHS trusts can qualify for refunds on contracted-out services.

In 2018, the trust agreed to form an alliance with two neighbouring trusts which manage the hospitals at Swindon and Bath; the three trusts provide most of the hospital services in the Bath, North East Somerset, Swindon and Wiltshire sustainability and transformation plan area. Effective November 2024, Cara Charles-Barks – chief executive of the Bath trust – was appointed as the joint chief executive of the three trusts.

== Performance ==
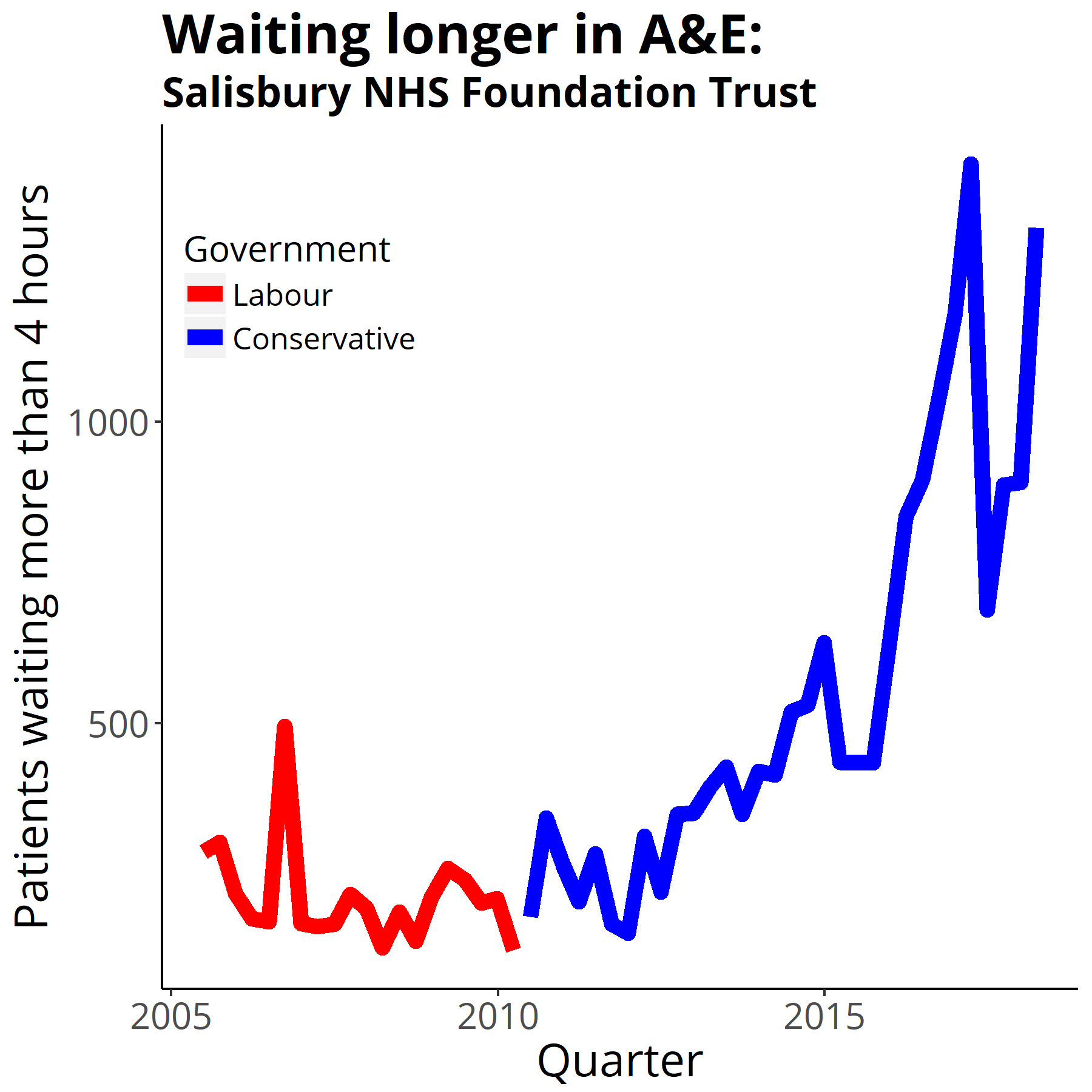
Waits over 4 hours in A&E, 2005–2018

In September 2014, the trust was placed in the top 100 healthcare employers in the country by the Best Companies Group on the basis of a staff survey on quality of leadership, staff communications, training and development and the working environment. It was named by the Health Service Journal as one of the top hundred NHS trusts to work for in 2015. At that time it had 2,752 full time equivalent staff and a sickness absence rate of 3.37%. 83% of staff recommend it as a place for treatment and 75% recommended it as a place to work.

The trust decided to implement a Lorenzo patient record system in August 2015, expecting savings of £12m over 10 years.

In March 2016, the Trust was ranked fifth in the Learning from Mistakes League.

== See also ==
- List of NHS trusts in England
