= Kettering General Hospital NHS Foundation Trust =

Kettering General Hospital NHS Foundation Trust is an NHS trust responsible for the management of Kettering General Hospital and a new outpatient centre in Irthlingborough, East Northamptonshire.

== History ==
Kettering General came under the management of a separate NHS Trust in 1994. It achieved Foundation Trust status in November 2008, which is a fundamental part of the current NHS reform program. The Trust has outpatient clinics in Corby, Wellingborough and Rushden. The trust (including Kettering General) has 600 beds, 17 theaters and employs more than 3,200 staff. David Sissling, former Chief Executive of the NHS in Wales was appointed as the new chief executive of the Trust in January 2014 replacing Lorene Read. In 2014/5 the trust was given a loan of £7.4 million by the Department of Health which is supposed to be paid back in five years. The trust opened a new outpatient centre in Irthlingborough, East Northamptonshire, intended to replace Rushden Memorial Clinic, in February 2011.

It started a major medical records digitisation project in 2021. More than 220,000 medical records will be scanned into the IMMJ Systems MediViewer Electronic Document Management System by Swiss Post Solutions.

== Performance ==
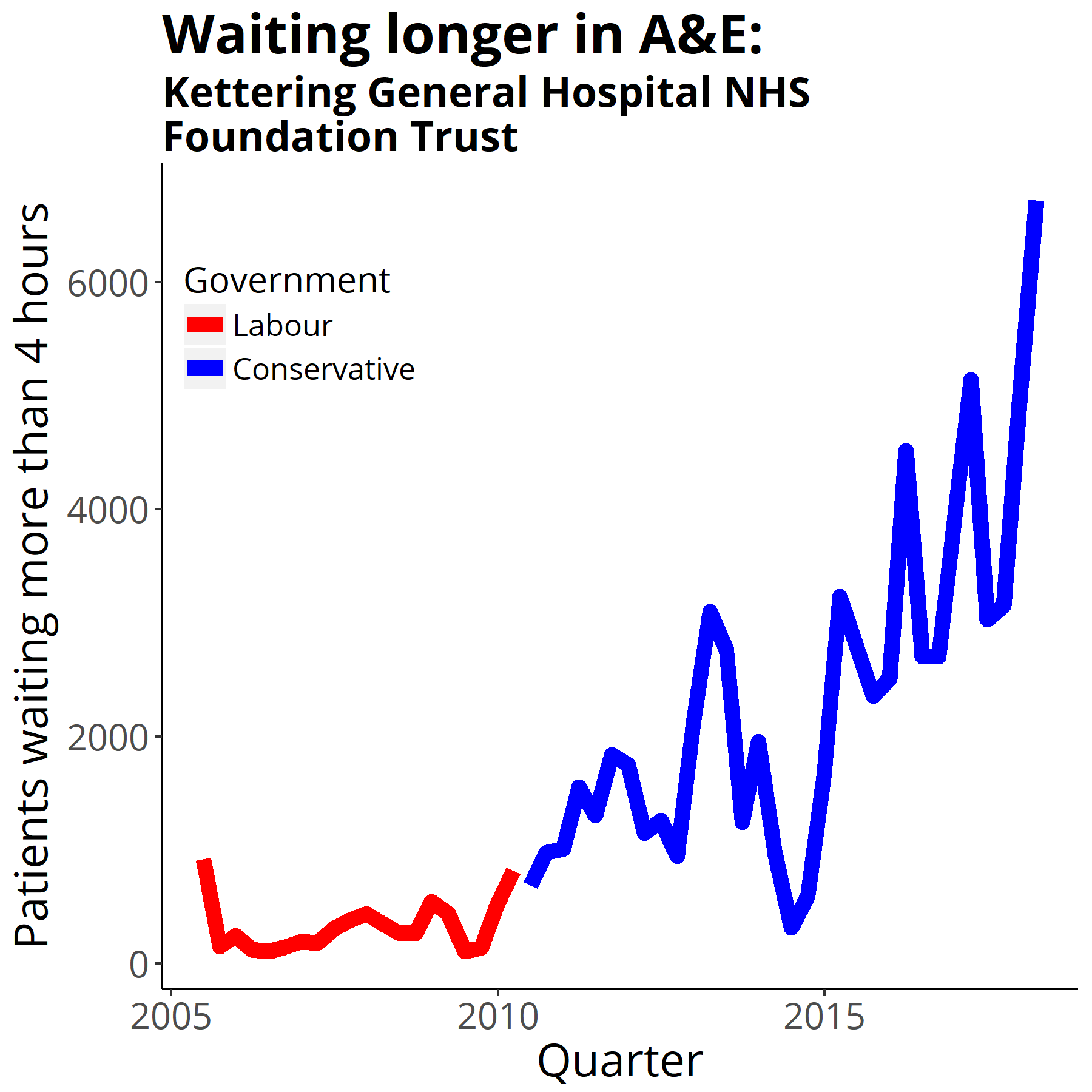
Four-hour target in the emergency department quarterly figures from NHS England Data from https://www.england.nhs.uk/statistics/statistical-work-areas/ae-waiting-times-and-activity/

In 2017 Kettering General created controversy when it was reported that the hospital management had fiddled waiting time data. The Trust commissioned an independent review of its handling errors, which found no evidence of fraud.
