= Take Care Now =

English medical provider

Take Care Now was an independent provider of Out-of-hours services in England. The company had contracts in Cambridgeshire, Suffolk, Great Yarmouth and Waveney, and Worcester.

== Civil action against the company ==
In May 2009, civil legal action was begun against Take Care Now after a locum doctor, Daniel Ubani recruited by TCN, through a locum agency, was convicted of manslaughter for giving a patient an overdose of morphine. He had flown into the UK the day before his 12-hour Cambridgeshire shift for Take Care Now and had only had a few hours' sleep. A spokeswoman for the Care Quality Commission said: "We are aware of a number of concerns in relation to out-of-hours care provided by Take Care Now to the NHS."

== Demise ==
Take Care Now has been taken over by Harmoni and is now trading as Suffolk Integrated Healthcare.
