= Prospect Hospice =

Coordinates: 51.5265°N 1.7852°W

The Prospect Hospice is a charity based in Swindon established in 1980 providing palliative care.

It initially established a base at the Victoria Hospital in Swindon's Old Town and moved into purpose-built premises in 1995.

Swindon Clinical Commissioning Group agreed in June 2015 to fund a community therapy team at the Prospect Hospice, providing occupational and physiotherapy at home, in order to reduce pressure on hospital beds.

It has a fundraising cafe in Wroughton run by volunteers.
