= Harmoni =

Defunct English healthcare company

Harmoni was a provider of outsourced healthcare services including out-of-hours services, NHS 111, prisoner healthcare and IT services. It provided NHS services to more than eight million people in the UK.

It was created by a merger of ECI healthcare investment's WCI Group’s IT services division and the Harmoni GP cooperative. It was the most successful out-of-hours provider in winning the Government’s NHS 111 contracts in 2012.

It was sold in 2012 by ECI Partners to Care UK for about £50 million.

The company claimed that it made no profit out of the out-of-hours market. The Chair of Camden's Health Scrutiny Panel said the company won the out-of-hours contract for Camden not on quality, but on price. They described the service as a loss-leader. It lost the contract for Hackney to the GP co-operative, City and Hackney Urgent Healthcare Social Enterprise in October 2013.

== See also ==
- Private healthcare in the United Kingdom
