= Medvivo =

Health services company in the United Kingdom

- Formerly: Wiltshire Medical Services
- Founded: 2004
- Headquarters: Chippenham, Wiltshire, England
- Services: Telehealth services

Medvivo is a provider of telehealth and related services based in Chippenham, Wiltshire, England and owned by the Eight Roads venture capital fund.

The company was founded in 2004 as Wiltshire Medical Services, in response to a change to the contract to run GP out-of-hours services for North Wiltshire Primary Care Group. Its name changed to Medvivo in 2013 after it was acquired by Moonray Investors, an arm of Fidelity Ventures, which became Eight Roads in 2015.

The company acquired Medvivo Careline Limited, an alarm monitoring service formerly known as Magna Careline, in 2014 from the Magna Housing Group. In the same year the company was said to be one the major UK players in the telehealth market. It is part of the Argenti telehealthcare partnership which has a contract with Hampshire County Council for technology-based care. It is a member of the Innovation Council of the New Engineering Foundation.

Since 2018, Medvivo has been responsible for urgent care services for the Bath and North East Somerset, Swindon and Wiltshire Integrated Care Board, including NHS 111 and GP out-of-hours services; it also provides telecare monitoring for Wiltshire Council. To implement these services, the company works with other providers such as (from 2023) Practice Plus Group.

Medvivo also runs an advice telephone line for health and social workers in Wiltshire and Bexley’s emergency link line. Its service in Surrey is claimed to be the largest telehealth deployment in the country.

Medvivo was involved, with other agencies, in the response to concerns over a human trafficking operation at a travellers' site near Semington, Wiltshire, in April 2015.

From 2016, the company partnered with Care South to provide respite and reablement support for people in their own homes in Dorset, for which Medvivo provides a technology package and daily reassurance phone calls.

In November 2020, Medvivo was acquired by HealthHero, a European digital health provider.
