= Accountable care system =

An accountable care system is a system of healthcare provision which is intended to be integrated, and in particular to merge the funding of primary care with that for hospital care, therefore providing incentives to keep people healthy and out of hospital. It has features in common with accountable care organizations in the United States.

== England ==
Accountable care systems were organisations in the English NHS which in some respects are intended to replicate the features of the American accountable care organization. They were defined by NHS England as an area ‘in which commissioners and providers, in partnership with local authorities, take explicit collective responsibility for resources and population health’. After a great deal of hostility to the use of the term it was announced in February 2018 that these organisations were in future to be called integrated care systems, and that all the 44 sustainability and transformation plans will be expected to progress in this direction.

== New Zealand ==
Canterbury, New Zealand has developed an accountable care system which has been held up as an example in the UK. Canterbury District Health Board has what is regarded as a successful system, which has moderated the rate of growth in hospital use by investing in services in the community.

According to the King's Fund there were three key ingredients in the success of this system, which took several years to develop, were:

- A clear, unifying vision behind the ‘one system, one budget’ message
- Sustained investment supporting staff with skills to innovate
- Development of new models of integrated working and new forms of contracting

The system has moderated demand for hospital care, particularly among older people, with lower acute medical admission rates compared with other parts of New Zealand and lower acute readmission rates, a shorter average length of stay with lower emergency department attendances, higher spending on community-based services and lower spending on emergency hospital care. However the number of hospital beds has not been reduced and the system struggles to meet demand.

== Spain ==
Alzira, Valencia has a capitation based system with integration between primary and secondary care providers and a unified IT system across all services. This has become known as the Alzira model and received a great deal of attention. Under this model the provider receives a fixed annual sum per local inhabitant (capitation) from the regional government for the duration of the contract, and in return, must offer free, universal access to a range of primary, acute and specialist health services to the local population. It required a unified information system across all the services, with a shared patient record between GPs and specialists. In Alzira patients were free to go elsewhere for care, and if they did so the local provider had to meet the cost.

The quality of services appears to be considerably higher than other health care systems, with more day surgery, lower emergency admission rates, lower re-admission rates and higher patient satisfaction.
