= Integrated care system =

Type of healthcare system in England

Integrated Care Boards since April 2026

In England, an integrated care system (ICS) is a statutory partnership of organisations who plan, buy, and provide health and care services in their geographical area.

The organisations involved include the NHS, local authorities, voluntary and charity groups, and independent care providers. The NHS Long Term Plan of January 2019 called for the whole of England to be covered by ICSs by April 2021. On 1 July 2022, ICSs – by then 42 in number – replaced clinical commissioning groups in England.

== Statutory bodies ==
The Health and Care Act 2022 put these systems on a statutory basis, each with an approved constitution. On 1 July 2022, a total of 42 ICSs became statutory. There are more than 70 performance metrics by which they are judged, grouped into six "oversight themes": quality, access and outcomes, preventing ill health and reducing inequalities, leadership, people, and finances. The poorest performers will be put in a "recovery support programme", which will replace the label of special measures. Each system is to set their own constitution, determine staff pay and can raise "additional income" but the chair must be approved by the Secretary of State for Health and Social Care.

The areas covered by each ICS vary considerably by population and demographics. Population size ranges from 500,000 to more than 3 million people. Some have more than 10 upper-tier local authorities and some only one. Nearly 50% of the neighbourhoods in Birmingham and Solihull are in the most deprived fifth of the neighbourhoods nationally, compared to 1% in Surrey Heartlands.

=== Governance ===
NHS England produced a model constitution in July 2021, which systems are expected to use when developing their own arrangements. Each ICS must have an integrated care board with at least five executive directors and three non-executives.

=== Integrated care partnership ===
The boards must work with local authorities to create an integrated care partnership (ICP) committee for each system, to include local organisations such as the voluntary sector and social enterprises. The ICP works on prevention, wider social and economic factors affecting health, and reducing health inequalities.

=== Pharmacy ===
Each ICS is to have a community pharmacy clinical lead, funded by the Pharmacy Integration Programme for the first two years.

== History ==
=== The first accountable care systems (2017) ===
Eight sustainability and transformation plan areas in England were named in June 2017 by Simon Stevens, chief executive of NHS England, as a first wave in the development of what were then called accountable care systems. He said they "will bring together providers and commissioners to help break down barriers between primary, secondary and social care". They would be given up to £450 million between them in transformation funding over the next 4 years. The eight were:

- Frimley Health and Care System – a consortium of 30 public and private care providers with five clinical commissioning groups, five GP federations, 10 local, district and county authorities, two ambulance trusts and five mental health and community providers including Virgin Care (now HCRG Care Group);
- South Yorkshire and Bassetlaw – seven NHS hospital trusts covering 15 hospital sites, which employ 45,000 staff and service 2.3 million residents;
- Nottinghamshire – with an initial focus on Greater Nottingham and the southern part of the sustainability and transformation partnership; includes seven public bodies and Circle Health;
- Blackpool and Fylde Coast, with the potential to spread to other parts of the Lancashire and South Cumbria STP at a later stage;
- Dorset;
- Luton, with Milton Keynes and Bedfordshire;
- West Berkshire;
- Buckinghamshire.

Greater Manchester was not included because it already had more advanced arrangements under its 2015 "devolution" deal. Surrey Heartlands began a similar arrangement in 2018.

In each area a provider or, more usually, an alliance of providers was to collaborate to meet the needs of a defined population with a budget determined by capitation. There was to be a contract specifying the outcomes and other objectives they were required to achieve within the given budget over a period of time. This might extend well beyond health and social care services to encompass public health and other services. In Manchester, the objectives were specified over ten years. Keeping people out of hospital by moving services into the community was a common feature. NHS trusts, clinical commissioning groups and local authorities in the new ACSs were to "take on clear collective responsibility for resources and population health".

The process was denounced by John Sinnott, Chief Executive of Leicestershire County Council in September 2017 as lacking any element of public accountability. He said that existing models in other countries were interesting but not relevant to democratic accountabilities in the UK since they had different governance structures and forms of service provision.

It was proposed that systems employing general practitioners would have to meet the costs of their indemnity insurance.

In September 2017 NHS England produced a handbook designed to support the creation of new payment models which were intended to remove the direct relationship between NHS activity and payment, improve the alignment of payment for all providers within the care model and better incentivise prevention and wellbeing.

=== Integrated care systems (2018–2025) ===
In February 2018 it was announced that these organisations were in future to be called integrated care systems, and that all 44 sustainability and transformation plans would be expected to progress in this direction. In May 2018 the ten pioneer systems were described by the Health Select Committee as nascent and fragile. Also in 2018 they were described by Chris Ham as "coalitions of the willing". He said that real progress had only happened in places where there was a history of collaborative working. He also commented that there was little guidance and so more latitude than is usually the case with national NHS initiatives.

In January 2019 it was announced in the NHS Long Term Plan that by April 2021 integrated care systems were to cover the whole of England, with a single clinical commissioning group for each area. Each one was to be run by a partnership board with members from commissioners, trusts, and primary care. But it has been suggested that "All ICSs are structured differently as there is no fixed model for how they should be developed; and the leadership is defined in terms of roles and agents, with little to guide leadership practices and behaviours in a complex, collaborative governance arrangement."

Three more areas were designated in June 2019, and four more in May 2020 (Hertfordshire and West Essex, Humber, Coast and Vale, South West London, and Sussex), bringing the total to 18.

In March 2021, nineteen NHS minority ethnic leaders demanded that the executive officers (not just the non-executives) in the 42 emerging ICSs should be representative of the ethnic diversity in their communities. They wanted to see ethnic diversity and inclusion a part of every NHS board's core business and said every system should develop a 10-year strategy, with annual milestones, for reducing inequalities. By July 2021, chairs had been appointed for 25 of the 42 NHS integrated care boards. 11 were women, and five had a minority ethnic background. The chairs must not be councillors or MPs, or work for any of their ICS's constituent organisations.

=== Mergers and cuts (2025– ) ===
In April 2025, integrated care boards were told to reduce their running costs by 50%, beginning in the third quarter of the year; it was reported that a likely response would be mergers which could reduce the number of systems to around 15. Following this, several ICBs entered into "clustering" arrangements, in which two or more boards shared teams, committees, and senior leadership. The first formal mergers of ICBs were announced in September 2025, to come into effect from 1 April 2026, with the intention of a further round of mergers in April 2027.

== Integrated care providers ==
In August 2018 NHS England launched a consultation on the draft contracts for what were then called integrated care providers (ICPs), following the failure of two legal challenges to an earlier draft contract. The consultation said that this was not a new type of legal entity, but merely the "provider organisation which is awarded a contract by commissioners for the services which are within scope." Dudley clinical commissioning group was at the forefront of this exercise and was to implement the draft voluntary contract, subject to the outcome of this consultation exercise. It was proposed that general practitioners would be able to sign fully or partially integrated contracts, and that fully integrated practices would give up their existing contracts to become salaried.

== Evaluation ==
A report from the Nuffield Trust in December 2021 found that there was very little evidence that integration policies across the UK – including pooling budgets and creating new integrated boards and committees – had dramatically improved patient experience, quality of services or supported the delivery of more care outside of hospitals. They warned that without concurrent investment in social care and broader public services, it was “very likely” further reforms would not yield the desired results.

== Integrated care boards ==
On 1 July 2022 NHS England established 42 integrated care boards, covering the whole of England. From March 2025, several ICBs entered "clustering" arrangements. Seven of these clusters are expected to formally merge into new ICBs from 1 April 2026.

Region	Name	Local authority areas covered	Cluster	Merged ICB (from 1 April 2026)
East of England	NHS Bedfordshire, Luton and Milton Keynes Integrated Care Board	Bedford, Central Bedfordshire, Luton, Milton Keynes, and part of Buckinghamshire	Bedfordshire, Luton and Milton Keynes ICB; Cambridgeshire and Peterborough ICB; Hertfordshire and West Essex ICB	NHS Central East ICB
East of England	NHS Cambridgeshire and Peterborough Integrated Care Board	Cambridge, East Cambridgeshire, Fenland, Huntingdonshire, Peterborough, South Cambridgeshire, and part of North Hertfordshire	Bedfordshire, Luton and Milton Keynes ICB; Cambridgeshire and Peterborough ICB; Hertfordshire and West Essex ICB	NHS Central East ICB
East of England	NHS Hertfordshire and West Essex Integrated Care Board	Broxbourne, Dacorum, East Hertfordshire, Epping Forest, Harlow, Hertsmere, St Albans, Stevenage, Three Rivers, Uttlesford, Watford, Welwyn Hatfield, and part of North Hertfordshire	Bedfordshire, Luton and Milton Keynes ICB; Cambridgeshire and Peterborough ICB; Hertfordshire and West Essex ICB	NHS Central East ICB
East of England	NHS Hertfordshire and West Essex Integrated Care Board	Broxbourne, Dacorum, East Hertfordshire, Epping Forest, Harlow, Hertsmere, St Albans, Stevenage, Three Rivers, Uttlesford, Watford, Welwyn Hatfield, and part of North Hertfordshire	Bedfordshire, Luton and Milton Keynes ICB; Cambridgeshire and Peterborough ICB; Hertfordshire and West Essex ICB	NHS Essex ICB (Former Mid and South Essex ICB, plus the Essex parts of Herts & West Essex and Suffolk & North East Essex ICBs)
East of England	NHS Mid and South Essex Integrated Care Board	Basildon, Braintree, Brentwood, Castle Point, Chelmsford, Maldon, Rochford, Southend-on-Sea, and Thurrock	-	NHS Essex ICB (Former Mid and South Essex ICB, plus the Essex parts of Herts & West Essex and Suffolk & North East Essex ICBs)
East of England	NHS Suffolk and North East Essex Integrated Care Board	Babergh, Colchester, Ipswich, Mid Suffolk, Tendring, West Suffolk, and part of East Suffolk	Norfolk and Waveney ICB; Suffolk and North East Essex ICB	NHS Essex ICB (Former Mid and South Essex ICB, plus the Essex parts of Herts & West Essex and Suffolk & North East Essex ICBs)
East of England	NHS Suffolk and North East Essex Integrated Care Board	Babergh, Colchester, Ipswich, Mid Suffolk, Tendring, West Suffolk, and part of East Suffolk	Norfolk and Waveney ICB; Suffolk and North East Essex ICB	NHS Norfolk and Suffolk ICB
East of England	NHS Norfolk and Waveney Integrated Care Board	Breckland, Broadland, Great Yarmouth, King's Lynn and West Norfolk, North Norfolk, Norwich, South Norfolk, and part of East Suffolk	Norfolk and Waveney ICB; Suffolk and North East Essex ICB	NHS Norfolk and Suffolk ICB
London	NHS North Central London Integrated Care Board	Barnet, Camden, Enfield, Haringey, and Islington	North Central London ICB; North West London ICB	NHS West and North London ICB
London	NHS North West London Integrated Care Board	Brent, Ealing, Hammersmith and Fulham, Harrow, Hillingdon, Hounslow, Kensington and Chelsea, and the City of Westminster	North Central London ICB; North West London ICB	NHS West and North London ICB
London	NHS North East London Integrated Care Board	Barking and Dagenham, City of London, Hackney, Havering, Newham, Redbridge, Tower Hamlets, and Waltham Forest	-	-
London	NHS South East London Integrated Care Board	Bexley, Bromley, Greenwich, Lambeth, Lewisham, and Southwark	-	-
London	NHS South West London Integrated Care Board	Croydon, Kingston upon Thames, Merton, Richmond upon Thames, Sutton, and Wandsworth	-	-
Midlands	NHS Birmingham and Solihull Integrated Care Board	Birmingham and Solihull	Birmingham and Solihull ICB; Black Country ICB	-
Midlands	NHS Black Country Integrated Care Board	Dudley, Sandwell, Walsall, and Wolverhampton	Birmingham and Solihull ICB; Black Country ICB	-
Midlands	NHS Coventry and Warwickshire Integrated Care Board	Coventry, North Warwickshire, Nuneaton and Bedworth, Rugby, Stratford-on-Avon, and Warwick	Coventry and Warwickshire ICB; Herefordshire and Worcestershire ICB	-
Midlands	NHS Herefordshire and Worcestershire Integrated Care Board	Bromsgrove, Herefordshire, Malvern Hills, Redditch, Worcester, Wychavon, and Wyre Forest	Coventry and Warwickshire ICB; Herefordshire and Worcestershire ICB	-
Midlands	NHS Derby and Derbyshire Integrated Care Board	Amber Valley, Bolsover, Chesterfield, Derby, Derbyshire Dales, Erewash, High Peak, North East Derbyshire, and South Derbyshire	Derby and Derbyshire ICB; Lincolnshire ICB; Nottingham and Nottinghamshire ICB	-
Midlands	NHS Lincolnshire Integrated Care Board	Boston, East Lindsey, Lincoln, North Kesteven, South Holland, South Kesteven, and West Lindsey	Derby and Derbyshire ICB; Lincolnshire ICB; Nottingham and Nottinghamshire ICB	-
Midlands	NHS Nottingham and Nottinghamshire Integrated Care Board	Ashfield, Bassetlaw, Broxtowe, Gedling, Mansfield, Newark and Sherwood, Nottingham, and Rushcliffe	Derby and Derbyshire ICB; Lincolnshire ICB; Nottingham and Nottinghamshire ICB	-
Midlands	NHS Leicester, Leicestershire and Rutland Integrated Care Board	Blaby, Charnwood, Harborough, Hinckley and Bosworth, Leicester, Melton, North West Leicestershire, Oadby and Wigston, and Rutland	Leicester, Leicestershire and Rutland ICB; Northamptonshire ICB	-
Midlands	NHS Northamptonshire Integrated Care Board	North Northamptonshire and West Northamptonshire	Leicester, Leicestershire and Rutland ICB; Northamptonshire ICB	-
Midlands	NHS Shropshire, Telford and Wrekin Integrated Care Board	Shropshire and Telford and Wrekin	Shropshire, Telford and Wrekin ICB; Staffordshire and Stoke-on-Trent ICB	-
Midlands	NHS Staffordshire and Stoke-on-Trent Integrated Care Board	Cannock Chase, East Staffordshire, Lichfield, Newcastle-Under-Lyme, South Staffordshire, Stafford, Staffordshire Moorlands, Stoke-on-Trent, and Tamworth, Staffordshire	Shropshire, Telford and Wrekin ICB; Staffordshire and Stoke-on-Trent ICB	-
North East	NHS Humber and North Yorkshire Integrated Care Board	East Riding of Yorkshire, Hambleton, Harrogate, Kingston upon Hull, North East Lincolnshire, North Lincolnshire, Richmondshire, Ryedale, Scarborough, Selby, and York	-	-
North East	NHS North East and North Cumbria Integrated Care Board	Allerdale, Carlisle, Durham, Darlington, Eden, Gateshead, Hartlepool, Middlesbrough, Newcastle-upon-Tyne, North Tyneside, Northumberland, Redcar and Cleveland, South Tyneside, Stockton-on-Tees, Sunderland, and part of Copeland	-	-
North East	NHS South Yorkshire Integrated Care Board	Barnsley, Doncaster, Rotherham, and Sheffield	-	-
North East	NHS West Yorkshire Integrated Care Board	Bradford, Calderdale, Kirklees, Leeds, Wakefield, and part of Craven	-	-
North West	NHS Cheshire and Merseyside Integrated Care Board	Cheshire East, Cheshire West and Chester, Halton, Knowsley, Liverpool, Sefton, St Helens, Warrington, and Wirral	-	-
North West	NHS Greater Manchester Integrated Care Board	Bolton, Bury, Manchester, Oldham, Rochdale, Salford, Stockport, Tameside, Trafford, and Wigan	-	-
North West	NHS Lancashire and South Cumbria Integrated Care Board	Barrow-in-Furness, Blackburn with Darwen, Blackpool, Burnley, Chorley, Fylde, Hyndburn, Lancaster, Pendle, Preston, Ribble Valley, Rossendale, South Lakeland, South Ribble, West Lancashire, Wyre, part of Copeland, and part of Craven	-	-
South East	NHS Buckinghamshire, Oxfordshire and Berkshire West Integrated Care Board	Cherwell, Oxford, Reading, South Oxfordshire, West Berkshire, West Oxfordshire, Wokingham, part of Buckinghamshire, and part of the Vale of White Horse	Buckinghamshire, Oxfordshire and Berkshire West ICB; Frimley ICB	NHS Thames Valley ICB (Former Bucks, Oxon and Berks West ICB, plus Berks East from the former Frimley ICB)
South East	NHS Frimley Integrated Care Board	Bracknell Forest, Rushmoor, Slough, Windsor and Maidenhead, part of Hart, part of Surrey Heath, part of Guildford, part of Runnymede, and part of Waverley	Buckinghamshire, Oxfordshire and Berkshire West ICB; Frimley ICB	NHS Thames Valley ICB (Former Bucks, Oxon and Berks West ICB, plus Berks East from the former Frimley ICB)
South East	NHS Frimley Integrated Care Board	Bracknell Forest, Rushmoor, Slough, Windsor and Maidenhead, part of Hart, part of Surrey Heath, part of Guildford, part of Runnymede, and part of Waverley	Buckinghamshire, Oxfordshire and Berkshire West ICB; Frimley ICB	→ Surrey wards to join new Surrey and Sussex ICB
South East	NHS Frimley Integrated Care Board	Bracknell Forest, Rushmoor, Slough, Windsor and Maidenhead, part of Hart, part of Surrey Heath, part of Guildford, part of Runnymede, and part of Waverley	Buckinghamshire, Oxfordshire and Berkshire West ICB; Frimley ICB	NHS Hampshire and Isle of Wight ICB (As before, with the addition of Hampshire wards from Frimley ICB)
South East	NHS Hampshire and Isle of Wight Integrated Care Board	Basingstoke and Deane, East Hampshire, Eastleigh, Fareham, Gosport, Havant, the Isle of Wight, New Forest, Portsmouth, Southampton, Test Valley, Winchester, and part of Hart	-	NHS Hampshire and Isle of Wight ICB (As before, with the addition of Hampshire wards from Frimley ICB)
South East	NHS Kent and Medway Integrated Care Board	Ashford, Canterbury, Dartford, Dover, Folkestone and Hythe, Gravesham, Maidstone, Medway, Sevenoaks, Swale, Thanet, Tonbridge and Malling, and Tunbridge Wells	-	-
South East	NHS Surrey Heartlands Integrated Care Board	Elmbridge, Epsom and Ewell, Mole Valley, Reigate and Banstead, Spelthorne, Tandridge, Woking, part of Guildford, part of Runnymede, part of Chichester, part of Surrey Heath, and part of Waverley	Surrey Heartlands ICB; Sussex ICB	NHS Surrey and Sussex ICB (Surrey and Sussex ICBs, plus Surrey wards from the former Frimley ICB)
South East	NHS Sussex Integrated Care Board	Adur, Arun, Brighton and Hove, Crawley, Eastbourne, Hastings, Horsham, Lewes, Mid Sussex, Rother, Wealden, Worthing, and part of Chichester	Surrey Heartlands ICB; Sussex ICB	NHS Surrey and Sussex ICB (Surrey and Sussex ICBs, plus Surrey wards from the former Frimley ICB)
South West	NHS Bath and North East Somerset, Swindon and Wiltshire Integrated Care Board	Bath and North East Somerset, Swindon, Wiltshire, and part of the Vale of White Horse	Bath and North East Somerset, Swindon and Wiltshire ICB; Dorset ICB; Somerset ICB	-
South West	NHS Dorset Integrated Care Board	Bournemouth, Christchurch and Poole, and Dorset	Bath and North East Somerset, Swindon and Wiltshire ICB; Dorset ICB; Somerset ICB	-
South West	NHS Somerset Integrated Care Board	Mendip, Sedgemoor, Somerset West and Taunton, and South Somerset	Bath and North East Somerset, Swindon and Wiltshire ICB; Dorset ICB; Somerset ICB	-
South West	NHS Bristol, North Somerset and South Gloucestershire Integrated Care Board	Bristol, North Somerset, and South Gloucestershire	Bristol, North Somerset and South Gloucestershire ICB; Gloucestershire ICB	-
South West	NHS Gloucestershire Integrated Care Board	Cheltenham, Cotswold, Forest of Dean, Gloucester, Stroud, and Tewkesbury	Bristol, North Somerset and South Gloucestershire ICB; Gloucestershire ICB	-
South West	NHS Cornwall and The Isles of Scilly Integrated Care Board	Cornwall and the Isles of Scilly	Cornwall and Isles of Scilly ICB; Devon ICB	-
South West	NHS Devon Integrated Care Board	East Devon, Exeter, Mid Devon, North Devon, Plymouth, South Hams, Teignbridge, Torbay, Torridge, and West Devon	Cornwall and Isles of Scilly ICB; Devon ICB	-
