= Vanguard Healthcare =

Care home operator in the United Kingdom

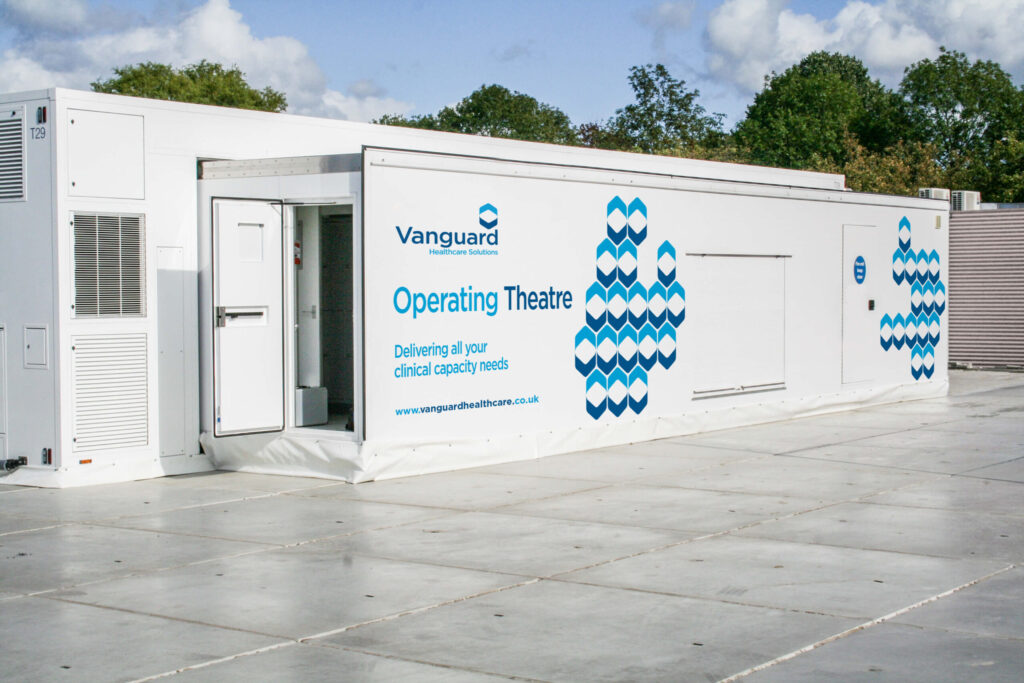
- An outpatient clinic
- Type: Private limited company
- Founded: 1999
- Headquarters: Gloucester, United Kingdom
- Website: vanguardhealthcare.co.uk

Vanguard Healthcare Solutions Ltd. is a British company based in Gloucester that provides mobile clinical facilities and healthcare solutions.

== History ==
=== 1999-2003 ===
The company was established in 1999 as part of Cardinal Healthcare. Cardinal Healthcare was acquired by InHealth Group in 2002 and the mobile service's management team formed Vanguard Healthcare. In 2003 it had 6 mobile theatres and two wards in use, and in some cases provided staff as well as buildings.

=== 2004–2009 ===
The company was bought by Nuffield Health in 2004. In April 2009 it again became an independent company following a management buyout backed by MML Capital Partners.

=== 2014 ===
In 2014 it has 40 mobile surgical units and claims to be the single largest fleet of mobile surgical facilities in the world. It operates across Europe and in Australia. Mike Farrar was employed as a Strategic Advisor in March 2014. The company made an “operating profit” of £1.6m in 2013/4 but the cost servicing loans from MML meant that it paid no corporation tax - and hasn't since 2009.

=== 2020 ===
In 2020 Vanguard acquired Young Medical – a healthcare facilities design company based in the Netherlands. This new arm of Vanguard provides modular medical facilities, both temporary and permanent.

=== 2022 ===
In 2022 the company appointed Chris Blackwell-Frost as CEO, previously Chief Strategy Officer at Nuffield Health. Blackwell-Frost succeeded David Cole, who stepped down after six years as CEO.

== Products and services ==
=== Mobile facilities ===
In 2018 Ian Hinitt in his then role as President of IHEEM unveiled Vanguard’s brand-new laminar flow theatre, which he stated was deployed across the UK and the globe featuring “increased space, refined scrub areas, best-in-class lighting and surgeons panel”. A further laminar flow operating theatre was installed at Gilbert Bain Hospital in Lerwick in early 2022 for 12 weeks, which the hospital estimated would support 400 patients with cataract and ear, nose and throat procedures, as well as allowing for joint replacements to be performed for the first time in Shetland. The theatre features:

- an anaesthetic room;
- operating theatre;
- two-bed first-stage recovery area;
- staff changing room; and
- utility areas

Vanguard’s first mobile endoscope decontamination unit was also installed in 2018 at Oxford’s John Radcliffe Hospital, able to decontaminate up to 120 endoscopes per day used in colonoscopies and gastric examinations. In May 2019 Vanguard provided a mobile endoscopy suite to NHS Lothian’s St John’s Hospital, Livingstone to increase capacity for procedures including gastric, bowel and chest procedures. The suite included a reception, waiting area, consulting room, admission/discharge area, procedure room, recovery ward, toilets and changing room, refreshment area, utility areas, clean processing room, one-way flow for scopes, pass-through endoscope washer/ disinfector, dedicated decontamination area, and an ultraviolet light endoscope storage cabinet and had HEPA filtered environmental air.

In 2021 the company provided a dual-procedure endoscopy suite at Fairfield General Hospital with a laminar-flow theatre, two procedure rooms, a six-bed recovery bay and two consultation rooms, in a multi-room bespoke temporary modular building. It provides colonoscopy, sigmoidoscopy, and gastroscopy seven days a week for patients across Greater Manchester.

The company entered into a contract to perform cataract surgery for Taunton and Somerset NHS Foundation Trust in May 2014 using a mobile unit in a car park at Musgrove Park Hospital. The contract was quickly stopped when patients came back to the Trust's casualty department with a high rate of complication following surgery. A report on the incident was released on 16 October. Vanguard chief executive Ian Gillespie said: "No issues have been identified with the Vanguard mobile theatre facility itself."^{[4]} It was unclear who would be liable for any clinical negligence claims. Colin Close, the trust's medical director, was quoted by the Somerset County Gazette saying: “Any financial responsibility would rest with us. If any patients wish to pursue compensation, we would work with them,” but the Trust said Dr Close had been misquoted. According to the Department of Health the NHS standard contract requires all contractors of NHS care “to hold and maintain adequate and appropriate indemnity insurance”. Mr. Gillespie said that it “has appropriate cover in place”.

In October 2018 Vanguard installed an eight-bedded mobile ward at Hereford County Hospital to manage increased demand and winter pressures on hospital services.

Mobile theatre units were installed at Goole and District Hospital in early November 2018, which Northern Lincolnshire and Goole NHS Foundation Trust (NLaG) stated would help to increase its operational capacity by an estimated 120 procedures a month for the six months spent there.

In late 2019 Vanguard launched its latest mobile central sterile services department (CSSD), stating that it is ‘one of the first of its kind’ providing a high specification, temporary facility for intense cleaning and sterilisation of items used in procedures by hospital surgeons and clinical staff. The unit includes:

- a pre-cleaning station with built-in ultrasonic cleaner;
- washer-disinfectors and steam sterilisers;
- a packing area;
- an independent plant room;
- an electronic data centre;
- staff welfare areas; and
- HEPA-filtered environmental air.

Vanguard Healthcare Solutions says that the new mobile CSSD received over 350 visitors at the launch event.

The company also provided a mobile CSSD to the Medical Centre Leeuwarden while their CSSD department was under renovation. The unit was self-sufficient and had a surface area of 120m^{2}. It was fully-equipped, with a ‘precleaning station with a built-in ultrasonic cleaner, Getinge washer disinfectors and steam sterilisers, a water treatment installation, compressed air supply, an electronic data centre and HEPA filtered air treatment installation’.

In November 2019, Vanguard installed mobile laminar theatres on site at Russells Hall Hospital in Dudley to support with orthopaedic surgeries, following a successful previous contract undertaken while the Trust refurbished its orthopaedic theatre facilities. The mobile theatre provided an anaesthetic room, operating theatre, two bed first-stage recovery area, staff changing room, and utility areas, plus a specially-constructed corridor and ramps which joined the main body of the hospital to the unit for a more seamless patient journey.

Following a pilot project with Buckinghamshire Healthcare NHS Trust in 2019, the company built a bespoke mobile theatre to support the ophthalmology team with a backlog of cataract surgeries over the course of two years.

In 2023, Vanguard provided a mobile laminar flow theatre to Wharfedale Hospital in Otley, forming part of an elective care hub. The hub treats patients across a number of specialties including urology, plastic surgery, maxillofacial, colorectal, breast and vascular surgical procedures. The mobile laminar flow theatre provides an anaesthetic room, operating theatre, two-bed first-stage recovery area, staff changing room and utility areas.

=== Modular facilities ===
The company provided what it called a 'bespoke modular solution' for interventional radiology procedures to Lancashire Teaching Hospitals NHS Foundation Trust during a refurbishment period. The completed module included a bed bay, plant room and standard theatre with HVAC system providing 27 fresh air changes per hour. Royal Preston hospital received a second mobile theatre from Vanguard Healthcare to increase surgical capacity after a significant backlog in elective surgery.

Alongside a mobile laminar flow theatre provided to Wharfedale Hospital in Otley, Vanguard also built two bespoke modular buildings, which created extra storage and staff welfare facilities.

During the COVID-19 pandemic in 2020 Vanguard installed a new 18-bed, 600sqm modular ward at Kettering General Hospital to provide extra capacity.

=== Temporary facilities ===
In 2019, Vanguard created a temporary minor injuries unit (MIU) at the Royal Infirmary of Edinburgh, NHS Lothian, allowing them to divert non-urgent cases away from the hospital’s busy emergency department.
