= City Hospitals Sunderland NHS Foundation Trust =

NHS hospital trust

Chesterfield Royal Hospital NHS Foundation Trust
- Type: NHS hospital trust
- Established: 1 January 2005 -->
- Region served: NHS
- Budget: £306 million
- Hospitals: Sunderland Royal Hospital; Sunderland Eye Infirmary
- Chair: Mahmud Nawaz
- Chief executive: Dr. Hal Spencer
- Staff: 4,973

City Hospitals Sunderland NHS Foundation Trust was established as an NHS Trust in April 1994 and became an NHS Foundation Trust in July 2004, providing services in Sunderland, Tyne and Wear, England. It operates Sunderland Royal Hospital, Sunderland Eye Infirmary, The Children’s Centre, Durham Road and Church View Medical Practice. It is building a new diagnostic and treatment centre in Durham.

In May 2018 it agreed to merge with South Tyneside NHS Foundation Trust to form South Tyneside and Sunderland NHS Foundation Trust. The merger completed in April 2019.

All inpatient stroke services, obstetrics, inpatient gynaecology and specialist care for babies from South Tyneside District Hospital are to be centralised at Sunderland Royal Hospital.

== Subsidiary company ==
In 2017 the trust established a subsidiary company, City Hospitals Sunderland Commercial Enterprises Limited, to which 250 estates and facilities staff were transferred. The intention was to achieve VAT benefits, as well as pay bill savings, by recruiting new staff on less expensive non-NHS contracts. VAT benefits arise because NHS trusts can only claim VAT back on a small subset of goods and services they buy. The Value Added Tax Act 1994 provides a mechanism through which NHS trusts can qualify for refunds on contracted out services.

== Performance ==
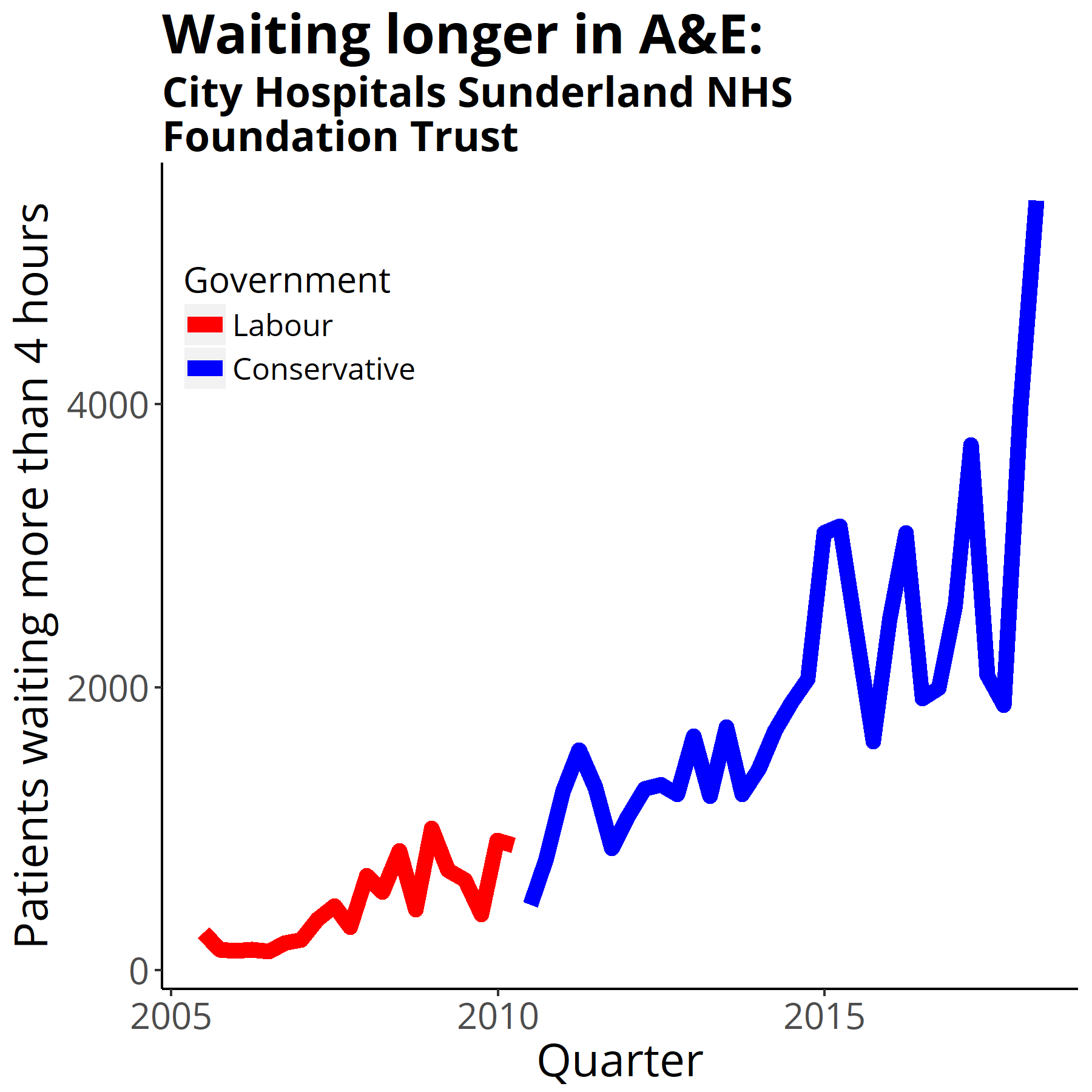
Four-hour target in the emergency department quarterly figures from NHS England Data from https://www.england.nhs.uk/statistics/statistical-work-areas/ae-waiting-times-and-activity/

The trust paid £1,353,544 to private companies to help provide medical and nursing staff cover between January 2013 and January 2014, and a further £1,294,950 in 2014, principally for endoscopy work.

In September 2016, the trust was selected by NHS England as one of twelve Global Digital Exemplars.

Emeli Sande was born at Sunderland Royal.

== See also ==
- List of NHS trusts
