= Taunton and Somerset NHS Foundation Trust =

NHS hospital trust

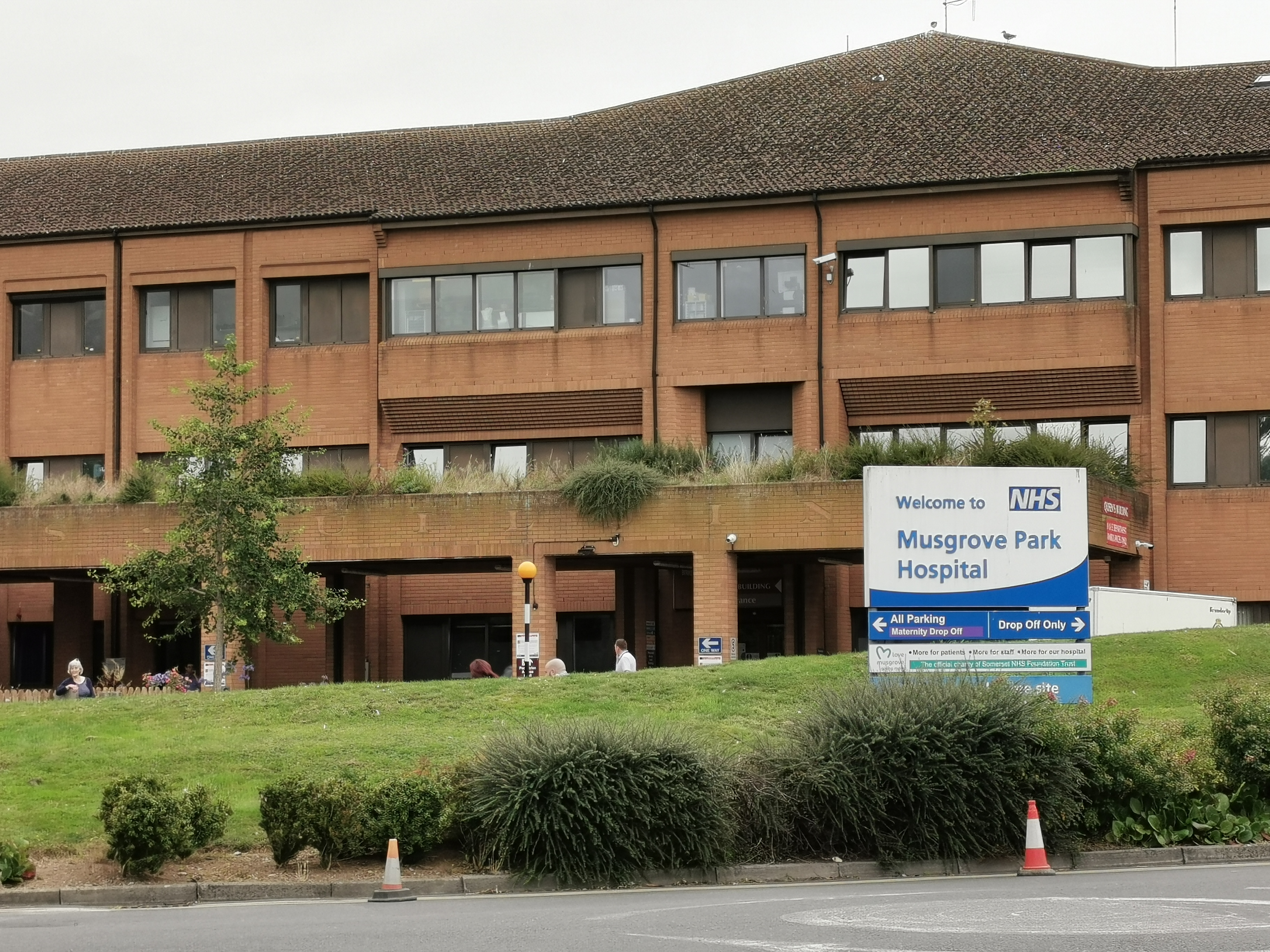
- Musgrove Park Hospital formerly managed by Taunton and Somerset NHS Foundation Trust
- Former name: Taunton and Somerset NHS Trust
- Type: NHS foundation trust
- Established: 1 December 2007
- Disbanded: 1 April 2020
- Headquarters: Musgrove Park Hospital, Parkfield Drive, Taunton, TA1 5DA
- Hospitals: Musgrove Park Hospital
- Chair: Colin Drummond
- Chief executive: Sam Barrell

Taunton and Somerset NHS Foundation Trust was an NHS trust which managed Musgrove Park Hospital in Taunton, Somerset, England. It merged with Somerset Partnership NHS Foundation Trust to form Somerset NHS Foundation Trust in 2020.

== History ==
On 1 April 1991, the Taunton and Somerset NHS Trust became operational to manage services provided by Musgrove Park Hospital. The Trust achieved NHS foundation trust status on 1 December 2007. Sam Barrell was appointed Chief Executive in February 2015.

== Merger ==
The trust submitted a bid in 2014 to take over Weston Area Health NHS Trust, which had announced that it was not viable in its present form, but the bid was not successful.

In 2018, the trust announced plans to merge with Somerset Partnership NHS Foundation Trust, a mental health trust. The merger completed in 2020, forming Somerset NHS Foundation Trust.

== Finance ==
In 2015–2016 the trust anticipated a budget deficit of around £5 million.

The trust had a radiotherapy unit in a building constructed using the private finance initiative. It received an additional £800,000 per year from the commissioners to assist with the extra costs this imposed, but had a shortfall of £3.3M as a result.

The trust set up a joint venture, Southwest Pathology Services, with Yeovil District Hospital NHS Foundation Trust and Integrated Pathology Partnerships in 2012. All routine pathology, apart from histopathology, were then performed at a separate site which also handles GP tests. Essential service laboratories were established in the hospitals for urgent tests. Turnround times for both GP and hospital tests has improved and costs were reduced.

== Performance ==
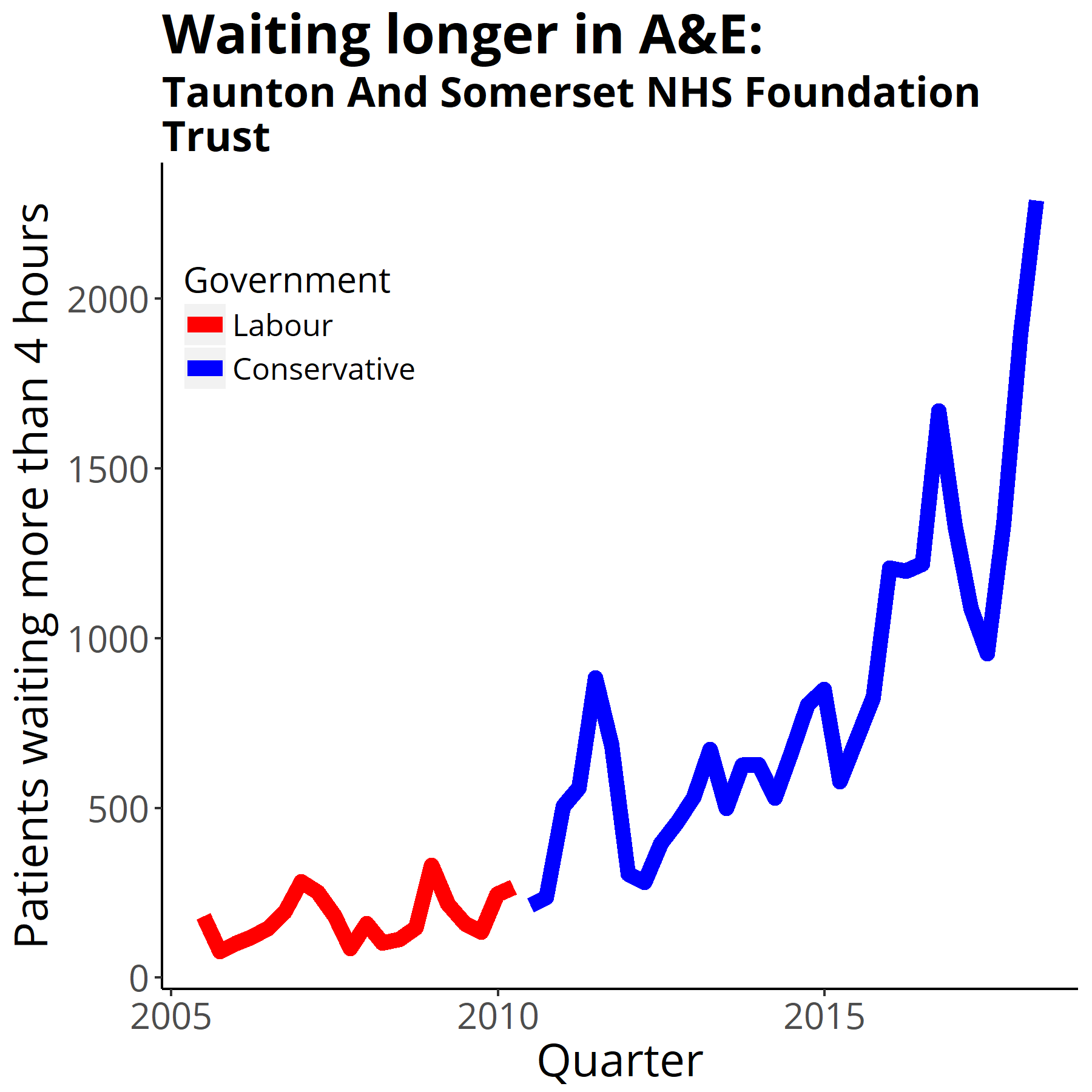
Four-hour target in the emergency department quarterly figures from NHS England Data from https://www.england.nhs.uk/statistics/statistical-work-areas/ae-waiting-times-and-activity/

In September 2016, the trust was selected by NHS England as one of twelve Global Digital Exemplars.

=== Cataract surgery controversy ===
In May 2014, the trust drew up a £320,000 contract with Vanguard Healthcare Solutions to bring down the list of 400 patients waiting for cataract surgery. The company agreed to perform 20 cataract operations per day in a mobile theatre. It in turn sub-contracted to The Practice PLC, to provide two surgeons. They in turn sub-contracted to Kestrel Ophthalmics for the provision of a phacoemulsification machine, the hand pieces needed for surgery and the operating fluids and eye drops. 62 patients had surgery and only 25 had a "normal recovery", which is a complication rate ten times greater than would normally be expected. Operations took place on 2, 3 and 4 May. On 6 and 7 May, patients came to the Trust's casualty department with severe corneal decompensation and the performance of the contract was stopped on 9 May.

A report was produced in October 2014, which the trust claimed it wanted to publish but was advised not to do so for fear that it would be defamatory and open the hospital up to legal action. It was however leaked to The Guardian. Staff and patients were told that "a number of factors" led to an "unusually high level of complications". The report was eventually released on 16 October. It was criticised by the son of one of the patients who demanded that an independent investigation should examine what risk assessments the hospital carried out before outsourcing the work, a topic not covered in the report.

== See also ==
- Healthcare in Somerset
- List of NHS trusts in England
