= Radio Sunderland for Hospitals =

- Sunderland; England
- Broadcast area: Sunderland Royal Hospital and the St Benedict's Hospice
- Frequencies: Hospedia and online via their website

History
- First air date: 1953

Links
- Website: https://www.radiosunderland.co.uk/

Radio Sunderland is the hospital radio station for Sunderland Royal Hospital and the St Benedict's Hospice in the City of Sunderland, England. On the air since 1953, the station provides music, entertainment and information for patients. Since August 1998 the station has been broadcasting continuously 24 hours a day.

Programmes include Ward Call (patients request and dedications), specialist programmes covering country, classical, dance, jazz, easy listening and world music, extensive sports coverage, general entertainment and information for patients.

Radio Sunderland provides full match commentary of all Sunderland A.F.C. home matches live from the Stadium of Light with their own commentary team.

Radio Sunderland is a registered charity and relies entirely on donations and fundraising to stay on the air. The station is run entirely by volunteers, no one is paid for the services they give.

== The Story of Radio Sunderland ==
The association's inaugural meeting was held in 1953 following a plea in the local newspaper, The Sunderland Echo, for volunteers. Broadcasting commenced during the 1954/1955 football season. The station was formed as the Commentators' Association in 1953. The aim was to relay live football commentaries form Roker Park direct to the wards of Sunderland's Hospitals.

During those early years, in a cup tie with Spurs an over enthusiastic commentator jumped up to help a Sunderland forward head in a goal, but he forgot about the low roof of the commentary box and knocked himself out. One of the other commentators, in true Hospital Radio fashion, grabbed the microphone and carried on with the commentary!

Music was introduced to the station output with the advent of the first patients request programme "Hospital Hour", first broadcast on Boxing day 1956. This marked the beginning of programme development. Other programmes at that time included commentaries on athletics from Ashbrooke Sports Ground and Hospital Quiz shows.

Reflecting the wider programming, and following an influx of volunteers the association changed its name to "Sunderland Hospitals Broadcasts" in 1968 and was now broadcasting regular programmes from the old General Hospital in Sunderland on Thursday and Friday evenings.

This was followed by a move to the first permanent studio which was based in an old ward at what was the Havelock Hospital on Hylton Road. Equipment was begged and borrowed, Tyne Tees Television being a major benefactor, donating their old surplus equipment. Due to the enthusiasm and expertise of the then members, the ward was converted into a fully equipped radio studio.

Now that they had a studio and a full and varied programme schedule it was decided that they should have a new snappier identification, so the present name of "Radio Sunderland for Hospitals" was adopted in 1973.

When the new District General Hospital (now called the Sunderland Royal) was opened in 1978 the station transferred to a new but very small studio in the Hylton Road Block. Following a vigorous campaign for more working space they were on the move once again & in 1988 the station transferred to its present location in the former nurses home of Monkwearmouth Hospital. Much of the equipment from the General Hospital Studio was transferred to the new studio but the members still set themselves a target of raising £30,000 to build and equip this new studio complex.
