= Yeovil Hospital =

- Somerset NHS Foundation Trust
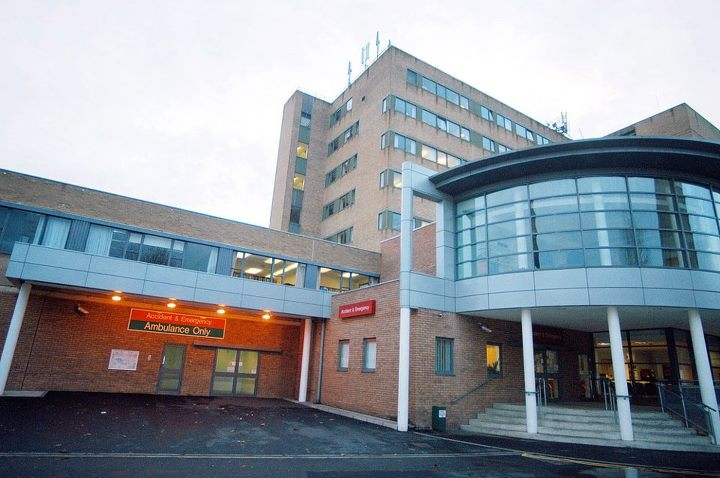
- Yeovil District Hospital in 2011

- Shown in Somerset

Geography
- Location: Yeovil, Somerset, England
- Coordinates: 50.9452°N 2.6339°W

Organisation
- Care system: National Health Service
- Type: District General

Services
- Emergency department: Yes
- Beds: 330

History
- Founded: 1973

Links
- Website: www.somersetft.nhs.uk/yeovilhospital/

Yeovil Hospital, previously known as Yeovil District Hospital, is a hospital in Yeovil, Somerset, England, managed by Somerset NHS Foundation Trust.

The hospital provides acute care for a population of about 180,000, people living in South Somerset, North and West Dorset, and parts of Mendip. The hospital admits around 30,000 inpatients or day cases each year and treats more than 90,000 people in the outpatient appointments. Approximately 40,000 people are treated in Accident and Emergency and 1,300 babies are born in the maternity unit each year.

== History ==
The hospital has its origins in a general dispensary established at the suggestion of Dr Elias Taylor Warry in a cottage in Kingston in March 1858. This was replaced by a purpose-built facility at Batt's Corner known as Fiveways Hospital in 1872. This was, in turn, replaced by an improved facility in Bide's Gardens which was designed by Paul Waterhouse and officially opened as Yeovil General Hospital by the Prince of Wales on 19 July 1923. It joined the National Health Service in 1948.

The current facility was designed by Sir Percy Thomas & Son and construction started in Higher Kingston in 1968. It was officially opened by Prince Edward, Duke of Kent on 15 October 1973. It was refurbished, creating a new coronary care unit, intensive care unit and private patient ward at a cost of £9.3 million, in 2000. A 24-bed extension was completed in April 2016.

On 1 April 2023, Yeovil District Hospital NHS Foundation Trust merged with Somerset NHS Foundation Trust, which now manages the hospital.

On 13 May 2025, it was announced that the special care baby unit and inpatient maternity services at Yeovil Hospital would be suspended for 6 months after a warning notice was issued by the CQC. Since 19 May 2025, expectant mothers have had to travel to either Musgrove Park Hospital in Taunton, Dorset County Hospital in Dorchester or Royal United Hospital in Bath to receive maternity care. Maternity and special care baby services will be reinstated on 21 April 2026.

== Notable staff ==
Between 1900 and 1941 three successive matrons of Yeovil Hospital had trained at The London Hospital under Eva Luckes.

- Sarah Harriet Harris, (1860–1950), matron between 1900 and 1912. Harris had previously been matron of Taunton and Somerset Hospital between 1894 and 1898.
- Eleanor Rayner, (1867–1949), was previously matron of Trowbridge Cottage Hospital between 1906-1907.Matron of Yeovil between 1913 and 1917.
- Ruth Anderson, (1880–1944), matron for twenty five years between 1917 and 1941.
