= Taunton and Somerset Hospital =

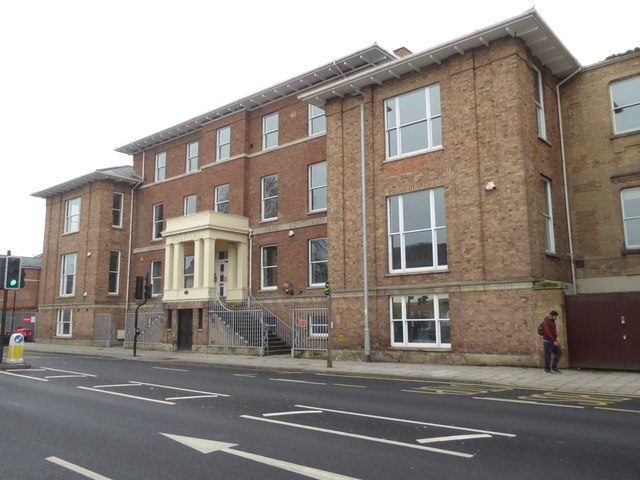
- Taunton and Somerset Hospital

- Shown in Somerset

Geography
- Location: Taunton, Somerset, England, United Kingdom
- Coordinates: 51°00′56″N 3°05′30″W

Organisation
- Care system: Public NHS

Services
- Emergency department: No Accident & Emergency

History
- Founded: 1812

Links
- Lists: Hospitals in England

Taunton and Somerset Hospital was a hospital in Taunton, Somerset.

== History ==
The hospital was erected between 1809 and 1812 in East Reach in the centre of Taunton. The hospital was managed along with other hospitals in Taunton and in 1968 the management committee was renamed the West Somerset Hospital Management Committee. The main block of the hospital was Grade II listed in 1975. Taunton and Somerset Hospital closed in 1986, and the services moved out to Musgrove Park Hospital.

== Notable staff ==
Three matrons who ran the hospital in succession all trained at The London Hospital under Eva Luckes.

- Sarah Harriet Harris (1860–1950), matron 1894, to 1898, trained between 1888 and 1890. Harris was matron of Yeovil Hospital between 1900 and 1912.
- Louisa Lessey, (1863–1956), matron between 1899 and 1900, trained between 1891 and 1894.
- Katherine Bulteel, (1863–1907), matron from 1900 until her death in July 1907. Bulteel trained between 1893 and 1896.
