= Sam Barrell =

English physician

Dr Sam Barrell CBE is an English doctor. She joined the medical research charity LifeArc as chief executive officer in October 2024. Previously, she was Deputy Chief Executive Officer at the Francis Crick Institute in London where she was responsible for strategic management and operational leadership, as well as deputising for the Director, Sir Paul Nurse.

She was appointed Chief Executive of Taunton and Somerset NHS Foundation Trust in February 2015. In September 2016, the Trust was one of 16 acute hospitals named by the Department of Health as a digital exemplar for the NHS. In December 2017 the Care Quality Commission rated the trust "Good" overall, and outstanding in its care. From 2012 she was chief clinical office at South Devon and Torbay Clinical Commissioning Group where she called for the suspension of Dr Paula Vasco-Knight, chief e of South Devon Healthcare NHS Foundation Trust who was accused of nepotism.

Barrell was previously a GP in Brixham where she led GP commissioning in Torbay, and promoted the town's integrated commissioning and provision arrangements nationally. She was a member of the Joined-up Health and Care Cabinet which was a pioneer of integrated care in the English NHS.

She was appointed a CBE in the 2014 Queen's Birthday Honours, and was named one of the 50 most inspirational people in healthcare by the Health Service Journal which described her as one of the new breed of clinical leaders spearheading transformation of the NHS.

Barrell is a non-executive director for Assura plc and a member of British Land's Innovation Advisory Council.
