= South Tyneside NHS Foundation Trust =

Former NHS hospital trust

South Tyneside NHS Foundation Trust was the National Health Service trust responsible for managing South Tyneside District Hospital.

== History ==
The trust was authorised as a foundation trust on 1 January 2005. It merged with City Hospitals Sunderland NHS Foundation Trust to form South Tyneside and Sunderland NHS Foundation Trust in April 2019.

== Performance ==
It achieved the bronze status Investors in People Award in 2015. It was named by the Health Service Journal as one of the top hundred NHS trusts to work for in 2015. At that time it had 3818 full time equivalent staff and a sickness absence rate of 5.71%. 63% of staff recommend it as a place for treatment and 57% recommended it as a place to work. The trust reported a 6.7% staff absence rate, the highest in England in 2014/5.

The trust's staffing costs are said to be 10% higher than comparable organisations. It has had the highest staff sickness absence rate of any acute trust in England for four years in a row, with an average rate of 5.6% of days lost to sickness absence for the first three quarters of 2016-17.
