= Melanie Lee =

British biologist

Melanie Georgina Lee CBE (born 29 July 1958) is an English pharmaceutical industry executive and CEO of LifeArc, succeeding Dave Tapolczay in November 2018.

== Career ==
=== Research ===
"Paul and Melanie's paper started a revolution in cell cycle research."

— Kathleen Weston

Lee received an undergraduate degree in Biology from the University of York, working with Simon Hardy, and then a PhD at National Institute for Medical Research in London.

Lee worked as a molecular genetics postdoc, first at Imperial College London on yeast and then from 1985 with Paul Nurse at the ICRF's Lincoln's Inn Laboratories. Nurse's work on the cell cycle won him the Nobel Prize, and in his speech he cited Lee's work on finding a human homologue of the yeast gene cdc2. Nurse said of this work that "I suppose the most astonishing thing was the way Melanie Lee in the lab did it by complementation." Lee later recounted being uncomfortable with the competition in the laboratory.

In 2003, she was elected a Fellow of the Academy of Medical Sciences.

=== Works ===
- Lee, Melanie G.; Nurse, Paul (7 May 1987). "Complementation used to clone a human homologue of the fission yeast cell cycle control gene cdc2". Nature. 327 (6117): 31–5. Bibcode:1987Natur.327...31L. doi:10.1038/327031a0. PMID 3553962. S2CID 4300190.

=== Business ===
Lee was appointed chief executive officer of LifeArc in November 2018. Lee currently serves on the Board of Directors at Sanofi and on the Board of Trustees at the Dementia Research Institute. Previously, she was chief scientific officer of BGT Plc and was the founder and CEO of NightstaRx, a Syncona, Wellcome Trust company in 2014.

She began her pharmaceutical industry career at Glaxo in 1988, leaving academia after she became pregnant. She joined Celltech in 1998 where she was Director of R&D. She held the same role at UCB Pharmaceuticals and was CEO of Syntaxin Ltd from 2010 to 2013. She had Chair and Deputy Chair Trustee appointments at Cancer Research Technology and Cancer Research UK respectively. She was on the board of Lundbeck and founded the Think10 business advice company.

She was an advisor to the 2014–15 Dowling Review of business-university research collaborations.

== Awards ==
In January 2019, Lee was awarded the BIA Lifetime Achievement Award. She received a CBE in 2009 in respect of her for services to medical science and in 2014, she was named as one of the top 100 "leading practising scientists" in the UK by the Science Council.

== Personal life ==
She is married to Christopher, with whom she lives in London. They have two sons.
