= Global Digital Exemplar =

The Global Digital Exemplar (GDE) programme is an NHS England initiative to achieve digital transformation in selected exemplar organisations and to create a knowledge sharing ecosystem to spread learning from these exemplars. The programme is to enable "digitally advanced" NHS trusts to share knowledge with other NHS trusts, specifically knowledge gained during the implementation of IT systems, and especially experience from introducing electronic health record (EHR) systems. The GDE project is expected to last two to three and a half years; with the most digitally advanced trusts on the shorter time scale.

Four rounds of exemplars have been announced so far — two waves of acute trust GDEs, and one wave each of ambulance trusts, and mental health trusts. In addition, eighteen acute trust "fast followers" have been partnered with the acute trusts.

The programme involves the investment of £395 million. Each GDE will receive "up to £10 million" to spend on digital projects. The funding must be matched locally, but not necessarily in cash.

== Programme elements ==
Each Global Digital Exemplar (GDE) received £10 million and their matched Fast Followers (FFs) received £5 million (£5 million for GDEs and £3 million for FFs in mental health); and they were required to secure matched funding internally. The Healthcare Information and Management Systems Society (HIMSS) Electronic Medical Record Adoption Model (EMRAM) was chosen as a guide for programme outputs, with GDEs expect to obtain HIMSS Level 7 and FFs, HIMSS Level 5.

The partnerships between GDEs and FFs constitute a formal mechanism to support knowledge transfer. The programme also introduced the idea of "Blueprints", documents describing how to implement digital technologies in healthcare.

== Exemplars ==
=== Acute exemplars ===
The first twelve exemplars were announced in 2016. A second wave added another four in 2017.

Although NHS England refers to this grouping of exemplars as "acute", a number of the hospitals operated by trusts within this group are specialised hospitals. Examples include, Alder Hey Children's Hospital and Western Eye Hospital.

==== North ====
- Alder Hey Children's Hospital NHS Foundation Trust
- City Hospitals Sunderland NHS Foundation Trust
- Newcastle upon Tyne Hospitals NHS Foundation Trust
- Royal Liverpool and Broadgreen University Hospitals NHS Trust
- Salford Royal NHS Foundation Trust
- Wirral University Teaching Hospital NHS Foundation Trust

==== Midlands and East ====
- Cambridge University Hospitals NHS Foundation Trust
- University Hospitals Birmingham NHS Foundation Trust
- Luton and Dunstable University Hospital NHS Foundation Trust
- West Suffolk NHS Foundation Trust

==== London ====
- Royal Free London NHS Foundation Trust
- Imperial College Healthcare NHS Trust and Chelsea and Westminster Hospital NHS Foundation Trust (as a joint Exemplar)

==== South ====
- Oxford University Hospitals NHS Foundation Trust
- Taunton and Somerset NHS Foundation Trust
- University Hospitals Bristol NHS Foundation Trust
- University Hospital Southampton NHS Foundation Trust

==== Fast followers ====
There are eighteen acute "fast follower" trusts, each of which has been partnered with an acute GDE.

Global Digital Exemplar	Fast Follower	EPR provider
Alder Hey Children's NHS Foundation Trust	Clatterbridge Cancer Centre NHS Foundation Trust	Meditech
Cambridge University Hospitals NHS Foundation Trust	University College London Hospitals NHS Foundation Trust	Epic Systems
City Hospitals Sunderland NHS Foundation Trust	South Tyneside NHS Foundation Trust	Meditech
Imperial College Healthcare NHS Trust	Chelsea and Westminster Hospital NHS Foundation Trust	
Luton & Dunstable University Hospital NHS Foundation Trust	Bedford Hospital NHS Trust	
Newcastle upon Tyne Hospitals NHS Foundation Trust	Gateshead Health NHS Foundation Trust	Cerner
Oxford University Hospitals NHS Foundation Trust	Royal Berkshire NHS Foundation Trust	
Royal Free London NHS Foundation Trust	North Middlesex University Hospital NHS Trust	
Royal Liverpool and Broadgreen University Hospitals NHS Trust	Liverpool Women's NHS Foundation Trust; North Tees and Hartlepool NHS Foundation Trust	InterSystems
Salford Royal NHS Foundation Trust	Pennine Acute Hospitals NHS Trust	Allscripts
Taunton and Somerset NHS Foundation Trust	Blackpool Teaching Hospitals NHS Foundation Trust; Wye Valley NHS Trust	
University Hospitals Birmingham NHS Foundation Trust	Heart of England NHS Foundation Trust	
University Hospitals Bristol NHS Foundation Trust	The Whittington Hospital	
University Hospitals Southampton NHS Foundation Trust	Hampshire Hospitals NHS Foundation Trust	
West Suffolk NHS Foundation Trust	Milton Keynes University Hospital NHS Foundation Trust	
Wirral University Teaching Hospital NHS Foundation Trust	Countess of Chester Hospital NHS Foundation Trust	Cerner

=== Ambulance exemplars ===
As of July 2018, there are three ambulance trust exemplars.

- South Central Ambulance Service NHS Foundation Trust
- West Midlands Ambulance Service NHS Foundation Trust
- North East Ambulance Service NHS Foundation Trust

=== Mental health exemplars ===
There are currently seven mental health trust GDEs.

- Berkshire Healthcare NHS Foundation Trust
- Birmingham and Solihull Mental Health NHS Foundation Trust
- Mersey Care NHS Foundation Trust
- Northumberland, Tyne and Wear NHS Foundation Trust
- Oxford Health NHS Foundation Trust
- South London and Maudsley NHS Foundation Trust
- Worcestershire Health and Care NHS Trust

== See also ==
- Department of Health and Social Care
- Health informatics
- Health information technology
- NHS Digital
