= Healthcare in Somerset =

Healthcare in Somerset, England has been the responsibility of three integrated care boards (ICBs) since July 2022. These replaced the former clinical commissioning groups (CCGs).

The ICBs cover the ceremonial county of Somerset, which comprises the areas governed by the three unitary authorities of Somerset, North Somerset and Bath and North East Somerset.

Name	Local authority areas covered
NHS Bath and North East Somerset, Swindon and Wiltshire Integrated Care Board	Bath and North East Somerset, Swindon, Wiltshire, and part of the Vale of White Horse
NHS Bristol, North Somerset and South Gloucestershire Integrated Care Board	Bristol, North Somerset, and South Gloucestershire
NHS Somerset Integrated Care Board	Somerset

== History ==
From 1947 to 1965, National Health Service services in Somerset were managed by the South-Western Regional Hospital Board. In 1965, a new board was formed for Wessex which also covered Somerset. In 1974, the boards were abolished and replaced by regional health authorities; the whole of Somerset came under the South West RHA. Regions were reorganised in 1996 and Somerset came under the South and West (Wessex and South Western) Regional Health Authority. Somerset had its own area health authority from 1974 until 1992.

Regional health authorities were reorganised and renamed strategic health authorities in 2002, with Somerset part of Dorset and Somerset SHA. In 2006, regions were again reorganised and Somerset came under NHS South West until that was abolished in 2013. There were three primary care trusts for the area: Bath & North East Somerset PCT, North Somerset PCT, and Somerset PCT. These trusts were abolished in 2013 and replaced by clinical commissioning groups, which were in turn abolished in 2022 and replaced by integrated care systems.

== Sustainability and transformation plans ==
Somerset formed a sustainability and transformation plan area in March 2016 with Dr Matthew Dolman, the Chair of Somerset CCG, as its leader. Bristol, North Somerset and South Gloucestershire formed a separate sustainability and transformation plan area with Robert Woolley, Chief Executive of University Hospitals Bristol NHS Foundation Trust, as its leader, replaced by Stephen Ladyman in 2018.

Taunton and Somerset NHS Foundation Trust (which managed Musgrove Park Hospital in Taunton) and Somerset Partnership NHS Foundation Trust (which was the area's mental health trust) merged in April 2020, forming Somerset NHS Foundation Trust which provides acute, community and mental health services.

In November 2020 plans were announced for a merger between Somerset NHS Foundation Trust and Yeovil District Hospital NHS Foundation Trust. The merger took place on 1 April 2023. This has created England's first provider of primary, acute, community and mental health care services as Yeovil FT owns Symphony Healthcare — a subsidiary company which runs 12 GP practices. From April 2023 there will only be one NHS trust in the entire integrated care system, which will run acute, community, mental health and a significant slice of the county’s primary care services. At the same time Somerset County Council and the county’s four district councils are merging to form a new unitary authority.

== Commissioning ==
The clinical commissioning groups covering Somerset until 2022 were:

- Bath and North East Somerset, Swindon and Wiltshire CCG
- Bristol, North Somerset and South Gloucestershire CCG
- Somerset CCG

The CCG for Bath and North East Somerset proposed to set up a pooled budget with Bath and North East Somerset Council in August 2015. Somerset CCG proposed to set up a "joint health and care board" with a "significantly pooled budget" with Somerset County Council and NHS England after it was rated inadequate in August 2017.

The CCGs for Bristol, North Somerset and South Gloucestershire merged in April 2018, and the Bath and North East Somerset CCG merged with the Swindon and Wiltshire CCGs in April 2020.

== Primary care ==
There are 24 GP practices in Bath and North East Somerset as of 2020. There are 25 in North Somerset CCG, while Somerset CCG has 63 practices grouped into nine GP federations.

Yeovil District Hospital NHS Foundation Trust, now part of Somerset NHS Foundation Trust, set up a subsidiary company, Symphony Healthcare Services, in 2016. It took over the running of three small practices, with a combined registered list of 12,500 in March 2016. Symphony was also forming a partnership with South Somerset Primary Healthcare, to manage an outcomes-based budget for the 120,000 population of South Somerset. In February 2018, it was reported that there had been a 15.6% increase in the emergency admissions rate in the area between 2014/15 and the 12 months to September 2017.

Yeovil walk-in centre opened in 2009 and was closed in 2017. Somerset CCG said too many people were misusing the town centre facility with relatively minor ailments that could be solved by a pharmacist or by ringing 111. It was replaced by an urgent care service at the hospital, open from 10 am to 6 pm on Saturdays and Sundays.

Minehead Medical Centre, which has a patient population of 13,000 and around 50 staff, decided not to join the 15 other practices in Somerset which have opted to join Yeovil District Hospital NHS Foundation Trust but adopted a “John Lewis” model, where every employee owns a non-tradeable share in the company at no extra cost to them. This share is held on their behalf by trustees of the organisation, who are chosen by the practice staff.

== Acute care ==
The main providers of NHS acute hospital care in the county are Somerset NHS Foundation Trust and Royal United Hospitals Bath NHS Foundation Trust. Weston General Hospital is managed by University Hospitals Bristol and Weston NHS Foundation Trust.

Taunton and Somerset NHS Foundation Trust and Somerset Partnership (the county's mental health trust) decided in June 2017 to set up a joint management team overseen by a single chief executive. The same year, North Somerset Clinical Commissioning Group stated Weston Area Health Trust should become "part of a larger organisation" and in 2018 it was announced that Weston General would merge into University Hospitals Bristol NHS Foundation Trust. The merger completed on 1 April 2020.

== Mental health and community services ==
NHS Mental Health services are provided by Somerset NHS Foundation Trust, Avon and Wiltshire Mental Health Partnership NHS Trust and Oxford Health NHS Foundation Trust.

Somerset CCG were planning a significant reduction in community hospital beds provided by the partnership trust. In 2014 there were 312 beds but the CCG considered only 210 were needed, and they were also planning to procure an integrated service for patients with long term conditions. It was also planning a health campus in Shepton Mallet which will have surgical and diagnostic services and medical assessment beds, where the service provider was expected to collaborate closely with local charities and voluntary groups. In January 2020, Somerset CCG announced plans to close the 14-bed St Andrews unit in Wells and move the service to Yeovil, where it would be close to the hospital. A crisis cafe would be established in Wells, and another in Bridgwater.

Since April 2010, Oxford Health NHS Foundation Trust has provided tiers 3 and 4 of Child and Adolescent Mental Health Services (CAMHS) in Bath and North East Somerset following a competitive tender. Previously this service had been operated primarily by the Avon and Wiltshire Mental Health Partnership NHS Trust. The service is jointly funded by the NHS and the local authority.

Virgin Care won a seven-year contract to act as prime provider of community services in Bath and North East Somerset for an annual cost of £69.2 million in December 2016. This includes adult social work services, public health nursing, integrated reablement, speech and language therapy, continuing healthcare and children's community health; most of these services were previously run by Sirona Care & Health. It was intended that the services would be more "joined up" and focussed on preventative care, through setting up hubs aligned with GP practices. In 2021, the services provided were reported to include two community hospitals, outpatients' clinics, and school nursing and immunisation services. Extension of the contract to 2027 was expected to cost £54.5m per year.

In 2019, Sirona Care & Health won a 10-year adult community services contract to start in April 2020. Previously it had provided the service jointly with Bristol Community Health and North Somerset Community Partnership.

Palliative care in the county is provided by several charities. These include St. Margaret's Hospice, which operates from Taunton and Yeovil, Weston Hospicecare in Weston-super-Mare, Children's Hospice South West in Wraxall, and Dorothy House which is based at Winsley, near Bath.

== HealthWatch ==
Healthwatch is an organisation set up under the Health and Social Care Act 2012 to act as a voice for patients. There are three separate local Healthwatches in the county covering Somerset, North Somerset, and Bath and North East Somerset.

== See also ==
- Category:Health in Somerset
- Healthcare in the United Kingdom
