= Laura Sandys =

British politician (born 1964)

The Honourable Laura Sandys CBE
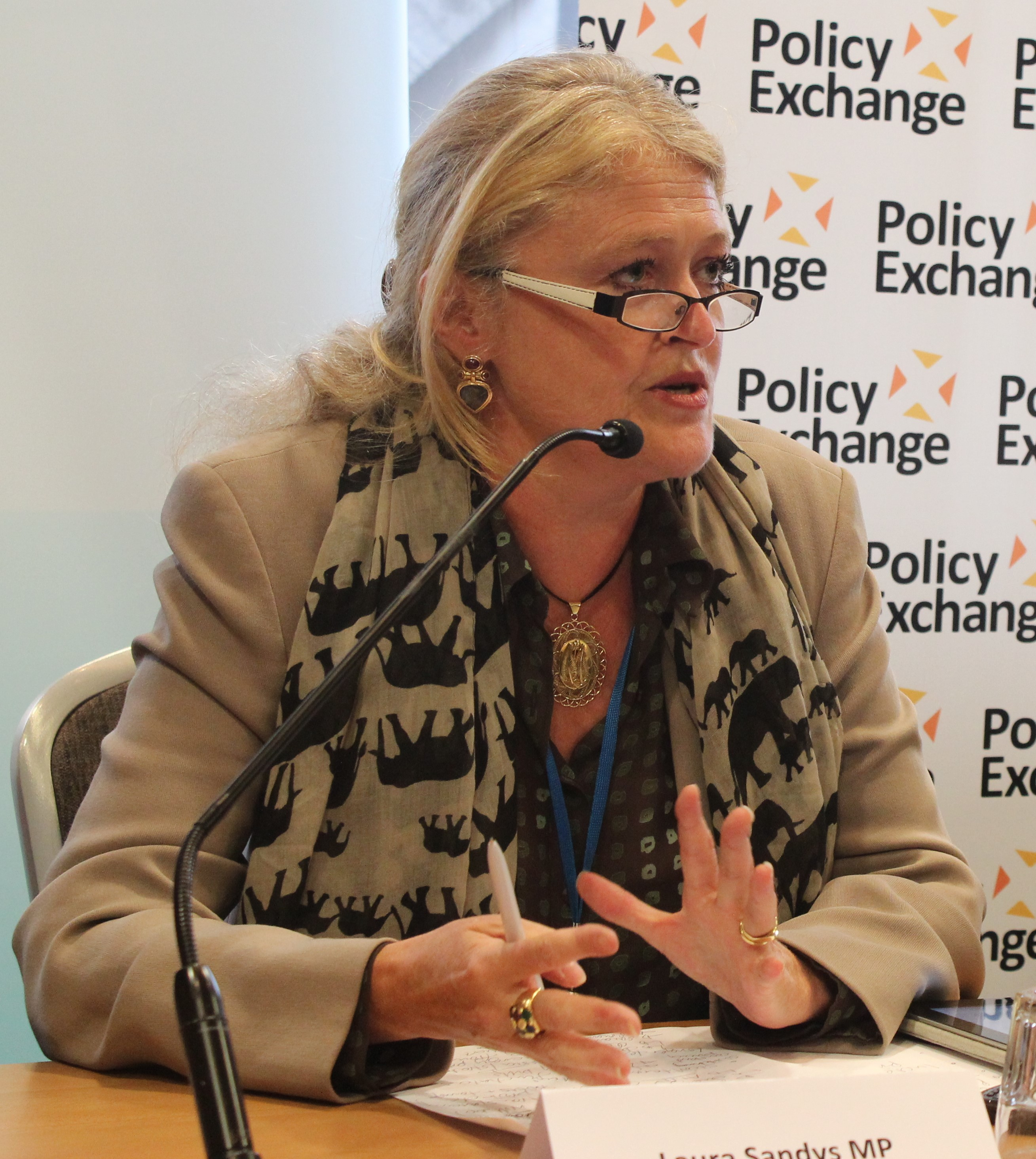
- Sandys in 2012

Member of Parliament for South Thanet
- In office 6 May 2010 – 30 March 2015
- Preceded by: Stephen Ladyman
- Succeeded by: Craig Mackinlay

Personal details
- Born: 5 June 1964 (age 62)
- Party: Conservative
- Spouse: Randolph Kent
- Education: Open University; Wolfson College, Cambridge

Laura Jane Sandys CBE (/sændz/; born 5 June 1964) is a former chair of the European Movement UK, and a British Conservative Party politician, who served as the Member of Parliament (MP) for South Thanet between 2010 and 2015.

== Early life ==
The daughter of Duncan Sandys through his second marriage to Marie-Claire (née Schmitt), Sandys was born on 5 June 1964 and christened on 17 July 1964 in the Crypt Chapel of the Palace of Westminster. Her father was a member of parliament, and later a life peer, who served as Minister of Defence in Harold Macmillan's government and was also the son-in-law of Winston Churchill (through his first marriage to Diana Churchill).

== Career before Parliament ==
In the 1980s, Sandys was a Director of Barter Group, an organisation doing business by exchange of goods or services rather than cash in the former Eastern Bloc. She moved on to lead the Parliamentary Unit at the Consumers' Association. Sandys has also worked in public relations; since 1992 she worked through Laura Sandys Associates, also known by its abbreviation LSA. She later became Head of Communications at the Shopping Hours Reform Council, an organisation which promotes allowing shops to open on Sundays. She is also a journalist, also writing for newspapers, and a commentator appearing on television and radio on a wide range of issues, including urban development and the Iraq war. She contributed the opening chapter Paul Cornish's book The War in Iraq (October 2004).

Sandys completed an Open University course on Environment and Development in 1993 and is currently a trustee of the Open University Foundation, which was established in 1973 as an independent charitable trust to further the objects of the University. She is a non-executive director on the board of openDemocracy; her biography on that site describes her as: "having experience of political structures across Europe, Turkey, South America and the US". The site also states that she has worked as a journalist and policy strategist in Washington D.C. She was appointed a Trustee of the Civic Trust on 18 July 2000 and is a member of its Policy Committee. and was also a Senior Research Associate for the Centre for Defence Studies at King's College London. She also completed a Master's degree in International Relations at Wolfson College, Cambridge in 2003.

== Political career ==
Before the 2005 general election, Sandys applied to be selected as a Conservative candidate in fourteen parliamentary constituencies and was shortlisted in Surrey Heath and Arundel and South Downs. She missed out, however, to Michael Gove and Nick Herbert respectively. With a group of other women Conservatives, Sandys signed a letter in support of David Cameron's election as Conservative Party leader which was printed in The Daily Telegraph in August 2005. Sandys nominated Christabel Flight in the May 2006 Westminster City Council elections.

In 2006, Sandys was placed on the new 'A-list' of Conservative candidates ahead of the 2010 general election. In October 2006, she was selected to stand as the Conservative candidate for South Thanet, defeating Mark MacGregor, the party's previous candidate at the 2001 and 2005 elections. The constituency was then held by Stephen Ladyman for the Labour Party. She lives locally within the constituency in the town of Ramsgate with her husband, Randolph Kent, whom she married on 3 September 2007 in Ramsgate, Kent.

In the 2010 general election, Sandys gained the South Thanet seat from Stephen Ladyman with 48% of the popular vote.

In August 2014, Sandys announced that she would not be standing in the 2015 general election. She explained, "I have been considering my future in light of a wide range of family demands and have decided that I cannot combine the level of dedication and service needed for the constituency with my growing personal responsibilities to those closest and dearest to me."

== After Parliament ==
After leaving Parliament, Sandys founded The Food Foundation, a food policy charity and think tank, which began work in 2015. The foundation was established as an independent body to improve the UK food system, with the aim of making a healthy diet affordable for everyone in the country.

As Chair of the European Movement, Sandys played a role in campaigning to remain in the EU during the 2016 referendum on EU membership. After the result, she resigned as Chair of the Movement and was succeeded by Richard Corbett.

On 30 April 2019, Sandys joined former Labour Party leader Ed Miliband and Caroline Lucas in calling for a Green New Deal in the UK.

Sandys was appointed Commander of the Order of the British Empire (CBE) in the 2020 New Year Honours for services to UK energy policy as chair of the Energy Data Taskforce.

Parliament of the United Kingdom
Preceded by Stephen Ladyman	Member of Parliament for South Thanet; 2010–2015	Succeeded by Craig Mackinlay
