= Somerset NHS Foundation Trust =

NHS trust

- Type: NHS foundation trust
- Established: 1 April 2020
- Headquarters: Yeovil Hospital, Higher Kingston, Yeovil
- Hospitals: Musgrove Park Hospital; Yeovil Hospital
- Chair: Dr Rima Makarem
- Chief executive: Peter Lewis
- Staff: 13,037 WTE (2025-26)
- Website: www.somersetft.nhs.uk

Somerset NHS Foundation Trust is a NHS foundation trust providing services for NHS England in Somerset, England. It manages a number of hospitals providing mental, community and acute hospital care across the whole county.

In April 2023, the trust merged with Yeovil District Hospital NHS Foundation Trust to form a single trust covering the whole county.

== History ==
The trust was formed from the merger of Somerset Partnership NHS Foundation Trust and Taunton and Somerset NHS Foundation Trust on 1 April 2020.

In September 2021 a new diagnostic centre was opened on the outskirts of Taunton near the M5, operating in partnership with Rutherford Health. The centre provides CT scans, magnetic resonance imaging, X-rays, ultrasound and other imaging services. The trust pay a tariff price for activity and is reimbursed for the use of its staff. Rutherford Health went into liquidation in June 2022 and a new contract was developed with Alliance Medical.

In November 2020 a merger with Yeovil District Hospital NHS Foundation Trust was reportedly planned, creating England’s first provider of primary, acute, community and mental health care services. The merger took place on 1 April 2023.

On 13 May 2025, the trust announced that the special care baby unit and inpatient maternity services at Yeovil Hospital would be suspended for six months after a warning notice was issued by the CQC. From 19 May 2025, expectant mothers had to travel to either Musgrove Park Hospital in Taunton, Dorset County Hospital in Dorchester or Royal United Hospital in Bath to receive maternity care. Maternity and special care baby services were reinstated at Yeovil Hospital on 21 April 2026.

== Hospitals ==
The trust manages Musgrove Park Hospital, Yeovil Hospital, mental health units in Bridgwater, Taunton and Wells, and 12 community hospitals:

- Bridgwater Community Hospital
- Burnham-on-Sea War Memorial Hospital
- Chard Community Hospital
- Crewkerne Community Hospital
- Frome Community Hospital
- Minehead Community Hospital
- Shepton Mallet Community Hospital
- South Petherton Community Hospital
- Wellington Community Hospital
- West Mendip Community Hospital
- Williton Community Hospital
- Wincanton Community Hospital

== See also ==
- Healthcare in Somerset
- List of NHS trusts
