= Oxford University Hospitals NHS Foundation Trust =

NHS hospital trust

- Type: NHS hospital trust
- Established: 2011
- Budget: £1.45 billion
- Hospitals: John Radcliffe Hospital; Churchill Hospital; Nuffield Orthopaedic Centre; Horton General Hospital; Thame Community Hospital; Wallingford Community Hospital; Wantage Community Hospital; Witney Community Hospital
- Chair: Sir Jonathan Montgomery
- Chief executive: Prof Meghana Pandit
- Staff: 13,500
- Website: Oxford University Hospitals NHS Foundation Trust

Oxford University Hospitals NHS Foundation Trust is an English teaching hospital and part of the Shelford Group. It is one of the UK's largest teaching hospitals and one of the largest hospitals in Europe. The trust is made up of four hospitals – the John Radcliffe Hospital (which includes the Children's Hospital, West Wing, Eye Hospital, Heart Centre and Women's Centre), the Churchill Hospital and the Nuffield Orthopaedic Centre, all located in Oxford, and the Horton General Hospital in Banbury, north Oxfordshire.

As well as the four main hospitals, the trust also provides services in four community hospitals across Oxfordshire including Thame, Wallingford, Wantage and Witney. The services offered at these community hospitals are fairly basic and differ from hospital to hospital. Wantage community hospital is also accompanied by Wantage health centre whereby additional health services are provided by the trust. Other clinics and health centres serviced by the trust in Oxfordshire includes Bicester and Oxford with the trust also providing some services in clinics and hospitals in neighbouring counties.

== History ==
The trust was formed in 2011 by a merger with the Nuffield Orthopaedic Centre NHS Trust. It achieved foundation trust status in October 2015. Sir Jonathan Michael, then chief executive, announced in November 2014 that he planned to retire in 2015 – by which time it was hoped that the trust would achieve foundation trust status.

The trust is to set up an independent business subsidiary in London in partnership with the University of Oxford and Mayo Clinic in 2019.

== Services ==
The trust has one of the 11 Genomics Medicines Centres associated with Genomics England which will open across England in February 2014. All the data produced in the 100,000 Genomes project will be made available to drugs companies and researchers to help them create precision drugs for future generations.

Part of the trust's former Littlemore Hospital site is to be developed for housing.

It is one of the biggest provider of specialised services in England, which generated an income of £356 million in 2014/5.

In 2019 NHS England planned to remove the contract for PET-CT scanning from the trust's Churchill Hospital and award it to a private contractor, InHealth. This was opposed by local MPs, and 10,000 people signed a petition against the move, saying it could produce an inferior service. Through its solicitors the NHS then threatened to sue the trust if it sided with opponents of the plan. The trust then intended to appeal against the decision but backed down after a phone call from NHS England's chairman. NHS England subsequently changed its mind, and agreed that the scanners would stay in the hospital, but InHealth was given the contract to provide the service.

== Performance ==
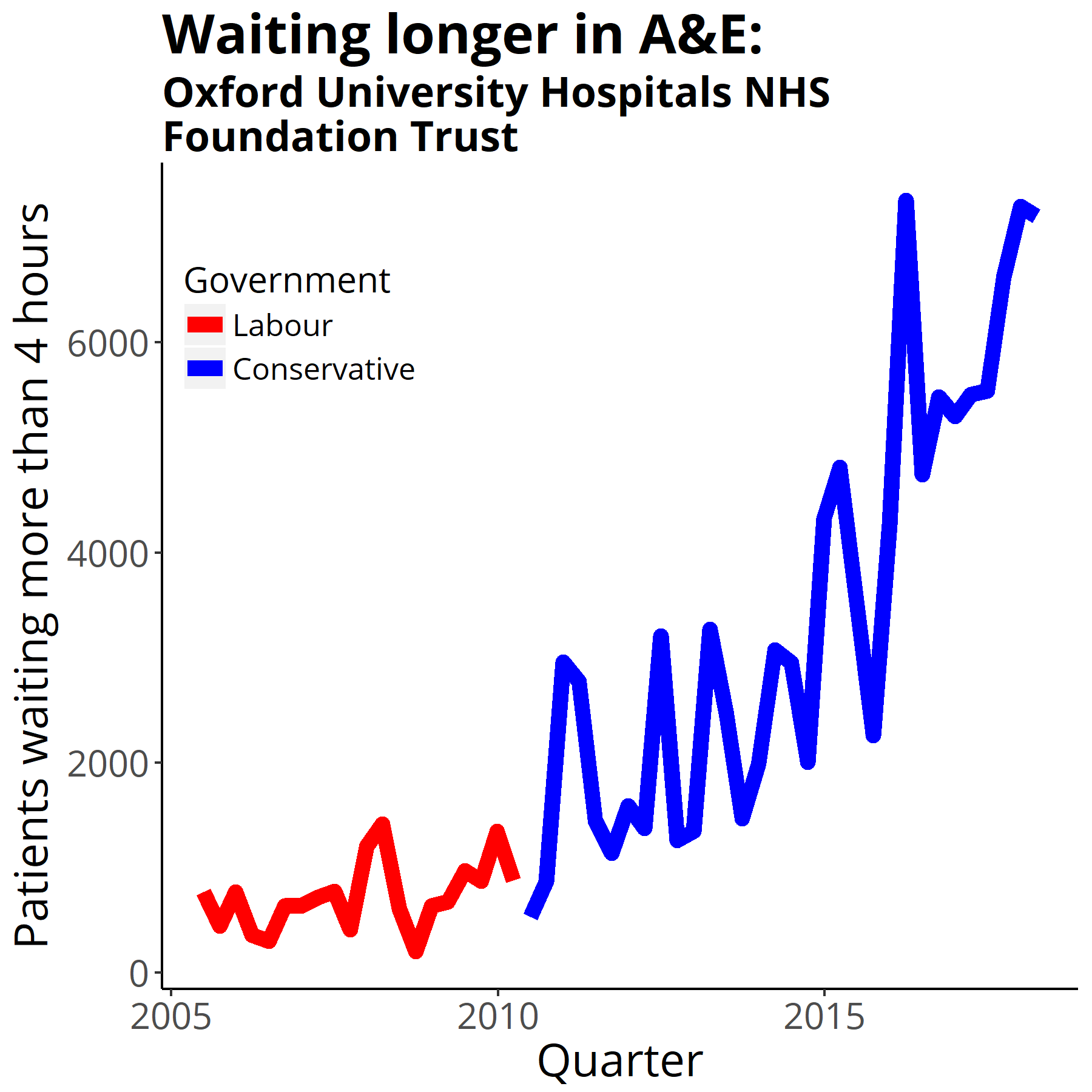
Four-hour target in the emergency department quarterly figures from NHS England Data from https://www.england.nhs.uk/statistics/statistical-work-areas/ae-waiting-times-and-activity/

In September 2016, the trust was selected by NHS England as one of twelve Global Digital Exemplars.

The trust halved the number patients medically fit for discharge but stuck in acute beds between January and June 2016 by employing 60 social care workers to provide support in patients' homes after discharge.

In June 2019 the Care Quality Commission downgraded the trust's rating from "good" to "requires improvement" because "Across John Radcliffe Hospital's wards and in the main theatres the state and repair of the walls, floors, doors and work surfaces were such that adequate cleaning could not always be assured." There were other problems affecting infection control in the operating theatres.

== Staffing ==
In September 2018 the chief executive, Bruno Holthof, reported that the trust had about 450 nursing vacancies, because of the effect of Brexit and the high cost of living in the area, and had to close beds as a result. There were 3,210 nurses and health visitors employed in June 2018.

== See also ==
- Oxford Health NHS Foundation Trust
- List of NHS trusts
