= South Tyneside and Sunderland NHS Foundation Trust =

NHS hospital trust

The South Tyneside and Sunderland NHS Foundation Trust is a National Health Service trust formed from the merger of City Hospitals Sunderland NHS Foundation Trust and South Tyneside NHS Foundation Trust in April 2019.

Its facilities include South Tyneside District Hospital, Sunderland Royal Hospital and Sunderland Eye Infirmary.
