= Yeovil District Hospital NHS Foundation Trust =

NHS hospital trust

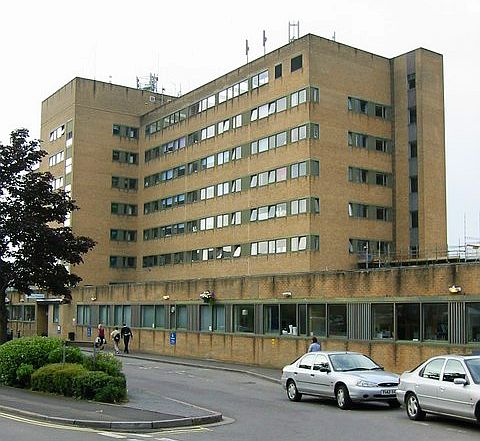
- Yeovil Hospital formerly managed by Yeovil District Hospital NHS Foundation Trust
- Former name: East Somerset NHS Trust
- Type: NHS foundation trust
- Established: 1 June 2006
- Disbanded: 1 April 2023
- Hospitals: Yeovil Hospital
- Chair: Paul von der Heyde
- Chief executive: Jonathan Higman

Yeovil District Hospital NHS Foundation Trust was a NHS trust that previously ran Yeovil Hospital in Yeovil, Somerset, England. The trust merged with Somerset NHS Foundation Trust in April 2023.

== History ==
On 1 April 1991, East Somerset NHS Trust was formed managing Yeovil District Hospital and services in the wider community. South Somerset Primary Care Trust took over running community services from 1 April 2002.

Then on 1 June 2006, East Somerset NHS Trust became a foundation trust renaming to Yeovil District Hospital NHS Foundation Trust to reflect the fact that it solely managed Yeovil District Hospital.

== Performance ==
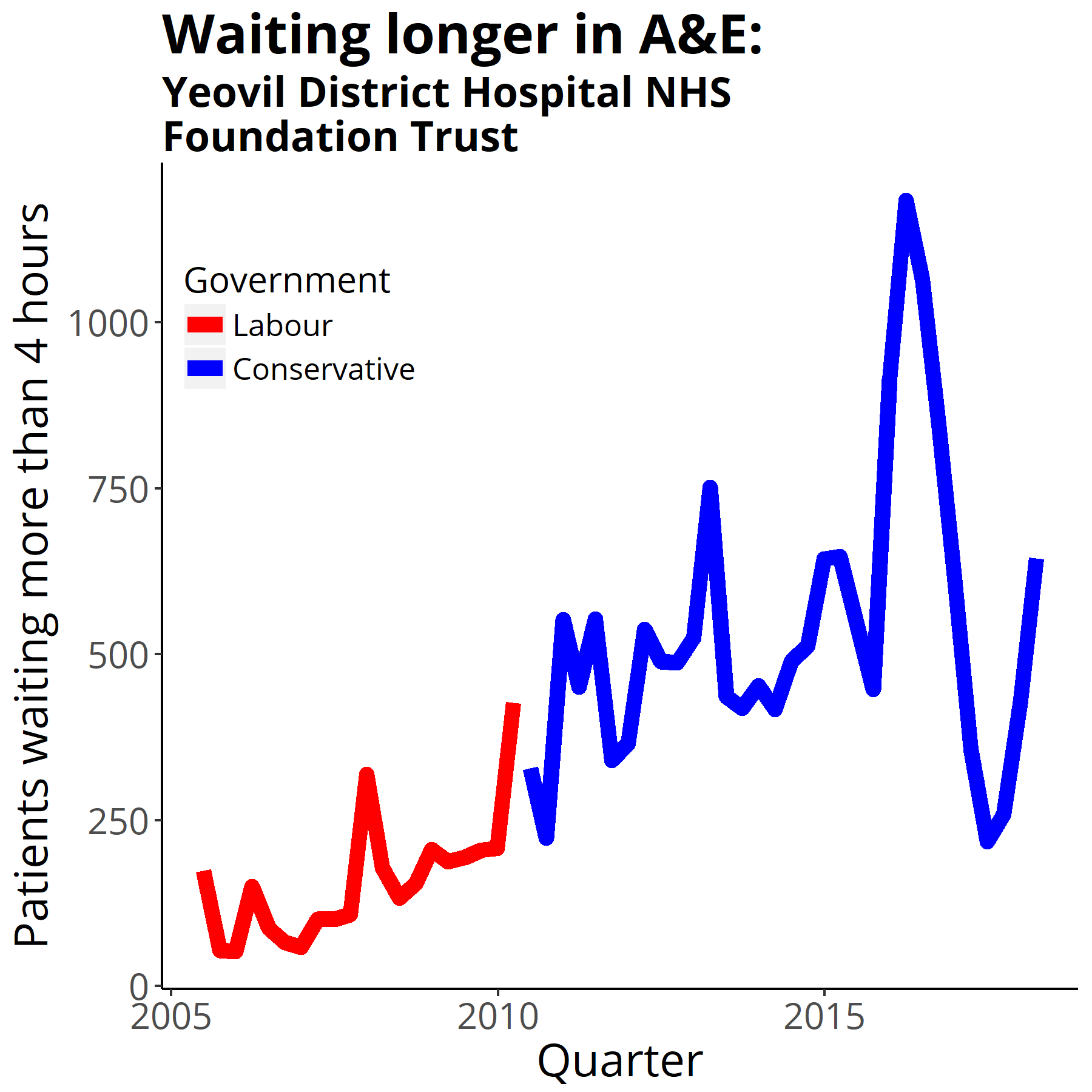
Four-hour target in the emergency department quarterly figures from NHS England Data from https://www.england.nhs.uk/statistics/statistical-work-areas/ae-waiting-times-and-activity/

== Developments ==
The trust set up a joint venture, Southwest Pathology Services, with Taunton and Somerset NHS Foundation Trust and Integrated Pathology Partnerships in 2012. All routine pathology, apart from histopathology, is now performed at a separate site which also handles GP tests. Essential service laboratories are established in the hospitals for urgent tests. Turnround times for both GP and hospital tests has improved and costs have been reduced.

In December 2014, the trust established a 15-year strategic estate partnership to fund and manage a new health campus with construction companies Interserve and Prime. The £70 million deal will enable the trust to expand the number of beds for patients with dementia, create a GP practice, a nursing home and a retail pharmacy and to relocate its day surgery service onto the campus.

It started a 12-month trial with the Babylon Health app for staff of the trust in December 2016.

=== South Somerset Symphony programme ===
It set up a subsidiary company called Symphony Healthcare Services in 2016, which took over the running of three small GP practices with a combined registered list of 12,500 in March 2016. Symphony is also forming a partnership with South Somerset Primary Healthcare which will become an accountable care organisation managing an outcomes based budget for the 120,000 population of South Somerset. The programme was reported to have reduced emergency hospital admissions by 30% by focusing intensive support on the 4% of patients with most complex needs. It took over Highbridge Medical Centre, in Highbridge in April 2017. It plans to take on eight more GP practices covering a population of around 61,000 during 2018.

In 2017, the trust established a subsidiary company, Simply Serve, to which 360 estates and facilities staff were transferred. The intention was to achieve VAT benefits, as well as pay bill savings, by recruiting new staff on less expensive non-NHS contracts. VAT benefits arise because NHS trusts can only claim VAT back on a small subset of goods and services they buy. The Value Added Tax Act 1994 provides a mechanism through which NHS trusts can qualify for refunds on contracted out services.

== Merger ==
In November 2020 it was reported that the Trust was planning a merger with Somerset NHS Foundation Trust, which would create England’s first provider of primary, acute, community and mental health care services. The merger took place on 1 April 2023.

== See also ==
- Healthcare in Somerset
- List of hospitals in England
- List of NHS trusts
