= The Food Foundation =

UK food policy charity and think tank

- Founded: 2015
- Founder: Laura Sandys
- Type: Charitable incorporated organisation
- Registration no.: 1187611
- Headquarters: London
- Key people: Anna Taylor (executive director)
- Publication: The Broken Plate; Food Insecurity Tracker; State of the Nation's Food Industry

The Food Foundation is a charity and think tank in the United Kingdom that researches and campaigns on food policy. It was founded by the former Conservative MP Laura Sandys in 2015 and is based in London. Its research is regularly reported in the UK national press and has drawn public responses from the government.

Its main publications are The Broken Plate, an annual report on the affordability and availability of healthy food, and the Food Insecurity Tracker, a regular national survey of household food insecurity. A third annual report, State of the Nation's Food Industry, ranks major food businesses. The foundation leads the Peas Please initiative to increase vegetable consumption, was a member of Marcus Rashford's child food poverty task force, and led a coalition calling for free school meals in England to be extended to all households receiving Universal Credit.

== History ==
Sandys announced plans for the foundation in 2014, while still an MP, describing it as an independent body that would do for the food system what The King's Fund does for health and social care. Its first trustees included Caroline Spelman, Charles Godfray and Rosie Boycott. The foundation began work in 2015, and by 2016 had three full-time staff led by Anna Taylor, its first executive director. Its first report, Force Fed (2016), stated that the food system made unhealthy food cheaper and easier to buy than healthy food.

== Mission ==
The foundation's stated mission is to change food policy and business practices so that everyone in the UK can afford a healthy diet. Rather than relying on healthy eating messages aimed at consumers, it seeks change through influencing government policy and business practice, such as pricing, promotions, advertising and supply chains. Among its proposals is a Good Food Bill with legally binding targets for the food system.

== Activities ==
=== Research ===
Since 2020 the foundation has commissioned regular surveys for its Food Insecurity Tracker, and the figures have been used in national reporting on hunger during the cost of living crisis. Successive editions of The Broken Plate have compared the cost of healthier and less healthy food, and estimated the share of income poorer households would need to spend to follow the government's recommended diet. The chair of the Food Standards Agency and the government's food minister both responded publicly to the 2025 edition. Separate reports have examined whether low-income households can afford the government's Eatwell Guide diet and the UK's reliance on fruit and vegetable imports from countries vulnerable to climate change.

=== Food industry ===
The State of the Nation's Food Industry report examines how food businesses shape diets through their products, menus, promotions and advertising. Drawing on its findings, the foundation has called for all large food businesses to be required to report the healthiness of their sales. Peas Please, launched in 2016, works with retailers, caterers and manufacturers to increase the amount of vegetables they sell and serve.

=== Children's food ===
In 2020 the foundation joined the child food poverty task force formed by Marcus Rashford. It led a coalition calling for free school meals in England to be extended to all children in households receiving Universal Credit. In June 2025 the government announced that the extension would take effect from the 2026/27 school year.
