= The Practice PLC =

The Practice PLC is one of the largest providers of Primary Care in the English NHS.

The Practice was established in 2004 - then called Practice Networks - by Dr Jeremy Rose and Dr Ajit Kadirgamar in Amersham. It now runs over 50 GP surgeries and GP-led Health Centres. In February 2014 it had the biggest list of about 174,000 registered patients of any provider in England.

In February 2012 the company closed down the Camden Road Surgery – a long-standing GP practice previously taken over by US health company UnitedHealth in 2008 - less than a year after taking over the contract because the surgery's landlord refused an extension for the premises lease beyond April 2012. Camden Road was one of six practices taken over from UnitedHealth when the American firm decided to refocus its UK business to concentrate solely on commissioning support, and exploit the opportunities presented by the Government's NHS reforms.

In February 2018 its practices had a registered population of more than 200,000. Since 2016 it has been majority owned by the Centene Corporation. In 2016 it set up TPG Complex Care, which is focused on care at home for patients with complex needs. In March 2016 it had 517 staff - 188 clinical and 331 in administration. It ran five surgeries in Brighton but gave them up in 2016.
