= Paul Nurse =

English geneticist and Nobel laureate (born 1949)

Sir Paul Nurse OM CH PRS FMedSci HonFREng HonFBA MAE
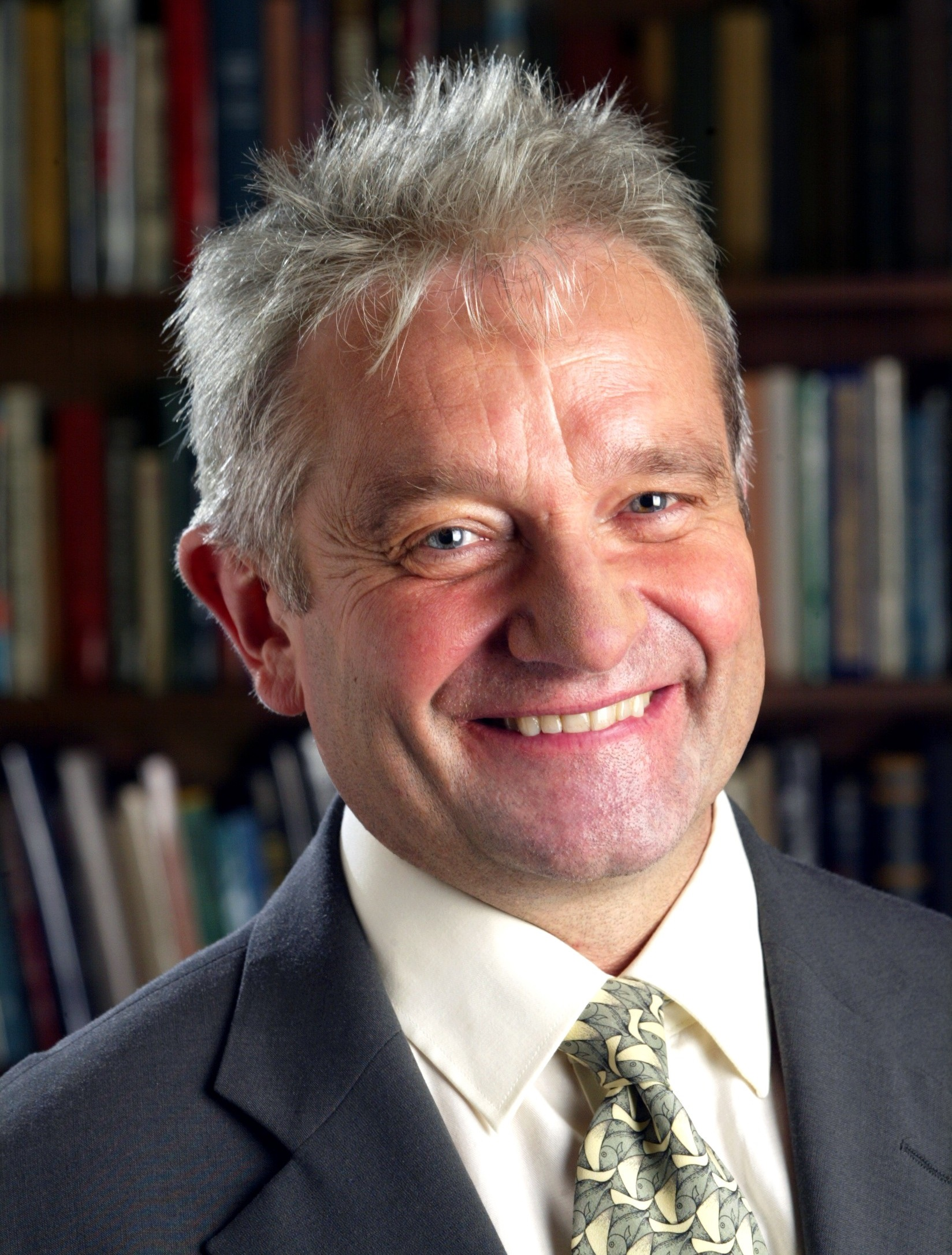

61st and 64th President of the Royal Society
- Incumbent
- Assumed office 1 December 2025
- Preceded by: Adrian Smith
- In office 1 December 2010 – 1 December 2015
- Preceded by: The Lord Rees of Ludlow
- Succeeded by: Venkatraman Ramakrishnan

Chancellor of the University of Bristol
- Incumbent
- Assumed office 2017
- President: Hugh Brady; Evelyn Welch
- Preceded by: The Baroness Hale of Richmond

9th President of Rockefeller University
- In office 2003–2011
- Preceded by: Arnold Levine
- Succeeded by: Marc Tessier-Lavigne

Personal details
- Born: Paul Maxime Nurse; 25 January 1949 (age 77) Norwich, Norfolk, England
- Spouse: Anne Teresa Talbott (m. 1971)
- Children: 2 daughters
- Education: University of Birmingham (BSc); University of East Anglia (PhD)
- Website: Francis Crick Institute - Paul Nurse
- Scientific career
- Awards: Rosenstiel Award (1992); Louis-Jeantet Prize for Medicine (1992); Royal Medal (1995); Lasker Award (1998); Nobel Prize in Physiology or Medicine (2001); Copley Medal (2005); Albert Einstein World Award of Science (2013)
- Fields: Genetics; Cell biology; Cell cycle
- Workplaces: Royal Society; Francis Crick Institute; Rockefeller University; University of Bristol; University of Edinburgh; University of Oxford; Linacre College; Imperial Cancer Research Fund; Cancer Research UK; University of Sussex
- Thesis: The spatial and temporal organisation of amino acid pools in Candida utilis (1974)
- Doctoral advisor: Anthony P. Sims
- Doctoral students: Alison Woollard

Sir Paul Maxime Nurse (born 25 January 1949) is an English geneticist, President of the Royal Society and former Chief Executive and Director of the Francis Crick Institute. He was awarded the 2001 Nobel Prize in Physiology or Medicine, along with Leland Hartwell and Tim Hunt, for their discoveries of protein molecules that control the division of cells in the cell cycle.

== Early life and education ==
Nurse's mother went from London to Norwich and lived with relatives while awaiting Paul's birth (at the age of 18) in order to hide illegitimacy. For the rest of their lives, his maternal grandmother pretended to be his mother, and his mother pretended to be his sister.

Paul was brought up by his grandparents (whom he took to be his parents) in North West London. He was educated at Lyon Park school in Alperton and Harrow County Grammar School. He received his BSc degree in Biology in 1970 from the University of Birmingham and his PhD degree in 1973 from the University of East Anglia for research on Candida utilis. He then pursued postdoctoral work at the University of Bern, the University of Edinburgh and the University of Sussex.

Nurse did not know that his "sister" was in fact his mother until he was in his 50s. His "parents" had both already died and his "sister" Miriam, eighteen years his senior, had died early of multiple sclerosis. His application for a green card for US residency while president of Rockefeller University was, to his surprise, rejected, despite him being a Nobel Prize winner, president of a university and a knight; this was because he had submitted a short-form UK birth certificate which did not name his parents. When he applied for a full birth certificate he discovered the truth, to his astonishment. Professor Turi King traced his father for him in 2023.

== Career and research ==
Following his PhD studies, Nurse continued his postdoctoral research at the laboratory of Murdoch Mitchison at the University of Edinburgh for the next six years (1973–1979).

Beginning in 1976, Nurse identified the gene cdc2 in fission yeast (Schizosaccharomyces pombe). This gene controls the progression of the cell cycle from G1 phase to S phase, when the cell grows in preparation for the duplication of DNA, and the transition from G2 phase to mitosis (M), when the cell divides. In 1987, with his postdoctoral researcher Melanie Lee, Nurse identified the homologous gene in human, Cdk1. These genes activate and inactivate cyclin dependent kinase (CDK) by causing phosphate groups to be added or removed.

In 1984, Nurse joined the Imperial Cancer Research Fund (ICRF, now Cancer Research UK). He left in 1988 to chair the department of microbiology at the University of Oxford. He then returned to the ICRF as Director of Research in 1993, and in 1996, was named Director General of the ICRF, which became Cancer Research UK in 2002. In 2003, he became president of Rockefeller University in New York City where he continued work on the cell cycle of fission yeast. In 2011 Nurse became the first Director and Chief Executive of the UK Centre for Medical Research and Innovation, now the Francis Crick Institute.

On 30 November 2010, Nurse succeeded astrophysicist Martin Rees for a five-year term as President of the Royal Society until 2015.

Nurse has said good scientists must have passion "to know the answer to the questions" that interest them, along with good technical ability, and a set of attitudes including intellectual honesty, self-criticism, open-mindedness and scepticism.

== Awards and honours ==
In addition to the Nobel Prize, Nurse has received numerous awards and honours. He was elected an EMBO Member in 1987 and a Fellow of the Royal Society (FRS) in 1989 and a Founder Member of the Academy of Medical Sciences in 1998. In 1995, he was awarded the Pezcoller-AACR International Award. he received a Royal Medal and became a foreign associate of the U.S. National Academy of Sciences. He received the Albert Lasker Award for Basic Medical Research in 1998. Nurse was knighted in 1999. He was awarded the French Legion d'Honneur and the Golden Plate Award of the American Academy of Achievement in 2002. He was also awarded the Copley Medal in 2005. He was elected a Foreign Honorary Member of the American Academy of Arts and Sciences – one of the top honours – in April 2006. He is a member of the Advisory Council for the Campaign for Science and Engineering. Nurse is the 2007 recipient of the Hope Funds Award of Excellence in Basic Research. He is a Freeman of the London Borough of Harrow. In 2013, he was awarded the Albert Einstein World Award of Science by the World Cultural Council. In 2015, he was elected a foreign academician of the Chinese Academy of Sciences, and won the 10th annual Henry G. Friesen International Prize in Health Research, in Ottawa, Canada. He was appointed Member of the Order of the Companions of Honour (CH) in the 2022 New Year Honours for services to science and medicine in the UK and abroad. In November 2022, he was appointed to the Order of Merit.

Nurse has received more than sixty honorary degrees and fellowships, including from the University of Bath in 2002, the University of Oxford in 2003, the University of Cambridge in 2003, the University of Kent in 2012, the University of Warwick (Doctor of Science) the University of Worcester (Doctor of Science) in 2013, City, University of London (Doctor of Science) in 2014, McGill University (Doctor of Science) in 2017, and the University of Hong Kong (Doctor of Science) in 2021. In 2020, he was awarded an honorary degree from the Mendel University in Brno in the Czech Republic.

He was also appointed an Honorary Fellow of the Royal Academy of Engineering (HonFREng) in 2012 and Honorary Fellow of the British Association (HonFBA) in 2013. In July 2016, it was announced that he would become the next Chancellor of the University of Bristol. He is an Honorary Liveryman of the Worshipful Company of Scientific Instrument Makers. On 23 November 2024, he was elected the 169th President of The Birmingham & Midland Institute by its members. In 2023, Nurse was awarded the Dalton Medal of the Manchester Literary and Philosophical Society.

== Personal life ==
Nurse married Anne Teresa (née Talbott) in 1971; they have two daughters – Sarah, who works for ITV, and Emily, a physicist based at University College London and CERN. He describes himself as a sceptical agnostic.

=== Political views ===
Nurse has been a member of the Labour Party for nearly 40 years and is a patron of Scientists for Labour, a socialist society affiliated to them. In September 2020, he was a co-author on a letter in Nature alongside the former prime minister Gordon Brown highlighting the importance of EU funding in the fight against COVID-19.

As an undergraduate student at Birmingham, Nurse sold Socialist Worker, and participated in an occupation of the vice-chancellor's office. As a graduate student at East Anglia, he continued to sell Socialist Worker, and was sympathetic to the International Socialist Tendency but never formally joined the movement.

Nurse has criticised potential Republican Party candidates for the US presidential nomination for opposing the teaching of natural selection, stem cell research on cell lines from human embryos, and anthropogenic climate change, even partially blaming scientists for not speaking up. He was alarmed that this could happen in the US, a world leader in science, "the home of Benjamin Franklin, Richard Feynman and Jim Watson".

One problem, Nurse said, was "treating scientific discussion as if it were political debate", using rhetorical tricks rather than logic. Another was the state of science teaching in the schools, which does not teach citizens how to discuss science – particularly in religious schools, even in the United Kingdom. Nurse has written that "we need to emphasise why the scientific process is such a reliable generator of knowledge with its respect for evidence, for scepticism, for consistency of approach, for the constant testing of ideas." Furthermore, Nurse feels that scientific leaders "have a responsibility to expose the bunkum". They should take on politicians, and expose nonsense during elections.

In August 2014, Nurse was one of 200 public figures who were signatories to a letter to The Guardian expressing their hope that Scotland would vote to remain part of the United Kingdom in September's referendum on that issue.

Nurse believes that scientists should speak out about science in public affairs and challenge politicians who support policies based on pseudoscience.

As the President of the Royal Society, Nurse defended Elon Musk's membership of that society.

== Books ==
- What Is Life?: Understand Biology In Five Steps (2020), David Fickling Books
- What Is Life?: Five Great Ideas in Biology (2021), W. W. Norton & Company

== See also ==
- List of presidents of the Royal Society

Professional and academic associations
Preceded by Martin Rees	61st President of the Royal Society; 2010–2015	Succeeded by Venkatraman Ramakrishnan
Preceded by Adrian Smith (statistician)	64th President of the Royal Society; 2025–present	Incumbent
Academic offices
Preceded by Arnold Levine	9th President of Rockefeller University; 2003–2011	Succeeded by Marc Tessier-Lavigne
Preceded by The Baroness Hale of Richmond	Chancellor of the University of Bristol; 2017–present	Incumbent
