= InHealth Group =

British health technology company

InHealth Group is a health technology company founded in 2004, based in High Wycombe, operating over more than 300 sites across the United Kingdom.

Geoff Searle was appointed chief executive officer in 2019 and former CEO Richard Bradford became chair.

Revenue in 2016-7 was £109.8 million and operating profit was £2.9 million.

== Subsidiaries ==
Subsidiaries of InHealth Group include:

- Molecular Imaging Solutions Ltd,
- Euroclinics UK Ltd,
- Preventicum UK Ltd,
- e-Locum Services Ltd,
- Vista Diagnostics Ltd,
- Prima Diagnostics.

It is a member of the NHS Partners Network and most of its work is for the NHS though it also provides services commercially. It is one of the leading providers of voice prosthesis devices. It provides a wide range of diagnostics and imaging services to the NHS and private hospitals and clinics. It has contracts with many Clinical Commissioning Groups for direct access diagnostics following GP referral. It has a mobile fleet of more than 55 fully mobile diagnostic scanners which can be used for short-term contracts. It runs five walk-in centres for patients in London. It operates a fleet of 184 vehicles from Lex Autolease.

== Scanning ==
It provides a fully managed MRI service for patients at Kingston Hospital with a 15-year contract worth £35 million.

It runs a scanning service for the British Boxing Board of Control.

In March 2019 it won a contract for PET-CT scanning in Oxford in a tendering exercise conducted by NHS England. The service was previously provided by Churchill Hospital. Governors of Oxford University Hospitals NHS Foundation Trust, local clinicians and campaigners complained that this was inappropriate privatisation, that the company did not have specialist radiographers, and that cancer services at the hospital would be disrupted. The Trust will have to surrender the leases on its two scanners, which will be relocated. Patients may need to be taken to the new locations by ambulance.

It invested £7 million in Healios, an online therapy platform for children and young people with mental health conditions in 2021.
