= LifeArc =

British medical research charity

- Type: Charity Commission for England and Wales
- Industry: Life science medical research charity
- Founded: 2000
- Fate: Renamed LifeArc in 2017
- Headquarters: London, UK
- Number of locations: London, Stevenage, Edinburgh
- Key people: Dr Ian Gilham (Chairman; Dr Sam Barrell (CEO)
- Services: IP management, drug discovery, diagnostics development, antibody engineering, charity portfolio review
- Revenue: £205 million (2024)
- Number of employees: 360
- Website: lifearc.org

LifeArc is a British self-funded medical research organisation, with a focus on rare diseases and drug-resistant infections or antimicrobial resistance. It is both a limited company by guarantee and a registered charity.

The organisation is known for its expertise in research translation and bring medical innovations closer to patient impact. This includes humanising the antibody that would become the immunotherapy cancer drug, Keytruda (pembrolizumab), as well as 4 other licensed medicines.

In 2019, the sale of a portion of royalties in Keytruda helped to build a strategic investment portfolio and gave LifeArc financial independence. LifeArc's income derives from several sources, including royalties, commercialisation of scientific platforms, a ventures portfolio and investment portfolio.

== History ==
The organisation’s work began in 1984 as a single-site science park with a focus on antibody development. In 1999 it became the commercialisation division of the Medical Research Council (MRC), Medical Research Council Technology (MCR-T). As MRC-T, the organisation helped to translate research funded by the MRC and other life sciences organisations, with a combination of scientific expertise and commercial advice.

The organisation officially rebranded as LifeArc in 2017.

Throughout its history, LifeArc has used its expertise in translational research to help translate scientific discoveries into innovations for patients. This includes licensed medicines, Keytruda (pembrolizumab) (Merck/MSD): immunotherapy for various cancers, Leqembi (lecanemab) (Easai / BioArctic): for Alzheimer’s disease, Actemra (tocilizumab) (Hoffmann-La Roche/Chugai): for rheumatoid arthritis and other conditions, Tysabri (natalizumab) (Biogen Idec/Elan): for multiple sclerosis and Entyvio (vedolizumab) (Millenium Pharma/Takeda): for ulcerative colitis and Crohn's disease. Keytruda is one of the best selling drugs in history, generating $31.7 billion in sales in 2025.

In May 2019, LifeArc announced it had sold part of its royalty rights for Keytruda to a subsidiary of Canada Pension Plan Investment Board (CPPIB) for US$1.297 billion (approximately £1 billion).

This capital helped to build a strategic investment portfolio, returns from which are reinvested to ensure continued support of high impact science and cement LifeArc’s status as ‘self-funded’. In 2021, LifeArc launched a new research strategy, “Making life science life changing”, to translate basic science into new ideas and opportunities for patients. Across 2025, LifeArc refined its strategy to focus on rare diseases and drug-resistant infections. It also expanded its portfolio to include clinical research.

== Operations ==
=== Management ===
LifeArc is led by chief executive officer (CEO) Dr Sam Barrell, CBE and a board of trustees. The board is chaired by Dr Ian Gilham and includes Lynne Robb (vice chair), Dr Sam Barrell (CEO), Stéphane Maikovsky (deputy CEO and chief financial officer), Dr Terri Cooper, Dr Sameer Mistry, Daniel Morgan, Ian Nicholson, Jo Pisani, Susan Wallcraft and David Zahn. Barrell became CEO in October 2024. Melanie Lee served as CEO between 2018 and 2023. Stéphane Maikovsky served as interim CEO after Lee’s departure and before Barrell’s appointment.

=== Research and funding ===
Much of LifeArc’s research is focused on healthcare areas where patient needs are urgent and progress is slow, but the science ready for translation. Within rare disease, this includes childhood cancer, chronic and rare respiratory diseases, motor neuron disease and rare dementias. It also has a focus on drug-resistant infections within the context of global health.

LifeArc’s research funding spans multiple funding schemes, to recipients across the UK and globally, often as part of co-funding agreements. Its funding model is one of “value add”, combining financial support with strategic partnership and input from in-house experts, including in drug discovery and development, clinical trial support, data science and commercialisation.

The LifeArc Translational Centres for Rare Disease are a £40 million investment to establish 4 specialised research hubs to accelerate the development of new tests, treatments and potentially cures for people living with rare medical conditions.

It's Primer Fund supports the development of tools and tests that could be used in the primary care setting to accelerate diagnosis for people with motor neuron disease (MND). Its Rare Disease Clinical Trials Programme funds clinical programmes to accelerate the development of drugs, devices and diagnostics for people with rare disease.

LifeArc co-founded PACE (Pathways to Antimicrobial Clinical Efficiency) in partnership with Innovate UK and Medicines Discovery Catapult, providing funding and wraparound support for projects tackling drug-resistant bacterial infections.

Over the last three decades, the organisation has built scientific platforms and capabilities to support partners to advance their research. This research includes antibody humanisation, which helps partners to humanise monoclonal antibodies from a wide range of species. This platform has led to 5 approved therapies, including Keytruda (pembrolizumab). It also works in antibody discovery, using its proprietary B-SMArT™ platform and clinically validated transgenic Kymouse platform to generate fully human therapeutic antibodies.

LifeArc platforms also include clinical trial support, data science, induced pluripotent stem cell technology and microbiology, as well as expertise in intellectual property identification, protection and commercialisation and technology transfer. With these capabilities, the organisation supports its partners to progress their research through the translational pipeline.

=== Partnerships ===
LifeArc forms strategic partnerships with organisations around the world to drive progress in rare disease and drug-resistant infection research. LifeArc is a founding member of the Fleming Initiative, a global collaborative effort addressing unmet and emerging needs in antimicrobial resistance.

In 2022, LifeArc committed £30 million to a 5-year partnership with the UK Dementia Research Institute (DRI) to tackle neurodegenerative diseases. The partnership also provides UK DRI scientists with access to LifeArc’s scientific platforms and capabilities. It is part of the Cystic Fibrosis Antimicrobial Resistance Syndicate, a cross-sector initiative between Cystic Fibrosis Trust, Medicines Discovery Catapult and LifeArc, accelerating the translation of novel antimicrobial drugs and diagnostics for people with cystic fibrosis.

LifeArc partnered with Cancer Research Horizons and later Great Ormond Street Hospital Charity to form C-Further, a £37 million initiative that aims to advance the development of new targeted treatments for children and young people with cancer.

=== Locations ===
As of 2026, LifeArc headquarters are based in Tavistock Square, London, with offices in Edinburgh, scientific research facilities in Stevenage and a specialist science team at the Francis Crick Institute.

In 2025, LifeArc announced it will move its London-and Stevenage-based teams to 105 Judd Street, previously home to the Salvation Army and the Royal National Institute of the Blind, in London’s Knowledge Quarter. The refurbished building will include purpose-designed office and laboratory space for science, operations and partnerships.

== LifeArc Ventures ==
LifeArc Ventures is the organisation's venture investment arm. It invests in science-led companies that are developing promising health-related innovations, aiming to grow their value and generate cash returns that can be reinvested into charitable activities. The portfolio comprises innovative, impact-oriented life science companies across the full spectrum of therapeutics, HealthTech and medical devices.

In addition to seed, series A, series B and follow-on investment, LifeArc Ventures companies can access LifeArc’s scientific platforms, strategic advice and industry connections to advance their science through to commercial success.
