= Sunderland Eye Infirmary =

- South Tyneside and Sunderland NHS Foundation Trust
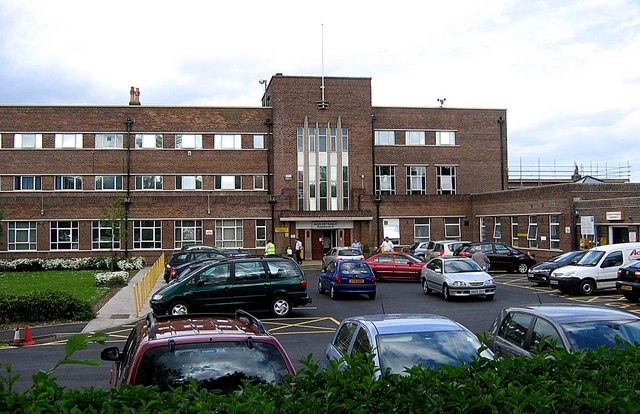
- Sunderland Eye Infirmary

- Shown in Tyne and Wear

Geography
- Location: Sunderland, Tyne and Wear, England, United Kingdom
- Coordinates: 54.8892°N 1.3812°W

Organisation
- Care system: Public NHS
- Type: Eye Hospital

Services
- Emergency department: Yes Accident & Emergency

History
- Founded: 1836

Links
- Lists: Hospitals in England

The Sunderland Eye Infirmary is a health facility in Sunderland, Tyne and Wear. It is managed by the South Tyneside and Sunderland NHS Foundation Trust.

== History ==
The facility has its origins in the Sunderland and North Durham Eye Infirmary established on High Street East in 1836. It subsequently moved to Crowtree Terrace and then relocated to Stockton Road in 1893. It became the Sunderland and Durham County Eye Infirmary in 1903 and the Durham County and Sunderland Eye Infirmary in 1911. The current facility, which was financed by a gift from Sir John Priestman, a shipbuilder, was opened by Princess Elizabeth as the Sir John Priestman Durham County and Sunderland Eye Infirmary shortly after the Second World War. It joined the National Health Service in 1948.

In March 2021, plans were unveiled for a new £36 million Eye Hospital. The trust had planned to begin construction in Spring 2022, with a projected opening date in 2024. Construction on the site started in November 2023, with a revised opening date of Summer 2026.

On 19 June 2026, a phased opening for the new hospital was announced. The eye emergency department would relocate to the new site at 2pm on 11 July, followed by all other services on 23 July.
