= South Tyneside District Hospital =

NHS hospital

- South Tyneside and Sunderland NHS Foundation Trust
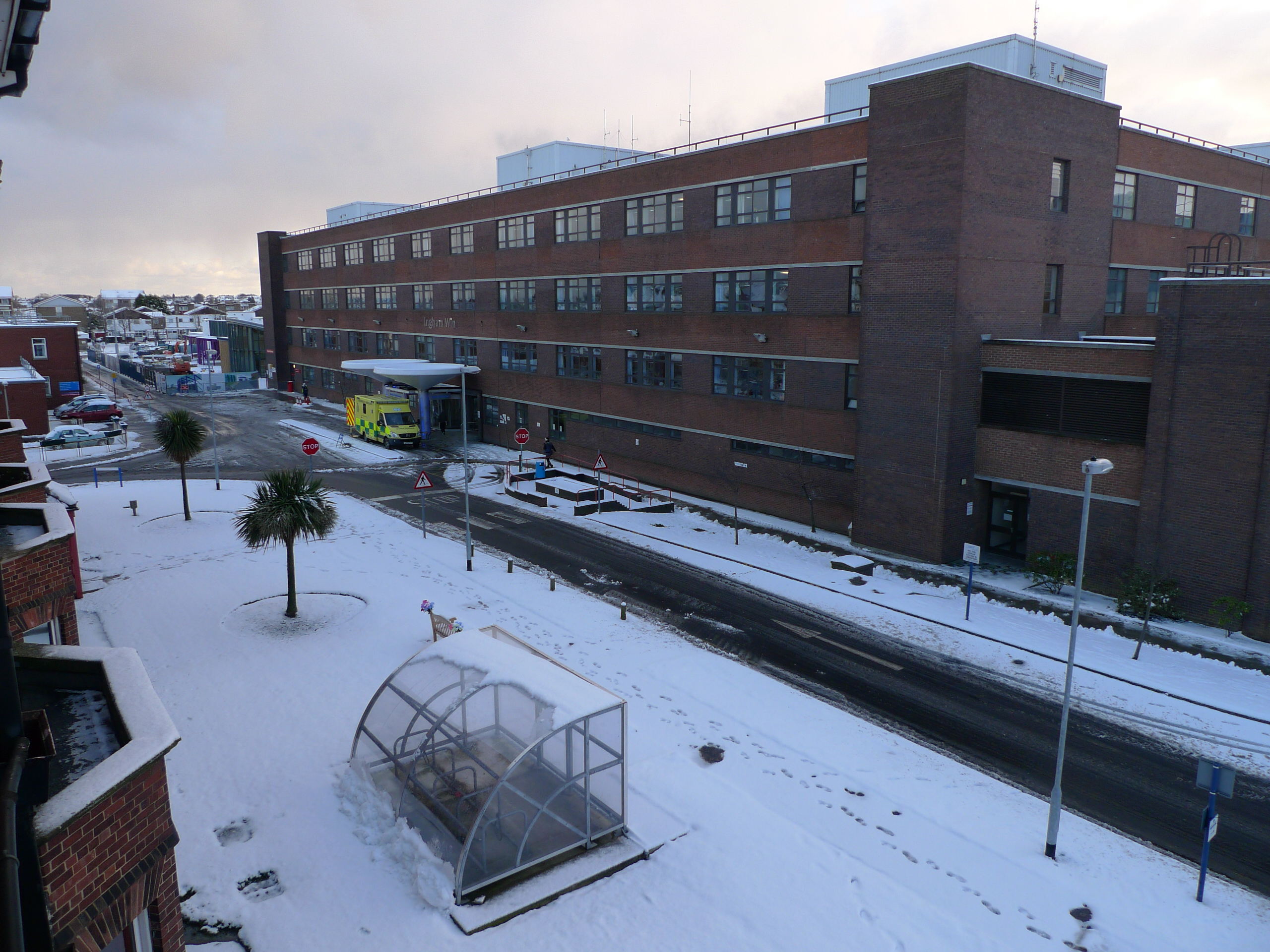
- The Ingham Wing, South Tyneside District Hospital

- Shown in Tyne and Wear

Geography
- Location: South Shields, South Tyneside, Tyne and Wear, England, United Kingdom
- Coordinates: 54°58′16.2″N 1°25′39.6″W

Organisation
- Care system: Public NHS
- Type: District General

Services
- Emergency department: Yes Accident & Emergency
- Beds: 394

History
- Founded: 1880

Links
- Website: www.stft.nhs.uk
- Lists: Hospitals in England

South Tyneside District Hospital is a healthcare facility providing healthcare services for South Shields, Jarrow, Hebburn, Boldon, Cleadon and Whitburn. It is managed by South Tyneside and Sunderland NHS Foundation Trust.

== History ==
The hospital has its origins in an infirmary which was built for the South Shields Poor Law Union and which opened in 1880. J. H. Morton architects designed a new boiler house and chimney in 1903. The infirmary became known as the Harton P.L. Institution and General Hospital by 1930. It became the South Shields General Hospital after joining the National Health Service in 1948.

The new Ingham Wing was built and urgent care services were transferred from the Ingham Infirmary at Westoe in April 1993, the enlarged facilities becoming known as South Tyneside District Hospital.

Since then, most of the original Victorian buildings have been demolished, with the exception of some service buildings, plus the former main entrance and its eastern wings, now known as the Harton Wing, which formerly served as the headquarters of South Tyneside NHS Foundation Trust, and now serves as offices for South Tyneside and Sunderland NHS Foundation Trust.

The Trust won a contract from South Tyneside Council to develop an integrated care services hub, to be built as a standalone facility on the hospital site in August 2014.

== Services ==
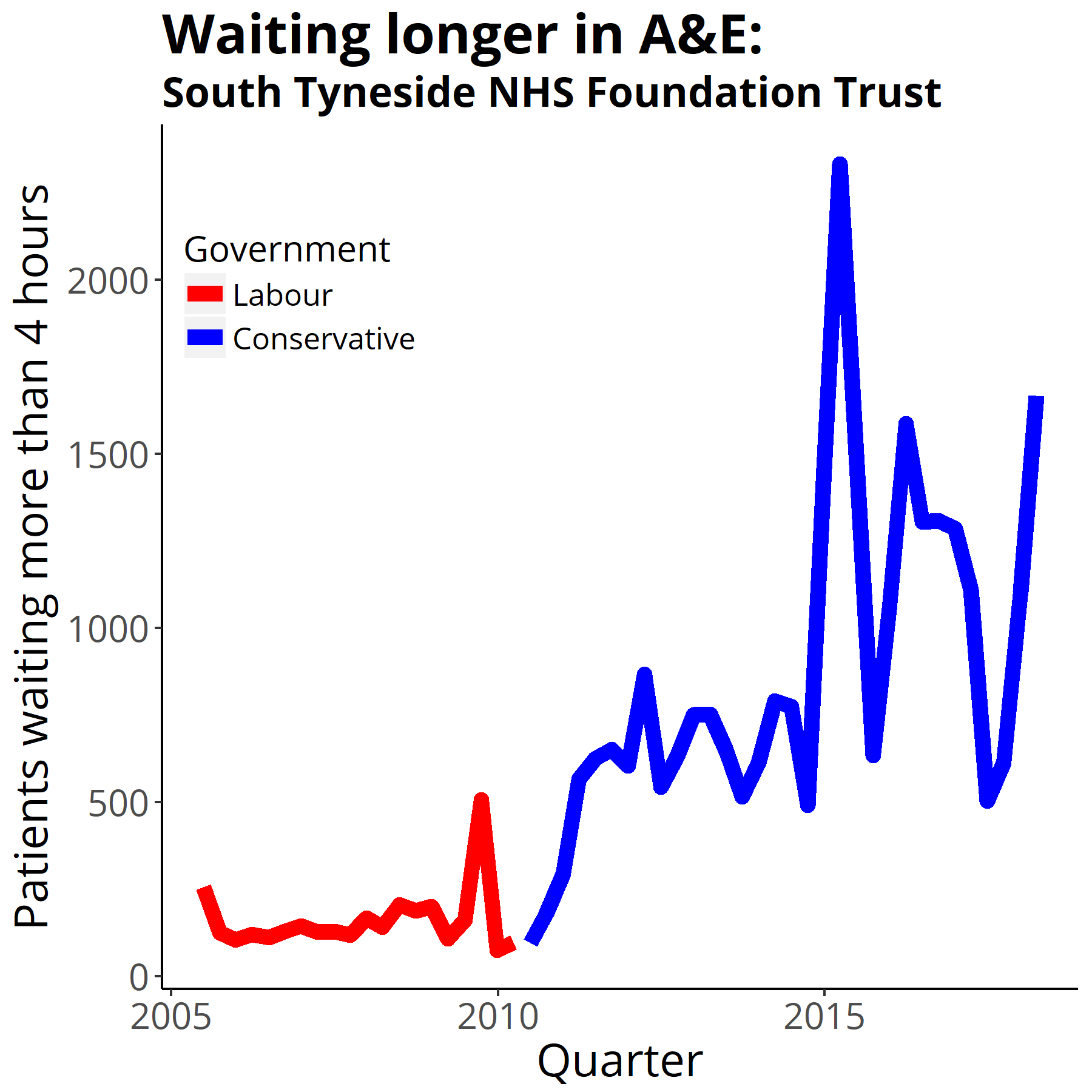
Four-hour target in the emergency department quarterly figures from NHS England Data from https://www.england.nhs.uk/statistics/statistical-work-areas/ae-waiting-times-and-activity/

Sunderland and South Tyneside clinical commissioning groups decided in February 2018 to centralise hospital based stroke, maternity, gynaecology and paediatric services at Sunderland Royal Hospital, so the services at South Tyneside will be closed or downgraded. A 14 hour a day, nurse led paediatric minor injuries and illnesses service at South Tyneside will be established in their place.

== See also ==
- List of NHS trusts
