= Somerset Partnership NHS Foundation Trust =

NHS mental health trust

- Type: Mental health trust
- Established: 1 May 2008
- Disbanded: 1 April 2020
- Chair: Stephen Ladyman
- Chief executive: Peter Lewis

Somerset Partnership NHS Foundation Trust was an NHS foundation trust which managed mental health services in the English county of Somerset. The Trust was formed in 2008, taking over the role from the Somerset Partnership NHS and Social Care Trust which had been operating since 1999.

It merged with Taunton and Somerset NHS Foundation Trust to form Somerset NHS Foundation Trust in 2020.

The trust developed out of the institution established by the Bridgwater Infirmary in the nineteenth century. Edward Colgan, the chief executive, spoke at a tribute to William Baker and John Bowen (heroes of a cholera epidemic of 1849) in September 2013.

The trust was involved in an important legal case (KL v Somerset Partnership NHS Trust) which clarified the law about community treatment orders under the Mental Health Act 2007. It was an early adopter of the NHS Friends and Family Test in August 2013.

The trust was said to regard the development of Any Qualified Provider services as an opportunity, rather than a threat. It was also a key player in the attempt by trusts in the South West of England to undermine the NHS national pay bargaining system.

In March 2015, the trust took over the Isle of Wight community dental services.

== See also ==
- Healthcare in Somerset
- List of NHS trusts
