= Musgrove Park Hospital =

- Somerset NHS Foundation Trust
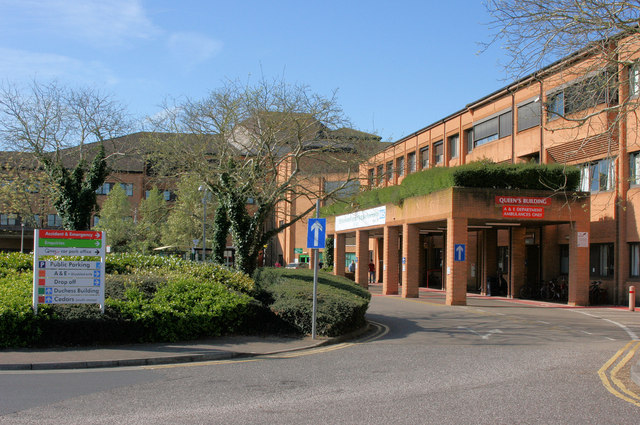
- Entrance to Musgrove Park Hospital

- Shown in Somerset

Geography
- Location: Taunton, Somerset, England, United Kingdom
- Coordinates: 51°00′44″N 3°07′14″W

Organisation
- Care system: Public NHS
- Type: District General

Services
- Emergency department: Yes Accident & Emergency
- Beds: 700

Helipads
- Helipad: Yes

History
- Founded: 1949

Links
- Website: somersetft.nhs.uk/musgrove-park-hospital/
- Lists: Hospitals in England

Musgrove Park Hospital is a large NHS hospital located in Taunton, Somerset, England, run by Somerset NHS Foundation Trust. Originally a US Army General Hospital during the Second World War, it became an NHS hospital in 1951.

== History ==
The 67th General Hospital was authorised on 3 March 1941, during the Second World War, and activated 1 September 1942 as an American Army Hospital and occupied by the U.S. Army Medical Corps. After the war, it continued in use as a Ministry of Pensions Hospital and only became a General Hospital within the National Health Service in 1951.

Early royal visits included those by Queen Elizabeth The Queen Mother in 1959 and by Princess Anne in 1970, when she opened the Intensive Therapy Unit. Following an operation on his foot in 1977, Somerset cricketer Ian Botham mistakenly walked into a children's ward at Musgrove Park. He gives this as his inspiration for raising millions of pounds for leukaemia charities.

During the great snow of February 1978, the helicopter became a familiar sight, bringing in patients with head injuries, transporting mothers in labour and supplying smaller hospitals. This was followed by the Taunton train fire of July 1978, which also affected staff and patients.

The first major development of the hospital, the Queen's Building, which provides accident and emergency, orthopaedics, endoscopy and ophthalmics as well as therapy services, was opened by Elizabeth II in 1987.

On 1 April 1991, the Taunton and Somerset NHS Trust became operational and started to manage services provided by Musgrove Park Hospital.

The Duchess Building, which provides medical and care of the elderly, outpatients, oral surgery and orthodontics, dermatology, diagnostic imaging, pharmacy and paramedical support, was opened by the Duchess of Gloucester in 1995.

In October 2006, a new multi-storey car park was opened, provided under a 25-year public-private partnership (PPP). The Cedars car park was built with 736 spaces, operated by Dutch company Q-Park. A new cardiac extension to the hospital was built at this time, providing primary angioplasty facilities.

On 1 December 2007, Taunton and Somerset NHS Trust became a Foundation Trust. As a Foundation Trust, the hospital was given greater freedoms over its finances and the 5,200 people who have registered as members were given a greater role to play in the future direction of the hospital. The Beacon Centre for cancer services opened in May 2009, meaning patients no longer had to travel to Bristol for treatment.

Between February and May 2010, a new helipad was constructed directly outside the accident and emergency department reducing patient transfer times.

In 2014, the Jubilee Building, which replaced part of the old building was completed.

On 1 April 2020, Taunton and Somerset NHS Foundation Trust merged with Somerset Partnership NHS Foundation Trust to form Somerset NHS Foundation Trust.

In 2020, the building of a new maternity building and surgical centre was announced. Construction of the new surgical unit began in July 2023 and was completed in September 2026; it was named the King's Building and also houses an Endoscopy suite, Intensive Care unit, and main theatre complex.

In January 2025, it was announced that planned upgrades to replace the inadequate maternity buildings would be delayed by 10 years. This was due to a review of the Conservative's New Hospitals Programme by the Labour government citing underfunding as the cause.

== Services ==
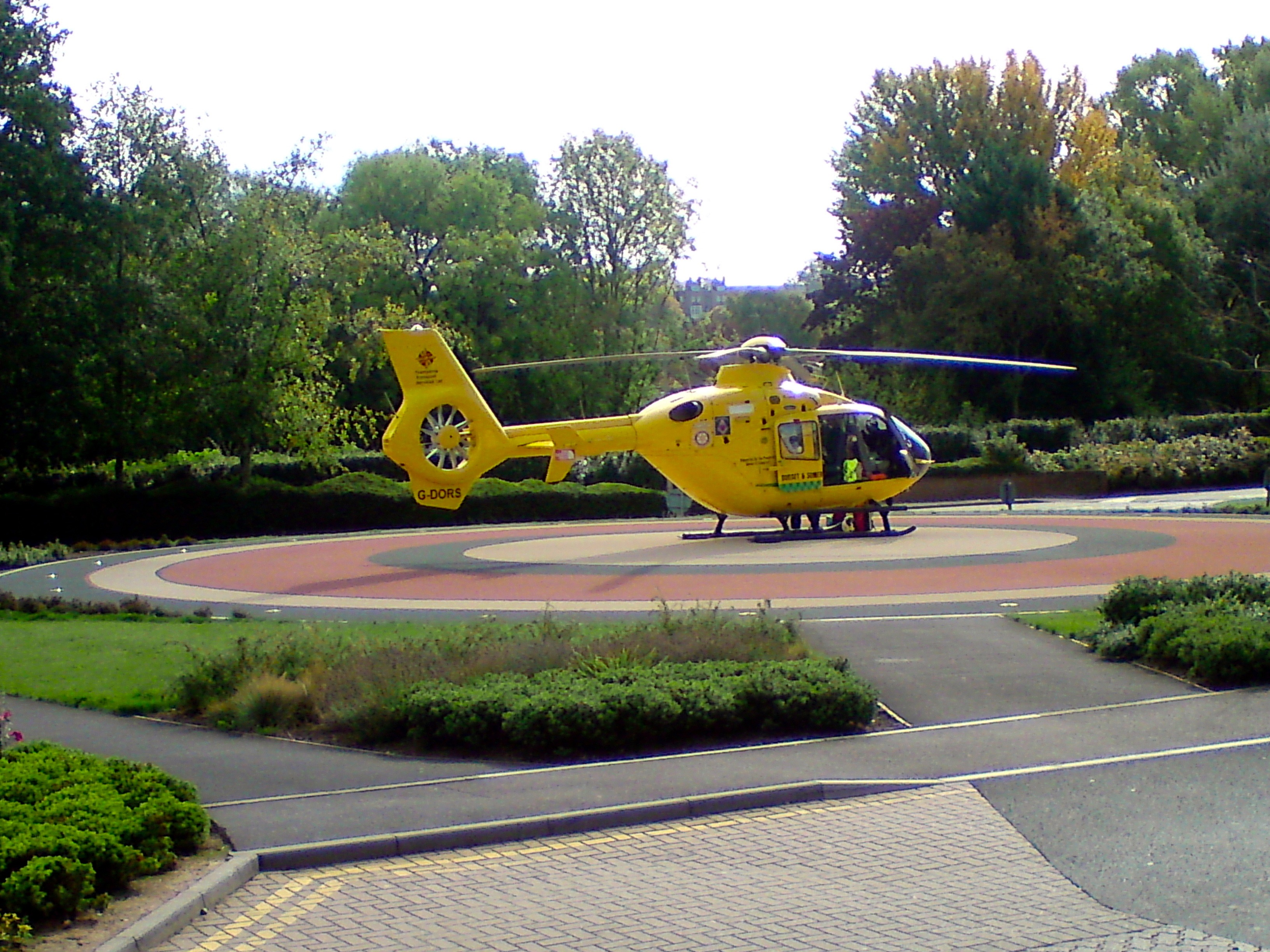
Dorset and Somerset Air Ambulance on the helipad at Musgrove Park Hospital

Musgrove Park serves a population of 340,000 - primarily living in the area served by NHS South West. Each year 41,000 patients are admitted as emergencies; 9,000 patients are admitted for elective surgery; 34,000 are seen for day case surgery; 315,500 outpatient appointments are held; 75,000 attend Accident and Emergency, 3,400 babies are born in the Maternity Department and 235,000 diagnostics tests are carried out.

The hospital has 640 beds as well as 16 operating theatres. Musgrove Park is also home to an Intensive Care and High Dependency Unit, an Acute Medical Unit, a fully equipped Diagnostic Imaging department and a specialised Children’s Department including a Paediatric High Dependency Bay. The trust also provides Neonatal Intensive Care for all of Somerset. The trust employs about 4,000 staff.

Musgrove Park was previously home to a Community Radio station housed on its campus, Apple FM, presented and run entirely by volunteers. The station is broadcast on 97.3 MHz FM throughout Taunton Deane area and beyond through the FM radio band, through their own dedicated app & website based player online, via Alexa and Google Home devices and a number of online radio station players. In January 2026, the station was told it needed to relocate as the hospital wished to reclaim its studio space, ending a 55 year presence on the site. The station finally relocated in September 2026 to alternative premises in Taunton town centre.

== Television ==
In 2007, the accident and emergency department of Musgrove Hospital was the subject of a TV fly-on-the-wall series known as Emergency: Medics.

== See also ==
- Healthcare in Somerset
- List of hospitals in England
