= Sunderland Royal Hospital =

- South Tyneside and Sunderland NHS Foundation Trust
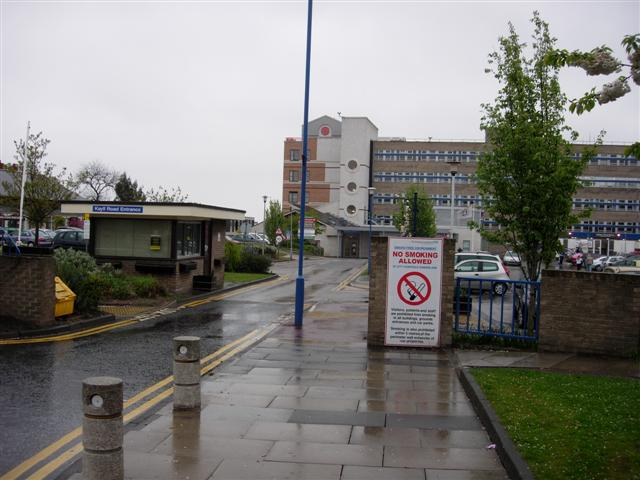
- Entrance to Sunderland Royal Hospital

- Location in Tyne and Wear

Geography
- Location: Sunderland, Tyne and Wear, England
- Coordinates: 54.9031°N 1.4097°W

Organisation
- Care system: Public NHS

History
- Founded: 1855

Links
- Lists: Hospitals in England

Sunderland Royal Hospital is an acute general hospital in Sunderland, Tyne and Wear. It is managed by the South Tyneside and Sunderland NHS Foundation Trust.

== History ==
The hospital has its origins in the Sunderland Union Workhouse Infirmary which was completed on a site to the south of Hylton Road in 1855. A new enlarged infirmary was built on the west of the workhouse in the early 20th century. The combined workhouse and infirmary facility became the Highfield Institute and Municipal Hospital in 1930 and it joined the National Health Service as Sunderland General Hospital in 1948. It was renamed Sunderland Royal Hospital in 1996.

== Services ==
Sunderland and South Tyneside clinical commissioning groups decided in February 2018 to centralise hospital based stroke, maternity, gynaecology and paediatric services at Sunderland Royal Hospital.

== Notable patient ==
British actor Sid James, best known for his roles in various Carry On films and Bless This House died there on 26 April 1976 shortly after collapsing on stage at the Sunderland Empire Theatre from a heart attack.
