= Mark Britnell =

Expert in Global Healthcare Systems and Author

Mark Douglas Britnell (born 5 January 1966) is an expert on healthcare systems and has worked extensively with organizations around the world. He is a professor at the Global Business School for Health at UCL and Adjunct Professor at the Sandra Rotman School of Management at the University of Toronto.

In September 2024 he became Chair of Health Innovation Manchester.

He is the author of two books, 'In Search of the Perfect Health System' (Palgrave Macmillan) and 'Human: solving the global workforce crisis in healthcare' (Oxford University Press).

Between 2009 and 2022 he worked for KPMG including being Vice-Chairman of KPMG UK with a focus on healthcare, a role he held until December 2022.

Prior to this he had worked in a 20 year career for the NHS. Roles included being Director General for Commissioning and System Management at the Department of Health and a member of the management board of the National Health Service (NHS) in England (July 2007–September 2009), as well as chief executive of University Hospitals Birmingham NHS Foundation Trust and the South Central Strategic Health Authority.

University Hospitals Birmingham became a first wave Foundation Trust in 2004 and Mark signed one of the largest Private Finance Initiative deals in the NHS to give Birmingham its first new teaching hospital in nearly a century. He took on the role of Director General for Commissioning and System Management at the Department of Health in the Summer of 2007.

== Education ==
Britnell grew up in Chester where he attended the local comprehensive. Having studied history at the University of Warwick, he joined the fast-track NHS Management Training Scheme in 1989, receiving his post-graduate education at Warwick Business School at the University of Warwick.

Britnell credits one of his teachers from the comprehensive school for encouraging him, as a working class kid, to go to University and is now also a guest speaker at Speakers for Schools, whose mission is to "close the opportunity gap and level the playing field for all 11-19-year-olds from state schools and colleges."

== Career ==
=== Early NHS Career ===
His early career included various management posts in the NHS, a spell with the Australian health service, a year in the civil service fast stream during which he was sponsored by the Australian College of Health Service Executives to work in Melbourne and Sydney before being seconded to the NHS Executive in 1992. Britnell joined St Mary's Hospital in London as a General Manager before being appointed as a Director at Central Middlesex Hospital (now part of North West London Hospitals NHS Trust) in 1995, when he was named Project Director for an Ambulatory Care and Diagnostic (ACAD) Private Finance Initiative (PFI) scheme - the first of its kind in the UK.

=== University Hospitals Birmingham ===
In 1998, Britnell joined University Hospital Birmingham as Director of Operations and Deputy Chief Executive becoming Chief Executive in 2000. University Hospital Birmingham became a first wave Foundation Trust in 2004. During his tenure Britnell procured the largest new hospital build in NHS history, established the Royal Centre for Defence Medicine and according to the King's Fund "developed one of the highest performing healthcare organisations in the UK."

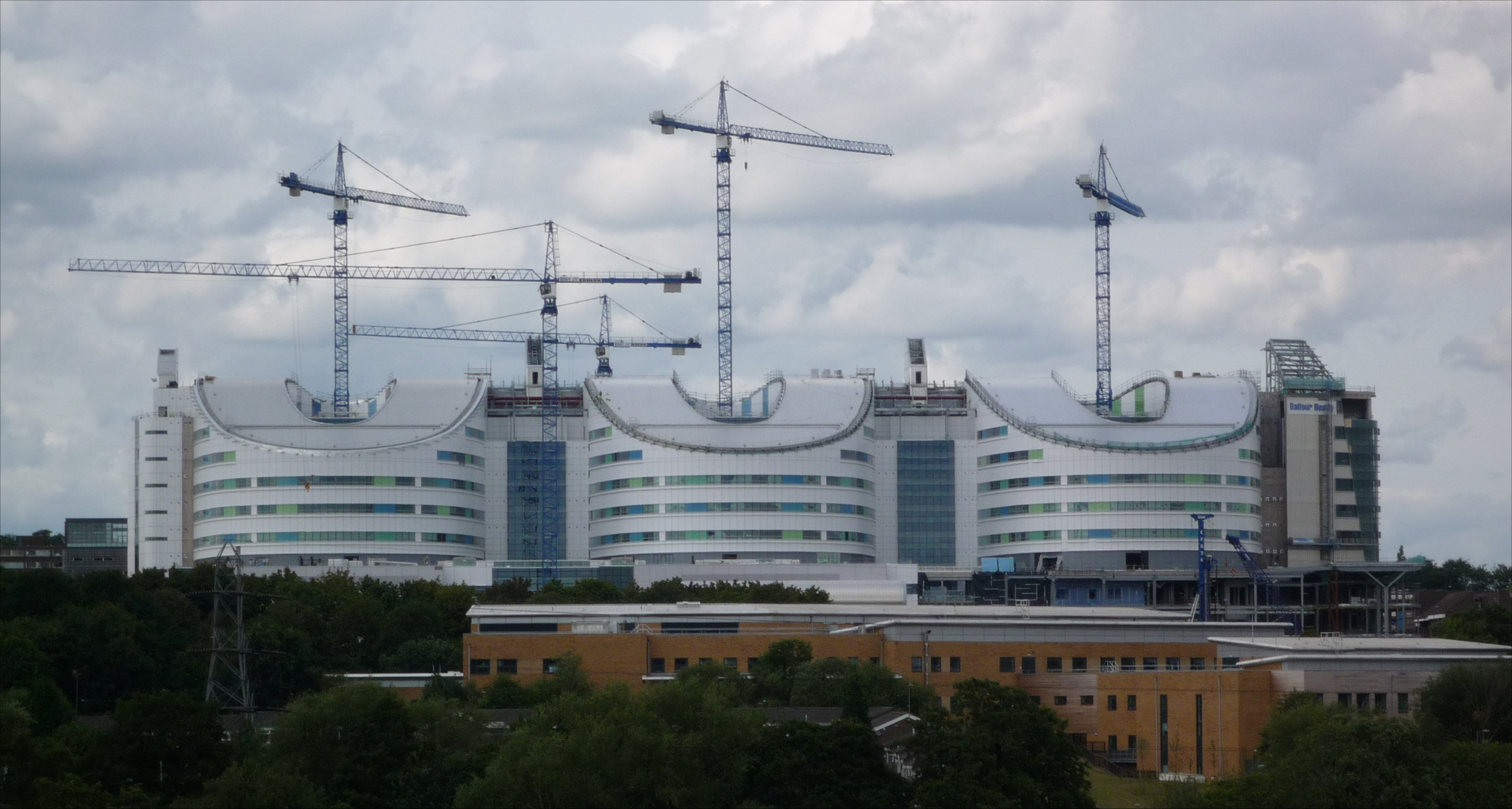
New hospital whilst under construction

The new hospital build costs were delivered under a Private Finance Initiative contract which Britnell signed with Consort Healthcare. The hospital was designed by BDP Architects and construction, which was undertaken by Balfour Beatty at a cost of £545 million.

This gave Birmingham its first new teaching hospital in nearly a century. The new hospital now called the Queen Elizabeth Hospital Birmingham is the home of the 'Royal Centre for Defence Medicine' (RCDM), which cares for injured service men and women from conflict zones, as well as being a centre for research and training for Army, Navy and Air Force medical staff. It was built in partnership with the Ministry of Defence. A quote from Britnell said the country's best medical staff were being drawn to UHB by the promise of a "truly world-class hospital".

=== NHS Leadership Roles ===
In late 2006 he was appointed as chief executive of the NHS South Central strategic health authority (covering the area from Oxford to the Isle of Wight). He was Director-General for Commissioning and System Management for the National Health Service (NHS) of England (July 2007-September 2009).

During this time Britnell was the architect of the World Class Commissioning policy, the creation of the Cooperation and Competition Panel and reforms to primary care, patient and public engagement, integrated care and community services.

Britnell said "I wanted to create something which had the discipline and rigour of the foundation [trust] assessment exercise and the stretch that gave people the ambition to raise their sights [...] we defined these 11 competencies—which I do not think anybody really disagreed with. It might strike you as slightly odd—it did me coming into the department—that no-one had defined what good commissioning was in 20 or 30 years."

=== KPMG ===
In 2009, he joined KPMG as head of health for the UK and Europe, becoming global chairman for health in 2010 and global chairman and senior partner for healthcare, government and infrastructure in 2018. He reports that in these roles he has travelled to 80 countries He finished this role in September 2020. He was then appointed as Vice-Chairman of KPMG UK with a focus on healthcare, a role he held until December 2022.

In 2021 Britnell along with Tom Riordan was shortlisted for the role of NHS Chief Executive, before the role being awarded to Amanda Pritchard. Other candidates that were ruled out earlier in the process including Conservative peer Baroness Dido Harding and Sir James Mackey, chief executive of Northumbria Healthcare Foundation Trust.

=== Recent Roles ===
In 2023 Britnell became a Professor at the Global Business School for Health at UCL and an Adjunct Professor at the Sandra Rotman School of Management at the University of Toronto.

In 2024 Britnell became Chair of Health Innovation Manchester. In the October of that year Health Innovation Manchester announced a groundbreaking strategic partnership with Eli Lilly and Company (Lilly) to initiate a five-year real-world evidence study to deepen understanding of a weight loss medication.

At the launch were the Mayor of Greater Manchester, Andy Burnham, Professor Rachel Batterham from Lilly, along with the Chair and the CEO of Health Innovation Manchester, Mark Britnell and Ben Bridgewater respectively.

Mark Britnell said that, owing to its strengths in life sciences, academia, and digital sectors, Greater Manchester has the potential to be a leading centre for health innovation. He stated that this is reflected in its partnership with Lilly, which he said could further develop these sector strengths and benefit local patients.”

== Books ==
=== In Search of the Perfect Health System (2015) ===
In October 2015, Britnell wrote 'In Search of the Perfect Health System', an analysis of health systems around the world and seven key trends facing healthcare globally. Britnell provides 25 concise sketches about national healthcare systems, which form the core of the book.

Models from countries like the UK, the US, Singapore, and others, are assessed offering a comparative analysis of what works and what doesn't in providing effective, sustainable, and equitable healthcare.

The book also suggests solutions and offers insights into how healthcare systems can be improved. Britnell emphasizes the importance of learning from successful models while recognizing that there is no one-size-fits-all solution. His goal is to provide policymakers, healthcare leaders, and readers with a deeper understanding of the complex dynamics of healthcare systems and practical guidance on how to achieve better health outcomes for populations.

It won the health and social care category in the British Medical Association's Medical Book Awards 2016 and Best Health Book in China in 2017 from the Chinese Medical Doctors Association.

=== Human: solving the global workforce crisis in healthcare (2019) ===
In March 2019 he wrote 'Human: solving the global workforce crisis in healthcare'. It is a response to the warning from the World Health Organization that by 2030 there will be a global shortage of around 18 million healthcare workers – about a fifth of the required workforce. Lord Nigel Crisp wrote in the book's foreword that it could serve as a guide for politicians and practitioners.

In the book Britnell focuses on the pressing challenges faced by the global healthcare workforce. Britnell examines the widespread shortages of healthcare professionals, the impact these shortages have on patient care, and the sustainability of healthcare systems worldwide. He argues that these workforce challenges are critical to the future of healthcare and presents potential solutions for addressing the crisis.

Britnell draws on his experience in economics, management, Human Resources (HR), organisational strategy, health systems science, public sector and corporate leadership to create a rich picture of health workforce challenges in context.

Britnell explores how countries and organizations can better manage, train, and support healthcare workers. The book also highlights innovative models and approaches to workforce development, including the use of technology, new ways of organizing care, and collaboration across borders. Ultimately, Human is a call to action for policymakers, healthcare leaders, and others to work together to ensure a capable and resilient healthcare workforce in the face of growing global demands.

Royalties of his books go to the charity Prostate Cancer UK.

== Memberships, Awards, and Philanthropy ==
Via KPMG he was a member of the World Economic Forum Global Agenda Council on the Future of the Health Sector for four years. He is a Trustee of the King's Fund. He has honorary degrees from Birmingham City University and University of Wolverhampton, and an honorary professorship at Taishan Medical University School in China. He also sits on the advisory board of the China Center for Health Development at Peking University.

Britnell has been a Non-Executive Director at Dr Foster, a trustee of the British Pregnancy Advisory Service and a Board member of Prostate Cancer UK. He survived prostate cancer at the age of 42 and has donated all royalties from the sale of his books to Prostate Cancer UK. He has often praised the NHS for saving his life.

He is also a guest speaker for Speakers for Schools, which is supported by Robert Peston and the Law Family Charitable Foundation.

== Health and Social Care Act 2012 ==
In 2010, while addressing a conference of global healthcare executives in the US, Britnell's reported comments on the British Health and Social Care Act 2012 drew significant media attention. Reports, including those in The Observer, quoted Britnell as saying:

"In future, The NHS will be a state insurance provider not a state deliverer", and that "The NHS will be shown no mercy and the best time to take advantage of this will be in the next couple of years."

The background was intense press speculation around the (then) upcoming Health and Social Care Act 2012 and what some of the clauses of the Act could mean, the role of Sir David Nicholson, Chief executive of the NHS within the Department of Health since September 2006, and potential successors (which included Britnell).

KPMG issued a press statement on behalf of Britnell which refuted the accuracy of the quotation, and within which Britnell stated "I have always been a passionate advocate of the NHS and believe that it has a great future."

The Health Service Journal website published a longer quote from Britnell. saying "The vast majority” of NHS care will “always and quite rightly” be provided by “public sector organisations and paid for out of taxation."

== Publications ==
- In Search of the Perfect Health System, Palgrave 2015 ISBN 978-1-137-49661-4
- Human: Solving the global workforce crisis in healthcare, Oxford University Press 2019 ISBN 978-0-198-83652-0
