= Great Ormond Street Hospital for Children NHS Foundation Trust =

Children's hospital trust in England

Coordinates: 51.52262°N 0.12036°W

- Type: NHS Foundation Trust
- Hospitals: Great Ormond Street Hospital
- Website: www.gosh.nhs.uk

Great Ormond Street Hospital for Children NHS Foundation Trust is an NHS Foundation Trust that operates Great Ormond Street Hospital. It is closely associated with University College London (UCL) and in partnership with the UCL Institute of Child Health, which it is located adjacent to, is the largest centre for research and postgraduate teaching in children’s health in Europe. It is part of both the Great Ormond Street Hospital/UCL Institute of Child Health Biomedical Research Centre and the UCL Partners academic health science centre.

Great Ormond Street Hospital NHS Trust became a foundation trust on 1 March 2012.

== Research ==
The hospital works with the UCL Institute of Child Health, and is the largest centre for research into childhood illness outside the United States and Canada, and a major international trainer of doctors and nurses. It has the widest range of children's specialists of any UK hospital, and is the largest centre for children's heart or brain surgery, or for children with cancer, in the UK. Recent high-profile breakthroughs include successful gene-therapy for immune diseases.

The trust is a member of the UCL Partners academic health science centre. The trust has one of the 11 Genomics Medicines Centres associated with Genomics England which will open across England in February 2014. All the data produced in the 100,000 Genomes project will be made available to drugs companies and researchers to help them create precision drugs for future generations.

An informatics hub, called DRIVE (Digital, Research, Informatics and Virtual Environments), was launched in October 2018 in partnership with University College London. Patients at the hospital are said to be digital natives who will naturally embrace the technology. One proposal is a recreation of the hospital in Minecraft so that patients can virtually explore it before they actually visit.

== Private patients ==
The trust increased private income by 18.9% from 2014 to 2016, a total of £43 million. 80% of its private patient income comes from overseas. Income rose to £55.2 million in 2106/7. In July 2017 £24.4 million was overdue from patients based abroad, mostly in cases of sponsorship by a government or other international organisation. £1.5 million was owed by the Saudi Health Office and £2.7 million by the Kuwaiti Health Office. The trust sued the Libyan Government for £1.5 million in unpaid bills in September 2017. In June 2019 it was owed a total of £45.9 million for international private patient work after increasing international private work, most of which comes through embassies based in London, by 9.1% to £62.3 million in 2018-19. It plans to continue increasing by 10% a year with "marketing road shows" in China, Russia and India.

== Performance ==
It was named by the Health Service Journal as one of the top hundred NHS trusts to work for in 2015. At that time it had 3652 full time equivalent staff and a sickness absence rate of 2.63%. 84% of staff recommend it as a place for treatment and 73% recommended it as a place to work.

In April 2012, BBC One London broadcast a documentary called "Great Ormond Street Hospital", presented by Tim Donovan, which explained how the trust is facing accusations that it is downgrading child protection work and "victimising" staff who raise concerns. The hospital posted a detailed response stating that "the allegations in this programme are not correct and the programme does not provide a balanced position".

In February 2016 it emerged that the trust had not properly recorded waiting time information for patients in the outpatient, surgical and diagnostic divisions. The waiting list grew from 2,000 to more than 9,000 as a result.

== Death of Baby P ==
In 2009, Great Ormond Street Hospital was criticised for their role in Baby P's death. Consultant paediatrician Kim Holt and three colleagues wrote to Great Ormond Street Hospital managers in 2006, a year before Baby P's death warning that understaffing and poor record keeping posed a serious risk to patients' safety at St Anne's clinic in Haringey, north London. Kim Holt said bosses ignored her warnings and removed her from the clinic. Paediatrician Kim Holt told in an interview the hospital offered her £120,000 to withdraw her complaints in the wake of Peter's death, a claim the hospital denied. In 2011, Great Ormond Street Hospital and Haringey primary care trust issued an apology to Holt stating "Both Trusts accept and are sorry that you have been through a difficult time. You are a respected and valued member of staff and we look forward to you resuming your role in community paediatrics very soon".

In 2014, following a BBC documentary into Baby P's case, Great Ormond Street Hospital released a statement stating they have publicly apologised for their failings and have worked since to make sure improvements were made. The hospital takes its responsibility in the safeguarding of children's safety and welfare very seriously.

== See also ==
- List of NHS trusts
