= HITF =

HITF may refer to

- Human Interference Task Force, an organization aiming to prevent unintentional entries to radioactive waste facilities
- Hillsboro Intermodal Transit Facility, a parking garage in Oregon, U.S.
- Health Insurance Task Force (see Association of British HealthTech Industries)
