= Greater Manchester Health and Social Care Partnership =

- Formation: 2014; 12 years ago
- Founder: George Osborne Government of the United Kingdom
- Type: Governmental organization
- Legal status: Integrated care system
- Purpose: Managing the health service in the Greater Manchester area
- Location: Manchester, United Kingdom
- Origins: 2014 Sustainability and transformation plan
- Region served: Greater Manchester
- Services: Health care
- Owner: Government of the United Kingdom
- Co-Chair: Mayor Andy Burnham
- Co-Chair: Sir Richard Leese
- Affiliations: NHS Greater Manchester or NHS GM
- Website: gmintegratedcare.org.uk

The Greater Manchester Health and Social Care Partnership is a British government health care organisation that coordinates the decisions about health care policy in the Greater Manchester area and consists of representatives of the NHS and local councils under the integrated care system.

== History ==
The Greater Manchester Health and Social Care Partnership was established in 2015 as one of the first Sustainability and transformation plans in England as a key part of devolution in the United Kingdom. It was then transformed into an integrated care system. It covers 2.8 million people living in ten boroughs. It is made up of the 37 NHS organisations and councils in the city region.

It sprang from the settlement agreed on 3 November 2014 by George Osborne and was the first agreement to give council leaders a say in the health and social care budget, which in Greater Manchester was about £6 billion a year. It was linked to the establishment of the new, directly elected mayor of Greater Manchester, although the mayor's powers over health and social care are very limited. The deal doesn’t include the power to raise local taxes to control the size of the budget.

A joint commissioning board was established including Clinical Commissioning Groups, local authorities and NHS England - but not general practitioners. Lord Peter Smith, leader of Wigan Metropolitan Borough Council was the first chair of the board. Social care was identified as a major problem very early on, and there was a target to reduce expenditure by £2 billion over five years. The ambition was to cut spending on hospitals and invest more in early public health, with a significant reallocation of the resources that go into crisis care to preventative care.

Initiatives included offering pregnant women smokers a £10 voucher for every week they remain smoke-free, with a further £60 if they stay off cigarettes three months after birth. In August 2021 the Partnerships’ Smoke-free Pregnancy programme, set up in 2018, announced that Smoking at the Time of Delivery rates had fallen by around a quarter in four years – down from 12.6% of new mothers in 2017-18 to 9.8% in 2020-21.

Prof Sir Michael Marmot in a report commissioned by the partnership in 2019 found that the COVID-19 pandemic in England had exposed and amplified health inequalities in Greater Manchester, where the death rate had been 25% higher than the rest of England. He said his recommendations were not just about health care or just about public health. "They're about housing and transport and community development and jobs and schools." - areas where the powers of the partnership were very limited.

The partnership is closely associated with Health Innovation Manchester.

Mark Fisher was appointed chief executive in March 2022.

The GP Community Pharmacist Consultation Service was established in April 2022. By November 2022 97% of GP practices were signed up and almost 14,000 appointments had been referred. 20% of referrals were for children under the age of 10, mostly with skin complaints.
