= David Garman =

British inventor and businessman (1922–2019)

David Edmund Talbot Garman OBE
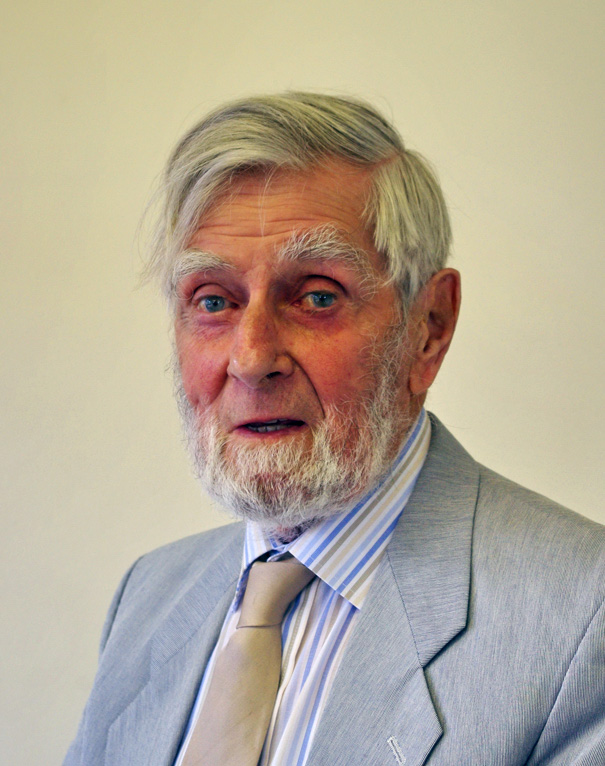
- Born: 9 May 1922; Thakeham, West Sussex, England
- Died: 4 January 2019 (aged 96)
- Occupations: British inventor, businessman and philanthropist
- Children: 4
- Awards: HTV Design Award; BHTA (British Healthcare Trades Association) Lifetime Service Award; Officer of the Order of the British Empire; Inducted into the Ambulance Service Hall of Fame

David Edmund Talbot Garman OBE (9 May 1922 – 4 January 2019) was a British inventor and businessman who was based in mid-Wales.

== Early life and career ==
He was born in Thakeham in West Sussex, England, in May 1922.

Garman invented the first portable powered bath lift in 1981 —a lift to assist people with mobility problems getting in and out of the bath.

He was the founder and chairman of Mangar International Limited, Mangar International (Holdings) Limited and Mangar 2013 Limited. Mangar International Ltd now sells bathlifts and other lifting devices to hospitals and care homes across the world, as well as to private and commercial buyers. Mangar is an anagram of Garman.

Garman's inventions consisted of patient lifting and handling equipment now used internationally in private dwellings, day centres, hospitals and care homes, as well as by ambulance services. He invented, designed and manufactured these products through Mangar International Limited which he founded with his wife, Francesca, in 1981. They ran Mangar International Limited, based in Presteigne in Powys, mid-Wales, until he was well into his 90s. It was then sold in January 2014. However, even in his very late 'retirement' he continued inventing right up until his final months. The resulting product development is being carried out through David E. T. Garman Concepts Ltd, which was founded by Garman's family in September 2013.

David E. T. Garman Concepts Limited was named after him and was founded in September 2013. Garman's last invention was the "Air Cradle" patient transfer system, which he co-invented with Austin Owens with whom David E. T. Garman Concepts Limited continues to collaborate. The "Air Cradle" patient transfer system is an alternative to hoists and slings used in patient transfer. On 7 May 2019, the AIR CRADLE® Patient Transfer System was short-listed in The Blackwood Design Awards 2019 'BEST NEW CONCEPT' category. On 15 May 2019, the AIR CRADLE® Patient Transfer System was a finalist in The Blackwood Design Awards 2019 'BEST NEW CONCEPT' category. On 18 February 2020, the AIR CRADLE® Transfer System was short-listed for 'Innovation of the Year' in The National Technology Awards 2020.

He was also the Chairman of M.F.C. International Limited. Prior to acquiring M.F.C. International Ltd (then known as M.F.C. Survival Ltd), Mangar International Ltd had had a working relationship with MFC for over 20 years.

He was a Director of The Radnorshire Wildlife Trust Limited.

== Death ==
Garman died in mid-Wales on 4 January 2019. The BBC broadcast a Radio 4 obituary about Garman on 15 and 17 February 2019.

== Affordable housing in Lyme Regis ==
With the support of his nephew, Bernie Kevill (a son of his late sister Elizabeth), Garman was instrumental in the development of affordable housing in Lyme Regis, Dorset, England. He sold very cheaply part of his land on the outskirts of Lyme Regis to Lyme Regis Community Land Trust to build 15 affordable homes. The development sits on Timber Hill and is named Garman's Field because of this.

== Woodlands ==
Garman invested heavily in the preservation of flora and fauna in Wales, where he planted one of the largest broad-leaved woodlands of more than 10,000 trees near Llandrindod Wells.

== Awards and honours ==
In 1981, aged 59, Garman won the HTV Design Award for his first invention, the world's first portable powered bath lift. This award resulted in some publicity but very little financial assistance.

In 2007, aged 85, Garman was awarded the BHTA (British Healthcare Trades Association) Lifetime Service Award for his contribution and dedication to the rehabilitation industry.

Garman was also, aged 92, made an Officer of the Order of the British Empire for "services to the healthcare industry" by Queen Elizabeth II in the 2015 New Year Honours.

In May 2019, some four months after Garman's death at the age of 96, the AIR CRADLE® Patient Transfer System, co-invented by Garman and Austin Owens, was a finalist in The Blackwood Design Awards 2019 - 'BEST NEW CONCEPT' category.

On 22 October 2019, Garman was inducted into the Ambulance Service Hall of Fame for his individual contribution to the safety and well-being of patients.

On 18 February 2020, the AIR CRADLE® Transfer System was short-listed for 'Innovation of the Year' in The National Technology Awards 2020.

On 6 January 2021, the AIR CRADLE® Transfer System was nominated for 'Best Medical Device Solution' in the MedTech Breakthrough Awards 2021.
