= Herbert Parker (health physicist) =

Herbert M. Parker (13 April 1910, Accrington – 5 March 1984, Richland, Washington) was an English, and American immigrant, medical physicist. He was a pioneer of medical radiation therapy and radiation safety, known for introducing the roentgen equivalent physical (rep), the forerunner of the gray and the rad, and also the roentgen equivalent biological (reb), the forerunner of the rem and the sievert.

== Career ==
After receiving an M.S. in physics from the University of Manchester in 1931, Parker became a medical physicist at the Christie Hospital and the Holt Radium Institute in Manchester. With James R. Paterson, he developed in 1932 the Paterson-Parker method, or Manchester System, for radiation therapy. The method allows physicians to use radium needles or tubes to maximize the radiation dose delivered to a cancerous tumour whilst minimizing the dose to healthy tissue. In 1938, Parker immigrated to the US to begin work at the Swedish Hospital in Seattle, where he worked with the radiologist Simeon T. Cantril on Supervoltage Therapy research at the Tumor Institute. In 1942, Parker went to the University of Chicago to work on the Manhattan Project at the Metallurgical Laboratory. In 1943, he went to Clinton Engineer Works to establish the health physics program for the U.S. atomic energy program. In 1944, Parker returned to the state of Washington to initiate the health physics program at the Hanford Engineer Works. In 1947, he became manager of operations and research in radiological science. In 1956, he was promoted to become the overall manager at the Hanford Laboratories, holding this position until 1965 when operation of Hanford Laboratories was transferred from GE to Battelle Memorial Institute.

Working with James Ralston Kennedy Paterson, developed the Paterson-Parker rules for the Radium Dosage System also known as the Manchester system.

== Honors ==
In 1978, Parker was elected to the National Academy of Engineering. He was made a Fellow of the American Physical Society in 1953 and of the British Institute of Physics. He received in 1955 the Janeway Medal of the American Radium Society.
