= MCRC =

MCRC may refer to:

- metastatic colorectal cancer
- Manchester Cancer Research Centre, England
- Mass Communication Research Centre, at the Jamia Millia Islamia university, in Delhi, India
- Middlebury College Rugby Club, rugby union club in Vermont, United States
- Marine Corps Recruiting Command
