= Manchester Academic Health Science Centre =

Coordinates: 53.4619120°N 2.2283275°W

Geography
- Location: Greater Manchester, United Kingdom

Organisation
- Care system: NHS
- Type: Academic health science centre

History
- Opened: June 2008

Links
- Website: https://healthinnovationmanchester.com/partnerships/manchester-academic-health-science-centre/

The Manchester Academic Health Science Centre (MAHSC; /ˈmæsk/) is an academic health science centre based in Manchester, United Kingdom. It is a partnership between the University of Manchester and four NHS organizations in Greater Manchester. It was originally established in June 2008, with re-designation most recently in April 2020 by the National Institute for Health and Care Research (NIHR) and NHS England/NHS Improvement. The most recent designation is from April 2020 to March 2025. It is now (2025) one of eight academic health science centres in England designated for excellence in health research, education, and patient care.

== Health Innovation Manchester ==
In October 2017, MAHSC collaborated with Greater Manchester Academic Health Science Network (GM-AHSN) to create an integrated academic health science and innovation system, Health Innovation Manchester (HIM). In this collaboration, MAHSC contributed with their translational research power, while GM-AHSN provided their adoption, diffusion machinery, and expertise.

As part of Health Innovation Manchester, MAHSC works with British academic health science centres and NHS partners in Greater Manchester to further advance medical research.

== MAHSC partners ==
Manchester Academic Health Science Centre comprises:

- The University of Manchester
- Manchester University NHS Foundation Trust
- The Christie NHS Foundation Trust
- Greater Manchester Mental Health NHS Foundation Trust
- Salford Royal NHS Foundation Trust

== Research domains ==
The MAHSC discovery and translation strategy is delivered by six domains, each led jointly by an academic and an NHS clinician and chaired by a CEO from a partner trust. The domains are:

- Cancer
- Cardiovascular & Diabetes
- Inflammation & Repair
- Mental Health
- Neuroscience
- Women & Children

with cross-cutting expertise in applied health (working closely with the NIHR Applied Research Collaboration Greater Manchester), digital health, and precision medicine.

Crucially, research projects undertaken via MAHSC and Greater Manchester’s other research bodies are pulled through HIM’s innovation pipeline to provide a pathway of evidence-based innovations that can be deployed at pace and scale.

== History ==
The creation of the Manchester Academic Health Science Centre was announced by the then health secretary, Alan Johnson, in March 2009.

The designation was renewed by the Department of Health and Social Care in April 2014 for 5 years, with a one-year extension then granted to March 2020.

The most recent designation is from April 2020 to March 2025.

== See also ==
- Health Innovation Manchester
- Healthcare in Greater Manchester
