= Manchester Cancer Research Centre =

Research centre in England

The Manchester Cancer Research Centre (MCRC) was established in 2006 by the University of Manchester, Cancer Research UK and The Christie NHS Foundation Trust. It has since been expanded through the Manchester Academic Health Science Centre to include Central Manchester University Hospitals NHS Foundation Trust, Salford Royal NHS Foundation Trust, University Hospital of South Manchester NHS Foundation Trust, Manchester Mental Health and Social Care Trust and Salford Clinical Commissioning Group. The main office of the MCRC is at Withington but many of the researchers are based elsewhere.

== See also ==
- Cancer in the United Kingdom
