= Röntgen equivalent physical =

The Röntgen equivalent physical or rep (symbol rep) is a legacy unit of absorbed dose first introduced by Herbert Parker in 1945 to replace an improper application of the roentgen unit to biological tissue. It is the absorbed energetic dose before the biological efficiency of the radiation is factored in. The rep has variously been defined as 83 or 93 ergs per gram of tissue (8.3/9.3 mGy) or per cm^{3} of tissue.

At the time, this was thought to be the amount of energy deposited by 1 roentgen. Improved measurements have since found that one roentgen of air kerma deposits 8.77 mGy in dry air, or 9.6 mGy in soft tissue, but the rep was defined as a fixed number of ergs per unit gram.

A 1952 handbook from the US National Bureau of Standards affirms that "The numerical coefficient of the rep has been deliberately changed to 93, instead of the earlier 83, to agree with L. H. Gray's 'energy-unit'." Gray's 'energy unit' was " one roentgen of hard gamma resulted in about 93 ergs per gram energy absorption in water". The lower range value of 83.8 ergs was the value in air corresponding to wet tissue. The rep was commonly used until the 1960s, but was gradually displaced by the rad starting in 1954 and later the gray starting in 1977.

== See also ==
- Radiation poisoning
- Röntgen equivalent man (rem)
