= Ralston Paterson =

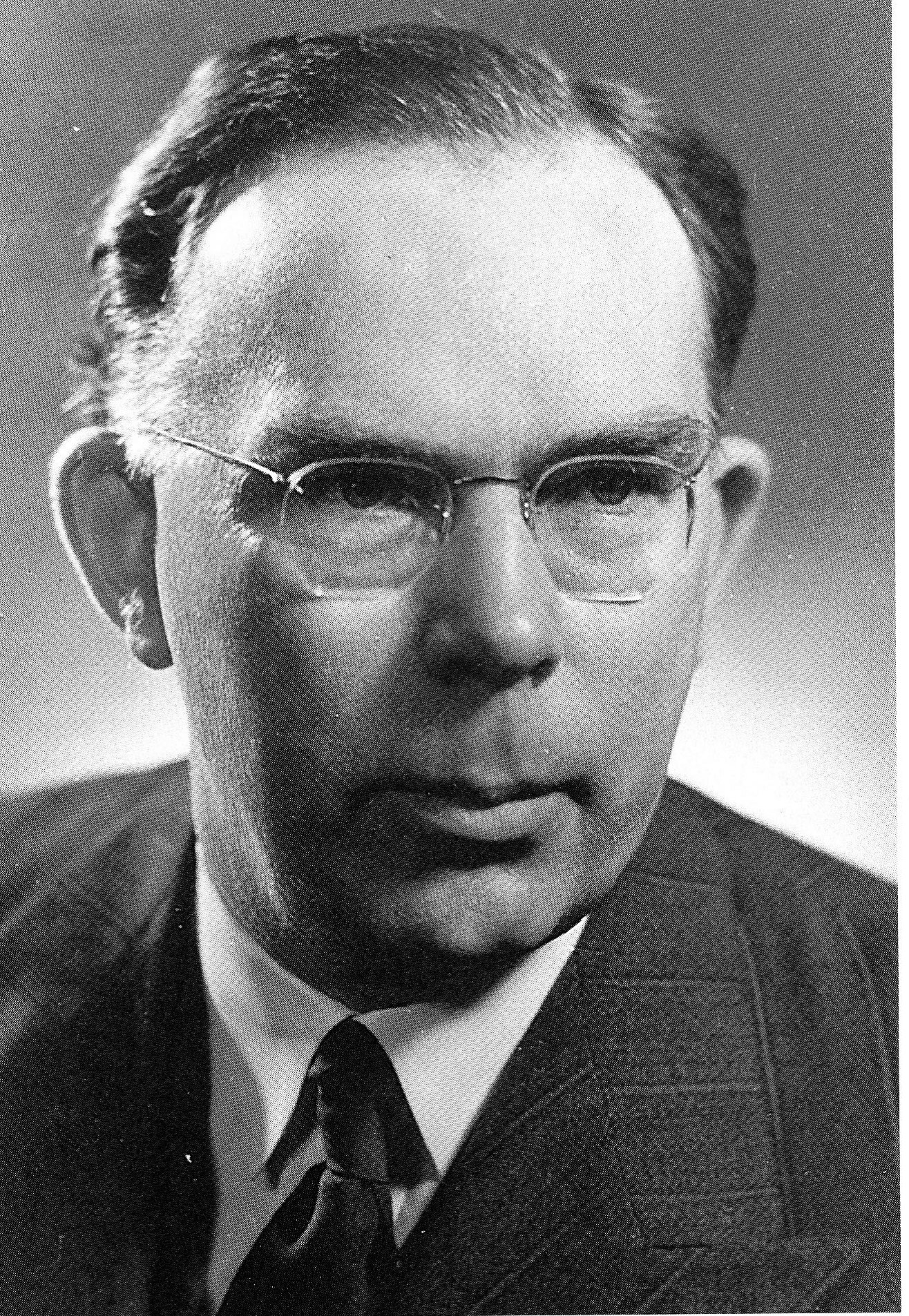
Ralston Paterson (1897–1981)

James Ralston Kennedy "RP" Paterson, CBE MC FRCS FRCR (21 May 1897 – 29 August 1981) was a Scottish medical doctor and scientist specialising in oncology and radiology. Along with Herbert Parker, pioneered the development of the Paterson-Parker rules for the Radium Dosage System, also known as the Manchester system.

== Early life ==
Ralston Paterson was born on 21 May 1897 in Edinburgh, Scotland. He attended George Heriot’s School and upon graduation served as an officer in World War I with the Argyll and Sutherland Highlanders and was decorated with the Military Cross.

== Medical career ==
After the War, Paterson returned to the Royal Infirmary of Edinburgh and in 1923 was awarded Bachelor of Medicine, Bachelor of Surgery (MBChB) with honors. In 1926 he became a fellow of the Royal College of Surgeons of Edinburgh, and in 1927 he was granted the Doctor of Medicine (MD) with commendation. At Edinburgh he met his wife and collaborator Edith Paterson, née Jones, known as "EP". The couple had three children, David, Colin and Elspeth.

In 1925, his interest in radiology led to his taking the Royal College of Radiologists disploma (DMRE) at Cambridge. Paterson went to the Mayo Clinic for a fellowship in radiology. He received further training in radiotherapy at clinics at the University of Chicago, in Toronto and South Africa. He returned in 1930 to the Royal Infirmary of Edinburgh as acting director of the radiotherapy department.

In 1931, Paterson was appointed as radiotherapy director of the recently combined Holt Radium Institute and Christie Hospital in Manchester. Edith Paterson began her research at the Holt institute without position or salary. She in time developed her own reputation as a researcher.

In November 1943, Paterson and his wife were invited by the government of Australia, including Queensland and Victoria, to assist with the establishment of a cancer institute that would provide medical care and services to the community. The Australian government allocated £100,000 for an institute dedicated to cancer treatment and research, with treatment methodologies to focus on X-rays and radium. Paterson retired in 1962 and he and his wife devoted their efforts to the running of a cattle and sheep farm at Stenreishill, near Moffat, Scotland. He died at home in his sleep. Edith would continue to run the farm until 1992.

== Professional accomplishments ==
Peterson received numerous accolades and awards in his career.

- British Association of Radiotherapists, president, 1938-1939
- Founding member, Royal College of Radiologists (then known as the Faculty of Radiologists)
- President, Faculty of Radiologists, 1943-1946
- Military Cross (MC), 1917
- Bachelor of Medicine, Bachelor of Surgery (MBChB) with Honors, Edinburgh, 1923
- Diploma in Medical Radiology & Electrology (DMRE), Cambridge, 1924
- MD with Commendation, 1927
- Fellow of the Royal College of Surgeons of Edinburgh (FRCSEd), Edinburgh, 1927
- Fellowship of the Faculty of Radiology (FFR), 1938
- Fellowship of the Royal College of Surgeons (FRCS), 1948
- Commander of the Most Excellent Order of the British Empire (CBE), 1950
- Professor of Radiotherapy, University of Manchester, 1960
- Gold medal, Worshipful Society of Apothecaries, 1961
- President, International Congress of Radiology in London, 1950
- Gold Medal, Faculty of Radiologists, 1966

== Legacy ==
Working with Herbert Parker, Paterson developed the Paterson-Parker rules for the Radium Dosage System also known as the Manchester system.

The Cancer Research Campaign named their Paterson Institute for Cancer Research at The Christie hospital in Manchester after Paterson. Although since renamed the Cancer Research UK Manchester Institute, it occupies the Paterson Building, a modern 25,000 square metres (270,000 sq ft) laboratory completed in 2024.

== Select publications ==
- Paterson, Ralston, and Herbert M. Parker. (1934). "A dosage system for gamma ray therapy." The British Journal of Radiology. 7(82): 592-632.
- Paterson, Ralston, and Herbert M. Parker. (1938). "A dosage system for interstitial radium therapy." The British Journal of Radiology. 11(124): 252-266.
