= Caroline Shaw (healthcare administrator) =

British healthcare administrator

Caroline Shaw CBE is a British healthcare administrator and Chief Executive of Evergreen Life.

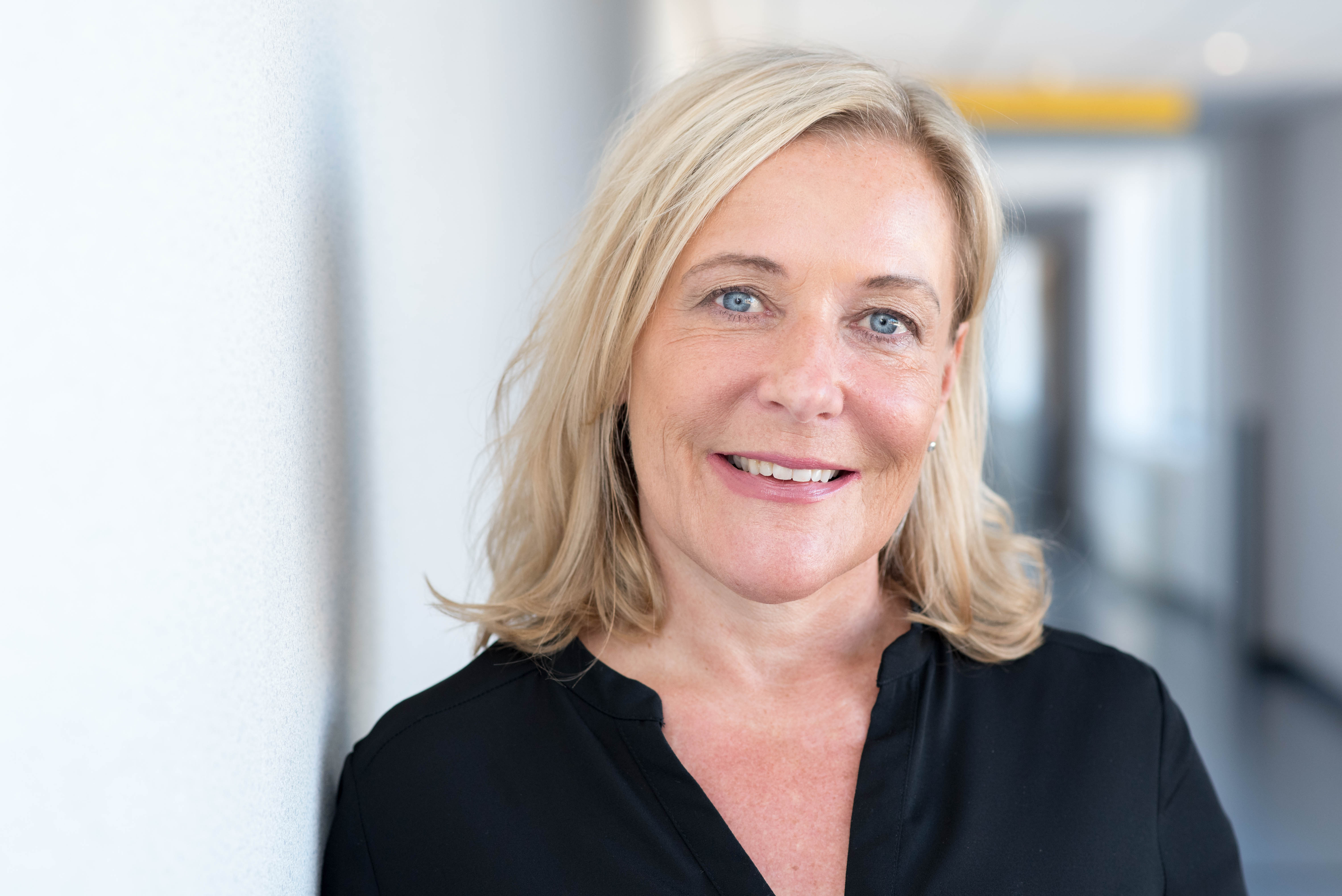

Caroline Shaw was born in the Lake District and originally worked as a midwife. She graduated from Birmingham University with an MSc degree in Healthcare Policy and Management in 1999.

Shaw was chief executive of the Christie Hospital NHS Foundation Trust, the specialist cancer centre in Manchester, from 2005 to 2014. She was one of the youngest female Chief Executives in the NHS when she was appointed. Shaw was involved in creating a network of services to beat national waiting time targets and enacted the first phase one clinical trial site of its type.

While at the Christie she oversaw the development of a £35 million patient treatment centre at The Christie and the building of a network of Christie radiotherapy centres. In 2006 Shaw helped launch the Manchester Cancer Research Centre in partnership with Manchester University and Cancer Research UK. In 2011 Shaw was reported to be the 33rd highest paid manager in the NHS.

Shaw was appointed a Commander of the Order of the British Empire (CBE) in the 2013 New Year Honours for services to the NHS. She was the first- NHS winner of a First Women Award in 2010, given for her work in improving services for cancer patients. She was chosen as Patron for the 'Network National' for UK business women in 2009, received the North West Inspiring Woman of the Year award in 2007 and Crain's Manchester Businesses Businesswoman of the Year award in 2009.

During her time at The Christie, Shaw was seconded to a region-wide turnaround role as Regional Director of Provider Development for Strategic Health Authority North West. The position involved managing relationships with stakeholders, including the Secretary of State for Health, through to delivering a 14-provider transformation programme for the North West of England - a number of which achieved foundation trust status to merge with higher performing units.

She was suspended from her duties at Christie Hospital on 19 December 2013 while investigations were conducted as part of a disciplinary process. It was alleged that she had made an improper claim for the payment of expenses for a retreat in Ibiza organised by the Young Presidents' Organization, of which she had become a member with the Trust’s agreement. She resigned her post in October 2014, having been suspended on full pay for 11 months- amounting to £170,000 and left with another six months salary - just under £100,000.

In November 2014 Shaw was appointed Director of Emergency Patient Pathway at Nottingham University Hospitals NHS Trust. In October 2015 she became the Chief Operating Officer of the service and was instrumental in the Trust avoiding an enforced merger and saving £40m in a single year through a cost improvement programme. During her time in the role, the Trust also became a Biomedical Research Centre and featured in BBC’s Hospital show.

In January 2019, Shaw joined the Queen Elizabeth Hospital in King’s Lynn, Norfolk as their Interim CEO. During her time in post she led the trust out of special measures. She oversaw the purchase of Sandringham Hospital in 2020 and a new 26-bed elective treatment centre.

Currently she is Chief Executive of digital health solutions provider Evergreen Life, having previously been its Chief Operations Officer from October 2022 up until October 2023. The company focuses on personalised health advice, access to health records and cost-effective preventative research, aimed at improving the nation’s health outcomes. In 2024 she was listed in the E2E Female 100 track, which recognises the 100 fastest-growing female-led or founded businesses in the United Kingdom, based on growth rates over the past three years.
