= Epithelioma =

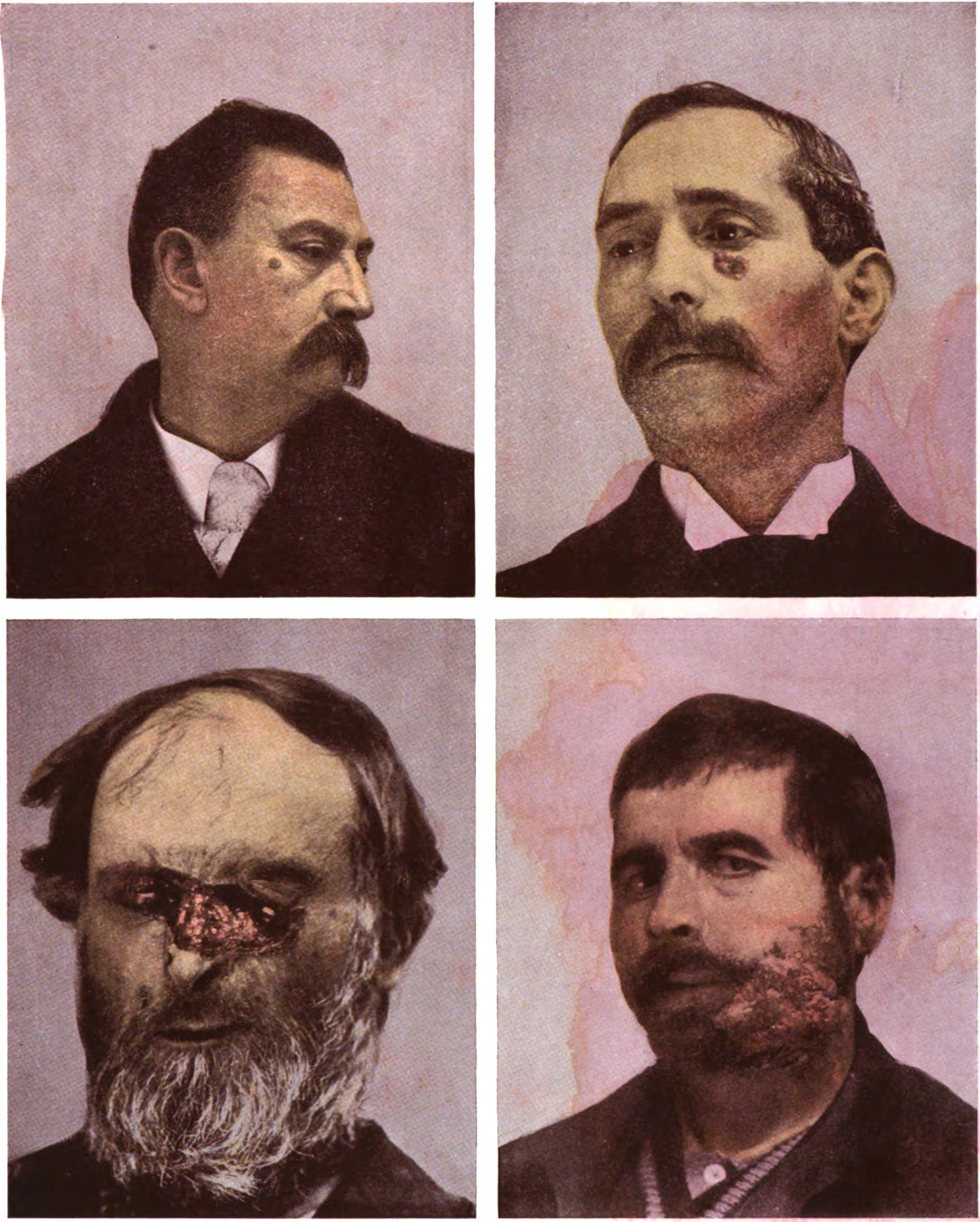
- Epitheliomas of varying size and location
- Specialty: Oncology

Epithelioma is an abnormal growth of the epithelium, which is the layer of tissue that covers the surfaces of organs and other structures of the body.

== Classification ==
Epitheliomas can be benign growths or malignant carcinomas. They are classified according to the specific type of epithelial cells that are affected.

The most common epitheliomas are basal cell carcinoma and squamous cell carcinoma (skin cancers).

== Treatment ==
Treatment usually involves surgically removing the tumor and affected tissue. Cryosurgery or radiotherapy may also be used.

== Prognosis ==
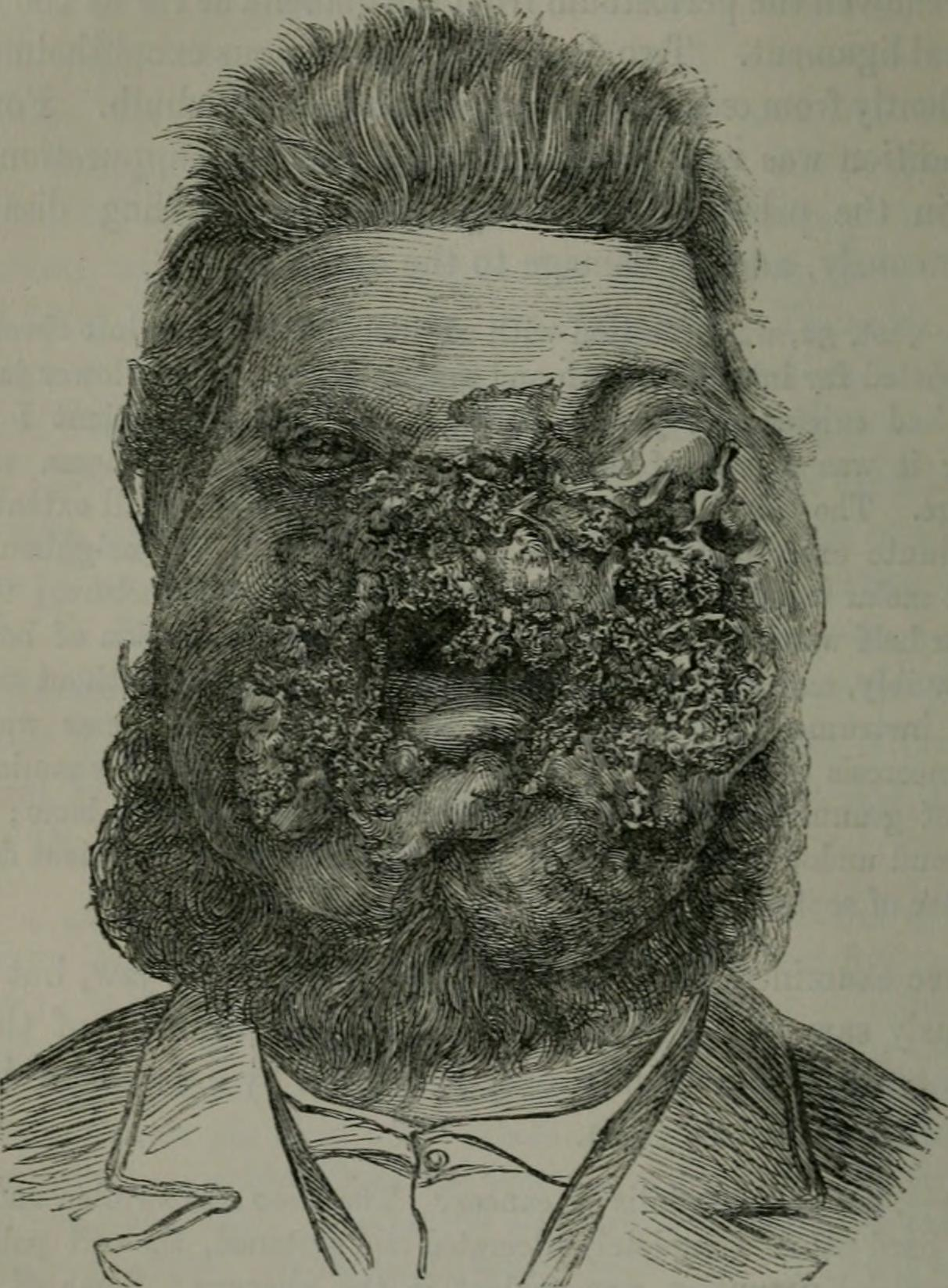
Severe epithelioma, spread over most of the face. This patient died 6 years after developing the condition.

The prognosis varies dramatically, depending on the type and stage at the time of treatment. However, the most common epitheliomas are very easily treated and rarely result in death. The condition did, however, take the life of Scottish golfer Willie Dunn, Sr. in 1878 at a time when the ailment was likely not fully understood.

== See also ==
- Mule spinners' cancer
