= Health Innovation Manchester =

Health Innovation Manchester is an academic health science centre established in October 2017 to drive innovation in healthcare in Greater Manchester. It is closely associated with the Greater Manchester Health and Social Care Partnership.

The Chief Executive is Dr Ben Bridgewater and it is based on the main Manchester University NHS Foundation Trust site.

It has established the Dementia Industry Group, a collaboration with six global pharmaceutical companies.

In November 2018 it announced a £300,000 fund for innovations in the healthcare system in Greater Manchester. It supplied the Women’s Care, Help and Inspire Project in Oldham with AliveCor Kardia mobile electrocardiogram devices, used for the detection of Atrial Fibrillation and trained the members to use them so they could perform tests within the South Asian community in Oldham, where it was thought there were many undiagnosed patients.

It announced a partnership with the Association of British HealthTech Industries, to be known as the Greater Manchester Health Technologies Group in November 2018.

Qiagen moved its European Center of Excellence for Precision Medicine into facilities in the CityLabs 2.0 building in October 2021. The partnership between Manchester University NHS Foundation Trust, the University of Manchester and QIAGEN is focused on the integration of different diagnostic data types (‘omics’), predictive biomarkers for early detection of cancer, and better tests for infectious disease and understanding how the body reacts to infection.
