= Derek Crowther =

British oncologist (1937–2024)

Professor Derek Crowther FRCP, FRCR
- Born: 1 July 1937
- Died: 5 February 2024 (aged 86)
- Education: St Bartholomew's Hospital

Derek Crowther FRCP, FRCR (1 July 1937 – 5 February 2024) was a British oncologist who was a professor emeritus at School of Medical Sciences, University of Manchester.

== Biography ==
Crowther was educated at University of Cambridge and studied medicine at St Bartholomew's Hospital, graduating in 1963.

In 1973, he became the first Professor of Medical Oncology at the Christie Cancer Centre, University of Manchester. He was the second professor of medical oncology in the UK (the first being Gordon Hamilton Fairley). He retired in 1997.

Crowther served as chair of the Leukemia Research Fund Clinical Trials Advisory Panel, and president of the Association of Cancer Physicians.

Crowther was a foundation scholar at Clare College, Cambridge.

Crowther was a member of the United Kingdom government's Gene Therapy Advisory Committee, which first convened in November 1993. In June 2015 he came to public attention, when one of his patients, who had been given six months to live, 40 years earlier, was eighty years old.

In 1999 he was elected to membership of the Manchester Literary and Philosophical Society

Derek Crowther died on 5 February 2024, at the age of 86.
