= The Christie =

- The Christie NHS Foundation Trust
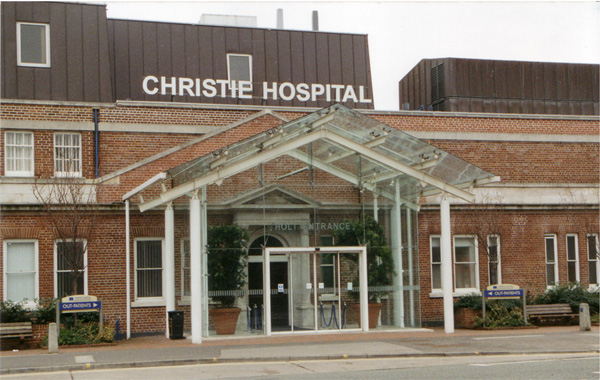
- The Christie's Wilmslow Road entrance

- Shown in Greater Manchester

Geography
- Location: Manchester, England
- Coordinates: 53°25′47″N 2°13′43″W

Organisation
- Care system: NHS
- Type: Specialist

Services
- Speciality: Cancer

History
- Founded: 1892

Links
- Website: www.christie.nhs.uk

The Christie, formerly known as Christie Hospital and The Christie Hospital and Holt Radium Institute, is a specialist National Health Service (NHS) single site cancer centre in Manchester, United Kingdom. The hospital is managed by The Christie NHS Foundation Trust, which as of 2024 had a turnover of £472 million and around 3,500 staff. Its work is supported by The Christie Charity.

The hospital was established in 1890 by Richard Copley Christie, after whom, along with his wife Mary, it is named. Initially situated off Oxford Road in Manchester, the centre moved to a purpose-built facility in Withington in 1932 and became part of the NHS in 1948.

== Treatments and facilities ==
The Christie is the largest single site cancer centre in Europe, and during the 2023–24 period provided 102,000 fractions of radiotherapy and treated more than 60,000 patients. It is the largest radiotherapy provider in the NHS, and similarly contains the largest chemotherapy and brachytherapy units in the UK. The Christie also provides specialist surgery, as well as diagnostic and support services for patients with cancer.

The hospital primarily covers a population of 3.2 million in Greater Manchester and Cheshire, but around a quarter of patients are referred from other areas of the UK for specialist treatment. The Christie delivers radiotherapy at the main site in Withington, as well as at sites in Oldham, Salford, and Macclesfield. Chemotherapy is delivered by The Christie across 14 sites, as well as in patients' homes.

The Christie is part of the Manchester Cancer Research Centre, and the Wolfson Molecular Imaging Centre is located on site, ran by the University of Manchester. The Cancer Research UK Manchester Institute is also located adjacent to the hospital, which is a major research facility linked to both the university and the hospital. In 2010, the Christie School of Oncology was opened, which delivers education to healthcare professionals at all career stages.

In 1998, The Christie opened the Young Oncology Unit, one of the first such Teenage Cancer Trust locations. In 2014, a new Young Oncology Unit was opened, which has 13 beds for 16–24 year olds.

In 2018, The Christie opened the UK's first high energy proton beam therapy centre, where previously patients requiring this treatment had to travel to the USA or Switzerland to access this treatment. By 2024, this centre had planned treatments for 2,000 patients since its commencement.

== History ==
=== Beginnings at Oxford Road (1892–1901) ===
On his death in 1887, Sir Joseph Whitworth bequeathed money that was used to purchase land in Rusholme, where in 1892 the Cancer Pavilion and Home was founded. Owens College (a predecessor of The University of Manchester) had already relocated close to this location, and a number of other hospitals would move to the site over the following years, eventually becoming the Oxford Road Campus where Manchester University NHS Foundation Trust is currently headquartered. Richard Copley Christie, an eminent friend of Whitworth's, served as chairman of the committee overseeing the founding of the Cancer Pavilion. Additional initial financing came from £10,000 donated in the will of Mr Daniel Proctor, and The Christie Charity continues to accept gifts in wills as a large part of its activity. At the time, it was the only hospital outside London dedicated solely to the treatment of cancer.

The centre became known as The Christie Hospital in 1901, after Christie himself had died. By 1928, the hospital was well-established, seeing 374 inpatients and more than 7,000 outpatients who were given radium treatment.

=== Introduction of radium therapy (1901–1932) ===
In 1901, the Christie Management Committee agreed to the request of Dr Robert Biggs Wild to spend £50 on equipment necessary to test the efficacy of X-ray treatment, after promising results were reported from London, and from patients treated by Professor Arthur Schuster at nearby Owens College. The apparatus was purchased, but no records survive of treatment, and by 1907 the equipment was no longer being used (and was given to the Skin Hospital in 1910). By 1905, Dr Wild had become interested in the therapeutic use of radium and experimented, once more with aid from Professor Schuster, on three patients. Radium was expensive, however, and the management refused to purchase any more until the results of tests from London hospitals were available.

By 1914, leading local doctor Sir William Milligan had begun a campaign in the Manchester Guardian to raise funds for radium treatment. Appealing to a mixture of local pride and the contemporary enthusiasm for the curative powers of radium, an appeal was launched on the advice of eminent scientist Ernest Rutherford for £25,000. An initial contribution of £2,000 from Sir Edward Holt was not initially much emulated, but following the intervention of the Lord Mayor, a series of "radium days" were organised which eventually raised enough money to start a small Radium Institute, initially housed at the Manchester Royal Infirmary. In 1921, it moved to new premises in Nelson Street donated by Sir Edward and Lady Holt, and became the Manchester and District Radium Institute. By contrast with the dispersed and competitive provision of London radiotherapy, Manchester became the first provider of a centralised radiotherapy service.

=== The Christie Hospital at Withington (1932–1991) ===
In 1932, the Christie Hospital and the Holt Institute, by then renamed the Holt Radium Institute, moved to a new joint site on Wilmslow Road, Withington and began to be jointly managed (although a formal merger did not occur until 1946). The new site was officially opened by Lord Derby. The Christie became part of the NHS at its advent in 1948.

Ralston Paterson was appointed as Director of the Radium Institute in 1931, and proceeded to build a world-recognised centre for the treatment of cancer by radiation in the following decades. Among his team was wife Edith Paterson, who started research work at the Christie in 1938 (initially unpaid) and who became an expert in radiation biology in her own right. The Paterson Building, named for their contributions, was constructed at the Withington site in 1966.

In 1958, the hospital was the subject of the live BBC programme Your Life In Their Hands, which demonstrated the work of radiotherapy at The Christie Hospital. The programme featured Director of Radiotherapy Ralston Paterson and his colleague Marjorie Pearce. In the episode they showcased an early linear accelerator, and sought to educate the public about radiotherapy. The content and detail of early series of the show generated some controversy amongst the medical community.

Professor Eric Craig Easson CBE became the Director in 1962 following Paterson's retirement, who was also made a professor at the University of Manchester and was President of the Royal College of Radiologists from 1975-1977. He retired in 1979.

=== NHS Trust Era (1991-present) ===
Following changes made in the National Health Service and Community Care Act 1990, The Christie Hospital NHS Trust was formed to manage the hospital, and further legislation led to the eventual creation of The Christie NHS Foundation Trust in 2007.

The first chair of the trust was local businessman Jim Martin, followed by Labour politician Keith Bradley, Baron Bradley in 2011. In 2013 Chief Executive Caroline Shaw CBE was suspended while investigations by NHS Protect were conducted due to allegations that she had made an improper claim for the payment of expenses for a retreat in Ibiza organised by the Young Presidents' Organization, of which she was a member. Still suspended, Shaw eventually resigned her post 11 months later, with Bradley having already resigned in early 2014 during an additional probe into poor governance allegations, conducted by Monitor. Civil servant Sir Hugh Taylor was appointed as the interim chair of the trust, and was replaced later that year by Christine Outram, who served as chair until 2023.

In 2012 it was announced that a new proton therapy centre would be built at the hospital. The machines were delivered in 2017, and the first patients were treated in December 2018.

A large fire significantly damaged the old Paterson Building in 2017, which was replaced by a new £150m Paterson Building in 2024. The building was opened by Sir Paul Nurse, and was attended by the Patersons' descendants.

== Research ==
Early impetuses to research came from new local diseases of industrialisation such as mule spinners' cancer and chimney sweep's cancer, and the search for links to machine oils and airborne soot. Subsequent therapeutic milestones have included:

- 1932 – development of the Manchester Method, the first international standard for radium treatment
- 1944 – world's first clinical trial of diethylstilbestrol (Stilboestrol) for breast cancer
- 1970 – world's first clinical use of tamoxifen (Nolvadex) for breast cancer
- 1986 – world's first use of cultured bone marrow for leukaemia treatment
- 1991 – world's first single harvest blood stem-cell transplant

=== Cancer Research UK Manchester Institute ===
Professor Laszlo Lajtha was appointed director of research in 1962. New research laboratories, provided by the Women's Trust Fund and named after the Patersons, were opened in 1966. The Women's Trust Fund was a local charity, chaired by Lady Margaret Holt, daughter-in-law of Sir Edward Holt, who left her entire estate of more than £8 million to the Christie when she died in 1997. Core funding for the laboratories was secured from the Medical Research Council and the Cancer Research Campaign (CRC; now Cancer Research UK). The CRC also located the CRC Department of Medical Oncology, led by Professor Derek Crowther, at the Paterson.

Lajtha was succeeded as Director in 1983 by Professor David Harnden. Professor Michael Dexter served in the post for a short time before the appointment of Professor Nic Jones as Director in March 1999. Professor Jones stepped down in 2011 and Professor Richard Marais was appointed as the new Director in 2012.

The Paterson Institute for Cancer Research changed its name to the Cancer Research UK Manchester Institute (CRUK MI) on 1 October 2013.

On 26 April 2017 a fire broke out on the institute's roof and rapidly spread through the building, destroying cancer research facilities and leading to the displacement of more than 300 scientists and support staff. A forensic investigation conducted by the Greater Manchester Fire and Rescue Service determined that the most probable cause of the fire was from hot debris from welding work being carried out on the institute roof which landed on cardboard, carpet and other flammable substances. A replacement Paterson Building opened in July 2024.

== The Christie NHS Foundation Trust ==
The Christie NHS Foundation Trust
- Former name: Christie Hospital NHS Foundation Trust; Christie Hospital NHS Trust
- Type: NHS foundation trust
- Established: 1 April 2007
- Headquarters: 550 Wilmslow Road; Withington; Manchester; M20 4BX
- Region served: Greater Manchester; Cheshire; High Peak, Derbyshire
- Hospitals: The Christie hospital
- Chief executive: Roger Spencer
- Website: www.christie.nhs.uk

Dr Kim Holt, chair of the patient safety campaign group Patients First, demanded an independent investigation into claims of bullying, intimidation and dismissal of whistleblowers at the Trust in March 2014. A report by Monitor (NHS) and the CQC concluded there was no evidence of serious failings of governance or widespread cultural issues at the trust. NHS England commissioned a review in 2020 into events at the trust after whistleblowers raised numerous concerns over a research project with pharmaceutical giant Roche. The review, led by Angela Schofield, chair of Harrogate and District NHS Foundation Trust described the trust's research division as "ineffective" and said it had "allowed inappropriate behaviours to continue without challenge". She went on to say "The leadership of The Christie had a number of opportunities to avert this rapid review as colleagues in the R&I division began to speak up about their concerns. Not only did they not seem to recognise this but there were occasions when they appeared to be defensive and dismissive." The board responded by saying "we do not have systematic problems with discrimination, bullying or responding to concerns."

=== Performance ===
It was named by the Health Service Journal as one of the top hundred NHS trusts to work for in 2015. At that time it had 2,313 full-time equivalent staff and a sickness absence rate of 3.41%. 92% of staff recommend it as a place for treatment and 73% recommended it as a place to work. The Care Quality Commission rated it as outstanding in 2016.

In 2018 the trust entered into a partnership arrangement with Hoffmann-La Roche which was intended to involve The Christie providing blood samples from 5,000 patients per year, with the company's subsidiaries, Flatiron Health and Foundation Medicine, building a "clinico-genomic database". Reports into the project found that there was "insufficient due diligence on alternative options" and no formal procurement process. Staff concerns raised at the time were brushed aside as was legal advice that it was "not as clear as we might hope that any research…[carried] out will be for the benefit of the trust at all".

=== Private treatment ===
HCA Healthcare has run a specialist private cancer unit in partnership with the trust since 2010. 20% of the oncologists who work at the Trust have shares in this venture.

== Charity support ==
The hospital is supported by a fundraising charity, The Christie Charitable Funds, trading as The Christie Charity. The charity was initially directly controlled by the Hospital Trust, but in line with changes to the charities acts is now a self-governing charity with independent trustees. The charity exists solely to support services at The Christie which are ineligible for NHS funding, including investing in staff, equipment, facilities, support services and research. In 2023-24 it raised £17.4 million.

The hospital also received charitable support in the form of a Maggie's Centre.

== See also ==
- Healthcare in Greater Manchester
- List of hospitals in England
- List of NHS trusts
