= Tom Riordan =

British civil servant

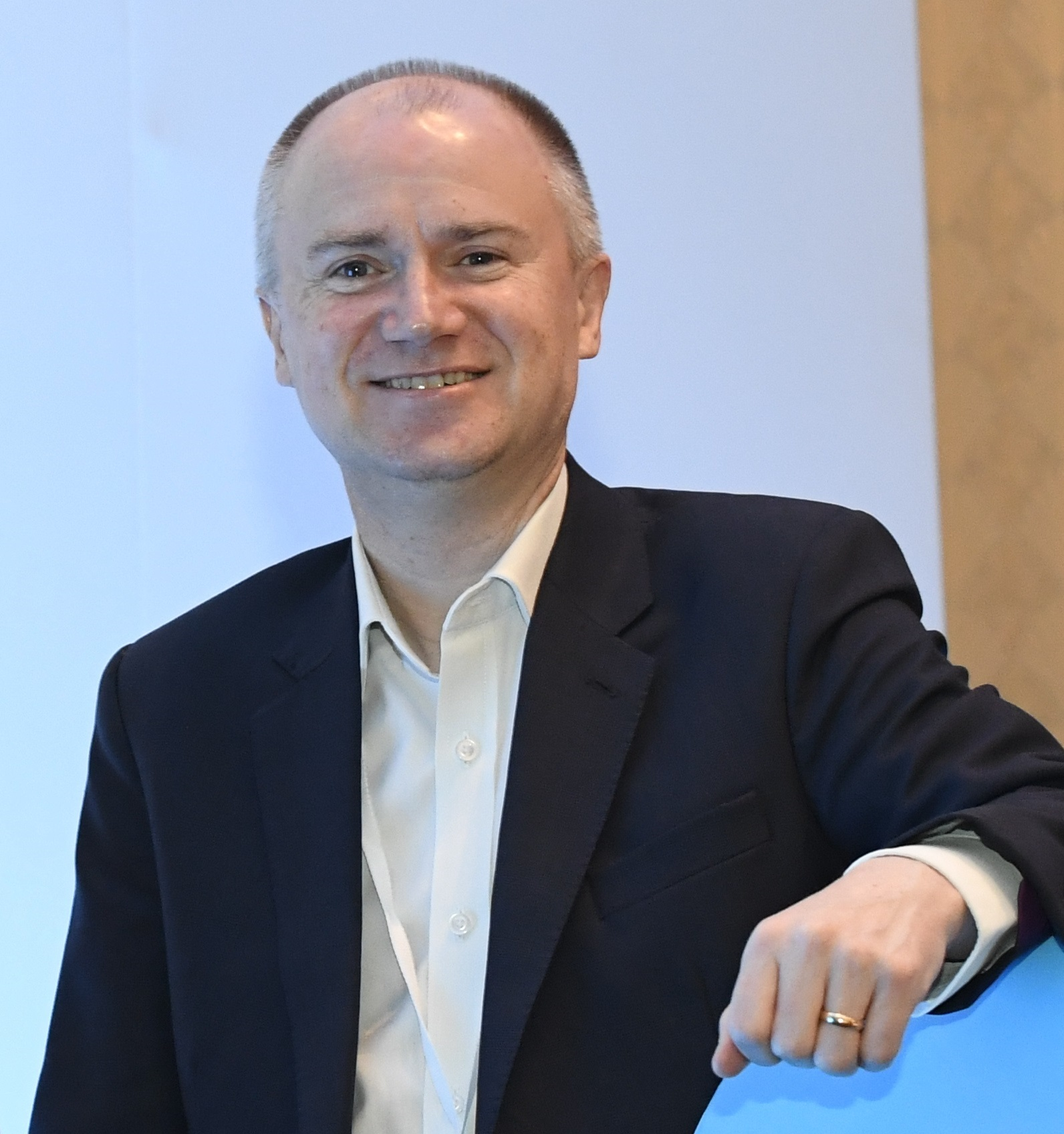
Riordan in 2019

Thomas Messenger Riordan CBE is an English civil servant. Since 2026 he has been Permanent Secretary of the Ministry of Housing, Communities and Local Government. He was Chief Executive of Leeds City Council from August 2010 until September 2024, and spent three months working part-time for the UK government from May 2020 leading the Contain strand within COVID-19 NHS Test and Trace programme, setting out the framework for managing local COVID-19 outbreaks.

== Early life and education ==
Riordan was born and educated in Northallerton, North Yorkshire. He graduated in Modern History from Trinity College, Oxford in 1989. He gained an MBA at Imperial College in 1997. Due to his parents' mental health problems, Riordan spent periods in care before the age of four, thereafter returning home.

== Career ==
Riordan joined the UK civil service 'fast stream' graduate intake in 1990. He then specialised in environmental policy and represented the UK in international negotiations on climate change and endangered species. Riordan moved to Leeds in 1997 and helped set up Yorkshire Forward, the regional development agency for Yorkshire and Humber, becoming its chief executive in 2006, supporting 10,000 businesses during the recession, completing award-winning regeneration developments and pioneering low carbon initiatives.

Riordan was appointed Chief Executive of Leeds City Council in August 2010, and completed a handover period with outgoing chief Paul Rogerson.

In 2021 Riordan was shortlisted alongside Mark Britnell for the role of NHS Chief Executive, which was awarded to Amanda Pritchard.

In May 2020 Riordan agreed to spend three months, part-time, leading the UK government COVID-19 tracing system.

In September 2024, Riordan announced he was leaving his role at Leeds City Council after 14 years to take up a new position at the Department of Health and Social Care as Second Permanent Secretary. From November 2025, he became the Northern Growth Envoy at HM Treasury's Darlington Economic Campus, and in September 2026 was appointed Permanent Secretary of the Ministry of Housing, Communities and Local Government.

== Personal life ==
Riordan is married and has two children. He is a keen footballer and Middlesbrough F.C. supporter. He has experience of mental health issues in his wider family. He was appointed Commander of the Order of the British Empire (CBE) in the 2020 New Year Honours for services to local government.
