= Edith Paterson =

Scottish radiobiologist 1900-1995

- Born: Edith Isabel Myfanwyn Jones; 21 November 1900; Edinburgh
- Died: 27 September 1995 (aged 94); Edinburgh
- Education: University of Edinburgh
- Occupation: radiobiologist
- Spouse: Ralston Paterson

Edith Isabel Paterson born Edith Isabel Myfanwy Jones (21 November 1900 – 27 September 1995) was a Scottish radiobiologist. She developed techniques for treating children with brain tumours. She pioneered cancer research and in 1967 the Paterson Institute for Cancer Research in Manchester was named to recognise her and her husband's contribution.

== Life ==
Paterson was born to Henry and Margaret at 221 Gorgie Road in Edinburgh. Her father was a general practitioner who conducted his visits using a pony and trap. She was educated at the University of Edinburgh where she met Ralston Paterson. They studied together at the school of medicine. She went on to study to be a paediatrician in San Francisco and later at the Washington school of medicine in St Louis. She kept in contact with Ralston who with his sister had caught the same boat to the USA. They married in New York in July 1930 and quickly returned to Scotland where Ralston had accepted a position as head of radiology in Edinburgh Royal Infirmary which he did not like. They moved again in 1931 when he became a "Radium director" in Manchester.

In Manchester she had neither a position or a salary, but she was given a room at the Holt Radium Institute which her husband was reorganising and developing a scientific approach to treating cancer with radiation. She wanted to understand the clinical aspects and she would establish herself as an independent researcher and one of the first radiobiologists. She studied tissue by using chicken embryos developing methods she went to study in Cambridge at the Strangeways Research Laboratory. She worked out the different effects of X-Rays and Gamma Rays on tissue and in time she developed techniques for treating children with medulloblastomas and malignant brain tumours.

During the war she and Ralston consulted in Australia over the arrangement of cancer treatment in the major cities. After the war the Holt institute was merged into the Christie Hospital in Manchester. At that hospital Edith developed her research.

She retired in 1961 and her husband joined her a year later. They became farmers at Stenrieshill Farm, near Moffat in the south west of Scotland for twenty years. They bred livestock. Ralston died in 1981, but Edith worked on until about 1992 when ill health made her move to Edinburgh where she died in 1995. She left a daughter and two sons.

== Legacy ==
In 1967 In 1967 Manchester's new research labs were named the Paterson Laboratories, and later the Paterson Institute for Cancer Research to commemorate the Paterson's achievement.

Edith's contribution was recognised by the politician Fred Silvester in 1986 in the House of Commons during a debate over Christie Hospital in Manchester which he believed was one of the best centres for the treatment of cancer in Europe. Silvester noted that the hospitals position developed from "Cancer research ... pioneered there since the mid-1940s when Dr. Edith Paterson, an expert in radiation biology, was at work."
