= Mark Fisher (civil servant) =

British civil servant

Christopher Mark Fisher CBE FRSA (born 8 October 1960) is a British civil and public servant. He was Director General and Secretary to the Grenfell Tower Inquiry from 2017 to 2021. He was previously Director of the Office for Civil Society at the Cabinet Office and was a Board Director of Jobcentre Plus.

In March 2022, he was appointed chief executive of the Greater Manchester integrated care system. He has not previously worked in the NHS.

On 18 September 2025, He announced his forthcoming retirement.

Fisher was appointed Commander of the Order of the British Empire (CBE) in the 2010 New Year Honours.
