= Ben Bridgewater =

British cardiac surgeon

- Medical career
- Profession: Physician
- Institutions: Health Innovation Manchester
- Sub-specialties: Cardiac surgery

Ben Bridgewater is the Chief Executive of Health Innovation Manchester and became the Executive Chair of the Health Innovation Network in 2025.

== Career ==
Since 2018, Ben has led Health Innovation Manchester as Chief Executive through a period of transformation, securing significant external investment and delivering programmes such as the Greater Manchester Care Record and pioneering work in obesity care. Ben was made Executive Chair of the Health Innovation Network in 2025.

Between January 2016 and February 2018, Ben worked for CSC (which became DXC Technology following a merger with Hewlett Packard Enterprise Services in April 2017), initially as the UK&I Director of Healthcare strategy and then as the Director of the Healthcare and Lifesciences Global Build Advisory team for DXC Technology.

Until January 2016, he was a cardiac surgeon at the University Hospital of South Manchester for nearly 18 years, described by the Health Service Journal judges as "one of the leaders in measuring quality in the NHS".

Bridgewater was a pioneer in opening up data about outcomes in cardiac surgery down to the level of individual surgeons.

Working with the Society for Cardiothoracic Surgery in Great Britain and Ireland, of which he is a leading member, he has helped to devise a system which enables patients waiting for heart surgery to check the track record of cardiac surgeons and their hospitals on-line before their operation. Measuring clinical outcomes in cardiac surgery has led to a 50% reduction in mortality rates over the past 10 years. He has also helped to create a system, working with the Picker Institute Europe to develop a system which makes public online data for all of University Hospital of South Manchester Trust's consultants.

He led the publication of surgeon level activity and mortality outcomes reporting across 13 specialities on behalf of the Healthcare Quality Improvement Partnership 2013-2016 - HQIP Consultant Outcomes and HQIP Clinical Outcomes Technical Manual.

He was a vocal participant in the debate about the Health and Social Care Act 2012.

== Publications ==
- Ben Bridgewater: measuring outcomes for surgery Kings Fund 2011
- Fourth EACTS Adult Cardiac Surgical Database Report: Towards Global Benchmarking (with Peter K. H. Walton, Robin Kinsman and Jan Gummert) 2010
- Sixth National Adult Cardiac Surgical Database Report 2008: Demonstrating Quality (with Sir Bruce Keogh, Robin Kinsman and Peter K. H. Walton) July 2009)
