= Killing of Peter Connelly =

2007 child death in London

- Location: London, England
- Attack type: Child homicide, child abuse
- Victims: Peter Connelly, a.k.a. Baby P
- Perpetrators: Steven Barker; Tracey Connelly; Jason Owen
- Charges: Barker: Murder; Barker, Connelly, Owen: Causing or allowing the death of a child or vulnerable person
- Verdict: Barker not guilty of murder; All guilty of causing or allowing the death of a child or vulnerable person
- Sentence: Barker: Life imprisonment with the possibility of parole after 10 years Connelly: Indefinite imprisonment with a minimum of 5 years (released after 13 years); Owen: Indefinite imprisonment with a minimum of 3 years (released early after 2 years)

Peter Connelly (also known as "Baby P", "Child A", and "Baby Peter", 1 March 2006 – 3 August 2007) was a 17-month-old English boy who was killed in London in 2007 after suffering more than fifty injuries over an eight-month period, during which he was repeatedly seen by the London Borough of Haringey children's services and National Health Service (NHS) health professionals. Baby P's real first name was revealed as "Peter" on the conclusion of a subsequent trial of Peter's mother's boyfriend on a charge of raping a two-year-old. His full identity was revealed when his killers were named after the expiry of a court anonymity order on 10 August 2009.

The case caused shock and concern among the public and in Parliament, partly because of the magnitude of Peter's injuries, and partly because Peter had lived in the London Borough of Haringey, North London, under the same child welfare authorities that failed seven years earlier in the murder of Victoria Climbié, which had been investigated by a public inquiry resulting in measures being put in place in an effort to prevent similar cases.

Peter's mother Tracey Connelly, her partner Steven Barker, and Jason Owen (later revealed to be Barker's brother) were all convicted of causing or allowing the death of a child, Connelly having pleaded guilty to the charge. A court order issued by the High Court in England had prevented the publication of the identity of Baby P; this was lifted on 1 May 2009 by Justice Coleridge. An order sought by Haringey Council to stop publication of the identities of his mother and her boyfriend was granted, but expired on 10 August 2009.

The child protection services of Haringey and other agencies were widely criticised. Following the conviction, three inquiries and a nationwide review of social service care were launched, and the Head of Children's Services at Haringey was removed at the direction of the government minister. Another nationwide review was conducted by Lord Laming into his own recommendations concerning the murder of Victoria Climbié in 2000. The death was also the subject of debate in the House of Commons.

== Biography ==
Peter Connelly
- Born: Peter Connelly; 1 March 2006; London, England
- Died: 3 August 2007 (aged 1 year 5 months); London, England
- Cause of death: Homicide (spinal injury causing internal bleeding)
- Resting place: St Pancras and Islington Cemetery; East Finchley, North London
- Other names: Baby P, Child A, Baby Peter
- Parent: Tracey Connelly

Peter Connelly was born to Tracey Connelly on 1 March 2006. His biological father moved out a few months after his birth, and Connelly's new boyfriend, Steven Barker, moved in with her in November that year. In December 2006, a general practitioner noticed bruises on Peter's face and chest. His mother was arrested and Peter was put into the care of a family friend, but returned home to his mother's care in January 2007. Over the next few months, Peter was admitted to hospital on two occasions suffering from various injuries, including bruising, scratches, and swelling on the side of his head. Connelly was re-arrested in May 2007.

In June 2007, a social worker observed marks on Peter and informed the police. A medical examination concluded that the bruising was the result of child abuse. On 4 June, the toddler was placed into the care of a family friend for safeguarding. On 25 July, Haringey Council's Children & Young People's Service obtained legal advice which indicated that the "threshold for initiating Care Proceedings...was not met".

On 1 August 2007, Peter was seen at St Ann's Hospital in South Tottenham, Haringey, by locum paediatrician Sabah Al-Zayyat. Serious injuries, including a broken back and fractured ribs, very likely went undetected, as the post-mortem report believed these to have pre-dated Al-Zayyat's examination. A day later, Connelly was informed that she would not be prosecuted.

The next day, an ambulance was called, and Peter was found in his cot; blue, lifeless, and clad only in a nappy. After attempts at resuscitation, he was taken to North Middlesex Hospital in Edmonton, Enfield, with his mother, but was pronounced dead at 12:20 p.m. A post-mortem revealed he had swallowed a tooth after being punched. Other injuries included a broken back, broken ribs, mutilated fingertips, and missing fingernails.

The police immediately began a murder investigation and Peter's mother was arrested.

== Trials ==
On 11 November 2008, Owen, 36, and his brother Barker, 32, were found guilty of "causing or allowing the death of a child or vulnerable person". Connelly, 27, had already pleaded guilty to this charge. Earlier in the trial, Owen and Connelly had been cleared of murder due to insufficient evidence. Barker was found not guilty of murder by a jury.

A second trial took place in April 2009, when Connelly and Barker, under aliases, faced charges related to the rape of a two-year-old girl. The girl was also on Haringey's child protection register in 2007, when the abuse took place, and at the age of four, became the youngest witness to testify at the Old Bailey. Cross-examined by lawyers for the couple via video link, she used a doll and a stuffed toy to recreate the events of the incident. Barker was found guilty of rape, while Connelly was found not guilty of child cruelty charges. Their defence lawyers argued that this second trial was nearly undermined by bloggers publishing information linking them to the death of Peter, which could have prejudiced the jury.

Sentencing for both trials together took place on 22 May 2009 at the Old Bailey. Connelly received a sentence of indefinite imprisonment for public protection, subject to a minimum term of five years. Barker was sentenced to life imprisonment for the rape of the young girl, with a minimum sentence of ten years, and a twelve-year sentence for his role in the death of Peter, to run concurrently. Owen was also jailed indefinitely, with a minimum term of three years. The sentences were criticised as too lenient by the NSPCC's chief executive, and the Attorney General considered referring them to the Court of Appeal for review, but concluded that there was "no realistic prospect" of the Court of Appeal increasing the sentences. The three appealed against their sentences, Barker against both convictions and sentences.

Owen's sentence was changed on appeal to a fixed six-year term. He was released in August 2011, but was recalled to prison in April 2013. Connelly was released on licence in 2013, but returned to prison in 2015 for breaching her parole; she became ineligible for review for two years. Connelly was refused parole for a third time in December 2019. In May 2022 it was reported that Connelly would be released from prison. On 7 July 2022, Connelly was given parole, but once again breached her licence conditions and was recalled to prison in September 2024. As of 2024, Barker's most recent application for parole (his fifth one) has been turned down, and he remains in prison.

== Aftermath ==
Haringey Council initiated an internal audit serious case review (SCR) after Peter's death. After completion of the court case, only an executive summary was released to the public. The full report was kept confidential, with only some employees of Haringey Council and Haringey councillors allowed access. The two local MPs whose constituencies cover Haringey (Lynne Featherstone and David Lammy), leader of the opposition Robert Gorrie, and opposition spokesperson for Children's Services, were asked to sign non-disclosure agreements to view the document. Ed Balls condemned the serious case review and called for a second report with an independent adjudicator.

The Mail on Sunday on 15 March 2009 reported that details of the SCR had come into its possession. The article claimed that the executive summary of the SCR either conflicted with or omitted details about how the case had been handled and the extent of the injuries suffered by Peter. Furthermore, there were instances of mishandling by officials, missed and delayed meetings, miscommunication among officials, and a failure to follow through with decisions related to the child's safety. It also noted among other issues that officials had not followed through with obtaining an interim care order that would have removed Peter from his home when they had agreed that legal grounds had existed for doing so six months before he died; key officials also failed to attend a 25 July 2007 meeting intended to decide if it would be necessary to remove Peter from his mother's home at that time.

=== External reports and enquiries ===
Lynne Featherstone MP was critical of Haringey Council, writing, "I personally met with George Meehan and Ita O'Donovan — Haringey Council's leader and chief executive — to raise with them three different cases, where the pattern was in each case Haringey seeming to want to blame anyone who complained rather than to look at the complaint seriously. I was promised action, but despite repeated subsequent requests for news on progress, I was just stonewalled."

Three council workers, including one senior lawyer, were given written warnings about their actions.

The General Medical Council (GMC) separately examined the roles of two doctors: Jerome Ikwueke, a GP, and Sabah Al-Zayyat, a paediatrician who examined Peter two days before his death. Although Ikwueke had twice referred Peter to hospital specialists, the GMC's Interim Orders Panel suspended him for 18 months. Al-Zayyat, who has been accused of failing to spot his injuries, was suspended pending an inquiry in 2008. Her contract with Great Ormond Street Hospital, responsible for child services in Haringey, was also terminated. In 2011 she was removed from the medical register by the GMC, meaning she could no longer practice medicine in the UK. Her removal was requested by Al-Zayyat as a "voluntary erasure", allowing her to be removed without a full hearing.

Ed Balls, Secretary of State for Children, Schools and Families, ordered an external inquiry into Haringey Council Social Services. The inquiry was not to examine the 'Baby P' case explicitly, but to look into whether Haringey Social Services were following correct procedures in general. This report was presented to ministers on 1 December 2008. During a press conference that day, the Minister announced that, in an unusual move, he had used special powers to remove Sharon Shoesmith from her post as head of children's services at Haringey Council. She rejected calls for her resignation, saying that she wanted to continue to support her staff during the investigations, but was dismissed on 8 December 2008 by Haringey Council, without any compensation package. Shoesmith later brought legal proceedings against Ed Balls, Ofsted, and Haringey Council, claiming that the decisions which led to her dismissal were unfair. The High Court dismissed this claim in April 2010, although Shoesmith was still entitled to pursue an action for unfair dismissal in an employment tribunal. In May 2011, Shoesmith's appeal against her dismissal succeeded in the Court of Appeal; the Department of Education and Haringey Council said they intended to appeal to the Supreme Court against this decision. Their applications for leave to appeal to the Supreme Court were refused on 1 August 2011. It was reported by BBC News on 29 October 2013 that Sharon Shoesmith agreed to a six-figure payout for unfair dismissal.

Also announced on 1 December 2008 were the resignations of Labour Council leader George Meehan and councillor Liz Santry, cabinet member for Children and Young People. These councillors had previously refused calls for their resignation during a 24 November council meeting. In April 2009, the council announced that its deputy director of children's services, two other managers, and a social worker, who had been suspended pending an enquiry, had also all been dismissed.

Three further inquires were also ordered:

- The role of all agencies involved in Peter Connelly's case, including the health authority, police and Haringey Council, would be reviewed.
- The General Social Care Council would look into potential breaches of its code of practice.
- Lord Laming would conduct a nationwide review of his own recommendations after the Victoria Climbié inquiry.

Through a lawyer acting on her behalf, a former social worker for Haringey, Nevres Kemal, sent a letter to the secretary of the Department of Health, Patricia Hewitt, in February 2007, six months before Peter's death. The letter contained an allegation that child protection procedures were not being followed in Haringey. Hewitt took no action, except to forward the letter to the DES, now the Department for Children, Schools and Families (DCSF). Haringey Council then took out an injunction against Kemal, banning her from speaking about child care in Haringey. Kemal's lawyer stated, "Hewitt bounced us onto the DES... the DES then advised us to write to the Commission for Social Care Inspection whom we had written to on the same day as we had written to Hewitt, copying in the letter to Hewitt and the relevant material. By that time of course they had an injunction against us so we couldn't go back to the inspectorate. The inspectorate had been properly advised at the time and had done nothing."

Kim Holt, a consultant paediatrician, who worked in a clinic run by Great Ormond Street Children's Hospital at St Ann's Hospital in Haringey, north London, said she and three colleagues wrote an open letter detailing problems at the clinic in 2006. She claimed Peter could have been saved if managers had listened to fears raised by senior doctors.

== Report by Lord Laming ==
Lord Laming published his report, "The Protection of Children in England: A Progress Report" on 12 March 2009. It stated that too many authorities had failed to adopt reforms introduced following his previous review into welfare following the murder of Victoria Climbié in 2000.

== Libel action by biological father ==
On 5 March 2012, Peter's biological father was awarded £75,000 in damages after The People wrongly stated in its 19 September 2010 edition that he was a convicted sex offender. Lawyers for the man, known only as "KC", said that the publishers of The People were guilty of "one of the gravest libels imaginable". Publishers MGN had previously apologised and offered to pay damages.

== Survey concerning recurrence ==
In September 2015, in a survey of 751 health visitors polled by the Community Practitioners and Health Visitors Association, 47% thought it was somewhat likely or very likely that a similar death would recur.

== See also ==
- Filicide
- Louise Porton – British mother who killed her two children in 2018

=== Similar cases ===
- Murder of Nubia Barahona
- Murder of Nixzmary Brown
- Murder of Anjelica Castillo
- Murder of Daniel Pelka
- Murder of Bobby Äikiä
- Death of Lisa Steinberg
