= Kim Holt =

British paediatrician

Kim Holt is a British paediatrician at one time employed by Great Ormond Street Hospital. She founded Patients First after the Death of Baby P scandal, in order to support whistleblowers in the National Health Service.

== Early life ==
She was born in Coventry but grew up in Guernsey, where her father Raymond Fensome and mother Dorothy ran a guest house. She trained at St Bartholomew's Hospital. Her first job was at the Royal Manchester Children's Hospital. Kim married David Holt in 1981. She has four children.

== Whistleblowing ==
She was the designated doctor for children in care at St Ann's Hospital in Haringey. In 2007, she and three other doctors wrote to the management of Great Ormond Street Hospital for Children NHS Foundation Trust, which ran the clinic, warning that staff shortages and poor record-keeping would lead to a tragedy. She then spent four years on special leave from 2007 to 2011 until eventually the hospital management apologised and reinstated her.

In 2011 she founded Patients First which works to protect whistleblowers in the NHS.

Since 2011, she has worked at Whittington Hospital. In 2013 she was voted among the most inspirational women in healthcare.
