= Academic medical centre =

Medical school affiliated with a teaching hospital

An academic medical centre (AMC; variously also known as academic health science centre, academic health science system, or academic health science partnership) is an educational and healthcare institute formed by a medical school with an affiliated teaching hospital or hospital network.

AMCs are intended to ensure that medical research breakthroughs lead to direct clinical benefits for patients. The organisational structures that comprise an AMCs can take a variety of forms, ranging from simple partnerships to, less frequently, fully integrated organisations with a single management board. There are AMCs operating in a number of countries including Australia, Canada, Ireland, Japan, the Netherlands, Qatar, Singapore, Sweden, the United Kingdom and the United States.

== Australia ==
- Health Translation Queensland (Brisbane, Australia)
- Melbourne Academic Centre for Health (Melbourne, Australia)]
- Monash Partners Academic Health Science Centre (Melbourne, Australia)
- South Australian Academic Health Science and Translation Centre (Adelaide, Australia)
- Sydney Health Partners (Sydney, Australia)
- Sydney Partnership for Health, Education, Research & Enterprise (Sydney, Australia)
- Western Australian Health Translation Network (Perth, Australia)
- Tropical Australian Academic Health Centre (North Queensland, Australia)

== Canada ==
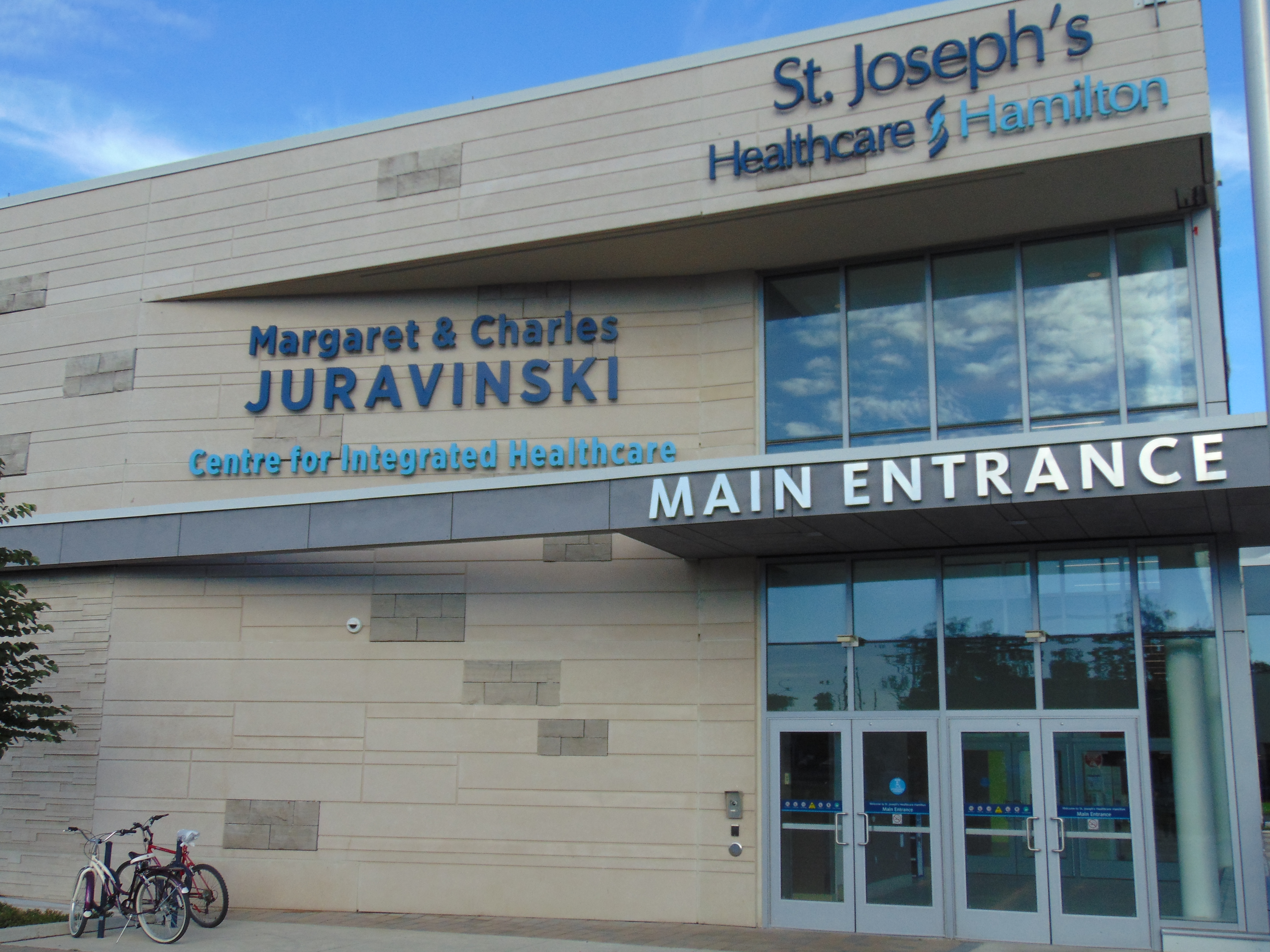
St. Joseph's Healthcare Hamilton in Hamilton, Ontario

- Hamilton Health Sciences (Hamilton, Ontario)
- St. Joseph's Healthcare Hamilton (Hamilton, Ontario)
- Health Sciences North (Sudbury, Ontario)
- Kingston Health Sciences Centre (Kingston, Ontario)
- London Health Sciences Centre (London, Ontario)
- McGill University Health Centre (Montreal, Quebec)
- Centre Hospitalier de l'Université de Montréal (Montreal, Quebec)
- Sunnybrook Health Sciences Centre (Toronto, Ontario)
- The Ottawa Hospital (Ottawa, Ontario)
- Thunder Bay Regional Health Sciences Centre (Thunder Bay, Ontario)
- Trillium Health Partners (Mississauga, Ontario)
- University Health Network (Toronto, Ontario)
- Unity Health Toronto (Toronto, Ontario)
- Vancouver Hospital and Health Sciences Centre (Vancouver, British Columbia)
- Winnipeg Health Sciences Centre (Winnipeg, Manitoba)

== United Kingdom ==
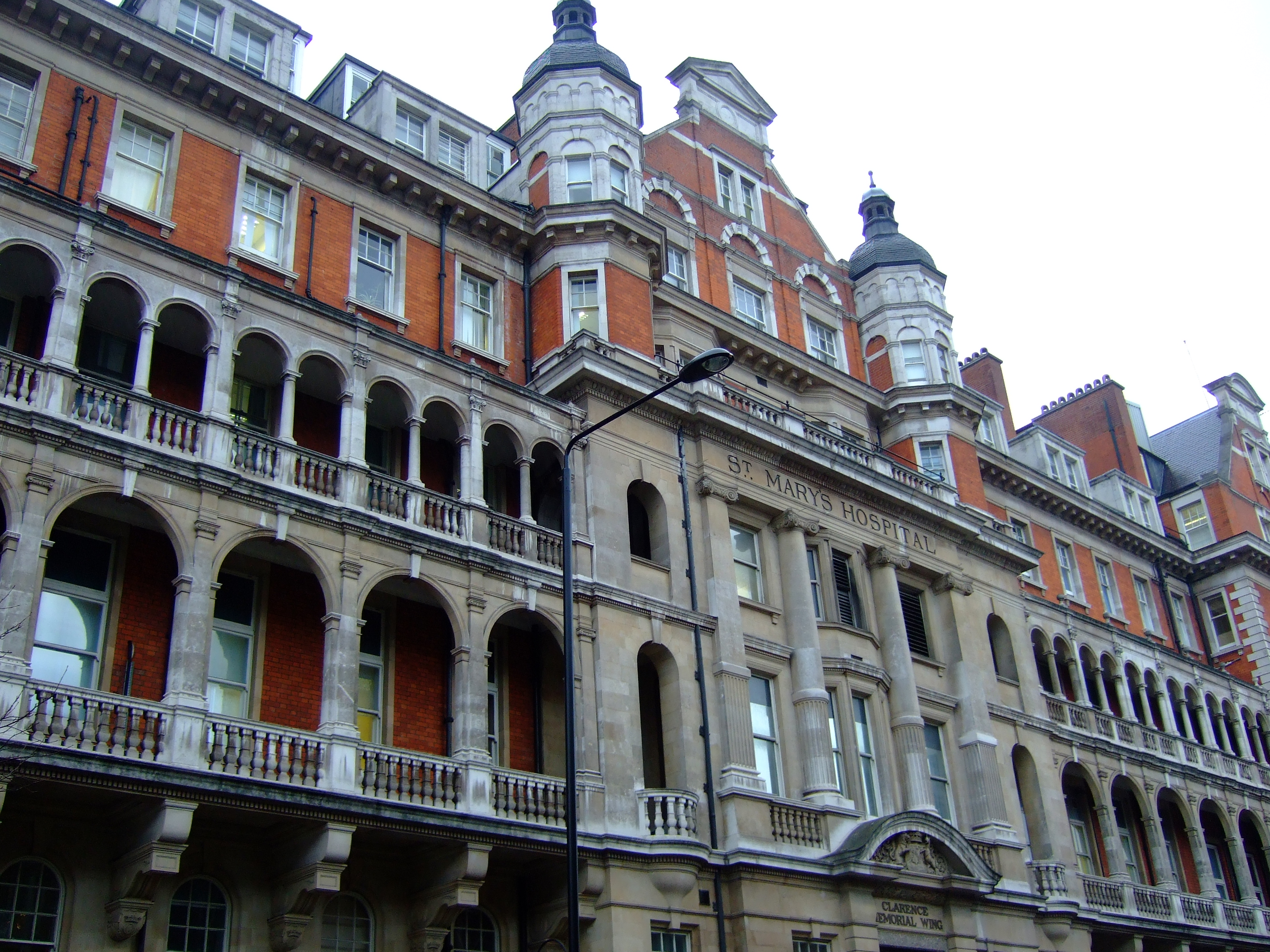
St Mary's Hospital in London, part of Imperial College Healthcare

- Bristol Health Partners, Bristol
- Cambridge University Health Partners, Cambridge
- Imperial College Academic Health Science Centre, London
- King's Health Partners, London
- Manchester Academic Health Science Centre, Manchester
- Newcastle Health Innovation Partners, Newcastle upon Tyne
- Oxford Academic Health Partners, Oxford
- South East Wales Academic Health Science Partnership, Cardiff
- UCLPartners, London

== United States ==
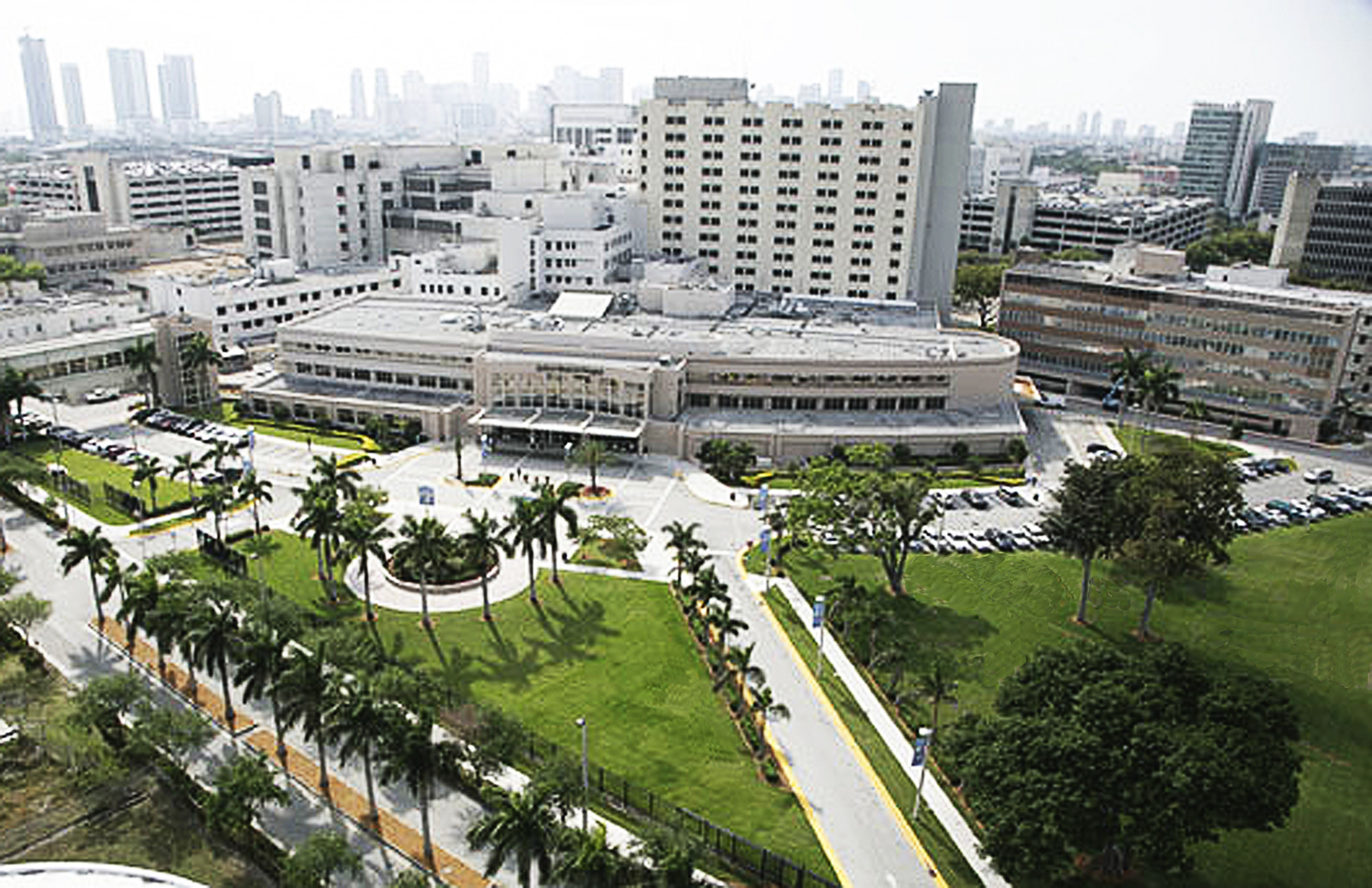
Jackson Memorial Hospital in Miami, the primary teaching hospital of the Miller School of Medicine at the University of Miami and the largest hospital in the United States with 1,547 beds

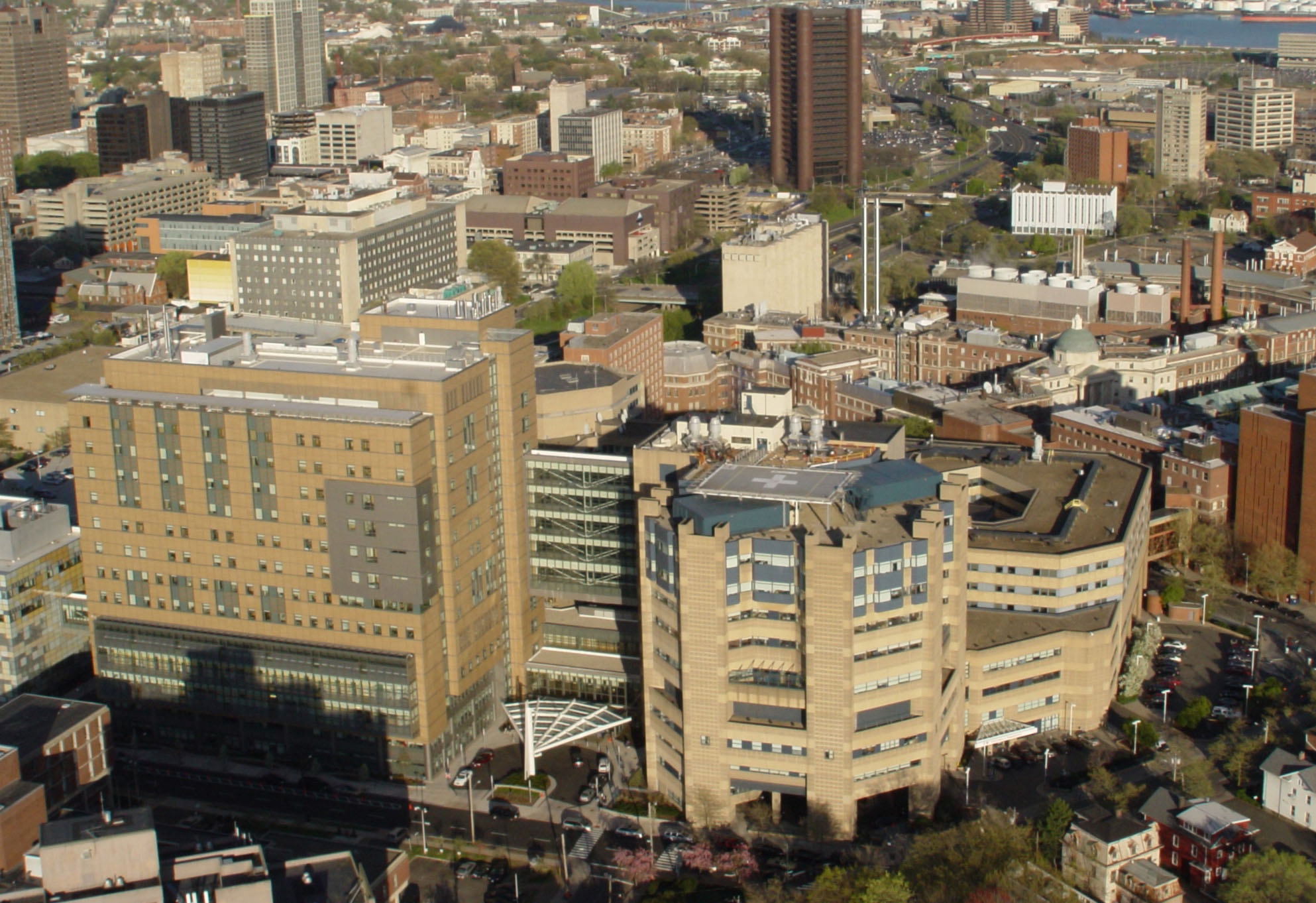
Yale New Haven Hospital campus in New Haven, Connecticut

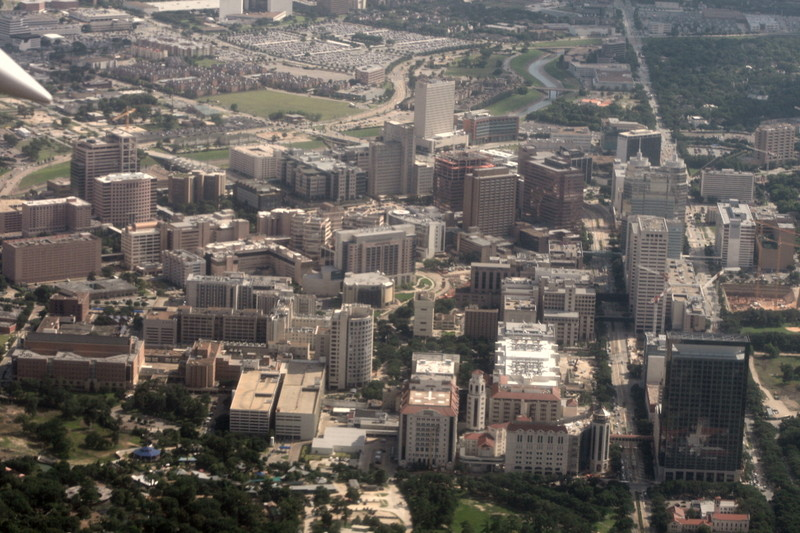
An aerial view of Texas Medical Center in Houston

- Albany Medical Center, Albany Medical College, Albany, New York
- Anschutz Medical Campus, University of Colorado School of Medicine, Aurora, Colorado
- BJC HealthCare, St. Louis, Missouri
- Boston Medical Center, Boston University, Boston, Massachusetts
- Cedars-Sinai Medical Center, Los Angeles, California
- Cleveland Clinic, Cleveland Clinic Lerner College of Medicine, Cleveland, Ohio
- Dartmouth-Hitchcock Medical Center, Geisel School of Medicine, Lebanon, New Hampshire
- Duke University Medical Center (Durham, North Carolina)
- Geisinger Medical Center (Danville, Pennsylvania)
- Georgetown University Medical Center (Washington, D.C.)
- Intermountain Medical Center (Salt Lake City, Utah)
- Johns Hopkins Hospital (Baltimore, Maryland)
- Keck Hospital of USC (Los Angeles, California)
- Loma Linda University Health (Loma Linda, California)
- Massachusetts General Hospital, Brigham and Women's Hospital, and Beth Israel Deaconess Medical Center, Harvard Medical School (Boston, Massachusetts)
- Mayo Clinic, Mayo Clinic College of Medicine and Science (Rochester, Minnesota)
- Medical University of South Carolina, Charleston, South Carolina
- Memorial Medical Center and St. John's Hospital (Springfield, Illinois)
- National Academy of Medicine
- National Institutes of Health
- New York–Presbyterian Hospital, Columbia University and Cornell University, New York City
- NYU Langone Medical Center, New York University, New York City
- Ohio State University Wexner Medical Center, Ohio State University (Columbus, Ohio)
- Oregon Health & Science University, (Portland, Oregon)
- OSF Saint Francis Medical Center and the Children's Hospital of Illinois (Peoria, Illinois)
- Providence Alaska Medical Center (Anchorage, Alaska)
- Robert Wood Johnson University Hospital, Robert Wood Johnson Medical School (New Brunswick, New Jersey)
- Stony Brook University Hospital, Stony Brook University- State University of New York, Stony Brook, New York
- SUNY Downstate Medical Center, SUNY Downstate Health Sciences University, Brooklyn, New York City
- Temple University Hospital, Temple University (Philadelphia, Pennsylvania)
- Texas Medical Center (Houston, Texas)
- Texas Tech University Health Sciences Center (Lubbock, Texas)
- Texas Tech University Health Sciences Center El Paso (El Paso, Texas)
- Thomas Jefferson University Hospital, Thomas Jefferson University (Philadelphia, Pennsylvania)
- Tufts Medical Center (Boston, Massachusetts)
- UC Davis Medical Center (Sacramento, California)
- UC Irvine Medical Center (Orange, California)
- UCLA Health System (Los Angeles, California)
- UC San Diego Health (La Jolla, California)
- UCSF Medical Center (San Francisco, California)
- Uniformed Services University, (Bethesda, Maryland)
- University of Alabama at Birmingham, Alabama
- University of Chicago Medical Center, University of Chicago, Chicago, Illinois
- University of Connecticut Health Center, University of Connecticut, Farmington, Connecticut
- University of Cincinnati Medical Center (Cincinnati, Ohio)
- University of Florida Health (UF Health) (Gainesville and Jacksonville, Florida)
- University Hospitals Cleveland Medical Center (Cleveland, Ohio)
- University of Kentucky HealthCare (Lexington, Kentucky)
- University of Louisville Health Science Center (Louisville, Kentucky)
- University of Miami Health System (UHealth) (Miami, Florida)
- University of Michigan Health System, University of Michigan, Ann Arbor, Michigan
- University of Mississippi Medical Center, Mississippi
- University of North Carolina Hospitals (Chapel Hill, North Carolina)
- University of Pennsylvania Health System, (Philadelphia, Pennsylvania)
- University of Pittsburgh Medical Center, Pittsburgh, Pennsylvania
- University of Tennessee Health Science Center (Memphis, Tennessee)
- University of Texas Medical Branch (Galveston, Texas)
- University of Texas Southwestern Medical Center (Dallas, Texas)
- University of Utah Hospital, University of Utah (Salt Lake City, Utah)
- University of Vermont Medical Center, University of Vermont (Burlington, Vermont)
- University of Virginia Health System, Charlottesville, Virginia
- University of Wisconsin Hospital and Clinics, Madison, Wisconsin
- Upstate University Hospital, Norton College of Medicine – State University of New York (Syracuse, New York)
- UW Medicine, University of Washington (Seattle, Washington)
- Vanderbilt University Medical Center, Nashville, Tennessee
- Vidant Medical Center, Brody School of Medicine at East Carolina University (Greenville, North Carolina)
- VCU Medical Center, Virginia Commonwealth University, Richmond, Virginia
- Wake Forest Baptist Medical Center, Winston-Salem, North Carolina
- Westchester Medical Center, Valhalla, New York
- Yale-New Haven Hospital, Yale University, New Haven, Connecticut

== Other countries ==
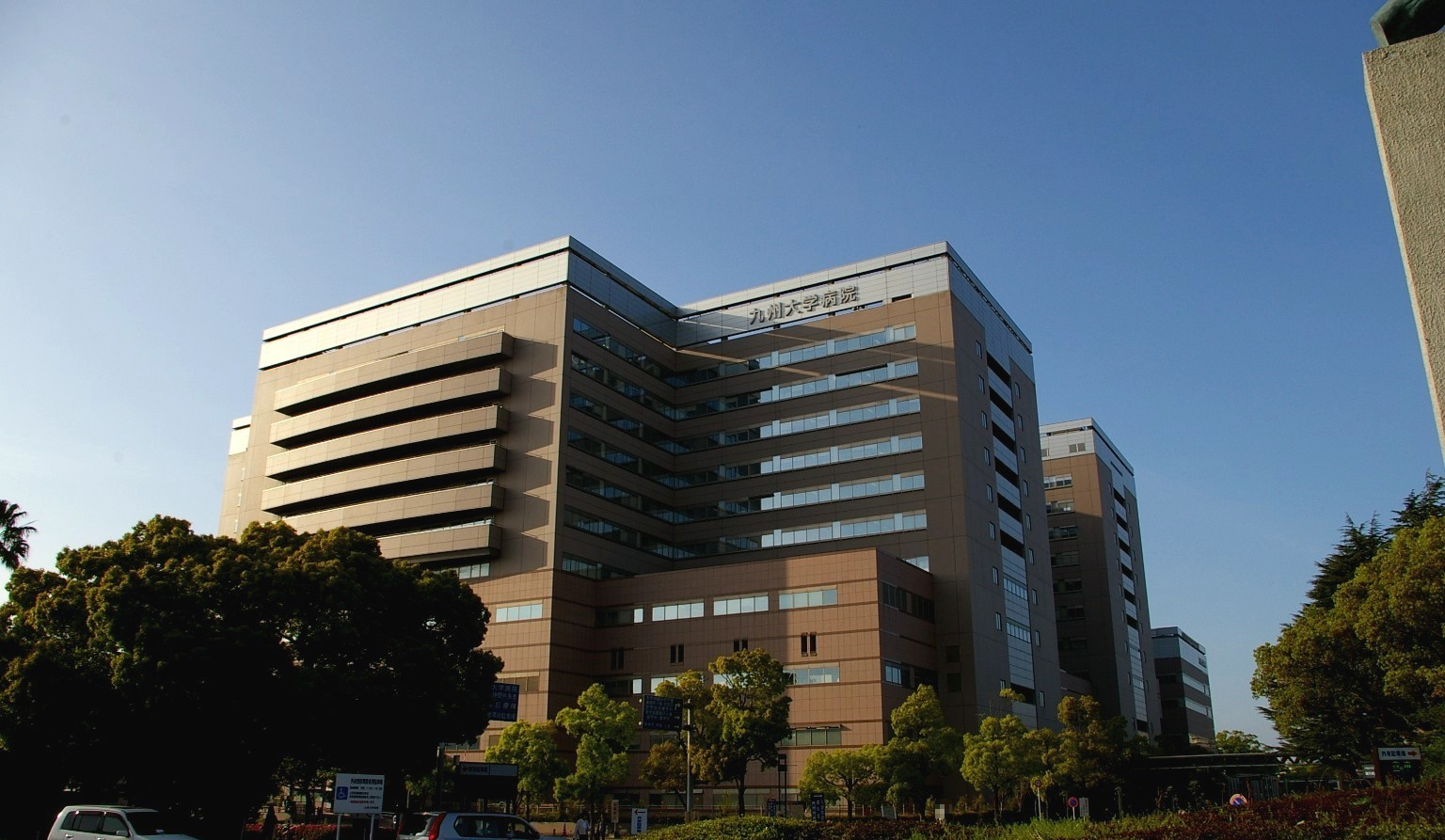
Kyushu University Academic Medical Center

- Academic Health System Universitas Indonesia (Jakarta, Indonesia)
- Academic Health System Universitas Gadjah Mada (Yogyakarta, Indonesia)
- Kyushu University Academic Medical Center (Fukuoka, Japan)
- Dublin Academic Medical Centre (Dublin, Ireland)
- Hamad Medical Corporation (Doha, Qatar)
- Karolinska Institutet (Stockholm, Sweden)
- Leiden University Medical Center (Leiden, the Netherlands)
- National University Health System (Singapore)
- Radboud University Nijmegen Medical Centre (Nijmegen, the Netherlands)
- SingHealth Duke-NUS Academic Medical Center, Singapore

== See also ==
- List of university hospitals
- Medical school
- Teaching hospital
