= Association of British HealthTech Industries =

The Association of British HealthTech Industries, formerly the Association of British Healthcare Industries is a trade association for the medical technology sector in the UK. It has about 250 member companies which together provide 80% of the medical technology used in the NHS. It has offices in London. Members include the UK operations of multinational companies.

== History ==
Formed through the 1988 merger of the British Healthcare Trades and Industry Council & British Healthcare Exports Council, the association's early work focused on the development of the Medical Devices Directives (MDD).

In 2004, ABHI co-authored a Health Insurance Task Force (HITF) report, which set out the foundation for future strategic relationships between NHS, government and industry. A year later the association submitted its first major contribution to House of Commons Health Select Committee report: "Use of new Medical Technologies within the NHS".

In 2007, ABHI co-founded the Ministerial Medical Technology Strategy Group, as a HITF recommendation to embed strategic dialogue with government and the following year published its Code of Business Practice, creating mandatory high standards for ethical compliance and professional business conduct in the industry. In 2013 the Code was opened up to non-members.

In 2017 the association produced its fourth election manifesto which highlighted a set of key government asks to ensure a thriving medical technology sector. In August 2017 it complained that NHS England's Commissioning Through Evaluation project was dysfunctional, damaged the reputation of the UK and prevent patients from benefiting from innovative treatment.

In 2022 the association organised the first ABHI UK Pavilion Presentation Theatre at the MEDICA Trade Fair 2022 with the Department for International Trade, the Welsh Government and the law firm Sidley Austin.

== Membership ==
Membership falls into four categories:

- Corporate Membership: For manufacturers, distributors and organisations who provide non-pharmaceutical healthcare products and services. The subscription fee is based on turnover from UK operations.
- Professional Associate Membership: For members of other professions or professional bodies who fall outside of the corporate membership eligibility. This includes organisations involved in law, medicine, financial services, communications, consultancy and insurance.
- Industry Association Membership: For trade associations in the healthcare industry and related fields.
- International Membership: For non-UK domiciled healthcare companies looking to better navigate the UK market.

Functions

The association represents the views of the medical technology sector to government and decision makers in the UK. It focuses on four areas:

- Investment and growth
- Value not price
- Health systems
- Reputation
