= Murder of Sara Sharif =

2023 homicide in England

Sara Sharif
- Born: 11 January 2013; Slough, Berkshire, England
- Died: 8 August 2023 (aged 10); Woking, Surrey, England
- Body discovered: 10 August 2023
- Parents: Urfan Sharif (father); Olga Domin (mother)
- Relatives: Faisal Malik (uncle); Beinash Batool (stepmother)

Sara Sharif, aged 10, was murdered by her father Urfan Sharif and stepmother Beinash Batool on 8 August 2023. Her body was discovered in her family's residence in Woking, Surrey, England, two days later. An autopsy revealed that she had been regularly and severely abused. Urfan and Beinash, and Urfan's brother, Faisal Malik, fled to Pakistan on 9 August. Upon arriving, Urfan called Surrey police and reported Sara's death. After an international manhunt was launched, the three were arrested on 13 September at Gatwick Airport after voluntarily flying back to the UK.

On 11 December 2024, Urfan and Beinash were found guilty of murder and sentenced to life imprisonment. Faisal was found guilty of causing or allowing the death of a child and was sentenced to 16 years. On 1 January 2025, Urfan was attacked in prison, sustaining injuries to his face and neck. In January 2025, the Solicitor General's office referred the case to the Court of Appeal, requesting an increase in Urfan's sentence under the Unduly Lenient Sentence Scheme, while Urfan and Beinash petitioned the Court of Appeal for a reduction in their sentences; both appeals were denied.

Sara's murder was widely reported for severity of the abuse she had endured, raising questions of why authorities had failed to protect her. The prime minister Keir Starmer commented, calling the case "awful" and said that the government would learn from her death. Will Forster, representing Woking in Parliament, proposed an amendment to the Children's Wellbeing and Schools Bill titled "Sara's Law", which would facilitate increased communication between social services and schools.

== Background ==
Sara's father is Urfan Sharif, a Pakistani taxi driver who moved in 2001 to the UK from Jhelum, Pakistan. Urfan studied at the Army Public School in Jhelum, where a fellow student described him as nearly friendless, prone to "misbehav[ing]", and having "different moods" that were difficult to understand. Urfan's former partner, Angelika, said that he accused her of having an abortion after she suffered a miscarriage, threatened her with a knife, attempted to brand her with his initials, and held her captive in his flat. After escaping, she reported Urfan to the police, and he was detained for two days. The two had met when Urfan was her shift manager at a Burger King restaurant in Woking. After they separated, Angelika returned to Poland. Another Polish former partner of Urfan's, Anna, accused him of imprisoning her for five days.

Sara's mother, Olga Domin (formerly Sharif), is Polish. Urfan allegedly met her during a trip to Poland to stalk Angelika. Olga has learning difficulties and was considered "vulnerable" by authorities. Urfan impressed Olga's relatives during a visit to Poland, and her father said that he had "never seen a better family", but later said that Urfan was a "great manipulator". Her stepmother said that she initially thought that he was a "handsome and well-dressed and car[ed] about his appearance", but later compared him to Tulipan, a Polish serial fraudster famous for seducing and stealing from women.

Olga and Urfan married in 2009 and had a son in 2010. One year into the marriage, Urfan was arrested for assaulting Olga and an unspecified child. Olga allegedly told social services that Urfan tightened a belt around her neck, locked her in a room, and took her phone. She also said that he once tried to set her on fire and poured oil on her, but was stopped by her cousin. Olga's mother said that she knew that Olga was being abused, but did not confront Urfan, fearing that it would worsen it.

Sara Sharif was born on 11 January 2013 in Slough, Berkshire. Sara was put under a child protection plan as soon as she was born due to concerns that she was at risk of harm from both her parents. After a week with her mother in hospital, the newborn Sara was placed into foster care, with parental visitation allowed three times a week; she was returned to her parents under supervision in September 2013. The couple separated in 2015 and later divorced; both children lived with Olga. Urfan then eloped with Beinash Batool, 12 years his junior, resulting in her family cutting off contact and her father disowning her. Beinash had previously been subjected to "honour-based" abuse and lived in a shelter as a teenager. Urfan allegedly acquired her phone number from a shopkeeper at Woking railway station; he said that they had met in his taxi.

In 2019, Urfan received custody of the children, and they lived in Horsell, Woking, with him, Beinash, the couple's children, and Urfan's brother. Olga said that the reason that she lost custody was that Sara falsely claimed that Olga had hit her.

== Abuse ==
In September 2013, Olga was arrested for biting one of her children, was charged and released on bail. She claimed that it happened while they were playing, but said in 2014 that she did it deliberately and was given a police caution. In 2015, social services investigated the family after Urfan was seen gesturing with a knife in his home, which he claimed was part of a "zombie game". Social workers also observed Urfan assaulting Olga and them making death threats against one other.

Olga, who objected to her children being raised Muslim, had little contact with her children during the time in Woking. She initially was allowed to see them often, but her visits became rarer after Beinash told her not to visit, claiming the children did not desire to see her. According to Olga, "[i]t's not normal that once the children were happy, and arguing about who would talk to Mum first, and then the kids don't even want to talk to me on the phone and are calling me the worst names."

A social worker that supervised visits between Urfan and Sara said that Sara shouted at Urfan to "go away" whenever he came close, and another social worker said that she thought Urfan lacked empathy. One of Urfan's children told a social worker that they disliked their father because he assaulted and bruised them. Another social worker reported that Sara flinched when Urfan scolded her and that she was visibly surprised when Urfan embraced her.

Sara was forced to carry out domestic chores for Urfan and Beinash – a neighbour told Sky News that Sara was treated as "a bit of a servant" by the pair. Neighbours told a jury that they had regularly heard Beinash verbally abuse Sara and call Urfan at work to come home to punish Sara. Beinash justified the abuse as punishment for Sara's "naughty behaviour" and said that it was caused by jinn possession. Sara was beaten regularly and was tied up with tape with her head covered with a "makeshift hood". Urfan once forced Sara to perform sit-ups the entire night because she had hidden his keys.

Sara began wearing a hijab at school to cover her bruises and gave multiple conflicting stories about her injuries. After she could not explain them to her teachers, the school referred Sara to social services. Urfan said to a social worker that Sara had "lots of marks because of the machinery she was hooked up to when born prematurely," which she was not. In April 2023, the Sharifs took Sara out of primary school under the guise of being home schooled. A neighbour reported that she heard "constant crying" and "screaming", which had reached "fever pitch". She also said that Beinash turned her away after she visited out of concern for the family's welfare. Another neighbour said that she heard a young girl scream "in pain" two days before Sara died.

== Discovery of the body and investigation ==
On the day of Sara's death, 8 August 2023, Sara's older brother sent a friend a text message stating that his sister had died. The same day, Beinash called a travel agency about aeroplane tickets to Pakistan, but the call ended without tickets booked. An hour later, Urfan messaged ad hoc travel agent Nadeem Riaz, asking for eight one-way aeroplane tickets to Islamabad, Pakistan. Urfan claimed that his cousin had died. Riaz said that he had known Urfan for 11 years prior to the message, and that he did not notice anything unusual.

Urfan Sharif, his wife Beinash Batool, and his brother Faisal Malik departed from the UK for Islamabad on 9 August, a day before Sara's body was found. Urfan made a 999 call from Pakistan in the early morning of 10 August – shortly after he arrived in Islamabad. He admitted, "I've killed my daughter", stating, "It wasn't my intention to kill her, but I beat her up too much." He told the dispatcher that his actions were intended as punishment, saying, "I'm a cruel father." Shortly after the end of the call, Sara's body was discovered at her residence on Hammond Road, Horsell by a police constable. Urfan left a note addressed to Sara near her body, apologising for her death and asking that she be buried in accordance with Islamic funeral traditions. Surrey Police identified Urfan, Beinash and Faisal as persons of interest.

On 15 August 2023, a post-mortem examination discovered that Sara had suffered numerous and severe injuries over an extended period.

== International manhunt ==
Despite the lack of an extradition treaty between the United Kingdom and Pakistan, an international search was launched in Jhelum. Surrey Police requested information two weeks after the discovery of Sara's body, urging anyone who had contact with her to come forward. Muhammad Sharif, Urfan's father, said that Urfan had visited him in Jhelum while fleeing and that Urfan told him that Sara's death was accidental. According to Muhammad, Urfan was hiding out of fear and added that Urfan was likely not "think[ing] properly".

On 12 September 2023, police raided Muhammad's house in Jhelum, and recovered Urfan's five living children in good condition. The Pakistani government then assumed custody over the children. On 13 September, Urfan, Beinash, and Faisal were arrested at Gatwick Airport on suspicion of murder after disembarking a flight from Sialkot via Dubai. They had voluntarily returned to the UK.

== Trial ==
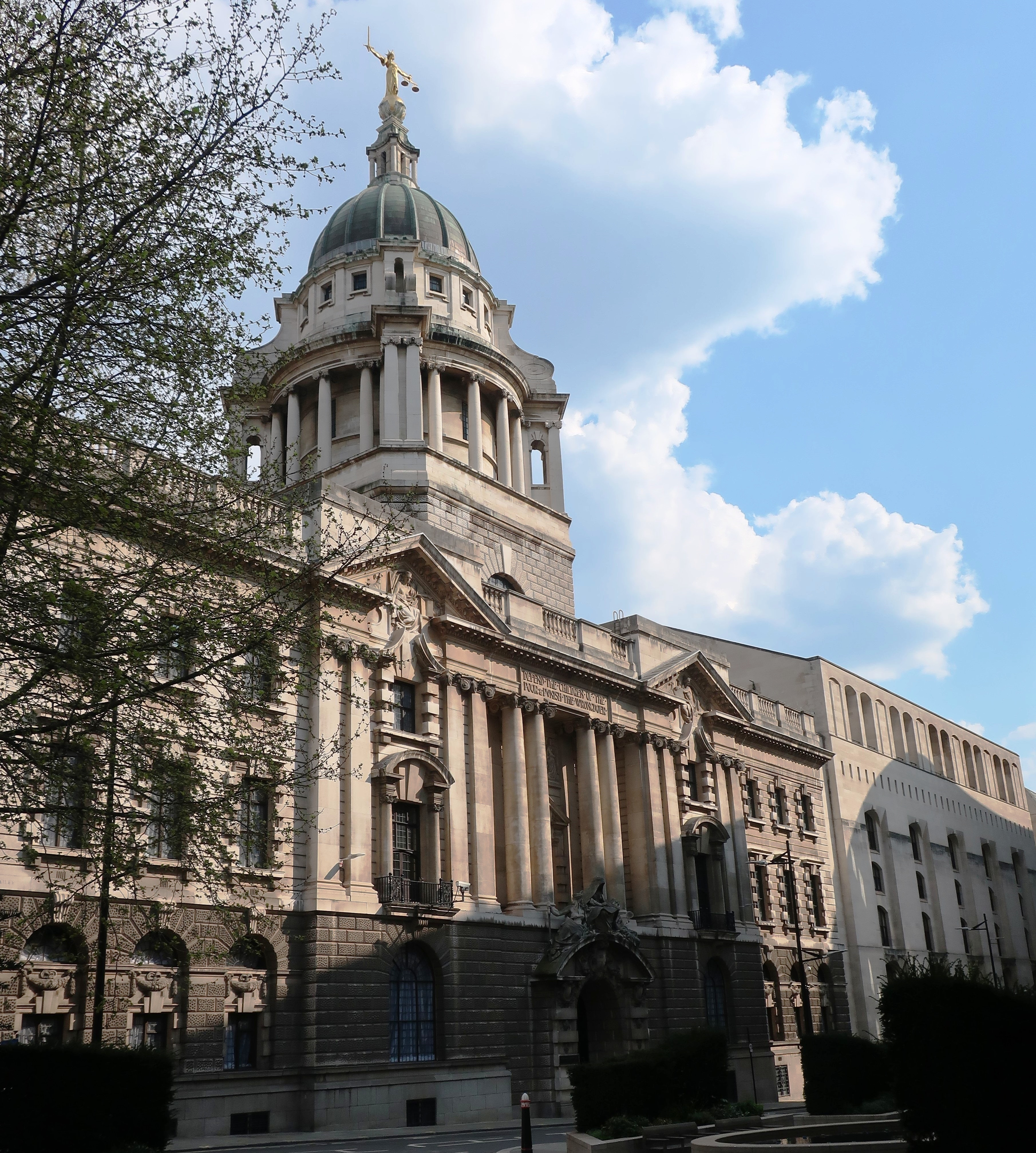
The defendants were tried and convicted at the Old Bailey.

On 14 September 2023, Urfan, Beinash, and Faisal were all charged with murder along with an additional charge of causing or allowing the death of a child. They were remanded in custody ahead of a hearing on 15 September at Guildford Magistrates' Court. They appeared before London's Old Bailey on 19 September 2023 via videolink. A plea hearing took place in December 2023, at which all three pleaded not guilty to each charge, and they were set to stand trial in September 2024. At an Old Bailey hearing on 26 January 2024, Judge Mark Lucraft KC set a provisional trial date for October, with the actual date to be confirmed at a hearing in February. At a hearing on 1 March, it was confirmed the trial was tabled to begin on 1 October. On 8 October 2024, the jury was sworn in at the start of the trial of the three defendants at the Old Bailey.

At the trial, Sara's more than 70 injuries were revealed: these included injuries to her ribs, shoulder blades, fingers and 11 fractures to her spine, a puncture wound to the head, a traumatic brain injury, a burn on her buttock caused by a domestic iron, scalds by hot water, restraint injuries, bruises caused by blunt objects and human bite marks.

The cause of death was determined to be "complications arising from multiple injuries and neglect". A paediatric radiologist provided evidence that Sara had sustained neck injuries that occur "extremely rare[ly]" and that said injuries were likely caused by "manual strangulation with a degree of force above that which we would normally recognise in ligature force – meaning hanging". He said that Sara's spinal fractures were "very rare", and compared them to those usually found in victims of traffic collisions. An osteoarticular pathologist testified that she had hyoid bone and wrist fractures, both of which were determined to be caused deliberately. He also stated that those fractures were not what had killed her.

A burns and plastic surgeon provided evidence, saying that Sara had been burnt on the buttocks by a clothes iron, causing "significant physical and psychological discomfort". He said that though he could not provide an exact date for the injury, he believed it between two and six weeks before her death. There was no evidence of leftover adhesive near the wound, suggesting that the wound was neglected. Sara's feet were also scalded by a liquid. Tim De Meyer, the chief constable of Surrey Police, said that Sara's death was "a crime of the most unimaginable and unspeakable evil" and that the case was "about as bad as I have ever seen." Mark Chapman, a detective chief superintendent in Surrey Police, said that he had never seen "such horrific suffering of a young person" in his 30-year career.

In November 2024, Urfan accepted "full responsibility" for causing Sara's death in court during cross-examination. He called himself the "worst parent on the planet" and admitted during cross-examination that he mistreated Sara, but said that Beinash was "the true villain of the piece" and accused her of assaulting him. On 11 December 2024, Urfan and Beinash were found guilty of murdering Sara. Malik was found not guilty of murder but was found guilty of causing or allowing the death of a child. On 17 December 2024, Urfan was sentenced to life imprisonment with a minimum term of 40 years, while Beinash was sentenced to life imprisonment with a minimum term of 33 years. Malik was sentenced to 16 years.

=== Imprisonment ===
On 1 January 2025, Urfan, while serving his sentence at HM Prison Belmarsh, was ambushed in his cell by two inmates who attacked him by slitting his throat with a tuna can lid. Urfan sustained non-life threatening injuries to his face and neck. He was treated inside the prison and was not transported to a hospital. After the attack, Urfan was transferred to HM Prison Frankland under heavy security. On 14 August 2026, the Crown Prosecution Service confirmed that the two inmates involved in the attack at Belmarsh had been charged with attempting to murder Urfan, along with offences under section 18.

While incarcerated at HM Prison Bronzefield, Beinash was reported to have become good friends with Lucy Letby, a former neonatal nurse convicted of murdering seven infants. The two women played cards together and talked frequently. They were housed in the same secure unit to protect them from other inmates.

=== Related litigation ===
The High Court of Justice placed a gag order on the media in December 2024 to prevent them from reporting the names of the judges that placed Sara in Urfan's custody, due to a "real risk of harm" from a "virtual lynch mob". Geoffrey Vos, the Master of the Rolls, overturned the previous judgement after an appeal by media organisations, calling it "misguided". The judges overseeing the family court trial were named as Alison Raeside, Peter Nathan, and Sally Williams, none of whom requested anonymity.

In January 2025, the Solicitor General's Office referred Urfan's sentence to the Court of Appeal under the Unduly Lenient Sentence Scheme, asking the court to impose a whole life order. At the same time, Urfan, Beinash and Malik petitioned the Court of Appeal to reduce their sentences. A hearing on the cases was held on 13 March 2025 and the court delivered its ruling the same day, upholding all three sentences and rejecting the Solicitor General's application.

== Aftermath ==
Sara was buried in eastern Poland, near the undisclosed village where her mother lived after Sara's death, under her mother's surname of Domin. Her mother remarried and had a son.

Shortly after the end of the murder trial, the Prime Minister, Keir Starmer, called for greater government supervision of home schooled children, and said that Sara's death was "awful". In Parliament, he declared that the government would learn from her death. After his announcement, the Department for Education declared that they were preparing additional regulations on home schooling children to prevent additional children from "falling through the cracks". Lucy Powell, the Leader of the House of Commons, said that the government is "committed to further reform of children’s social care and much stronger safeguards for children being taken into home education", and that such measures are "long overdue".

In 2024, the Children's Wellbeing and Schools Bill, which would make it illegal for parents to home school their children if the child's situation is being investigated by social services or the child is under a child protection plan, was proposed in Parliament. In March 2025, Will Forster, the member of parliament representing Woking, proposed an amendment named Sara's Law to the Children's Wellbeing and Schools Bill that would facilitate increased communication between social services and schools. In June 2025, the amendment was tabled in the House of Lords by Shaffaq Mohammed, Baron Mohammed of Tinsley.

== See also ==
- Murder of Daniel Pełka
- Killing of Maria Colwell
- Murder of Victoria Climbié
- Murder of Arthur Labinjo-Hughes
