= Magdalena Łuczak =

Magdalena Łuczak may refer to:

- Magdalena Łuczak, convicted of the 2012 murder of Daniel Pelka
- Magdalena Łuczak (alpine skier), representing Poland at the 2022 Winter Olympics
