= Olive Stevenson =

British university professor and social worker (1930–2013)

Olive Stevenson, CBE (13 December 1930 – 30 September 2013) was a British social worker and academic. She became known to the wider public through her role in the inquiry into the Murder of Maria Colwell. As an academic, she researched and taught at the University of Oxford, the University of Keele, and the University of Nottingham among other institutions.

== Career ==
=== Social work ===
From 1954 to 1958, Stevenson worked as a child care officer in Devon. She was a social work adviser to the Supplementary Benefits Commission from 1968 to 1970. Her early career was spent specialising in vulnerable children, but she later also worked with vulnerable adults and the elderly.

=== Academic career ===
In 1961, Stevenson joined the University of Oxford as a lecturer. She was appointed Reader in Applied Social Studies in 1970, an appointment she held until she moved university. From 1970 until her death, she was a Fellow of St Anne's College, Oxford. From 1976 to 1982, she was Professor of Social Policy and Social Work at the University of Keele; she was the university's first female professor. She then moved to the University of Nottingham, where she worked as Professor of Social Work Studies between 1984 and 1994.

In 1970, she became the founding editor of the British Journal of Social Work.

=== Public service ===
Following the Murder of Maria Colwell, Stevenson was appointed as a member of the inquiry into her death; this was the "first major national enquiry into a child death". It was led by Thomas Gilbert Field-Fisher and they published their findings as Report of the Committee of Inquiry into the Care and Supervision Provided in Relation to Maria Colwell in September 1974.

She did not agree with the way the committee had interpreted the evidence and in her minority report pointed out the complexities of the role performed by social workers. She also wrote a section of the main report on inter-professional working, then an unopened area. This all brought her what she described as something like celebrity, which she did not welcome.

— Her obituary in The Guardian

From 1973 to 1978, Stevenson was a member of the Royal Commission on Civil Liability. From 1977 to 1983, she was chairwoman of the Advisory Committee on Rent Rebates and Rent Allowances (ACRRRA). She was a member of the Social Security Advisory Committee between 1982 and 2002; this is the successor body to ACRRRA. From 1985 to 1990, she was a member of the Registered Homes Tribunal.

Stevenson served as a chairwoman of a number of organisations: Age Concern England (1980 to 1983), Councils for Voluntary Service National Association (1985 to 1988), and Care and Repair (1993 to 1997).

== Personal life ==
Stevenson was a lesbian. She described the relationships she did have as "fraught with tension and pain", and this led her to undergo psychoanalysis.

Her parents were Irish Protestants who had moved to England to escape the discrimination they experienced in the newly created Republic of Ireland. As such, their daughter "remained deeply distrustful of Catholicism". In her youth she was a Congregationalist but later became agnostic.

== Honours ==
In 1994 Queen's Birthday Honours, Stevenson was appointed a Commander of the Order of the British Empire (CBE) "for the development of social services". She was made an honorary professor of Kingston University in 2003 and of Hong Kong Polytechnic University in 2004.

== Legacy ==
The Stevenson Collection was deposited with the Manuscripts and Special Collections at The University of Nottingham in 2014 and includes her own publications, books collected by Professor Olive Stevenson during her career, and materials she used in her research and teaching.

The Centre for Social Work and the Centre for Applied Social Research at the University of Nottingham established the Olive Stevenson Memorial Lecture in 2014. The inaugural lecture was delivered by Emeritus Professor June Thoburn and titled 'Using the Heart and the Head in Social Work: Olive Stevenson's Legacy for Today and Tomorrow'.
