= Murder of Victoria Climbié =

2000 torture and murder of a child

- Location: London, England
- Date: 25 February 2000
- Attack type: Child murder, child abuse
- Victim: Victoria Adjo Climbié
- Perpetrators: Marie-Thérèse Kouao; Carl Manning
- Verdict: Guilty on all counts
- Convictions: Murder; Manslaughter; Child cruelty
- Sentence: Life imprisonment

Victoria Adjo Climbié (2 November 1991 – 25 February 2000) was an eight-year-old Ivorian girl who was tortured and murdered by her great-aunt, Marie-Thérèse Kouao, and Kouao's boyfriend, Carl Manning. Her death led to a public inquiry and produced major changes in child protection policies in the United Kingdom.

Born in Abobo, Côte d'Ivoire, Victoria Climbié left the country with her great-aunt for an education in France, before they moved to London, England, in April 1999. It is not known exactly when Kouao started abusing Victoria, although it is suspected to have begun when they met and moved in with Manning. The couple would burn her with cigarettes, scald her with hot water, starve her, and hit her with bicycle chains, hammers, wooden spoons, and their bare hands. After Victoria died, Kouao and Manning were both convicted of murder and sentenced to life imprisonment.

The police, the social services department of four local authorities, the National Health Service, the National Society for the Prevention of Cruelty to Children (NSPCC), and local churches all had contact with Victoria and noted signs of abuse, but little action was taken. After her death, a report by Lord Laming made numerous recommendations related to child protection in England. Victoria's death played a large for the formation of the Every Child Matters initiative; the introduction of the Children Act 2004; and the creation of the Office of the Children's Commissioner chaired by the Children's Commissioner for England.

== Life ==
Victoria Climbié
- Victoria Climbié: Photograph dated August 16, 1999.
- Born: Victoria Adjo Climbié; 2 November 1991; Abobo, Ivory Coast
- Died: 25 February 2000 (aged 8); London, England
- Cause of death: Murder by freezing to death
- Resting place: Ivory Coast
- Parent(s): Francis Climbié (father); Berthe Amoissi (mother)

Victoria Adjo Climbié was born on 2 November 1991 in Abobo, Ivory Coast, the fifth of seven children. Her parents were Francis Climbié and his wife Berthe Amoissi. Marie-Thérèse Kouao, Francis' aunt, was born on 17 July 1956 in Bonoua, Ivory Coast, and lived in France with her three sons, claiming welfare benefits. She divorced her former husband in 1978, and he died in 1995. Kouao was attending her brother's funeral in the Ivory Coast when she visited the Climbié family in October 1998. She informed them that she wanted to take a child back to France with her and arrange for their education; this sort of informal fosterage is common in the family's society. Victoria was apparently happy to be chosen, and although her parents had met Kouao only a few times, they were satisfied with the arrangements.

From that point onwards, Kouao fraudulently maintained that Victoria was her daughter. Kouao had originally planned to take another young girl called Anna Kouao, but Anna's parents changed their minds. Victoria travelled on a French passport in the name of Anna Kouao, and was known as "Anna" throughout her life in the United Kingdom. It is not known exactly when Kouao started abusing Victoria. Victoria's parents received three messages about her from when she left them until her death, all saying she was in good health.

=== Paris ===
Marie-Therese Kouao and Victoria Climbié left the Ivory Coast possibly in November 1998 and flew to Paris, France, where Victoria enrolled at school. By December 1998, however, Kouao began to receive warnings about Victoria's absences, and in February 1999, the school issued a child-at-risk notification and a social worker became involved. The school observed how Victoria tended to fall asleep in class, and the headteacher later recalled Kouao's mentioning Victoria suffering from some form of dermatological condition and that, on her last visit to the school on 25 March 1999, Victoria had a shaven head and was wearing a wig. When they left France, Kouao owed the authorities £2,000, after being wrongly paid in child benefit, and it is claimed that Kouao viewed Victoria as a useful tool for claiming benefits. Kouao had also been evicted from her home in France because of rent arrears.

=== London ===
On 24 April 1999, Kouao and Victoria left France and relocated to England, where they settled in Ealing, West London. They had a reservation in a bed and breakfast at Twyford Crescent, Acton, where they lived until 1 May 1999, when they moved to Nicoll Road, Harlesden, in the London Borough of Brent. On 25 April 1999, Kouao and Victoria visited Esther Ackah, a distant relative of Kouao by marriage, and a midwife, counsellor, and preacher. Ackah and her daughter noted that Victoria was wearing a wig and looked small and frail. On 26 April 1999, Kouao and Victoria visited the Homeless Persons' Unit of Ealing Council, where they were seen by Julie Winter, a homeless persons' officer. Together, Kouao and Winter completed a housing application form. Kouao explained that Victoria was wearing a wig because she had short hair, an explanation accepted by Winter. Although Winter was shown Victoria's passport (with a photograph of Anna), she paid no attention to them, believing that Kouao's application was ineligible on the grounds of habitual residence. Winter confirmed her decision with her duty senior and told Kouao that she was not eligible for housing. She telephoned the referral across to Pamela Fortune, a social worker in Ealing's Acton referral and assessment team. She did not produce a written or electronic documentation of the referral, however, something which would have helped in double-checking the accounts that Kouao gave.

Between 26 April and early July 1999, Kouao visited Ealing social services 18 times for housing and financial purposes. Victoria was with her on at least ten occasions. The staff there noted Victoria's unkempt appearance, with one staff member, Deborah Gaunt, thinking that she looked like a child from an ActionAid advertisement. However, they did not take any action, and may have assumed that Victoria's appearance was a purposeful attempt to "persuade the authorities to hand out money". On 8 June 1999, Kouao got a job at Northwick Park Hospital. During her first month, no effort was made by Kouao or Ealing social services to enroll Victoria in educational or daycare activities.

On 8 June 1999, Kouao took Victoria to a local GP surgery. The practice nurse there did not carry out a physical examination, as Victoria was not reported to have any current health problems. By the middle of June 1999, Victoria was spending the majority of her days at the Brent home of Priscilla Cameron, an unregistered childminder, whom Kouao met at her job in the hospital. There is no evidence that Victoria was treated badly during her time with Cameron. On several occasions, Cameron observed small cuts on Victoria's fingers. When questioned by Cameron, Kouao said that they were caused by razor blades that Victoria had played with. Kouao and Victoria met Ackah on the street on or around 14 June 1999. In what may have been early signs of deliberate physical harm, Ackah noted a scar on Victoria's cheek, which Kouao said was caused by a fall on an escalator. On 17 June 1999, in response to what she had seen three days earlier, Ackah visited Kouao and Victoria's home, and thought that the accommodation was unsuitable.

On 18 June 1999, Ackah anonymously telephoned Brent social services, expressing concern over Victoria's situation. Samantha Hunt, the customer-service officer who received the call at the One Stop Shop at Brent House, faxed the referral to the children's social work department on that same day. Nobody picked up the referral on that Friday afternoon, and what happened to it was—according to Lord Laming, who headed the subsequent inquiry—the subject of "some of the most bizarre and contradictory evidence" the inquiry heard. A few days later, possibly on 21 June 1999, Ackah phoned Brent social services again to make sure her concerns were being addressed. Ackah said that she was told by the person on the other end of the telephone that "probably they [social services] had done something about it". This call, however, did not trigger a new, separate referral.

The first referral was not seen until three weeks later on 6 July 1999, when Robert Smith, the group administrative officer, logged the details of the referral onto the computer, with details of Victoria's injuries. Laming said the delay constituted "a significant missed opportunity" to protect Victoria. Edward Armstrong, the team manager of the intake duty team, said that he completed a duty manager's action sheet not for the 18 June referral, which he said never arrived in his office, but for the 21 June referral, which was a less serious case than the first; Laming called this version of events "wholly unbelievable". Laming said that Armstrong's evidence was out of line with that of the other Brent witnesses, that the quality of it "[left] much to be desired", and that Armstrong's insistence that he dealt with the 21 June referral was an attempt to cover up his team's "inept handling" of a genuine child protection case.

On 14 June 1999, Kouao and Victoria met Carl Manning (born 31 October 1972) on a bus which he was driving. This was the start of Kouao and Manning's relationship, which ended at the time of their arrest eight months later. She was his first girlfriend. The relationship developed quickly, and on 6 July 1999, Kouao and Victoria moved into Manning's one-bedroom flat at Somerset Gardens in Tottenham, in the London Borough of Haringey. There is evidence that Victoria's abuse increased soon after moving into Manning's flat.

On 7 July 1999, Brent social services sent a letter to Nicoll Road, where Kouao and Victoria were staying, informing them of a home visit. On 14 July 1999, two social workers, Lori Hobbs and Monica Bridgeman, visited the address but found no answer: Kouao and Victoria had already moved out on 6 July 1999. Hobbs and Bridgeman made no further inquiries at the property, inquiries that might have led to a trail on Victoria's whereabouts. Prior to the visit, they had not done any background checks, and had only the "haziest idea" of what they were investigating. The Laming report suggests that no reports or follow-up notes were made and that the only information additional to the referral were the notes "Not at this address. Have moved."

=== First hospital admission ===
On 13 July 1999, Kouao took Victoria to the childminder, Cameron, asking her to take Victoria permanently, because Manning did not want her. Cameron refused to accept Kouao's request, but agreed to take her for the night. Cameron, her son Patrick, and her daughter Avril, observed that Victoria had numerous injuries—including a burn on her face and a loose piece of skin hanging from her right eyelid—which Kouao said was self-inflicted. Manning's account in the subsequent inquiry differed, and he said that he hit Victoria because of her incontinence, beginning with slaps, but progressing to using his fist by the end of July. It was highly likely that at least some of the injuries were the result of deliberate physical harm.

The next day, on 14 July 1999, Cameron's daughter Avril took Victoria to see Marie Cader, a French teacher at her son's school. Cader advised that Victoria be taken to a hospital. At 11:00 am the same day, Avril took Victoria to the Accident and Emergency department of Central Middlesex Hospital. At 11:50 am, Victoria was seen by Dr Rhys Beynon, a senior house officer in the department. Beynon took Victoria's history from Avril, and thought that there was a strong possibility that the injuries were non-accidental. He referred the case to Dr Ekundayo Ajayi-Obe, the on-call paediatric registrar. Beynon conducted only a cursory examination of Victoria, as he believed she was going to be examined by the paediatric team. The Laming report said that "he exhibited sound judgement in his care of Victoria by referring her immediately to a paediatric registrar." Victoria arrived at Barnaby Bear ward where she was examined by Ajayi-Obe, who noted various injuries. When asked about the injuries, Victoria said they were self-inflicted, a claim the paediatrician did not think was credible. Having examined Victoria, the paediatrician was "strongly suspicious" that the injuries were non-accidental, and she decided to admit Victoria onto the ward.

The doctors alerted Brent police and social services, and she was placed under police protection, with a 72-hour protection order preventing her from leaving hospital. Kouao told the doctors that she had scabies, and that the injuries were self-inflicted. Many doctors and nurses suspected that the injuries were non-accidental. However, Ruby Schwartz, the consultant paediatrician and named child protection doctor at the hospital, diagnosed scabies and decided that it was scratching that caused the injuries. She made the diagnosis without speaking to Victoria alone. Schwartz later admitted that she made a mistake. Another doctor, one of Schwartz's juniors, misleadingly wrote to social services, saying that there was "no child protection issue".

When Michelle Hine, a child protection officer at Brent council, received a report notifying her of Victoria's injuries, she planned to open an investigation into the case. However, the next day, she heard of Schwartz's diagnosis and downgraded Victoria's level of care, trusting Schwartz's judgement. She later expressed regret over her actions. Schwartz said in the inquiry that she expected social services to follow up the case. Neil Garnham QC, counsel to the inquiry following Victoria's death, later said to her, "there is a terrible danger here—is there not, doctor—of social services on the one hand and you on the other each expecting the other to do the investigation, with the result that nobody does". The police officer allocated to Victoria's case for the Brent Child Protection team, Rachel Dewar, decided to lift the police protection, allowing Victoria to return home, when told by a social worker that she had scabies. Under the Children Act 1989, Dewar was obliged to see Victoria, and tell her she was under police protection, but she did not do this. She also failed to see Kouao or Manning. At the time of the decision, Dewar was attending a seminar on child protection. Garnham later said, "we will need to ask why it was thought more important for her to attend a seminar to learn how to deal with child protection cases than deal with the real child protection case for which she was responsible at the time". Kouao took Climbié home on 15 July 1999.

Some time in July, probably just before Victoria was admitted to the Central Middlesex Hospital, Kouao befriended a couple, Julien and Chantal Kimbidima. Victoria and Kouao visited their home several times over the following months. According to Chantal, Kouao would shout at Victoria all the time, and never showed her affection.

=== Second hospital admission ===
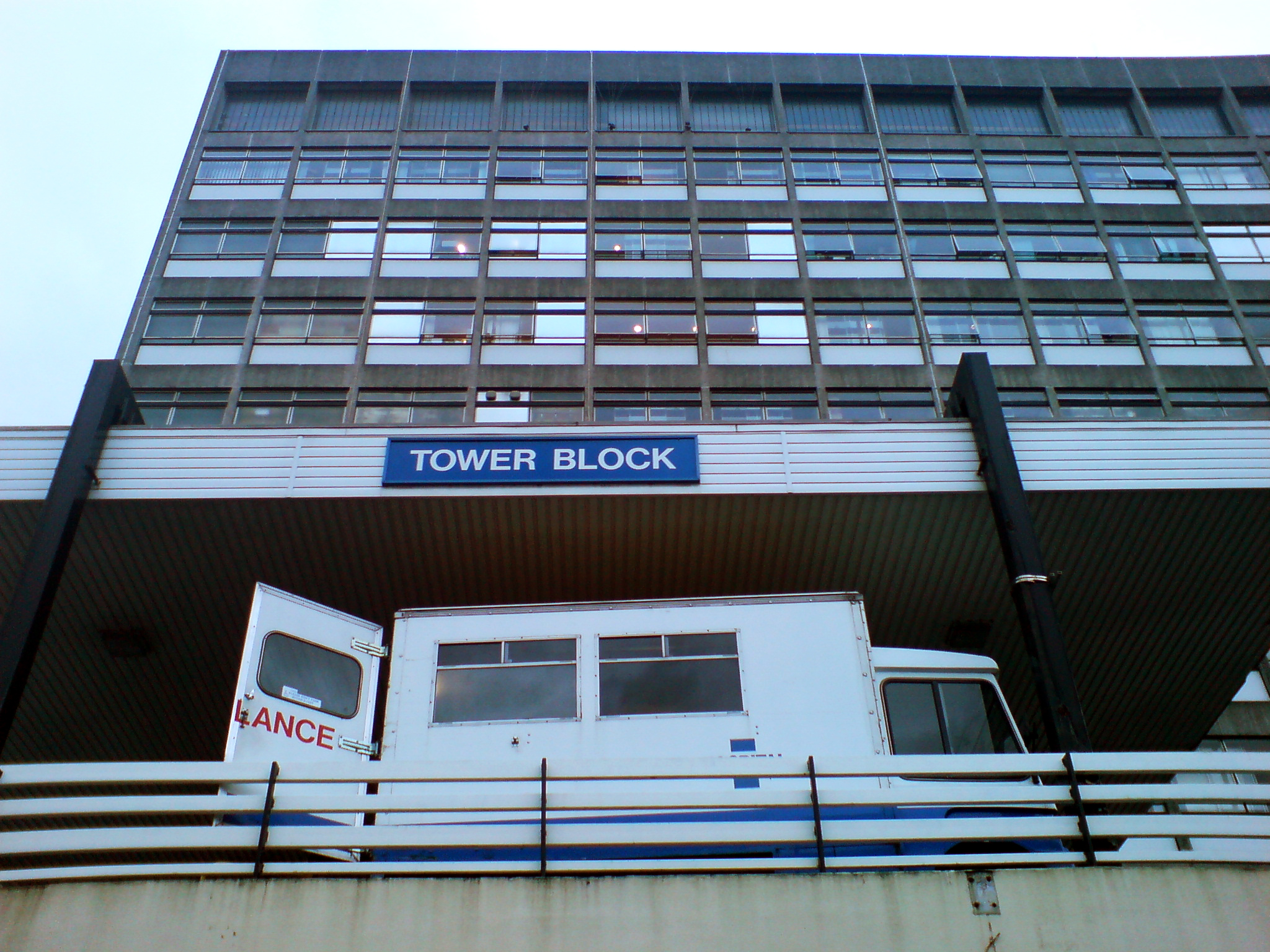
North Middlesex Hospital where Victoria was discharged after being treated for severe scalding

On 24 July 1999, Victoria was taken by Kouao to the accident-and-emergency department at North Middlesex Hospital with severe scalding to her head and other injuries. Doctors described Kouao telling off Victoria, who immediately jumped out of bed and stood to attention, so frightened that she wet herself. The hospital found no evidence of scabies. Consultant Mary Rossiter felt that Victoria was being abused, but still wrote 'able to discharge' on her notes. According to Maureen Ann Meates, another doctor at the hospital, when Rossiter had written that note, she had noted that Victoria was exhibiting signs of neglect, emotional abuse, and physical abuse. Later, in the inquiry, Rossiter said that by writing 'able to discharge', she did not mean she wanted Victoria to go home, merely that she was physically fit to leave. Garnham said, "quite how the subtlety of that distinction was to be ascertained from the notes is far from obvious". Rossiter admitted to the inquiry that she had expected police and social services to follow up on the case. For a brief period while Victoria was in hospital, Enfield social services took up the case before passing it to Haringey.

A social worker from Haringey Council and a police officer, Lisa Arthurworrey and Karen Jones, respectively, were assigned to her case, and were scheduled to make a home visit on 4 August 1999; however, the visit was cancelled once they heard about the scabies. Jones later said, "it might not be logical, but I did not know anything about scabies." She said that she telephoned North Middlesex Hospital for information about the disease, but Garnham had evidence that the staff there dealt with no such inquiry. Jones was told by a doctor that Victoria's injuries were consistent with belt buckle marks, although she claimed in the inquiry there was no evidence of child abuse.

On 5 August 1999, a Haringey social worker, Barry Almeida, took Victoria to an NSPCC centre in Tottenham, where she was assigned to Sylvia Henry. There was some confusion as to why the centre was being referred to for the case. Henry later contacted Almeida and was told, according to Henry, that Victoria had moved out of the borough, thereby closing the case. Almeida said he could not remember whether this conversation did take place. On the same day, Kouao met Arthurworrey and Jones at the Haringey social services department, and claimed that Victoria had poured boiling water over herself to stop the itching caused by the scabies, and that she had used utensils to cause the other injuries. The social worker and police officer believed her, deciding that the injuries were most likely accidental, and allowed Victoria to return home the following day, which she did.

=== Post-hospital events ===
On 7 August 1999, Kouao visited Ealing social services; they said it was a housing issue and that the case was closed. Ealing social services would later be described as 'chaotic'. As a follow-up measure, a staff member at the hospital contacted a health visitor, but the health visitor said in the inquiry that she did not receive any contact. On 13 August 1999, Rossiter wrote to Petra Kitchman of Brent council, asking her to follow up on Climbie's case. Kitchman said in the inquiry that she contacted Arthurworrey, but Arthurworrey denied this. Later, on 2 September 1999, Rossiter sent a second letter. Kitchman said she spoke to Arthurworrey about this, but Arthurworrey denied this again. Arthurworrey made a visit to Victoria's home on 16 August 1999, and another one when Manning began forcing Victoria to sleep in the bathtub. Arthurworrey said in the inquiry that she was under the impression that Victoria seemed happy, but Garnham criticised Arthurworrey for not detecting any of the abuse, although Manning had described this visit as a "put up job". Arthurworrey and Victoria had met on four occasions, where they were together for a total of less than 30 minutes, barely speaking to each other.

From then on, Kouao kept Victoria away from hospitals, turning instead to churches. Kouao said to the pastors that she was the mother, and that demons were inside Victoria. The pastor at the Mission Ensemble Pour Christ, Pascal Orome, offered prayers for Victoria to cast out the devil, and thought that her injuries were due to demonic possession. On another occasion, Kouao took Victoria to a church run by the Universal Church of the Kingdom of God, where the pastor, Alvaro Lima, suspected she was being abused, although he took no action. He said in the inquiry that Victoria told him that Satan had told her to burn herself. The pastor did not believe her, but he still believed that a person could be possessed.

From October 1999 to January 2000, Manning forced Victoria to sleep in a bin liner in the bathtub in her own excrement. During a later police interview, Manning said this was because of her frequent bedwetting. At Haringey social services on 1 November 1999, Kouao told social workers that Manning sexually assaulted Victoria, but withdrew the accusation the following day. In one of Arthurworrey's visits, during a conversation about housing, Arthurworrey said that the council accommodated only children who were believed to be at serious risk. Laming said in his report, "it may be no coincidence that within three days of this conversation, Kouao contacted Ms. Arthurworrey to make allegations which, if true, would have placed Victoria squarely within that category". Jones sent a letter to Kouao, which was ignored, and no further action was taken. Manning later denied the allegation. Alan Hodges, the police sergeant overseeing the investigation, claimed in the inquiry that the social workers were obstructing the police in dealing with child protection cases. Between December 1999 and January 2000, Arthurworrey made three visits to the flat, but she received no answer. She speculated to her supervisor, Carole Baptiste, that they had returned to France. Despite no evidence, her supervisor wrote on Victoria's file that they had left the area. On 18 February 2000, they wrote to Kouao, saying that if they did not receive any contact from them, they would close the case. A week later, on 25 February 2000, they closed the case—on the same day that Victoria died.

Marie-Thérèse Kouao
- Born: 17 July 1956 (age 70); Bonoua, Côte d'Ivoire
- Status: Incarcerated in HM Prison Durham
- Convictions: Murder and child cruelty
- Criminal charges: Murder and child cruelty
- Penalty: Life imprisonment

Carl Manning
- Born: 31 October 1972 (age 54)
- Occupation: Bus driver
- Status: Incarcerated at HMP Wakefield
- Convictions: Murder and child cruelty
- Criminal charges: Murder and child cruelty
- Penalty: Life imprisonment

=== Death and trial ===
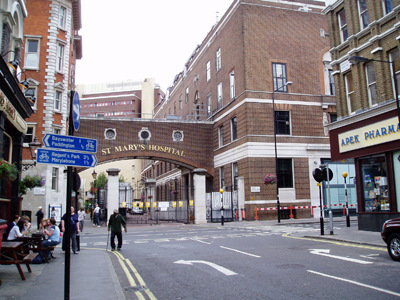
St Mary's hospital, where Victoria Climbié died

On 24 February 2000, Climbié was taken, unconscious and suffering from hypothermia, multiple organ failure, and malnutrition, to the local Universal Church of the Kingdom of God. With the advice of the pastor, a mini-cab was called to send Victoria to the hospital. The mini-cab driver was horrified at Victoria's condition, and took her to the nearby Tottenham Ambulance Station instead. Victoria was rushed straight to the accident-and-emergency department at North Middlesex Hospital; she was then transferred to the intensive-care unit at St Mary's Hospital. The ambulance crew who drove her to St Mary's described how although Kouao had kept saying, "my baby, my baby", her concern seemed "not quite enough", and that Manning seemed "almost as if he was not there". Climbié died on 25 February 2000 at 3:15 pm. The pathologist who examined her body noted 128 separate injuries and scars on her body, and described it as the worst case of child abuse she had ever seen; Victoria had been bound, burned, scalded, starved, and beaten.

During her life in Britain, Victoria was known to four local authorities (four social services departments and three housing departments), two child protection police teams, two hospitals, an NSPCC centre, and a few local churches. She was buried in Grand-Bassam near her home town in Côte d'Ivoire.

Kouao was arrested on the day that Victoria died, and Manning the following day. Kouao told police, "It is terrible, I have just lost my child". On 20 November 2000, at the Old Bailey, the trial into her death opened, where Kouao and Manning were charged with child cruelty and murder. Kouao denied all charges, and Manning pleaded guilty to charges of cruelty and manslaughter. The judge described the people in Victoria's case as "blindingly incompetent". In his diary, Manning described Victoria as Satan, and said that no matter how hard he hit her, she did not cry or show signs that she was hurt. On 12 January 2001, both were found guilty and sentenced to life imprisonment. The judge said to them, "What [Victoria] endured was truly unimaginable. She died at both your hands, a lonely, drawn-out death". Kouao was transferred to HM Prison Durham, and Manning went to HM Prison Wakefield.

== Inquiry ==
On 20 April 2000, the health secretary, Alan Milburn, and the home secretary, Jack Straw, appointed William Laming, Lord Laming, former chief inspector of the Social Services Inspectorate (SSI), to conduct a statutory inquiry into Climbié's death. Laming was given the choice of staging a public inquiry or a private inquiry; he chose a public inquiry. It was the first inquiry to be set up by two secretaries of state. The inquiry was actually three separate inquiries, together called the Victoria Climbié Inquiry, as it had a statutory base of three pieces of legislation: section 81 of the Children Act 1989, section 84 of the National Health Service Act 1977, and section 49 of the Police Act 1996. It drew together the involvement of social services, the National Health Service, and the police, and became the first tripartite inquiry into child protection. The Counsel to the Inquiry was Neil Garnham QC, and the counsel for Victoria's parents was Joanna Dodson QC. The inquiry, based in Hannibal House, Elephant and Castle, London, cost £3.8 million, making it the most expensive child protection investigation in British history. The website victoria-climbie-inquiry.org.uk was created, where all the evidence and documents were made available freely.

The inquiry was launched on 31 May 2001, and was split into two phases. Phase one investigated the involvement of people and agencies in Climbié's death, in the form of hearings. Two hundred and seventy witnesses were involved. Phase one hearings began on 26 September 2001 and finished on 31 July 2002; it was originally supposed to end on 4 February 2002 but late documents caused delays. Phase two of the inquiry, taking place between 15 March 2002 and 26 April 2002, took the form of five seminars, which looked at the child protection system in general. It was chaired by Garnham and brought together experts in all aspects of child protection.

=== Laming controversy ===
Laming's appointment was controversial as he had been director of Hertfordshire County Council's social services department in 1990, a department which was strongly criticised for its handling of a child abuse case, and which had the Local Government Ombudsman making a finding of 'maladministration with injustice' against them in 1995. The father of the child in the case said of Laming's appointment, "I don't see how he has the qualifications or experience to be able to lead an investigation into another borough which has been failing to protect a child in exactly the same manner that his own authority failed to protect a child in 1990". Liberal Democrat spokesman Paul Burstow said, "the findings of the ombudsman in the Hertfordshire case must give rise to questions about Lord Laming's appointment to head this inquiry"; and Conservative Party spokesman Liam Fox said, "I think the government maybe should have thought twice about this and maybe, even yet, they will think again." The Department for Health, however, said that they were "fully confident that he is the right person to conduct the inquiry."

=== Obstruction of evidence ===
Several documents were submitted late or under suspicious circumstances to the inquiry. A report by the Social Services Inspectorate (SSI) was submitted late because the SSI presumed the document was not relevant to the inquiry. The report was produced in April 2001 but was not handed over to the inquiry until 2002. An earlier report by the Joint Review about Haringey social services, which was heavily relied upon during the inquiry, said that service users were "generally well served"; the SSI report said that the former report presented "an overly positive picture of Haringey's social services, particularly children's services". Further documents were received late, when Haringey council handed in 71 case documents five months after the hearings began. Laming said, "it shows a blatant and flagrant disregard to the work of this inquiry". The people involved were threatened with disciplinary action. This was not the first time that Haringey council did not produce documents on time, which led Laming to say to its chief executive, "it is a long sad and sorry saga of missed dates and missed timetables". Garnham warned that Haringey senior managers, who had access to the documents, would enjoy an unfair advantage in the inquiry, but Laming said he was "determined that Haringey is not given any advantage". The inquiry found contradictory information in the NSPCC's files. One file said that Climbié's case was "accepted for ongoing service", while another computer record, made after Climbié's death, said that "no further action" was to be taken, suggesting the possibility that records may have been changed. Documents given to the inquiry may also have been altered: the NSPCC provided photocopies of original documents, which had alterations in them, saying that the originals were lost; however, the originals were later produced with pressure from the inquiry. The NSPCC held an internal investigation but found no evidence of deception.

=== Findings of the hearings ===
The inquiry heard that many of the councils were understaffed, underfunded, and poorly managed. The chief executive of Brent council said its social services department was "seriously defective". The inquiry was told that many cases at Brent social services were closed inappropriately before inspection by the social services inspectorate, that children were being placed unaccompanied in bed-and-breakfast accommodation, and that children in need were turned away. The inquiry heard how Edward Armstrong had previously been ordered not to work with children over his handling of a case in 1993. Haringey and Brent councils diverted £18.7 million and over £26 million, respectively, in the two years 1997/98 and 1998/99, from its social services department into services such as education, for other purposes; both underspent their budgets for children's services, totalling £28m, by more than £10m in 1998–99, causing a deterioration of child protection services. The inquiry heard how Haringey council failed to assign social workers to 109 children in May 1999, a short period before they took on Climbié's case. Again in January 2002, Haringey council failed to assign social workers to about 50 children. Haringey council wrote a letter to Laming claiming that social workers who gave evidence were being questioned more harshly than other witnesses. Laming condemned the letter, saying "I will not tolerate any covert attempt to influence the way in which the inquiry is conducted." Mary Richardson, the director of social services at Haringey from 1 April 1998 until 31 March 2000, had been responsible for a restructuring of the department which, according to the union UNISON, had "virtually paralysed" the child protection service. She received contact from twelve senior practitioners and team managers criticising the proposals as "potentially dangerous and detrimental to the people to whom we offer a service". Richardson provided no substantive response to the memorandum. She did, however, say in the inquiry that the blame lay on "part of all of the line management responsibility". Gurbux Singh, the former chief executive of Haringey council (before becoming the chairman of the Commission for Racial Equality), said that there was nothing he could have done to prevent Climbié's death. Garnham contrasted this with Rossiter's willingness to accept responsibility, saying, "that willingness to acknowledge error is at least at the root, is it not, of progress?"

Kouao herself was called to the inquiry, becoming the first convicted murderer to appear in person in a public inquiry. She initially refused to answer questions, and when she did, protested her innocence, first in French, then, raising her voice in anger, in English. Giving evidence by video link from prison, Manning apologised for his actions and said that it was not the fault of the various agencies that Climbié died. Broadcasters applied for access to this video, but Laming refused the application. Climbié's parents gave evidence and were present at most of the hearings, becoming distressed when hearing of Climbié's plight and seeing pictures of her injuries. They blamed Haringey council and its chief executive for Climbié's death.

Arthurworrey, a junior worker with only nineteen months of child protection experience when she took on Climbié's case, was found to have made mistakes in the case. She accused her employer of "making her a scapegoat", and criticised her superiors and department for not guiding her properly. The inquiry heard that Arthurworrey was overworked, taking on more cases than guidelines allow. Carole Baptiste, Arthurworrey's first supervisor, initially refused to attend the hearings, but subsequently gave vague responses to the inquiry, and said that she had been suffering from mental illness at the time. Baptiste's own child was taken into care a few months before Climbié's death. Arthurworrey said that, in their meetings, Baptiste spent most of the time discussing "her experiences as a black woman and her relationship with God", rather than child protection cases, and that she was frequently absent. Baptiste admitted she had not read Climbié's file properly. She was removed in November 1999 when she was found to be professionally unfit for her job, and replaced by Angella Mairs, who became Arthurworrey's new supervisor. Mairs was accused by Arthurworrey of not maintaining childcare standards and of removing an important document—which recommended that Climbié's case be closed—from Climbié's file on 28 February 2000, the day the news of the death was known; but she denied this. Mairs said that she had not read Climbié's file.

The inquiry heard that the number of child protection police officers in the Metropolitan Police Service was reduced to increase the number of murder investigation officers because of the Stephen Lawrence case in 1993. A detective inspector supervising six child protection teams in London at the time of Climbié's death wrote a report criticising their competence. His former boss, however, claimed he had been lying when he said he only held "purely administrative" responsibility for the teams. The detective inspector was taken to hospital when a woman poured ink over his head while testifying. The new chief executive of Haringey council, David Warwick, Baptiste, the Metropolitan Police, and the NSPCC apologised for their failings in the case.

=== Racial considerations ===
In his opening speech on 26 September 2001, Garnham said that race may have played a part in the case, due to the fact that a black child was murdered by her black carers, and the social worker and police officer most closely involved in the case were black. He said that the fear of being accused of racism may have led to the inaction. In the hearings, Arthurworrey, who is African-Caribbean, admitted that her assumptions about African–Caribbean families influenced her judgement, and that she had assumed Climbié's timidity in the presence of Kouao and Manning stemmed not from fear, but from the African–Caribbean culture of respect towards one's parents. Jacqui Smith, Home Secretary from 2007, said: "I have not seen widespread evidence that social workers are not taking action", and, "there are no cultures that condone child abuse. We are absolutely clear that social workers and social work departments have a responsibility to consider whether children are subjected to harm, and if they think they are, to take action". One chapter of the report following the inquiry looked at this issue.

== Aftermath ==
=== Laming report ===
When both phases of the inquiry were completed, Lord Laming began writing the final report. The Laming report, published on 28 January 2003, found that the agencies involved in her care had failed to protect her, and that on at least twelve occasions, workers involved in her case could have prevented her death, particularly condemning the senior managers involved. On the day of the launch of the report, Climbié's mother sang her daughter's favourite song as a tribute.

The 400-page report made 108 recommendations in child protection reform. Regional and local committees for children and families are to be set up, with members from all groups involved in child protection. Previously each local authority managed their own child protection register, a list of children believed to be at risk, and no national register existed; this, combined with local authorities' tendency to suppress information about child abuse cases, led to the implementation of the child database. Two organisations to improve the care of children, the General Social Care Council and the Social Care Institute for Excellence, had already been set up by the time the report was published.

=== Criticism of agencies ===
Following Climbié's death, the agencies in the case, as well as the child services system in general, were widely criticised. Milburn said, "this was not a failing on the part of one service, it was a failing on the part of every service". Fox said Climbié's case amounted to "a shocking tale of individual professional failure and systemic incompetence". Burstow said, "there is a terrible sense of déjà vu in the Laming Report. The same weaknesses have led to the same mistakes, with the same missed opportunities to save a tortured child's life". Labour Party Member of Parliament Karen Buck said, "the Bayswater families unit told me that there must be hundreds of other Climbié cases waiting to happen", and "the Victoria Climbié inquiry highlighted how easy it is for vulnerable families to fall through the net, especially if they do not have English as a first language and are highly mobile". The 1999 Department of Health document, Working Together to Safeguard Children (now superseded), set out child protection guidance to doctors, nurses, and midwives. The Royal College of Nursing, however, said that there was evidence that many nurses did not receive proper training in these areas. Denise Platt, chief inspector of the social services inspectorate (SSI), said doctors, police officers and teachers often thought their only responsibility was to help social services, forgetting that they had a distinct role to play. Mike Leadbetter, president of the Association of Directors of Social Services, said that many health professionals were "not engaged in child protection". After the inquiry, there was a feeling that senior managers had managed to escape responsibility and that only junior staff members were punished. Burstow said, "the majority of children who die from abuse or neglect in this country know the perpetrator; it is within the family and by 'friends' that most abuse occurs. As a society we are still in denial about that hard truth".

=== Criticism of the report ===
The Laming report was criticised by Caroline Abrahams and Deborah Lightfoot of NCH as too narrow, focusing too much on the particular case of Victoria Climbié and not on general child protection. According to Harry Ferguson, a professor of social work at the University of the West of England, "Laming's report focuses too heavily on the implementation of new structures and fails to understand the keen intuition that child protection work demands". He criticised the approach to child protection of focusing too much on the worst cases and trying too much to prevent them, rather than having an approach that also celebrates success; and said that focusing too much on any individual case and basing reforms on that was "deeply problematic". Laming responded to criticism by the Association of Directors of Social Services that his recommendations would require much more funding by saying that these arguments lacked "intellectual rigour", and he dismissed claims that his reforms would be too bureaucratic. The Guardian said that the report does not address the issues of frontline staff. Deryk Mead of NCH said, "I do believe that inquiry reports have made a positive difference to the child protection system, and I have every confidence that Lord Laming's report will do so too".

=== Other ===
The Guardian discussed the media attention surrounding the case, noticing how sensational events received widespread coverage, yet important but less exciting events received less. It states that only it and The Independent of the national newspapers gave significant coverage to the evidence in the hearings. A possible explanation is given as, "much of the evidence has been concerned with social services, which many other papers view as a politically correct waste of money for the undeserving".

In August 2002, Baptiste was fined £500 after being found guilty of deliberately failing to attend the inquiry. Climbié's parents, speaking through a family friend, said, "we, the family, expected her to be dealt with more severely". This was the first time a person had been prosecuted for not attending a public inquiry. In September 2002, Arthurworrey and Mairs were sacked following disciplinary procedures. The education secretary, Charles Clarke, also added them to the Protection of Children Act 1999 List, banning them from working with children. In October 2004, Arthurworrey appealed against her dismissal, saying that she was duped by Kouao and Manning, misled by medical reports, badly advised by her managers, and that she was a scapegoat for other people's failures, but the appeal was rejected. In 2005, she appealed the ban preventing her from working with children and won the case. This decision was challenged in the High Court but she prevailed. In 2004, six police officers involved in the case faced misconduct charges. All six kept their jobs, and some received reprimands and cautions. In 2004, the General Medical Council dropped misconduct charges against Dr Schwartz.

Haringey council held a debate in the council chambers to discuss the Laming report. The parents of Victoria Climbié were invited to speak at the council by Councillor Ron Aitken, but the Council leader George Meehan denied them permission. Only pressure from the opposition and local press got the decision reversed. As George Meehan only reversed his decision just before the meeting, a driver was rushed to Acton to escort Francis and Berthe Climbié and Mor Dioum, their interpreter, to the council. At the meeting, the Climbiés attacked the council, through their interpreter, for its handling of the case, especially in its dealing with the Laming Inquiry. (Mor Dioum later went on to be the Director of the Victoria Climbié Foundation.)

The government placed Haringey social services department under special measures, requiring close supervision by the social services inspectorate. Allegations emerged that in 2004 and 2005, senior managers at Haringey council ignored child abuse cases and "became hostile" against a social worker who sought to expose the abuse.

Climbié's parents created the Victoria Climbié Foundation UK, a charity that seeks to improve child protection policies, and the Victoria Climbié Charitable Trust, an organisation to build a school in the Ivory Coast. They are also involved in championing many child protection reforms. A playwright, Lance Nielsen, wrote a play based on the events, staged at the Hackney Empire throughout 2002.

After Climbié's death, commentators discussed the history of child protection and the various abuse and death cases, noting that there have been 70 public inquiries into child abuse since 1945, and comparing Climbié's case with that of many others, especially that of Maria Colwell in 1973. They pointed to the many children abused and killed by their guardians over the years and how the agencies involved in their care let them down. They noted similarly that their deaths also led to inquiries and reform policies—reforms that have not saved the many children killed following them. They pointed out that, "an average of 78 children are killed by parents or minders every year; a figure unaltered in the 30 years since Maria Colwell's death provoked the first criticism of 'communications failure'". They expressed cynicism towards the possibility that these reforms would be different. Dr Chris Hanvey, director of operations at Barnardo's, for example, said, "Victoria's tragic case is the latest in a sad roll-call of child deaths, each leading to fresh inquiries and a new but recurring set of recommendations". Ian Willmore, former deputy leader of Haringey council, said, "the 'script' for this kind of inquiry is now almost traditional. The Minister goes on TV to insist that: 'this must never happen again'. Responsibility is pinned on a few expendable front-line staff, all conveniently sacked in advance. Criticisms are made about poor communication, with earnest recommendations about better co-ordination and possible restructuring. Council officers—all new appointments—go on TV to say that everything has changed since the case began. Everyone looks very earnest. Voices crack with compassion. Nothing essential changes."

In the United Kingdom, the Audit Commission regulates social services; John Seddon pointed out in The Times that "Haringey Council was rated 4-star at the time of Victoria Climbié and Baby P's deaths".

=== Child protection changes ===
Climbié's death was largely responsible for various changes in child protection in England, including the formation of the Every Child Matters programme, an initiative designed to improve the lives of children; the introduction of the Children Act 2004, an Act of Parliament that provides the legislative base for many of the reforms; the creation of ContactPoint, a database designed to hold information on all children in England and Wales (now no longer in operation); and the creation of the post of children's commissioner, who heads the Office of the Children's Commissioner, a national agency serving children and families.

=== DMM-attachment theory perspective ===
Professionals using the dynamic-maturational model of attachment and adaptation (DMM) consider the Climbié case a good example of how an attachment strategy can be misinterpreted by well meaning professionals. Climbié is assumed to be using self-protective attachment strategies identified as compulsive compliance (A4), compulsive performance (A4-), and/or compulsive self-reliance (A6).

Some hallmarks of these attachment patterns include putting other's needs (such as the primary caregivers) ahead of one's own needs even if to one's ultimate detriment, the use of false positive affect, and denial of pain. The child's display of affect is geared towards their carer's expectations, dismissing and hiding her own felt need for comfort or protection. False positive affect involves the use of positive affect, or behaviors, when negative affect would be more expected. Overbright smiles while experiencing pain and danger is one form of false positive affect.

Examples of behaviors consistent with these attachment behaviors, and the impacts on the various professionals, are described above. They also include statements such as "Victoria had the most beautiful smile that lit up the room", "...twirling up and down the ward. She was a very friendly and happy child," and Manning's statement "You could beat her and she wouldn't cry... she could take the beatings and the pain like anything." During her 13-day stay at North Middlesex Hospital, the hospital's doctor responsible for child protection found Victoria to be a "little ray of sunshine."

DMM developer Patricia Crittenden commented that while the Laming report pointed out that tell-tale signs had been missed, the signs were present and noticed but their meaning was not understood. Misinterpreted attachment behavior signs can cause professionals to be more easily and unwittingly recruited into a disturbed parent's "story" of the child.

The DMM is a modern update to attachment theory, was not widely known to professionals at the time of Climbié's death, and was just starting to gain circulation in 2000. The A4, A4- and A6 attachment patterns were developed through the study of attachment assessments in the 1980s, 1990s and 2000s.

== See also ==
- Killing of Baby P
- Murder of Daniel Pełka
- Murder of Zachary Turner
- Murder of Gabriel Fernandez
- Murder of Arthur Labinjo-Hughes

== Sources ==
1. Laming, William (January 2003). The Victoria Climbié Inquiry: Report of an Inquiry by Lord Laming. The Stationery Office. Hosted at the Government of the United Kingdom website.
2. Health Committee. House of Commons. The Victoria Climbié Inquiry Report: Sixth Report of Session 2002–2003. The Stationery Office. 25 June 2003.
3. Every Child Matters. The Stationery Office. September 2003. Every Child Matters consultation page.
4. Department for Education and Skills (October 2003). "The government's response to the Health Committee's sixth report of session 2002–03 on the Victoria Climbié inquiry report" (PDF). The Stationery Office.
5. "Every Child Matters: The Next Steps" (PDF). The Stationery Office. 2004. Consultation page.
6. "Every Child Matters" (PDF). The Stationery Office. November 2004.
7. Laming, William (12 March 2009). "The Protection of Children in England: A Progress Report" (PDF). The Stationery Office.
