= Getting it right for every child =

Scottish policy framework

Getting it right for every child (GIRFEC; /ˈɡɜːrfɛk/ GUR-fek) is the Scottish Government's approach to supporting children and young people. It is intended as a framework that will allow organisations who work on behalf of the country's children and their families to provide a consistent, supportive approach for all. It is best known for the controversial "Named Person" requirement, referred to as a "state guardian" in some media.

It requires that services aimed at children and young people – social work, health, education, police, housing and voluntary organisations – adapt and streamline their systems and practices and work together. The approach encourages earlier intervention by professionals to avoid crisis situations at a later date.

== Development of GIRFEC ==
The GIRFEC approach arose out of the review of the Children's Hearings System in 2004. The review recognised that in order to improve outcomes for vulnerable children, agencies need to intervene earlier, in a better and more integrated way in response to identified needs and risks, and not when a threshold is reached to trigger action. The origins of the approach can be traced back to the Kilbrandon Report (1964), reinforced by publications such as 'For Scotland's Children'.

Development and early implementation of this approach took place across Scotland. In Highland there were pathfinder projects that launched in September 2006 followed by an implementation phase that began in January 2008. The Lanarkshire pathfinder reported that GIRFEC had led to a sharper focus on the needs of the child and had also helped a culture of shared responsibility among education, health and social work.

Implementation of GIRFEC has included some change management elements, with a programme designed to achieve some consistency around meeting the needs of – and improving outcomes for – all children and young people in Scotland.

The Scottish Government has published a number of guides and resources. to support implementation.

In October 2012, a programme of visits was carried out by HM Inspectors to review the readiness of the education system in using GIRFEC approaches to help ensure that children and families get the right help at the right time.

== Legislation ==
In July 2012, details of a bill were announced that included embedding the GIRFEC approach in a single system of planning and delivery across children's services A 12-week period of consultation followed and many organisations and individuals submitted responses. The Children and Young People (Scotland) Act 2014 became law on the 27 March 2014 enshrining in law key elements of the Getting it Right approach.

== Opposition to named person requirement of GIRFEC ==
Under GIRFEC, each child in Scotland will be assigned a "Named Person". The Named Person is intended to be a clear point of contact if a child, young person or their parents want information or advice, or if they want to talk about any worries and seek support. The Named Person will usually be the health visitor for a pre-school child and a promoted teacher - such as a headteacher, or guidance teacher or other promoted member of staff - for a school age child.

Criticism of the Named Person requirement has been aired in some press, newspaper columns, and by home educators, churches, various opposition MSPs and lawyers. Concerns expressed by home educators included: the "Named Person" requirement not being an opt-in service; "wellbeing" may be subject to the bias of the Named Person; and personal data is gathered and shared.

In July 2014, a campaign group lodged legal papers at the Court of Session, challenging the Named Person plans. In January 2015, this legal challenge was dismissed, with the judge explaining that the case "fails on all points". An appeal against this dismissal was heard by Lord Carloway in the Court of Session in June 2015. Lord Carloway also dismissed the concerns raised by the campaign group saying "It [the creation of a Named Person] has no effect whatsoever on the legal, moral or social relationships within the family. The assertion to the contrary, without any supporting basis, has the appearance of hyperbole."

=== UK Supreme Court ruling ===
On 28 July 2016, the UK Supreme Court ruled against some aspects of the scheme. Judges said that some proposals breach rights to privacy and a family life under the European Convention on Human Rights. While they said that the aim of the Act is "unquestionably legitimate and benign" they also said that specific proposals about information-sharing "are not within the legislative competence of the Scottish Parliament" and that the legislation made it "perfectly possible" that confidential information about a young person could be disclosed to a "wide range of public authorities without either the child or young person or her parents being aware".

The Scottish government said it will not commence the legislation until the criticisms are addressed, delaying the implementation until after the end of 2016.

=== Abandonment of the policy ===
A panel of experts was subsequently set up by then-Education Secretary John Swinney to make the policy compatible with the court's ruling, but it concluded that it could not produce a workable code of practice on information-sharing. On 19 September 2019, Swinney announced that plans for the Named Person requirement would be abandoned.

== See also ==
- Every Child Matters, in England
