= Killing of Maria Colwell =

1973 child murder in Brighton, England

Maria Ann Colwell
- Born: 26 March 1965; Hove, Sussex, England
- Died: 7 January 1973 (aged 7); Brighton, Sussex, England
- Cause of death: Child abuse, head injury, brain damage
- Resting place: Portslade, East Sussex, England
- Parent(s): Raymond Colwell (father); Pauline Kepple (mother); William Kepple (stepfather)

Maria Ann Colwell (26 March 1965 – 7 January 1973) was a British child who was killed by her stepfather in January 1973. The case was widely reported at the time and resulted in a public inquiry.

Over 50 years after her death, the case of Maria Colwell has remained in the collective memory and is often referenced when similar cases come to light, such as the deaths of Victoria Climbié in 2000, Peter Connelly in 2007 and Daniel Pełka in 2012, and in government papers on the subject of safeguarding of children.

Maria was the fifth of seven siblings and was survived by her three elder brothers and sister and her younger half-brother and half-sister, as well as her foster parents, Bob and Doris Cooper, with whom she spent six years of her life.

== Life and death ==
Maria was born on 26 March 1965. When she was a few months old, her father, Raymond Colwell, died, and subsequently Maria and her siblings were all placed in foster care. In 1966, she was placed with her aunt and uncle, Doris and Bob Cooper. There she was said to be very happy and well looked after.

Her situation changed drastically when, on 22 October 1971, she returned to live with her biological mother, Pauline Kepple, and her husband, William Kepple, on the Whitehawk council estate in Brighton, England.

William Kepple had children with Pauline, and the couple favoured those children over Maria without compunction; for example, Kepple bought his biological children ice cream and required Maria to watch as they ate it, having refused to buy any for her. Many neighbours and teachers communicated concerns to various agencies. Nevertheless, even though she appeared "almost a walking skeleton", Maria was allowed to remain with the Kepples and her half-siblings.

On the night of 6 January 1973, William Kepple arrived home at 11:30 pm to find Maria still awake and watching television. Her mother, fearing her drunk and violent husband, had kept Maria up. Maria refused to acknowledge him upon his return home, and he responded violently. He repeatedly kicked her, leaving her with severe injuries, both internal and external; then he went to bed. The following morning, he wheeled Maria in a pram to the Royal Sussex County Hospital in Brighton with severe internal injuries, including brain damage; she died shortly after arrival. Maria had an empty stomach when she died. Both her eyes were blackened and she had a fractured rib.

== Aftermath ==
The case captured the public's attention and the press called for action. Despite the publication of a book urging the tragedy not to be forgotten, it took over thirty years before agencies were required by law to guarantee the free flow of information.

An inquiry was set up and chaired by Thomas Gilbert Field Fisher, a Recorder of the Crown Court. Other members included Olive Stevenson, a social work academic. The Report of the Committee of Inquiry into the Care and Supervision Provided in Relation to Maria Colwell identified three main contributory factors: the lack of communication between the agencies who were aware of her vulnerable situation; inadequate training for social workers assigned to at-risk children; and changes in the make-up of society.

"It is not enough for the State as representing society to assume responsibility for those such as Maria" Fisher

Kepple was later found guilty of manslaughter and sentenced to eight years in prison; his sentence was halved on appeal.

Despite the local council commissioning its own response to Fisher's findings, Children at risk: a study by the East Sussex County Council into the problems revealed by the Report of the Inquiry into the case of Maria Colwell, and repeated "it must never happen again" press articles, there were several high-profile cases after the Colwell case, such as the cases of Heidi Koseda, and Jasmine Beckford, before the case of Victoria Climbié finally produced the government legislation known as Every Child Matters.
