= Christian Institute =

UK charity

- Abbreviation: CI
- Formation: 1991
- Type: Christian charity
- Headquarters: Wilberforce House, 4 Park Road, Gosforth Business Park, Newcastle upon Tyne, NE12 8DG.
- Director: Vacant
- Website: www.christian.org.uk

The Christian Institute (CI) is a charity operating in the United Kingdom, promoting a conservative evangelical Christian viewpoint, founded on a belief in Biblical inerrancy. The CI is a registered charity. The group does not report numbers of staff, volunteers or members with only the former director, Colin Hart, listed as a representative. Hart died in March 2024, leaving the directorship vacant. According to the accounts and trustees' annual report for the financial year ending 2017, the average head count of employees during the year was 48 (2016:46).

While the CI has campaigned on issues including gambling, abortion and euthanasia, it is most notable for its campaigns against homosexuality and gay rights. The CI sought to retain Section 28 and a higher age of consent for gay and bisexual men, and opposed the Civil Partnership Act, the Marriage (Same Sex Couples) Act 2013 and legislation allowing same-gender couples to adopt. It has opposed measures to prevent gay people being discriminated against in the provision of services and goods. The Civil Partnership Act 2004, the Marriage (Same Sex Couples) Act 2013 and the Equality Act 2010 were ultimately enacted by Parliament.

The Christian Institute's activities were criticised by the Charity Commission in 2001, for breaching rules limiting overt political campaigning by charities, by publishing a 100-page report, Homosexuality and Young People (1998), which argued against reforming anti-homosexual law from a purely political viewpoint.

In 2004, the CI funded a full-page newspaper advertisement in The Times in support of a controversial amendment to the Civil Partnership Bill. The amendment attempted to include within the scope of the Bill siblings who had lived together for longer than 12 years. The amendment was ultimately rejected in both Houses of Parliament. In response to the advertisement, Members of Parliament questioned the CI's overt political campaigning in light of its charitable status.

== Legal actions ==
In 2000, the CI became the only group to initiate a court case for an alleged breach of the now defunct Section 28. The case failed.

In 2007, the CI and others unsuccessfully sought a judicial review of the Sexual Orientation Regulations in Northern Ireland.

In May 2008, the CI funded the legal costs of Lillian Ladele, a registrar from Islington, London, who took her employer, Islington London Borough Council, to the London Central Employment Tribunal. Ladele had refused to process the paperwork associated with civil partnerships on religious grounds, and following complaints from other staff she was disciplined under the Council's Fairness for All policy. Ladele claimed she had been subject to direct and indirect discrimination, and harassment in the workplace, on grounds of her religion. In July 2008, the tribunal found in Ladele's favour; however this ruling was overturned by the Employment Appeal Tribunal in December, 2008. The CI later launched an unsuccessful appeal against this ruling in the High Court, and has been refused permission to appeal to the Supreme Court.

In 2010, the CI funded the defence of two Christian hotel owners accused of acting unlawfully under the Equality Act (Sexual Orientation) Regulations, by refusing to let a same-gender couple in a civil partnership stay in a double room reserved for married couples. The owners lost both the case and the subsequent appeal.

In 2015 and 2016 CI was part of the No to Named Person (NO2NP) coalition that campaigned against the "named person" scheme in Scotland, the attempt by the Scottish Government to introduce legislation creating a single point of contact for each child, with privileged access to data about that child. NO2NP argued that this would "[undermine] parents and permits the state unlimited access to pry into the privacy of families in their homes" and would stretch child protection resources. The arguments were dismissed by the Court of Session in Edinburgh in 2015. After hearing an appeal in March 2016, the UK Supreme Court stated that the proposed legislation would breach the rights to privacy and a family life under the European Convention on Human Rights, and ruled that the proposal could not be implemented in this form. On 19 September 2019 the Scottish Education Secretary, John Swinney, confirmed that the Scottish Government will withdraw the named person legislation.
