= Lance Nielsen =

English screenwriter and playwright (born 1974)

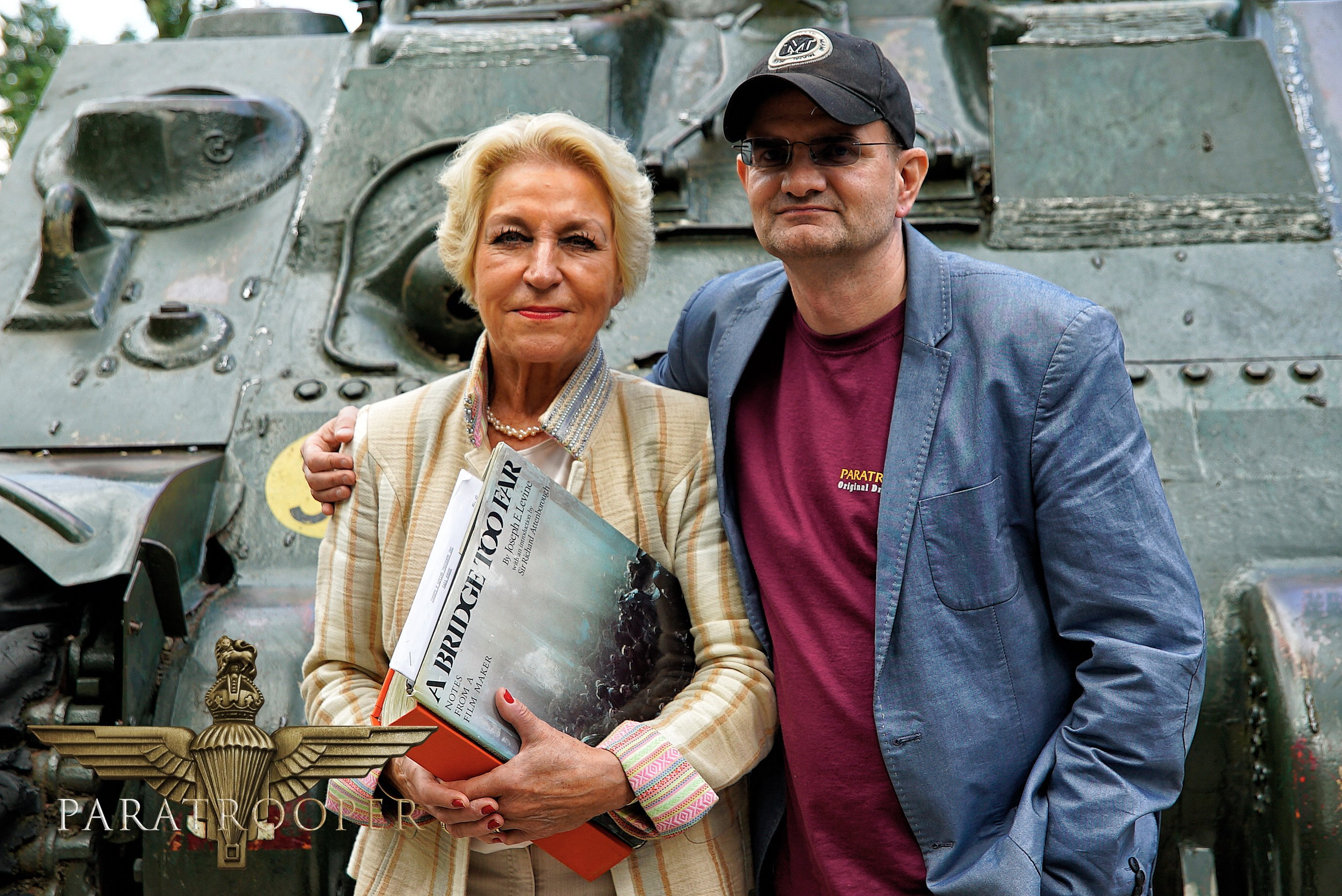
Lance Nielsen with Reinke Krammer - PA to Richard Attenborough - A Bridge Too Far

Lance Nielsen (born 1974) is an English screenwriter and playwright. He has directed much of his own work.

== Biography ==
Nielsen was brought up near Kingston upon Thames in South London. Nielsen's interest in the media began with acting in school and college theatre productions. He trained at the Epsom School of Art and Design, in Surrey.

== Early work ==
Nielsen's early work began in Nottingham, at the same time as when fellow film director Shane Meadows began directing low-budget film projects. Nielsen's first film, Death Comes From The Touch Of The Funnyman was loosely based upon his time spent at Esher College. Filming took place over 18 months and used all the real locations where events had actually occurred. The film was shot on a video format, making it unsuitable for broadcasting. He also directed a number of shorts and workshops while in Nottingham with Best Shot Films and assisted with casting and directing a number of other shorts. On his return to London he directed Waiting For Hillsborough about the Hillsborough football disaster. The play secured him 'Best Talent in New Writing', at the Liverpool Arts and Entertainment Awards.

Nielsen moved back to North London in September 1997, and his work began to focus on theatre. He quickly became the writer in residence at the North London arts venue, the Jacksons Lane Theatre, writing and directing two plays a year for the next six years under The Gutted Film and Theatre Company. These included several award-winning productions, among them 11 Years Down the River – The Marchioness Inquiry, Those Who Trespass Against Us – The Victoria Climbie Inquiry, and Sticks and Stones, which was a drama set against the conflict in Northern Ireland. The comedy short play Making Time went on to win a Peter Brook award.

== Taking a break ==
In an interview given to the Irish Post, Nielsen announced he intended to take a break from heavy drama, he wrote some comedies and then he turned his hand to musicals writing and directing The East End of Chicago, a musical comedy drama set in the 1920s. The music for the show was written by Richard Erickson. During the production Nielsen was experiencing severe headaches and vomiting. Shortly after the production Nielsen collapsed with a stroke and fit which hospitalised him for three months. It was discovered he had a large blood clot in his brain which left him with minor brain damage and some memory loss. His doctor told him to avoid stress and he did not direct again for two years.

== Recent work ==
Nielsen directed two plays with Tom Hardy's Shotgun Theatre Company in 2006 and early 2007 respectively and wrote Pressure, the documentary drama about the life of Colin Stagg. This is loosely based on a script he wrote six years earlier for the theatre, which even back then advanced the proposition that Stagg was entirely innocent of the offences he was then accused of. Nielsen was also involved in another production with actors Dan Styles and Gideon Turner called Jericho's Walls Are Falling, which he also wrote and directed. Dan Styles was also the producer of the trailer. Although the trailer was produced, funding for the film was found and lost five times during the Great Recession and it is now in turnaround. Jericho was wrongly called The Band Plays again in an interview on line.

Nielsen directed two plays in 2010, 12 Angry Women, with an all female, all ethnic cast, which was a success and Fragile, co-written by Angela Thomas. Fragile was a financial and critical failure. After this Nielsen briefly left the industry, but in February 2012 was invited by his friend Chris Jones, to attend a weekend of the Guerrilla Filmmakers Network that he was running, which resulted in him meeting Greek film makers Carmen Zografou, Iria Pizania, Kyriaki Fotiadou, Angela Angelidis and Ioanna Petinaraki. The six of them began producing The Journey, which Nielsen was already writing for actor Jason Flemyng. Nielsen also wrote a short for the 48-hour Sci-Fi Challenge, 'By The Lake', which was produced by Adele Kirby. He wrote two other scripts in 2012, "The Last Submarine" and "Gaddafi", which is about the last 90 minutes of the life of the former Libyan dictator. Nielsen directed a short about Londoners views on Gaddafi in August 2012. He wrote the screenplay of "We Are Home", a drama based on the events that led to the underdog Zambian football team winning the African Cup of Nations in 2012. The script includes the background of the Zambian Air Disaster of 1993.

Nielsen is also making a short documentary about the life of Danny Nicoletta who found fame himself by his association with Harvey Milk in San Francisco. He is also making a documentary about the life of Cameron Adams, who is better known as Cameron Bay, the porn star infected with HIV. He has completed shooting The Journey with actors Duncan Pow, Dickon Tolson, Mitchell Lewis, Marc Zammit, Lindsey Coulson and Jason Flemyng. The cast also includes Mitchell Lewis in his first major role since Rise of the Footsoldier and Velile Tshabalala from Doctor Who in her first big screen role.

In 2016, Nielsen commenced pre-production on the war film Pegasus Bridge about the capture of the Caen canal and Orne river bridges on 6 June 1944, as part of the Normandy landings during the Second World War.

== Dedications ==
Nielsen is known for dedicating his work to friends or actors whom he admires. Many of his dedications have been for people who have inspired him, some of whom have died. He has made dedications to regular collaborators Danny Webb and Jason Flemyng. Two of Nielsen's plays have been dedicated to Rebecca Holland. His play Making Time was dedicated to the actress Charlotte Coleman, one of the stars of the movie Four Weddings and a Funeral. He dedicated The Marchioness Inquiry to Michael Williams; along with his own established acting career Williams is known for being the husband of Dame Judi Dench. Williams met Nielsen earlier in his career at Shepperton Film studios and encouraged him to pursue his writing. Nielsen was also good friends with actress Angela Thomas. Thomas, who had asked Nielsen to co-write both a book and a play based on her life, died on 24 July 2009 of a brain aneurism. Nielsen was one of the friends present during her time in hospital where she fought for but ultimately lost her life over a three-day period. In 2010, Nielsen produced their unfinished play, Fragile, which he had to complete without her. It was not a success. The film The Journey is also dedicated to Thomas, and a character loosely based upon her appears briefly in the film, played by actress Charlene Collins.
