= Victims and Witnesses (Scotland) Act 2014 =

Act of the Scottish Parliament

Victims and Witnesses (Scotland) Act 2014 (Note: Section 35.)
- Act of the Scottish Parliament
- Scottish Parliament
- Long title: An Act of the Scottish Parliament to make provision for certain rights and support for victims and witnesses, including provision for implementing Directive 2012/29/EU of the European Parliament and the Council; and to make provision for the establishment of a committee of the Mental Welfare Commission with functions relating to persons who were placed in institutional care as children.
- Citation: 2014 asp 1
- Introduced by: Kenny MacAskill MSP
- Territorial extent: Scotland

Dates
- Royal assent: 17 January 2014
- Commencement: 18 January 2014 (in part); 13 August 2014; 30 January 2015; 1 July 2015; 1 September 2015; (Note: Section 34.)

Other legislation
- Amends: Criminal Procedure (Scotland) Act 1995
- Transposes: Directive 2012/29/EU

Status: Current legislation

History of passage through the Parliament

Text of statute as originally enacted

Text of the Victims and Witnesses (Scotland) Act 2014 as in force today (including any amendments) within the United Kingdom, from legislation.gov.uk.

The Victims and Witnesses (Scotland) Act 2014 (asp 1) is an act of the Scottish Parliament which passed through the legislative body in 2013 and received Royal Assent on 17 January 2014. It brought into law a number of changes to modify the experience victims and witnesses have within Scotland's justice system.

== Legislative passage ==
The bill creating the act was introduced to Parliament on 13 February 2013 by Kenny MacAskill MSP and received royal assent on 17 January 2014, creating the Victims and Witnesses (Scotland) Act 2014. Parts of the act came into force the following day, 18 January 2014, with the remainder being introduced gradually between August 2014 and September 2015, although the act does not yet apply to cases in Justice of the Peace courts.

== Purpose ==
The goal of the legislation was to improve the experiences of victims of crime and witnesses in the justice system.

== Provisions ==
This act made provisions for:

- creating a duty for justice organisations to set clear standards of service for victims and witnesses
- giving victims and witnesses new rights to certain information about their case
- improving support for vulnerable witnesses in court – for example, changing the definition of 'child witness' to include all those under 18 (instead of under 16), and creating a presumption that certain categories of victim are vulnerable, and giving such victims the right to utilise certain special measures when giving evidence
- introducing a victim surcharge so that offenders contribute to the cost of supporting victims
- introducing restitution orders, allowing the court to require that offenders who assault police officers pay to support the specialist non-NHS services which assist in the recovery of such individuals
- allowing victims to make oral representations about the release of life sentence prisoners.

== Reception ==
Speaking on behalf of Labour, Jenny Marra criticised the legislation for not introducing case companions.
