= List of acts of the Scottish Parliament from 2014 =

This is a list of acts of the Scottish Parliament passed in 2014. Acts of the Scottish Parliament are enacted by the Scottish Parliament, which has legislative authority over devolved matters in relation to Scotland under the authority of the Scotland Act 1998. Acts are cited by calendar year, in the same fashion as acts of Parliament of the United Kingdom. Each act passed in a respective year is numbered consecutively with Arabic numerals, following the prefix "asp".

19 acts of the Scottish Parliament were passed in 2014.

indicates that an act has been transcribed on Wikisource, indicates that an act is available to view at legislation.gov.uk, and indicates the location of the original act in the Parliamentary Archives.

== Acts of the Scottish Parliament ==
Short title	Citation	Royal assent
Long title
Victims and Witnesses (Scotland) Act 2014	2014 asp 1	17 January 2014
An Act of the Scottish Parliament to make provision for certain rights and support for victims and witnesses, including provision for implementing Directive 2012/29/EU (Note: Victims' Rights Directive (2012/29/EU)) of the European Parliament and the Council; and to make provision for the establishment of a committee of the Mental Welfare Commission with functions relating to persons who were placed in institutional care as children.
Landfill Tax (Scotland) Act 2014	2014 asp 2	21 January 2014
An Act of the Scottish Parliament to make provision about the taxation of disposals to landfill.
Regulatory Reform (Scotland) Act 2014	2014 asp 3	19 February 2014
An Act of the Scottish Parliament to enable provision to be made for the purpose of promoting regulatory consistency; to make provision in relation to primary authorities; to enable provision to be made, and to make provision, as respects regulatory activities, and offences, relating to the environment; to make provision about regulatory functions relating to marine licensing, planning and street traders' licences; and for connected purposes.
Burrell Collection (Lending and Borrowing) (Scotland) Act 2014	2014 asp 4	25 February 2014
An Act of the Scottish Parliament to provide Glasgow City Council with additional powers to lend, including lending overseas, any items forming part of the Burrell Collection and to receive items on loan from others in both cases with agreement of the charity trustees of the Sir William Burrell Trust in accordance with a published code.
Marriage and Civil Partnership (Scotland) Act 2014	2014 asp 5	12 March 2014
An Act of the Scottish Parliament to make provision for the marriage of persons of the same sex; to make further provision as to the persons who may solemnise marriage and as to marriage procedure and the places at which civil marriages may be solemnised; to make provision for the registration of civil partnerships by celebrants of religious or belief bodies; to make provision about gender change by married persons and civil partners; to make a minor correction in relation to registration information; and for connected purposes.
Budget (Scotland) Act 2014	2014 asp 6	12 March 2014
An Act of the Scottish Parliament to make provision, for financial year 2014/15, for the use of resources by the Scottish Administration and certain bodies whose expenditure is payable out of the Scottish Consolidated Fund, for the maximum amounts of borrowing by certain statutory bodies and for authorising the payment of sums out of the Fund; to make provision, for financial year 2015/16, for authorising the payment of sums out of the Fund on a temporary basis; and for connected purposes.
City of Edinburgh Council (Leith Links and Surplus Fire Fund) Act 2014	2014 asp 7	27 March 2014
An Act of the Scottish Parliament to amend the City of Edinburgh District Council Order Confirmation Act 1991 (Note: City of Edinburgh District Council Order Confirmation Act 1991 (c. xix)) to create an exception to the prohibition on the construction of monuments on Leith Links; to amend the purposes for which the Surplus Fire Fund may be used; to transfer the property, rights, interests and liabilities of the Surplus Fire Fund to a successor charitable trust and then dissolve the Surplus Fire Fund; and for connected purposes.
Children and Young People (Scotland) Act 2014	2014 asp 8	27 March 2014
An Act of the Scottish Parliament to make provision about the rights of children and young people; to make provision about investigations by the Commissioner for Children and Young People in Scotland; to make provision for and about the provision of services and support for or in relation to children and young people; to make provision for an adoption register; to make provision about children's hearings, detention in secure accommodation and consultation on certain proposals in relation to schools; and for connected purposes.
Public Bodies (Joint Working) (Scotland) Act 2014	2014 asp 9	1 April 2014
An Act of the Scottish Parliament to make provision in relation to the carrying out of functions of local authorities and Health Boards; to make further provision about certain functions of public bodies; to make further provision in relation to certain functions under the National Health Service (Scotland) Act 1978; (Note: National Health Service (Scotland) Act 1978 (c. 29)) and for connected purposes.
Tribunals (Scotland) Act 2014	2014 asp 10	15 April 2014
An Act of the Scottish Parliament to establish the First-tier Tribunal for Scotland and the Upper Tribunal for Scotland; and for connected purposes.
Bankruptcy and Debt Advice (Scotland) Act 2014	2014 asp 11	29 April 2014
An Act of the Scottish Parliament to amend the Bankruptcy (Scotland) Act 1985; (Note: Bankruptcy (Scotland) Act 1985 (c. 66)) and for connected purposes.
Procurement Reform (Scotland) Act 2014	2014 asp 12	13 May 2014
An Act of the Scottish Parliament to make provision about the procedures relating to the award of certain public contracts; to require certain authorities to produce procurement strategies and annual reports; and for connected purposes.
Buildings (Recovery of Expenses) (Scotland) Act 2014	2014 asp 13	24 July 2014
An Act of the Scottish Parliament to amend the Building (Scotland) Act 2003 (Note: Building (Scotland) Act 2003 (asp 8)) to provide for expenses incurred by local authorities in connection with notices served or work carried out under that Act to be recovered by way of charging order.
Housing (Scotland) Act 2014	2014 asp 14	1 August 2014
An Act of the Scottish Parliament to make provision about housing, including provision about the abolition of the right to buy, social housing, the law affecting private housing, the regulation of letting agents and the licensing of sites for mobile homes.
City of Edinburgh Council (Portobello Park) Act 2014	2014 asp 15	1 August 2014
An Act of the Scottish Parliament to change the status of Portobello Park so as to permit the City of Edinburgh Council to appropriate it for the purposes of the Council's functions as an education authority; and for connected purposes.
Revenue Scotland and Tax Powers Act 2014	2014 asp 16	24 September 2014
An Act of the Scottish Parliament to establish Revenue Scotland; to establish Scottish tax tribunals; to put in place a general anti-avoidance rule; to make provision about the collection and management of devolved taxes; and for connected purposes.
Disabled Persons' Parking Badges (Scotland) Act 2014	2014 asp 17	24 September 2014
An Act of the Scottish Parliament to make provision about badges for display on motor vehicles used by disabled persons.
Courts Reform (Scotland) Act 2014	2014 asp 18	10 November 2014
An Act of the Scottish Parliament to make provision about the sheriff courts; to establish a Sheriff Appeal Court; to make provision about civil court procedure; to make provision about appeals in civil proceedings; to make provision about appeals in criminal proceedings; to make provision about judges of the Court of Session; to make provision about the Scottish Land Court; to make provision about justice of the peace courts; to rename the Scottish Court Service and give it functions in relation to tribunals; to provide for assistants to the Judicial Appointments Board for Scotland; and for connected purposes.
Historic Environment Scotland Act 2014	2014 asp 19	9 December 2014
An Act of the Scottish Parliament to establish Historic Environment Scotland; to make minor amendments to the law relating to the historic environment; and for connected purposes.

== See also ==
- List of acts of the Scottish Parliament
