= Children and Young People (Scotland) Act 2014 =

Act of the Scottish Parliament

Children and Young People (Scotland) Act 2014 (Note: Section 103.)
- Act of the Scottish Parliament
- Scottish Parliament
- Long title: An Act of the Scottish Parliament to make provision about the rights of children and young people; to make provision about investigations by the Commissioner for Children and Young People in Scotland; to make provision for and about the provision of services and support for or in relation to children and young people; to make provision for an adoption register; to make provision about children’s hearings, detention in secure accommodation and consultation on certain proposals in relation to schools; and for connected purposes.
- Citation: 2014 asp 8
- Introduced by: Alex Neil MSP
- Territorial extent: Scotland

Dates
- Royal assent: 27 March 2014
- Commencement: 28 March 2014; 28 June 2014; 1 August 2014; 6 October 2014; 5 January 2015; 9 January 2015; 26 January 2015; 1 April 2015; 30 March 2015; 15 June 2015; 30 September 2015; 1 February 2016; 31 August 2016; 7 October 2016; 28 November 2016; 1 April 2017; 7 August 2017

Other legislation
- Amends: Education (Scotland) Act 1980; Legal Aid (Scotland) Act 1986; Criminal Procedure (Scotland) Act 1995; Education Act 1996
- Relates to: Commissioner for Children and Young People (Scotland) Act 2003

Status: Amended

History of passage through the Parliament

Text of statute as originally enacted

Revised text of statute as amended

Text of the Children and Young People (Scotland) Act 2014 as in force today (including any amendments) within the United Kingdom, from legislation.gov.uk.

The Children and Young People (Scotland) Act 2014 (asp 8) is an act of the Scottish Parliament passed on 19 February 2014 and received royal assent on 27 March 2014. The legislation is part of the Scottish Government's Getting it right for every child policy implementation.

The scope of the act as described in its long title is to make provision:

- about the rights of children and young people;
- about investigations by the Commissioner for Children and Young People in Scotland;
- about the provision of services and support for or in relation to children and young people:
- for and about an adoption register;
- about children’s hearings, detention in secure accommodation and consultation on certain proposals in relation to schools.

In the course of legal proceedings on the part of the Christian Institute and others who were concerned with information privacy law, and who challenged provisions of the act, the judgments of the Court of Session in Edinburgh and, on appeal, of the Supreme Court in Westminster referred to the Data Protection Act 1998, the EU Data Protection Directive, and the European Convention on Human Rights. The Court of Session upheld the provisions of the act, but was overruled by the Supreme Court's decision that the provisions were defective and were not in the Parliament's legislative competence, and therefore could not be brought into force.

== Key provisions ==
The key provisions of the act include:

- The introduction of specific and continuing duties on the Scottish Ministers for maintaining and improving Scotland's compliance with the United Nations Convention on the Rights of the Child.
- Certain public bodies such as local authorities, health boards and the police (among others) must report every three years on what action they have taken to promote the rights of children and young people.
- The creation of a new Complaints and Investigation Service to support the work of the Commissioner for Children and Young People.
- The institution of a 'named person service', for which an individual is to be identified and made available in respect of every child in Scotland until they reach age 18.
- Provides public funding for free school meals for school pupils in P1-3.

A government document published in June 2014 described the Scottish Government’s overarching plans for implementing the Act and stated that the named person provisions in Part 4 were then currently focused on developing guidance in relation to the "GIRFEC" approach.

== Legal challenge ==
The Act has generated controversy, and in The Christian Institute and others (Appellants) v The Lord Advocate ([2016] UKSC 51), the Supreme Court of the United Kingdom ruled that certain data sharing provisions of the Act were in breach of the right to respect for private and family life prescribed in Article 8 of the European Convention on Human Rights, meaning the Scottish Parliament must amend the Act in order for it to become law. The Scottish Conservatives and Scottish Liberal Democrats have called for the Act to be repealed and Scottish Labour, whilst initially supportive of the Act, have called for a 'pause'. A Survation poll has found that 64% of Scottish adults are opposed to the Named Person provisions of the Act.

The appeal to the Supreme Court was from the Opinion of the Inner House of the Court of Session (delivered 3 September 2015) on a reclaiming motion ([2015] CSIH 64) between seven parties as petitioners and reclaimers, namely, The Christian Institute, Family Education Trust, The Young Me Sufferers ("TYMES"), Christian Action Research and Education ("CARE") (four registered charities with an interest in family matters), and three individual parents, against The Scottish Ministers as respondent. The Inner House refused an appeal from Lord Pentland's decision, as Lord Ordinary. Lord Pentland had refused a petition for judicial review (lodged 11 July 2014), holding that the named person service provisions in Part 4 of the 2014 Act were within the devolved competence of the Scottish Parliament and did not contravene fundamental common law rights, or the European Convention, or the EU law on data protection.

The Opinion of the Inner House, which the Supreme Court's judgment overruled, was that the legislation was in accordance with the law, had a legitimate aim and was necessary in a democratic society in the interests of, amongst other things, public safety, the prevention of crime, the protection of health or morals or of the rights of others. The Inner House's Opinion was based on observing that the legislation was intended to provide for every child a suitably qualified professional able, if necessary, to act as a single point of contact with any public service from which the child could benefit, and that this would have no effect whatsoever on the legal, moral or social relationships within the family, and, further, that the legislation did not involve the state taking over any functions currently carried out by parents in relation to their children, and would not permit any interference with a parent’s or child’s right to freedom of thought, conscience and religion, nor bear upon a child’s right to education or his parents' right to bring up a child according to his conscience and religion.

=== Possible remedy under Scotland Act 1998 ===
The proceedings and judgments were mainly concerned with provisions in Part 4 of the Children and Young People (Scotland) Act 2014, including ten sections that had not then been brought into force under section 102, namely,

- s.20 Named person service in relation to pre-school child.
- s.21 Named person service in relation to children not falling within section 20.
- s.22 Continuation of named person service in relation to certain young people.
- s.23 Communication in relation to movement of children and young people.
- s.24 Duty to communicate information about role of named persons.
- s.25 Duty to help named person.
- s.26 Information sharing.
- s.27 Disclosure of information.
- s.28 Guidance in relation to named person service.
- s.29 Directions in relation to named person service.

When allowing the appeal, the Supreme Court, following the precedent of its ruling in Salvesen v Riddell ([2013] UKSC 22), invited the parties to produce, within the period of 42 days from 28 July (expiring in early September), written submissions on the terms of an order that the Court could make under 102(2)(b) of the Scotland Act 1998 to allow the Scottish Parliament and the Scottish Ministers an opportunity to correct the defects which the Court had identified, but the Court stated that in the meantime, since the defective provisions were not within the legislative competence of the Parliament, they could not be brought into force.

=== Government's September announcement ===
The Scottish Government announced on 8 September a process involving the offices of the Children's Commissioner and the Information Commissioner in order to address the concerns raised by the Supreme Court, including development of a code of practice to set out how information should be shared under the legislation, with the intention of working towards a commencement date for the legislation of August 2017.
