= Ian Willmore =

British activist (1958–2020)

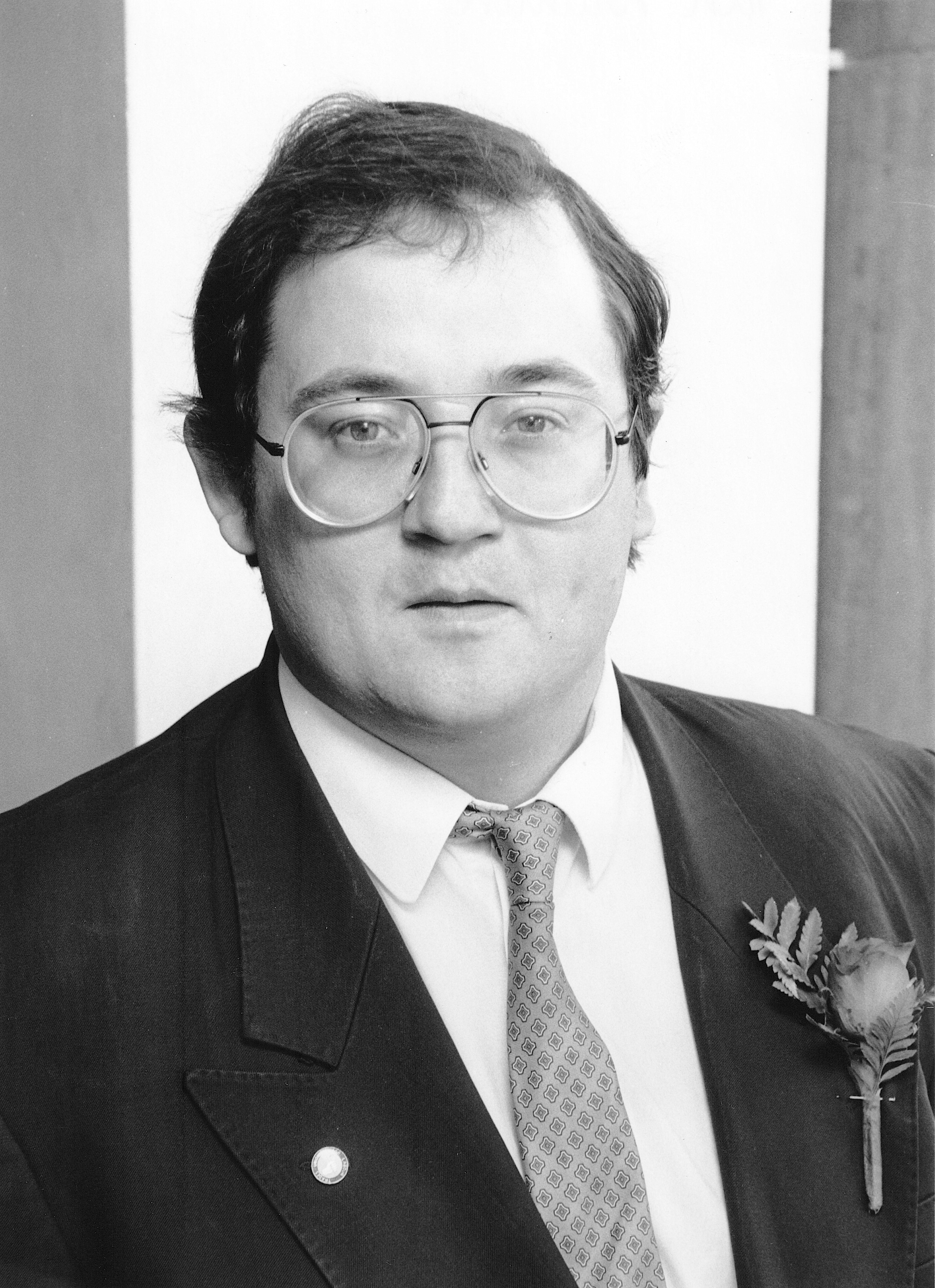
Portrait of Ian Willmore UK activist and campaigner

Ian Willmore (5 November 1958 – 7 April 2020), was a British activist who played a leading role in defending the independence of the civil service in the 1980s. He also campaigned for legislation to ban smoking in public places and standardised packaging of tobacco products.

== Biography ==
Willmore was born in Cardiff on 5 November 1958 to parents Oliver Willmore (architect) and Anne (née Burnell). He died following a heart attack on 7 April 2020.

== Career ==
After Marlborough College, he studied Philosophy and Theology at Oriel College, Oxford before joining the Civil Service as an administrative trainee at the Department of Employment.

In December 1983 he leaked a memorandum to Time Out which included information about advice the Master of the Rolls, Sir John Donaldson, had given advice to Michael Quinlan, the Permanent Secretary in the Department of Employment, on the future of the law relating to industrial relations. He took this action because he believed this was cynical government interference in the traditional independence of Civil Service departments amounting to constitutional subversion, which he believed should be made public. The leak was widely covered by the media and, having admitted his part and resigned, Willmore explained his motivation on Granada TV's World in Action.

The Attorney-General, Sir Michael Havers QC, decided against prosecuting Willmore, saying that Section 2 should be used sparingly and only when absolutely necessary. The case has been recognised as one of the most notable 20th century cases involving official secrets legislation or leaks of government information.

Willmore then campaigned on youth unemployment for YouthAid, before working for the Transport and General Workers Union from 1985 to 1991. He wrote General Secretary Ron Todd's controversial speech to the Tribune rally at the 1988 Labour Party conference, which with its finger-pointing at 'Filofax-wielding modernisers' grabbed front-page headlines.

A long-standing member of the Labour Party, Willmore was a Haringey Councillor for South Tottenham Ward between 1988 and 1997, and held positions including Deputy Leader and Chair of Finance. He stood for parliament twice as a Labour candidate, in South West Hertfordshire in 1987 and in Braintree in 1992. He worked for Labour MP and shadow cabinet minister Michael Meacher from 1994 to 1997 and then as head of Friends of the Earth's press office from 1997 to 2003, where he turned his colleagues' academic research into press releases that would gain tabloid coverage.

== Smoke-free campaigning ==
He joined Action on Smoking and Health (ASH) in 2003 as Media and Campaigns Manager, where he played an important role in the campaign for smoke-free laws to include pubs and clubs, won on a free vote in parliament in 2006 and implemented in England in 2007. The legislation led to a significant reduction in heart attacks (MI) resulting in 1,200 fewer emergency admissions for MI in the year following the introduction of smokefree legislation. There was also a significant increase in the number of people making an attempt to give up smoking at the time the legislation was implemented (July and August 2007), equivalent to 300,000 smokers in England trying to quit. A study of bar workers in England showed that their exposure to second-hand smoke reduced on average between 73% and 91% and measures of their respiratory health significantly improved after the introduction of the legislation. UK public health experts voted it the greatest UK public health achievement of the 21st century.

Willmore returned to work for ASH on a part-time consultancy basis and played a key role in the campaign for legislation to require standardised cigarette packaging. Having consulted on standardised packaging, David Cameron's government had decided not to proceed[], until a group of cross-party backbench peers tabled an amendment requiring standardised packaging to the Children and Families Bill going through parliament in 2013. Like the smokefree laws, the legislation was achieved, with Willmore's help, on a free vote in parliament. When the tobacco manufacturers took forward a judicial review challenging the legislation, ASH acted as an intervener in support of the Government. The lawyers Sean Humber at solicitors Leigh Day, who instructed barristers Peter Oliver and Ligia Osepciu from Monckton Chambers, acted pro bono for ASH. Willmore drafted the detailed brief for the lawyers and attended every day of the court case. The judgement found overwhelmingly against the tobacco manufacturers and the legislation was implemented in 2017.

== Projects and Interests ==
Willmore had many interests alongside politics. He was a jazz pianist and chess player.

== Publications ==
He wrote many articles for the national and political press. Most notable were his accounts of the Climbie affair and the subsequent inquiry, and what he saw as the establishment's search for scapegoats, 'An evasion of responsibility' and 'Passing the Buck'.

During his time as Media Coordinator of Friends of the Earth Willmore wrote a monthly column on environmental issues for the Observer website.

He was co-author of articles analysing how the campaign for smokefree legislation in England achieved success.
