= Joanna Dodson =

British barrister (1945–2020)

Joanna Dodson QC
- Born: 5 September 1945
- Died: 23 August 2020 (aged 74)
- Occupation: Barrister

Joanna Dodson QC (5 September 1945 – 23 August 2020) was a British barrister, specialising in family law.

Dodson began her career at the chambers of Anthony Gifford QC and of Michael Mansfield QC, before becoming Head of Chambers at Fourteen (14 Gray's Inn Square); she ended her career at 33 Bedford Row. Having been called to the bar (qualified as a barrister) in 1971, she took silk (appointed Queen's Counsel) in 1993. Among notable cases, she represented the parents of Victoria Climbié at the associated public inquiry, and the children of the appellant in ZH (Tanzania) v Secretary of State for the Home Office [2011]. She was named among the top recipients of legal aid in 2004 and 2005. She was a graduate of Newnham College, Cambridge University.
