= Housing (Scotland) Act 2014 =

Act of the Scottish Parliament

Housing (Scotland) Act 2014 (Note: Section 105.)
- Act of the Scottish Parliament
- Scottish Parliament
- Long title: An Act of the Scottish Parliament to make provision about housing, including provision about the abolition of the right to buy, social housing, the law affecting private housing, the regulation of letting agents and the licensing of sites for mobile homes.
- Citation: 2014 asp 14
- Introduced by: Nicola Sturgeon MSP
- Territorial extent: Scotland

Dates
- Royal assent: 1 August 2014
- Commencement: various (Note: Section 104.)

Other legislation
- Amends: Crofters (Scotland) Act 1993; Scottish Public Services Ombudsman Act 2002

Status: Amended

History of passage through the Parliament

Text of statute as originally enacted

Revised text of statute as amended

Text of the Housing (Scotland) Act 2014 as in force today (including any amendments) within the United Kingdom, from legislation.gov.uk.

The Housing (Scotland) Act 2014 (asp 14) is an act of the Scottish Parliament.

== Provisions ==
=== Right to buy ===
The act abolished the right to buy.

=== Assignation and sub-letting ===
The act required tenants to seek their landlords' permission to be able to pass their tenancy to someone else, known as assignation.

=== Improving standards in rented accommodation ===
The act allows local authorities to establish "enhanced enforcement areas" where they have a right of entry to rented properties where there have been complaints relating to the way that they are being managed.

== Reception ==
The Scottish Federation of Housing Associations supported the end to the right to buy.

Mary Fee, a Labour MSP, described the legislation as a "missed opportunity".

== Implementation ==
The end to the right to buy was implemented in 2016.

The changes to assignation took effect in November 2019.
