= Murder of Daniel Pełka =

2012 murder in England

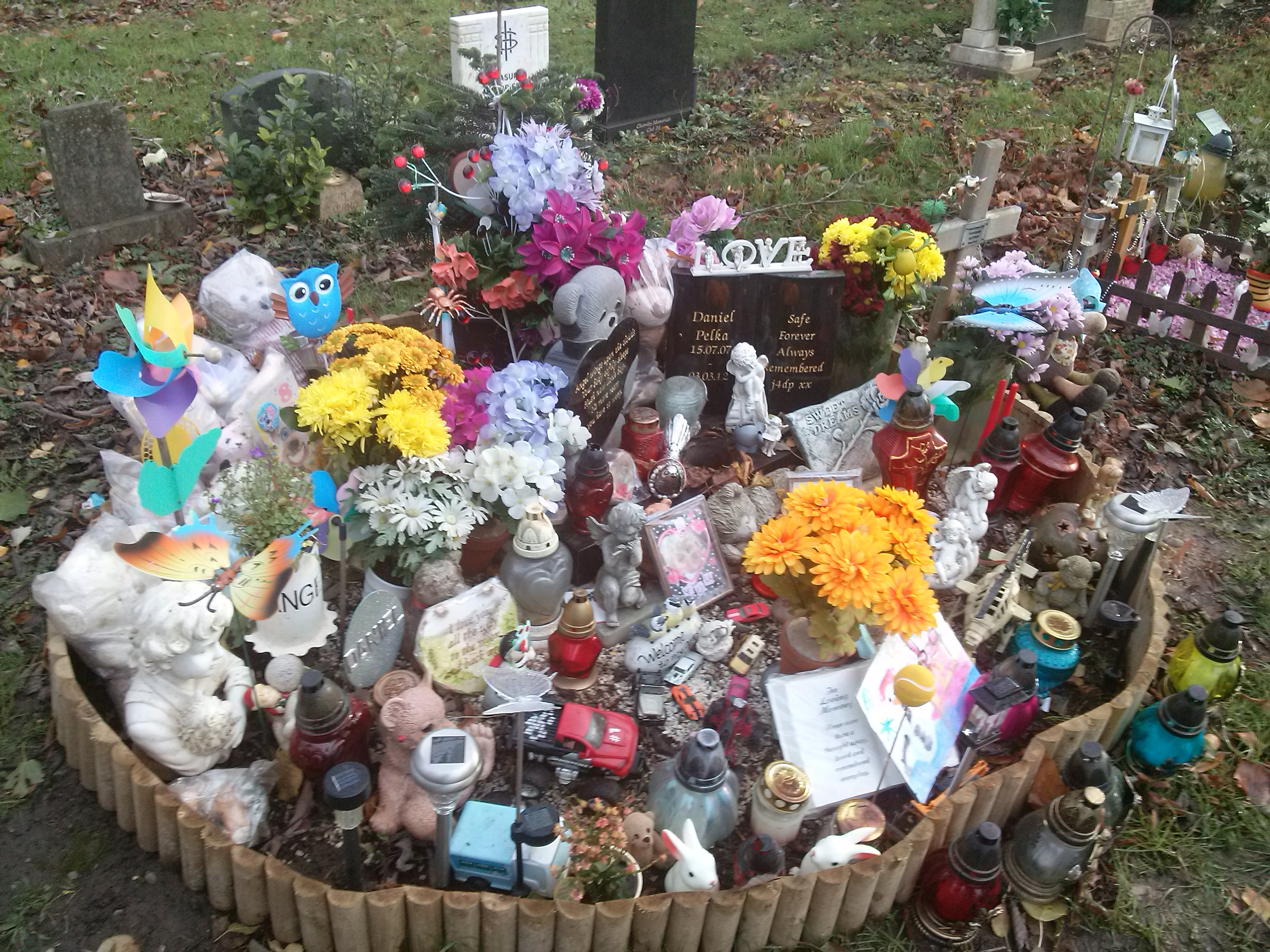
- Pełka's symbolic grave at St. Paul's burial ground, Foleshill, Coventry
- Location: Coventry, England
- Date: 3 March 2012; 3:50 (GMT)
- Attack type: Child murder by beating, filicide, child abuse
- Victim: Daniel Pełka
- Perpetrators: Mariusz Krężołek; Magdalena Łuczak
- Verdict: Guilty on both counts
- Convictions: Murder, child cruelty
- Sentence: Life imprisonment with the possibility of parole after 30 years

Daniel Pełka
- Born: 15 July 2007; Coventry, England, UK
- Died: 3 March 2012 (aged 4); Coventry, England, UK
- Cause of death: Murder (brain injury)
- Resting place: Evangelical Augsburg Cemetery in Zgierz; Zgierz County, Łódź Voivodeship, Poland
- Monuments: Coventry, England, UK
- Occupation: Preschool student
- Known for: Child abuse victim
- Parent(s): Mariusz Krężołek (stepfather); Magdalena Łuczak (mother); Eryk Pełka (biological father)

The murder of Daniel Pełka, aged 4, occurred on 3 March 2012 in Coventry, England, United Kingdom. His mother, Magdalena Łuczak (27), and her partner, Mariusz Krężołek (33), were found guilty of the murder on 31 July 2013. Daniel's death made headlines for months, as it was evident that a number of opportunities had been missed to identify him as suffering severe child abuse. On 2 August 2013, both Łuczak and Krężołek were jailed for life with a minimum sentence of 30 years each. However, both perpetrators died in prison within three years of being sentenced, with Łuczak committing suicide, and Krężołek dying from a heart attack.

== Background ==
Eryk Pełka (Daniel's biological father) and his partner, Magdalena Łuczak, migrated to England from their native Poland at the end of 2005. Daniel was born in Coventry, England, on 15 July 2007. Eryk remained with the family until the end of 2008. Eryk said that Łuczak was frequently intoxicated and violent towards him. She had very low English proficiency. Eryk Pełka and Magdalena Łuczak separated permanently in 2008. In 2010, Mariusz Krężołek moved in with Łuczak. He was residing in the household at the time of Daniel's death. Daniel had attended Little Heath Primary School.

== Abuse ==
In January 2011, Daniel was taken to A&E with a broken arm and multiple bruises. Although social services investigated, the attending doctor suggested that the fracture could have been caused by an accident. In November 2011, Daniel's teachers at Little Heath expressed concern to Łuczak about Daniel's obsession with food. They told her he would routinely steal food from fellow students and take multiple pieces of fruit from the classroom's "fruit corner". Łuczak had previously told medical professionals that Daniel would raid the refrigerator at night and hit his stepfather when denied food. A social worker suggested providing Daniel with a snack for his journey to school.

By the start of 2012, the school reported that Daniel was often scavenging food from rubbish bins. His hunger led to alarming incidents, including eating half of a teacher’s birthday cake intended for the entire class, and attempting to eat pancakes that had fallen onto the floor. His lunchbox often contained only half a slice of a ham sandwich and a few loose crisps. Eventually, he got a full sandwich and never failed to finish his lunch. After the school holidays, Daniel showed visible signs of weight loss. One teacher saw fingerprint bruising around Daniel's neck, and staff had also noticed multiple facial bruises. Łuczak and Krężołek claimed that Daniel had an eating disorder.

On 10 February 2012, he was seen by Dr. Chakraborthy after having lost weight. The doctor issued a prescription for worms, and said Daniel appeared thin, but not wasting away. On 28 February, Daniel was observed as being "pasty" with "sunken eyes", and not interacting with other children. People continued to notice his eating out of bins, including on 1 March, the day he would receive the beating that caused his death. In addition to direct concerns about Daniel, social services had been visiting the family since 2008, due to serious domestic violence against Łuczak by Krężołek. However, she said she could protect her children, and Daniel was never interviewed directly.

== Death ==
On 1 March 2012, Daniel was beaten for wetting himself. The following morning, Łuczak searched Google for phrases such as "care – patient in a coma" and "salt poisoning". Krężołek dissuaded Łuczak from calling an ambulance, stating that Daniel would "get over it" and that calling for help would "cause proper [sic] problems".

On the morning of 3 March, a 999 call was placed by Łuczak, who reported that her son was not breathing. Paramedics transported Daniel to hospital, where he was pronounced dead at 3:50 AM GMT. The autopsy revealed 22 different injuries, ten of them to his head. A diagram detailing these injuries was released by West Midlands Police and widely broadcast in the media. The cause of death was ruled to be a brain injury. Daniel was also severely underweight, weighing just 10.4 kilograms (23 lb). Witnesses described him as resembling "a concentration camp victim" and "a seriously ill cancer patient".

Following the investigation, Daniel's body was returned to his father, Eryk Pełka. Initially, Eryk could not afford to fly his son's remains to Poland from the UK, but a Polish funeral firm in London covered the costs. Daniel was buried on 3 September 2013.

== Murder trial ==
Both Krężołek and Łuczak denied committing murder, but admitted to the offence of child cruelty. During the trial, Łuczak claimed that Krężołek would attempt to strangle her if she tried to protect Daniel, and that he would not let her feed him. One of Daniel's siblings gave evidence that Krężołek had tried to drown Daniel in a bath of cold water, and that he was locked in a room and forbidden to use the toilet. Text message evidence showed Łuczak admitting to nearly drowning Daniel, and that they removed the handle to his bedroom door, so that his siblings could not let him out. The jury also heard that he was force-fed salt and made to perform squats as a punishment.

The judge's closing remarks described the cruelty to Daniel as "truly horrific", and his starvation as "unprecedented in this country". She also stated that the culprits "carried out a deliberate and cynical deception of teaching, welfare, and medical personnel, which was designed to conceal what was happening, to prevent any help being provided for Daniel".

== Legacy ==
Daniel's death and the numerous missed opportunities to prevent it caused a "huge sense of public outrage". Members of the public donated over £10,000 to the NSPCC in the boy's memory. Coventry has hosted many gatherings to remember Daniel, with the most recent one held on the six year anniversary of his death.

The case inspired a petition to make it mandatory to report evidence of child abuse. After extensive consultation, the UK government decided not to introduce mandatory reporting, fearing it could create a "needle in a haystack" situation, where reports of extensive evidence of serious abuse would be lost among less credible or less serious reports that had been made, due to fear of legal repercussion. They also noted that countries with mandatory reporting laws did not have a higher rate of child abuse reports.

In 2014, the indie rock band Little Comets released a song called "Salt", accompanied by a YouTube video, dedicated to the memory of Daniel Pełka.

== Deaths of perpetrators ==
On 14 July 2015, Łuczak was found unresponsive in her cell at HM Prison Foston Hall at about 07:15 BST and was pronounced dead. An inquest held three days later revealed that Łuczak had hanged herself.

At about 08:30 on 27 January 2016, Krężołek was found dead in his prison cell at HM Prison Full Sutton. The cause of death was found to be a heart attack. He had refused medical attention due to fear that people would recognise him.

== See also ==
- Killing of Peter Connelly
- Murder of Zachary Turner
- Murder of Maria Colwell
- Murder of Victoria Climbié
- Murder of Sara Sharif
