= Special measures =

Regulation in the United Kingdom

Special measures is a status applied by regulators of public services in Britain to providers who fall short of acceptable standards.

== In education (England and Wales) ==
Ofsted, the schools inspection agency for England and some British Overseas Territories, and Estyn, the schools inspection agency for Wales, apply the term special measures (Welsh: mesurau arbennig) to schools under their jurisdictions when they consider the school has failed to provide an acceptable standard of teaching, has poor facilities, or otherwise fails to meet the minimum standards for education set by the government and other agencies, when they judge the school lacks the leadership capacity amongst its management to ensure improvements. A school subject to special measures will have regular short-notice Ofsted or Estyn inspections to monitor its improvement. The senior managers and teaching staff can be dismissed and the school governors replaced by an appointed executive committee. If poor performance continues the school may be closed; an example was of the Frank Montgomery School in Kent.

=== Notice to improve ===
The current circumstances under which a school may be placed in special measures, and the procedures to follow, are stipulated by the Education Act 2005. Prior to 2005, special measures were applied to any school which was failing to supply an acceptable level of education; potential for improvement under current leadership was not taken into account. Under the new rules, schools demonstrating such potential are instead given a notice to improve and reinspected after a year.

=== Actions ===
Once an institution has been placed in special measures, they are presented with an action plan by the Local Authority detailing the key areas they need to develop in order to leave the category. Monitoring of this action plan then passes to HMI (His Majesty’s Inspectors) who visit the school typically once a term for 1–2 days to evaluate progress. Once HMI are satisfied that the action plan has been completed and all points satisfactorily addressed, then they will refer the school back to Ofsted and ask them to schedule a second Section 5 Inspection. If Ofsted agree with HMI’s judgement, the school is then removed from the special measures category. During a monitoring inspection an HMI can change the nature of the Inspection to a Section 5, and remove the school from Special Measures upon completion.

Support for schools that enter special measures comes in a variety of forms, and varies from local authority to local authority. Typically, though, schools will benefit from significant extra resources – both in terms of extra funds and consultancy from the local authority and external providers.

== In health and social care (England and Wales) ==
Monitor is responsible for putting NHS foundation trusts into special measures, while the NHS Trust Development Authority is responsible for other NHS trusts. This action is normally triggered by a Care Quality Commission inspection. An improvement director will be externally appointed and the failing Trust partnered with another high-performing Trust. An action plan is produced which is published on the NHS Choices website. Monitor may suspend some or all of the freedoms a Foundation trust has to operate as an autonomous body. Changes of the leadership of the organisation may be made. In March 2021 it was announced that the special measures process would be replaced by a new oversight framework where providers, commissioners, and health systems will be allocated into one of four ‘segments’ that determine the level of scrutiny and intervention they get. Under the new recovery support programme the equivalent of special measures is called intensive mandated support.

=== Perceived effectiveness ===
According to the research group Dr Foster Intelligence, the decision to put 11 trusts into special measures in July 2013 is likely to have saved hundreds of lives.

== Arts Council England ==
Arts Council England put English National Opera and Colchester’s Firstsite gallery into special measures in 2015 because of concerns over governance and the company’s proposed business model. Firstsite subsequently was named Art Fund Museum of the Year 2021.

== In the water industry ==
On 11 July 2024, water regulator Ofwat put Thames Water into special measures, with a "turnaround oversight regime" subject to "heightened regulatory" scrutiny. The company had over £15.2bn of debt. Ofwat said: "Thames Water faces significant issues, and as it seeks to tackle them, our draft determinations will support a major investment programme but also subject the company to new, heightened regulatory measures." Through to 2029, Thames Water is required to reduce sewage spills by 64%, cut leaks by 19% and reduce supply interruptions by two-thirds.

== In the legal system (Scotland) ==
In Scotland the term 'special measures' is defined by the Victims and Witnesses (Scotland) Act 2014 to describe systems put in place by the judicial system to protect vulnerable witnesses in courts of law. This can include measures taken to protect the identity of witnesses perceived as under threat of intimidation, or witnesses in cases involving alleged sex crimes or crimes against children where the experience of the legal system itself could prove intimidating.
