= Every Child Matters =

UK government initiative

Every Child Matters (ECM) is a UK government initiative for England and Wales, that was launched in 2003, at least partly in response to the death of Victoria Climbié. It is one of the most important policy initiatives which has been introduced in relation to children and children's services of the last decade, and has been described as a "sea change" to the children and families agenda. It has been the title of three government papers, leading to the Children Act 2004. Every Child Matters covers children and young adults up to the age of 19, or 90 for those with disabilities.

The initiative was centred around five outcomes, developed in consultation with families and young people:

- stay safe
- be healthy
- enjoy and achieve
- make a positive contribution
- achieve economic well-being

These outcomes are summarised in the acronym SHEEP: Safe, Healthy, Enjoy/Achieve, Economic, Positive contribution.

Each of these themes has a detailed framework attached which is required for multi-agency partnerships to work together in order to achieve. The agencies in partnership may include children's centres, early years, schools, children's social work services, primary and secondary health services, playwork, and Child and Adolescent Mental Health services (CAMHS). In the past it has been argued that children and families have received poorer services because of the failure of professionals to understand each other's roles or to work together effectively in a multi-disciplinary manner. ECM seeks to change this, stressing that it is important that all professionals working with children are aware of the contribution that could be made by their own and each other's service and to plan and deliver their work with children and young people accordingly.

It is the central goal of Every Child Matters to ensure every pupil is given the chance to be able to work towards the goals referenced within it. Most of the legislation passed and guidance applies to England and Wales, and all maintained schools have implemented the policy; it has also been influential in the rest of the UK and in some independent schools. The similar model Getting it Right for Every Child - GIRFEC is the equivalent approach in Scotland.

Since the formation of the Cameron Ministry in 2010 there has been some movement away from the terminology, and the funding for, Every Child Matters. Instead, the government is now returning child health checks to health visitors in their more traditional setting - the child's home - and subsidising a parent's independent choice of child care, via tax credits, rather than a centrally funded service.
