= University Hospital of South Manchester NHS Foundation Trust =

Coordinates: 53.3887°N 2.2919°W

The University Hospital of South Manchester NHS Foundation Trust is a defunct NHS foundation trust that previously operated Wythenshawe Hospital, a major acute teaching hospital in Wythenshawe, Manchester. Many of the services and facilities previously at Withington Hospital were transferred to Wythenshawe in 2004. It provided services for adults and children at Wythenshawe Hospital and Withington Community Hospital (the latter formerly owned by Manchester PCT). It runs Buccleuch Lodge Intermediate Care Unit and the Dermot Murphy Centre in Withington, and the Specialised Ability Centre in Sharston.

It merged with Central Manchester University Hospitals NHS Foundation Trust to form Manchester University NHS Foundation Trust on 1 October 2017.

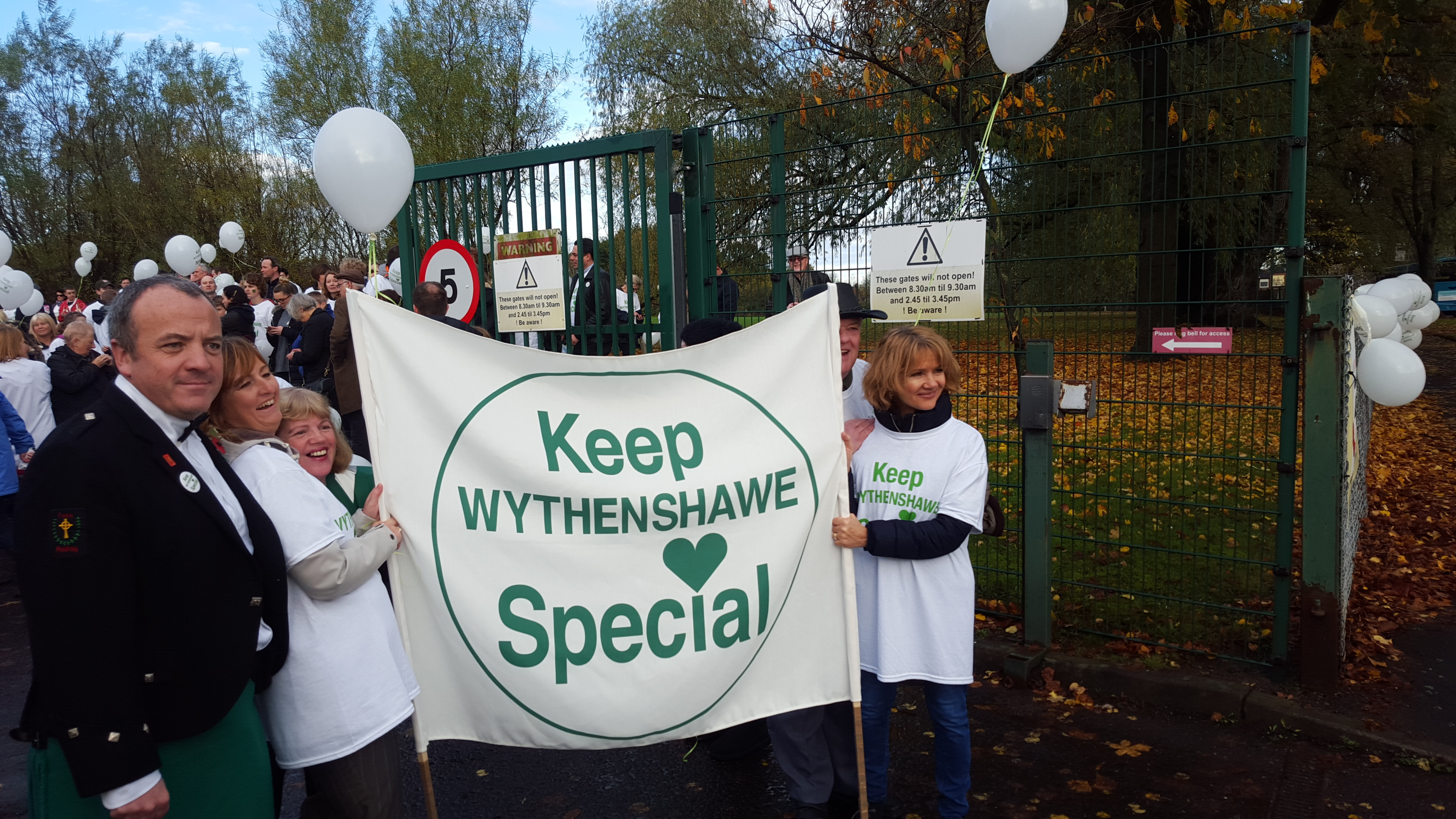
Keep Wythenshawe Special campaign

== History ==
Withington Urban District Council built a hospital with 100 beds, known as Baguley Sanatorium, for infectious disease on the site now occupied by Wythenshawe Hospital in 1902. It could no longer use Monsall Hospital as Manchester City Council required use of the whole hospital for their own fever patients. Withington had a policy of moving patients with infectious diseases to hospital and paying for their maintenance. The district council was incorporated into Manchester in 1904 and the sanatorium became one of the city hospitals. There were two two-storey buildings each with twelve beds, and two single-storey buildings each with a ten-bedded ward. In 1911 630 patients were admitted. In 1912 it was converted into a sanatorium for the treatment of tuberculosis with 150 beds. in 1916 two more blocks were built, increasing the capacity to 316 beds. Recreation rooms and a dining hall were built. The Hardman Street clinic became the corporation's tuberculosis dispensary. Another sanatorium, established by Chorlton on Medlock Board of Guardians in Abergele with 50 beds was also taken over by the corporation.

In 1922 817 patients were admitted and the daily average was 313. 66 patients had been there for more than a year. There were 193 deaths.

In 1935 84 more beds were established and a home for 91 nurses was built. San Toy, the Baguley Sanatorium magazine, was first published. It continued monthly until 1954 apart from the war years.

In 1939 an Emergency Hospital Service hospital was built on the Baguley site by Manchester Corporation. 17 pavilions were built, some of wood and some of brick, with a total capacity of 680 beds, reduced to 350 because of the specialist nature of some of the units. A plastic surgery and maxillo-facial surgery centre, with three thirty bedded wards, one for women, one for officers and one for other ranks, was established under the leadership of Professor F C Wilkinson. A dental laboratory was set up on a ward veranda. All the civilian TB patients were moved out. The first party of 10 patients came from Dunkirk on 3 June 1940 for maxillo-facial surgery. Patients included German prisoners of war. In 1943 a separate Dental unit and laboratory, a photography unit and two operating theatres were added. In early 1945 the hospital reverted to civilian use but with a military wing of 128 beds for servicemen with pulmonary TB. After the war it became difficult to find sufficient nurses and 120 beds were closed. The plastic surgery and maxillo-facial surgery centre continued and did some work at the Christie Hospital and at the Duchess of York Hospital. Randell Champion was appointed the first plastic surgery consultant in Manchester when the NHS started in 1948.

In 1947 469 patients were admitted to the sanatorium and 570 to the plastic surgery unit which also saw 1446 out-patients. There was then a recreation hall with a stage, dressing rooms, cinema projectors and 400 seats. It was also used for religious services, whist drives and other entertainments. There was an excellent bowling green a nursery with greenhouses and a vegetable garden. The secretary-steward, Robert Lawton Hall ran a piggery on the site which supplied pork to the Manchester municipal hospitals and used the hospital slops as food. In 1948 the sanatorium was taken over by the South Manchester Hospital Management Committee when the NHS started. Nine of the seventeen ward blocks were then empty. In 1950 one ward was renovated for use as a children's ward for the removal of tonsils and adenoids.

Wythenshawe hospital was officially established on 1 February 1952 using the buildings of the Emergency Hospital Service hospital. It was managed by the Wythenshawe and North Cheshire Hospital Management Committee A women's surgical department and two geriatric wards were opened. Baguley continued to deal with TB, but changed its name from sanatorium to hospital. It had about 400 beds. Bed rest and fresh air were still the main treatment but chemotherapy was being tried. Visiting was only allowed on Saturday and Sunday afternoons for an hour and half an hour on Wednesday evenings. 100 beds were still closed because of a shortage of nurses. In 1957 when Streptomycin and Para-Aminosalicylic acid were used for prolonged chemotherapy surgery was no longer needed for TB. The 14-month waiting list disappeared.

In 1959 the hospital radio, Radio Baguley, started. It ran twice-weekly record request programmes.

Building a new hospital was proposed by the regional hospital board in 1958, but Manchester Corporation refused to sell the land required unless it would comply with their clean air policy. The Board proposed coal-fired heating. In 1961 it was included among 29 major schemes in Enoch Powell's Hospital Plan. The first phase, the new maternity block, opened in October 1965. There were 60 lying-in and 20 ante-natal beds, 10 special care cots and 20 post-natal beds and an ante-natal clinic.

The plastic surgery and maxillo-facial surgery centre and three wards were transferred to Withington Hospital in 1969. Eventually, the new hospital was officially opened in 1973. At that point, the new hospital had 352 beds, but there were around 650 beds in the older buildings. The cardio-thoracic department had developed into a sub-regional specialist service, with three operating theatres, a 12-bed intensive care unit with a bedside computer system and a lung function investigation unit. From 1974 the hospital was run by the South Manchester Health Authority, which also ran Withington Hospital and Christie Hospital. In 1989/90 the authority had a budget of £111.5 million.

In 1987 the hospital was designated as the fourth heart transplant centre after £6 million in charitable donations had been raised.

In 1994 South Manchester University Hospitals NHS Trust took over the responsibility for the two general hospitals. In that year the Emergency Hospital Service huts were finally demolished. In 1995 the trust had an annual income of £150 million and 5,500 staff. There were 75,000 inpatients and day cases, 300,000 outpatient attendances and 90,000 attendances at the Accident and Emergency Department.

Between 1995 and 2002 the trust established two catheterisation laboratories, a large cystic fibrosis unit, transferred from Monsall Hospital and a bigger maternity unit when Withington Hospital was closed. The new acute unit, with 319 beds, 6 operating theatres, 17 intensive care beds, a fracture clinic and a renal unit was built under the Private Finance Initiative and opened in 2002. A 77-bed Mental Health unit was also built on the site for the Manchester Mental Health and Social Care Trust.

== Description ==
Its fields of specialism include cardiac services based in the new North West Heart Centre.
The hospital has occupied a leading position in UK interventional cardiology, cardiac imaging, cardiac electrophysiology and cardiothoracic surgery for over four decades. One of only six UK heart and lung transplantation centres, it is now developing a rapidly evolving Ventricular Assist Device programme. Further nationally recognised departments include respiratory medicine, burns and plastics, as well as cancer and breast care services. The hospital is also recognised in the region and nationally for the quality of its teaching, research and development. Major research programmes focus on cancer, lung disease, wound management and medical education.

It runs a specialist service for patients with cystic fibrosis across the North West, a regional Long Term Ventilation Unit and the National Aspergillosis Centre.

It had approximately 5,500 staff, including those employed by its private finance initiative partner South Manchester Healthcare Limited. It was the first hospital in the NHS to go from 0 ratings to 3 stars, after the introduction of a new system rating hospitals. UHSM is top in the North West when it comes to patient satisfaction, and 6th best in the country. In October 2010 it got the best ratings in Greater Manchester in a survey conducted by the Manchester Evening News.

== Relationship with private sector ==
The Trust uses BMI Healthcare's Alexandra Hospital in Cheadle, Greater Manchester to help with elective surgery capacity problems, usually in the winter. This often involves the same surgeon working on a Sunday. It also uses spare capacity in their Cath lab.

== Performance ==
2008 assessment

According to the Healthcare Commission assessment in 2008, it was one of a few trusts in the North West to achieve 'excellent' ratings for both parts of the study, both use of resources and quality of services. It also scored as follows in other parts of the report:

• 12/13 for safety and cleanliness
• 10/13 for waiting to be seen
• 5/5 for keeping the public healthy
• 9/9 for standard of care
• 9/10 for dignity and respect
• 17/17 for good management

It was named by the Health Service Journal as one of the top hundred NHS trusts to work for in 2015. At that time it had 5318 full-time equivalent staff and a sickness absence rate of 4.39%. 79% of staff recommend it as a place for treatment and 71% recommended it as a place to work.

== Electronic health record ==
The trust is implementing an Electronic health record which is intended to be implemented from January 2017. The contract has been awarded to Allscripts. The will require the building of a new datacentre. The trust will continue to use the Greater Manchester picture archiving and communications system. The trust's Chief Information Officer Mark Hutchinson has successfully implemented an electronic patient record using Allscripts at Salford Royal NHS Foundation Trust.

== Future plans ==
Following a prolonged consultation process called "Healthier Together" it was agreed by the Greater Manchester Clinical Commissioning Groups in July 2015 that Stepping Hill Hospital, Manchester Royal Infirmary, Salford Royal Hospital and Royal Oldham Hospital would be the "specialists" in emergency and high risk general surgery. This decision was challenged by consultants at the trust who launched a campaign under the banner "Keep Wythenshawe Special" and an action for judicial review, claiming the decision was unlawfully based on the impact on travel times for patients outside Greater Manchester. A march and rally in support of the campaign in November 2015 was addressed by Ted Robbins whose heart surgery was performed at the hospital. Dr Attila Vegh, the Chief Executive, resigned shortly before the announcement that the judicial review decision had been unsuccessful.

It is planned that the hospital will eventually be served by its own dedicated Manchester Metrolink stop (Wythenshawe Hospital Metrolink station).

Plans were announced in 2016 for a merger between the trust and the Central Manchester University Hospitals NHS Foundation Trust as proposed in a report by Sir Jonathan Michael. The merged trust would then take over North Manchester General Hospital, at present run by Pennine Acute Hospitals NHS Trust.

== See also ==
- Manchester Medical School
- Manchester Academic Health Science Centre
- Healthcare in Greater Manchester
- List of hospitals in England
- List of NHS trusts
