= Central Manchester University Hospitals NHS Foundation Trust =

Health care trust in Manchester, England

Coordinates: 53.46115°N 2.2279°W

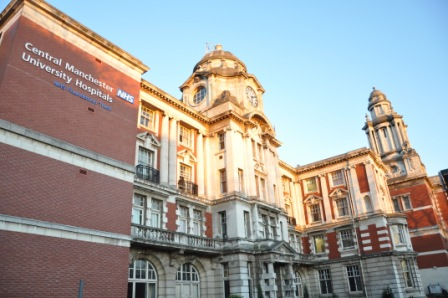
The Trust's headquarters on Oxford Road, Manchester

Central Manchester University Hospital NHS Foundation Trust, was a large NHS foundation trust in Manchester, England, that was founded in 2009 and merged with University Hospital of South Manchester NHS Foundation Trust in 2017 to form the current Manchester University NHS Foundation Trust.

The trust ran eight hospitals in Manchester and Trafford: Manchester Royal Infirmary, Royal Manchester Children's Hospital, Saint Mary's Hospital, Manchester, Manchester Royal Eye Hospital and University Dental Hospital of Manchester in Manchester, and Trafford General Hospital, Altrincham Hospital and Stretford Memorial Hospital in Trafford.

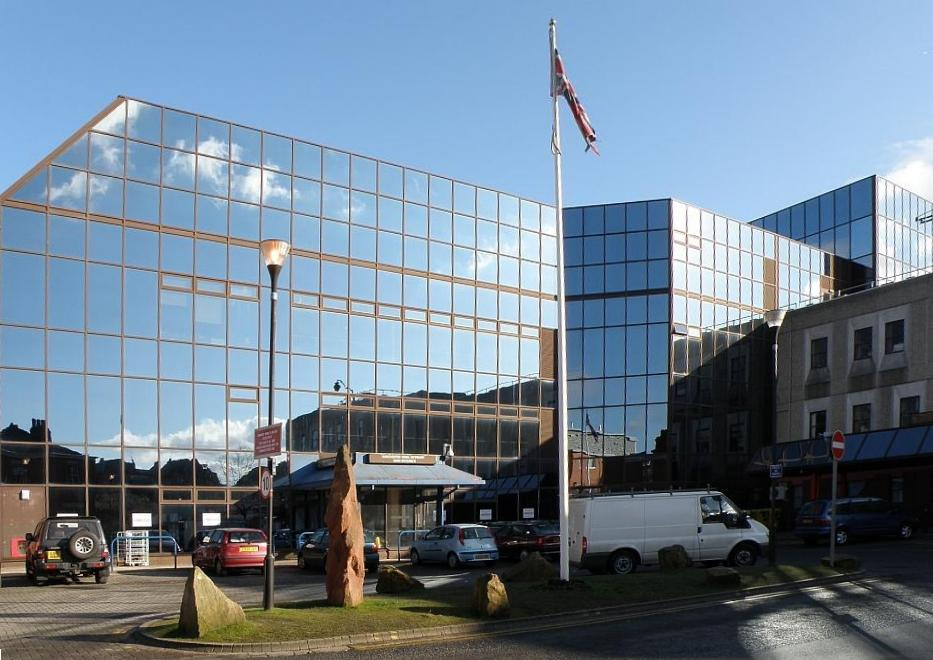
The main entrance to the Manchester Royal Infirmary

== History ==
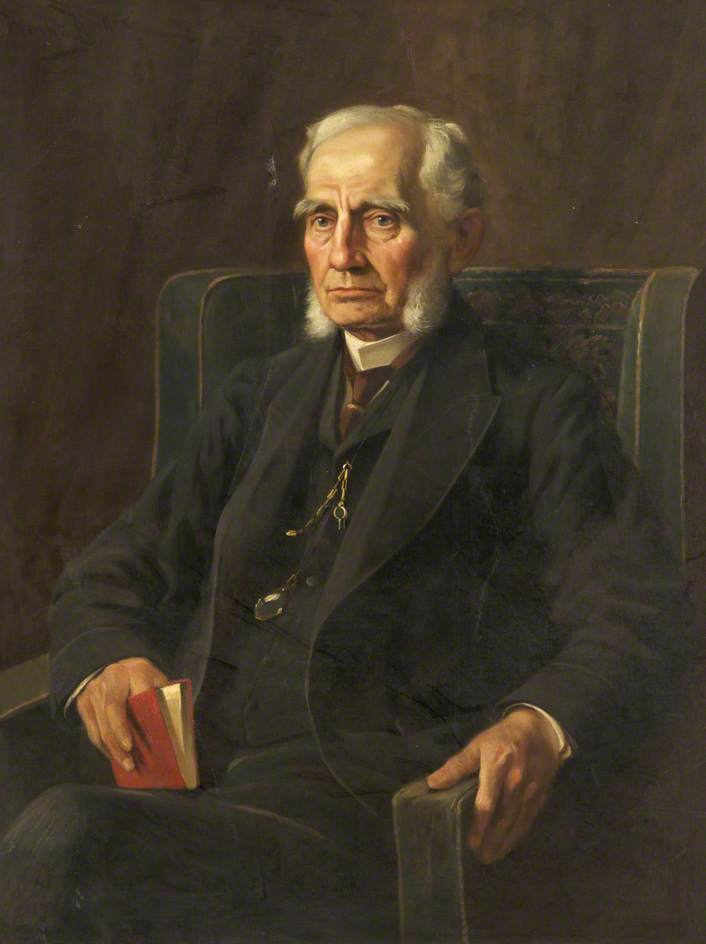
Dr Frank Renaud by Wright Barker (1903)

Dr Frank Renaud was employed at Manchester Royal Infirmary as honorary physician (1848–1866) and consulting physician (1866–1902). The Infirmary, Manchester Convalescent Home, St Mary's, the Royal Eye Hospital, the Dental Hospital and the Foot Hospital in Manchester were entitled The United Manchester Hospitals when they were taken into the National Health Service in 1948 and run by one hospital management committee. Sir Mike Deegan was Chief Executive from 2001.

Central Manchester University Hospitals NHS Foundation Trust merged with University Hospital of South Manchester NHS Foundation Trust to form Manchester University NHS Foundation Trust on 1 October 2017 as proposed in a report by Sir Jonathan Michael.

== Sites ==
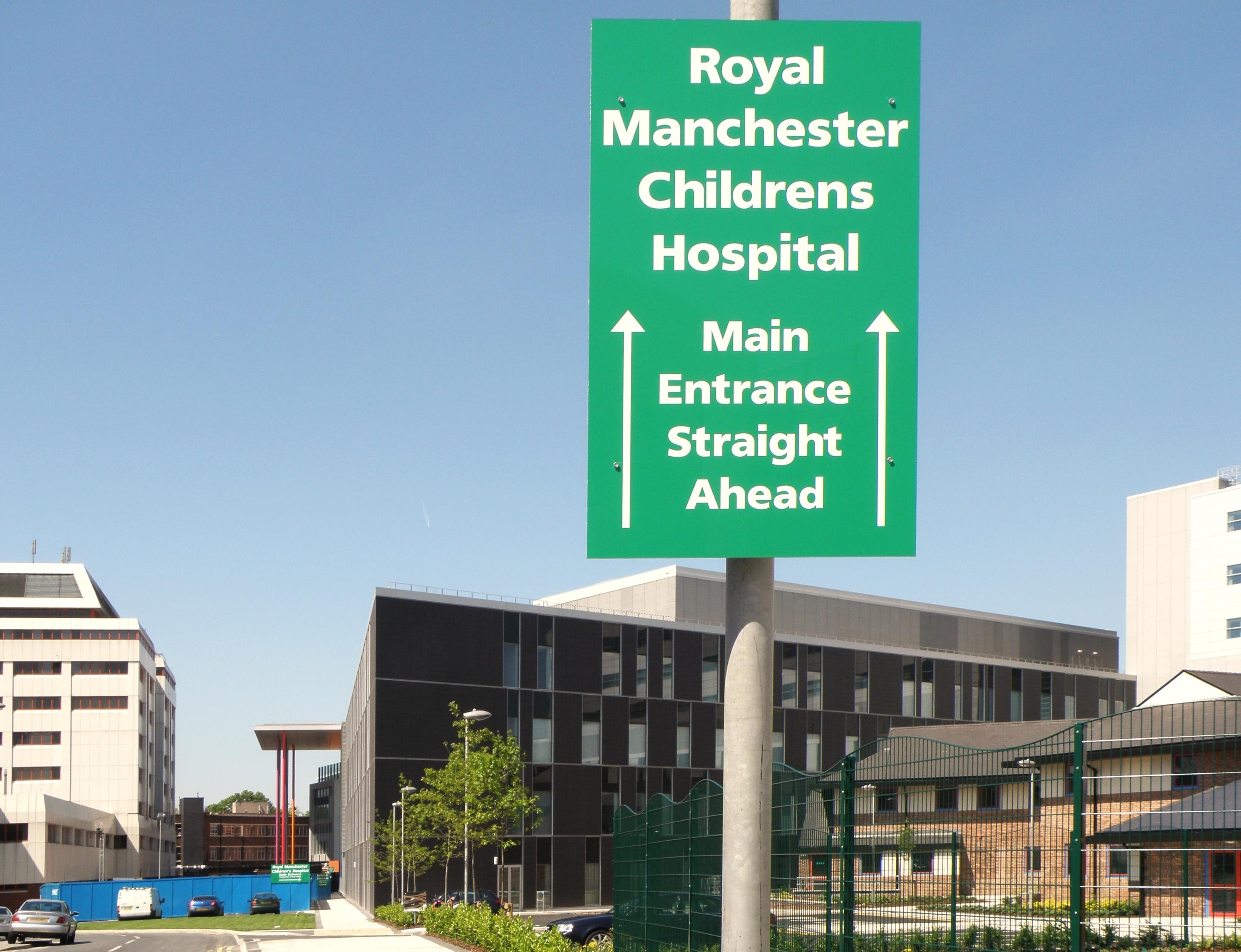
The shared site on Oxford Road

The main hospitals share a large site between Oxford Road and Upper Brook Street in Manchester, close to the Manchester Medical School (part of the University of Manchester). The Dental Hospital is on a separate site on a peppercorn rent from the University of Manchester. The three Trafford hospitals run by Trafford Healthcare Trust were taken over by CMFT in 2012.

The Trust commissioned one of the biggest Private Finance Initiative schemes in the NHS, designed by Anglo-American architects Anshen Dyer and built by Lendlease. On the same site since summer 2009 are the new Children's Hospital, St Mary's Hospital (Maternity and Babies), the new wing of Manchester Royal Infirmary, and the new Eye Hospital It is possible to access one hospital from the others without going outside. A link bridge links the old St Mary's Hospital building with its own new wing, the Eye Hospital, the Children's Hospital and the new wing of the Royal Infirmary.

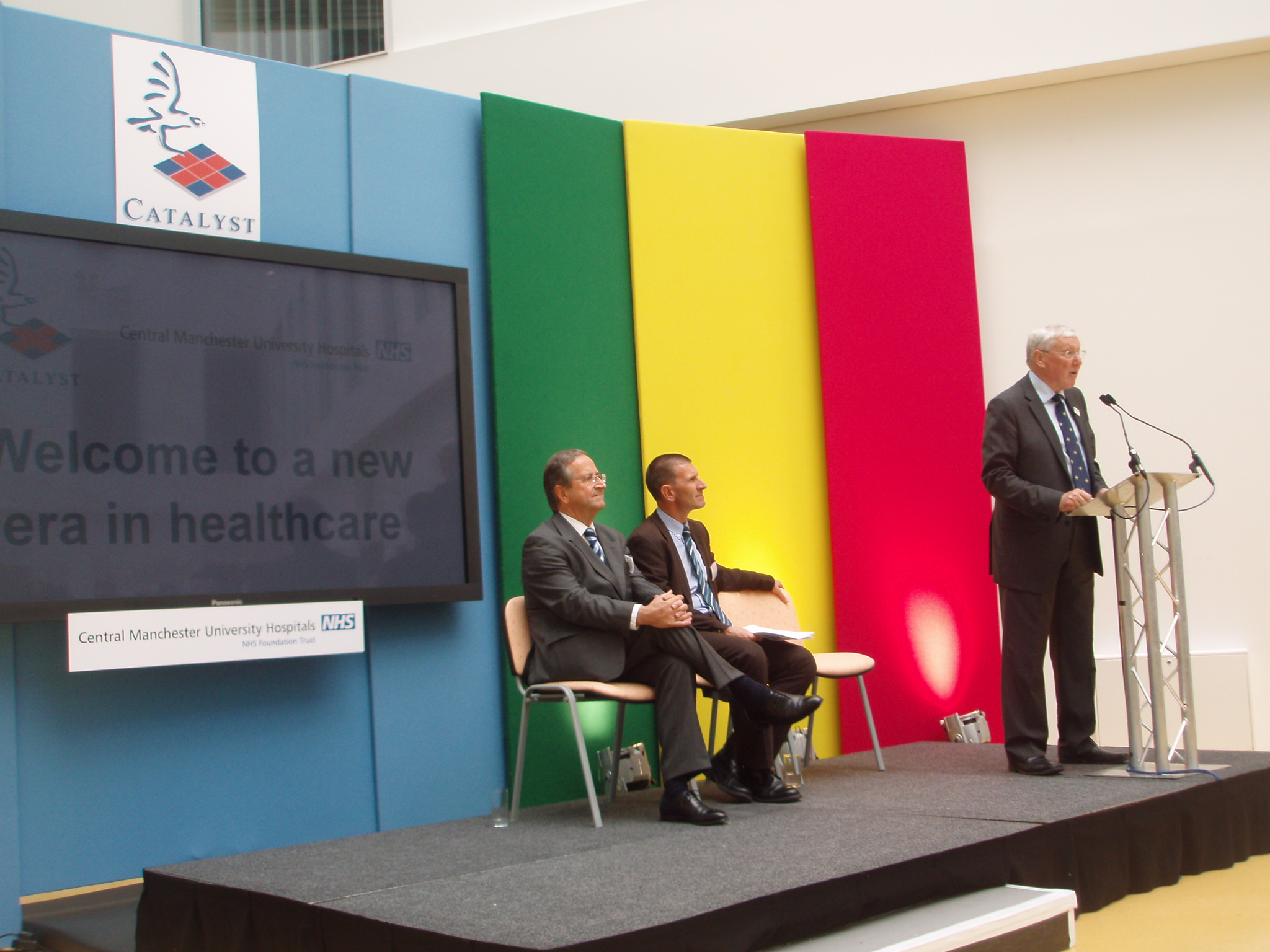
Speakers on the platform

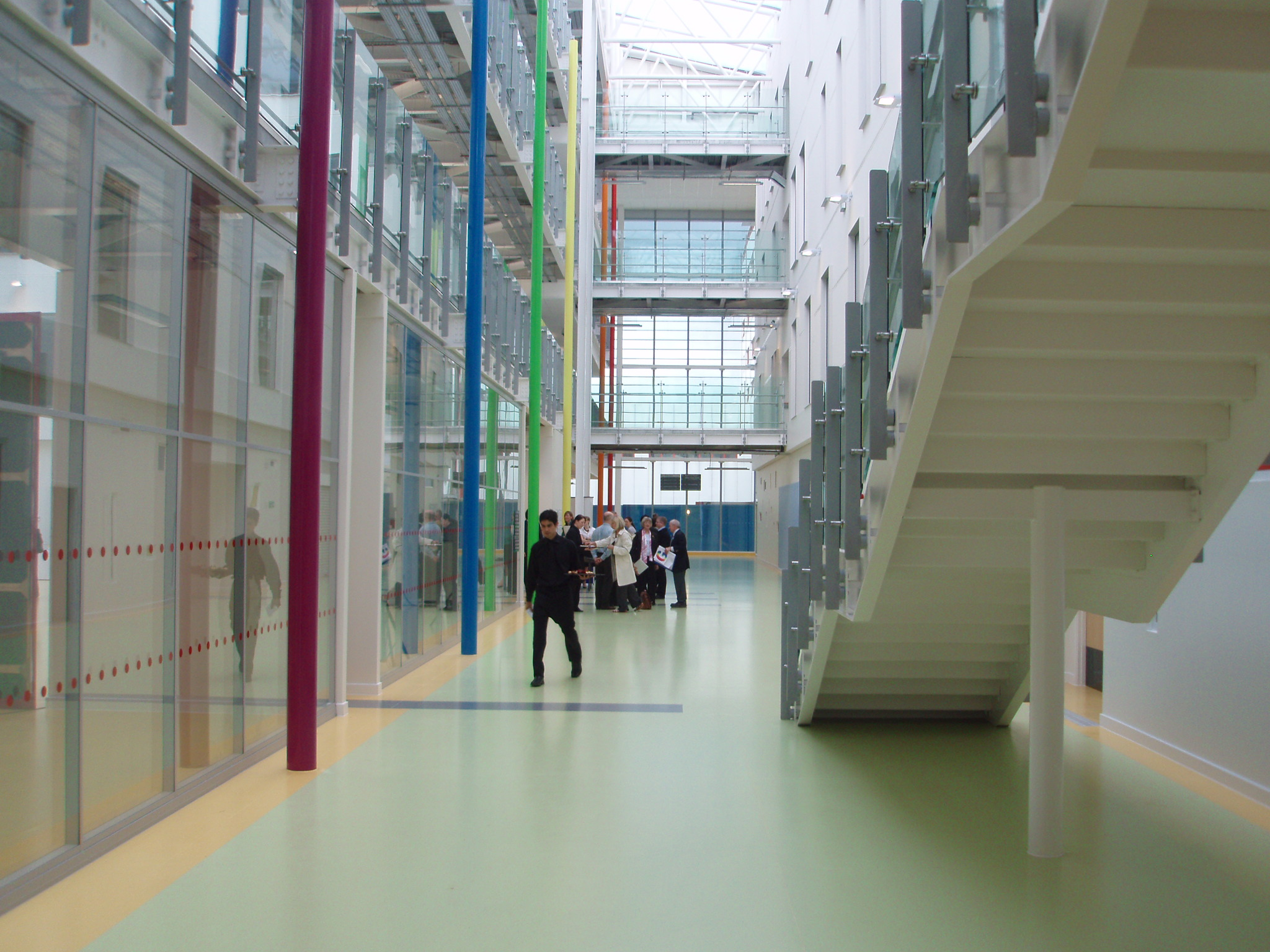
View from the main entrance

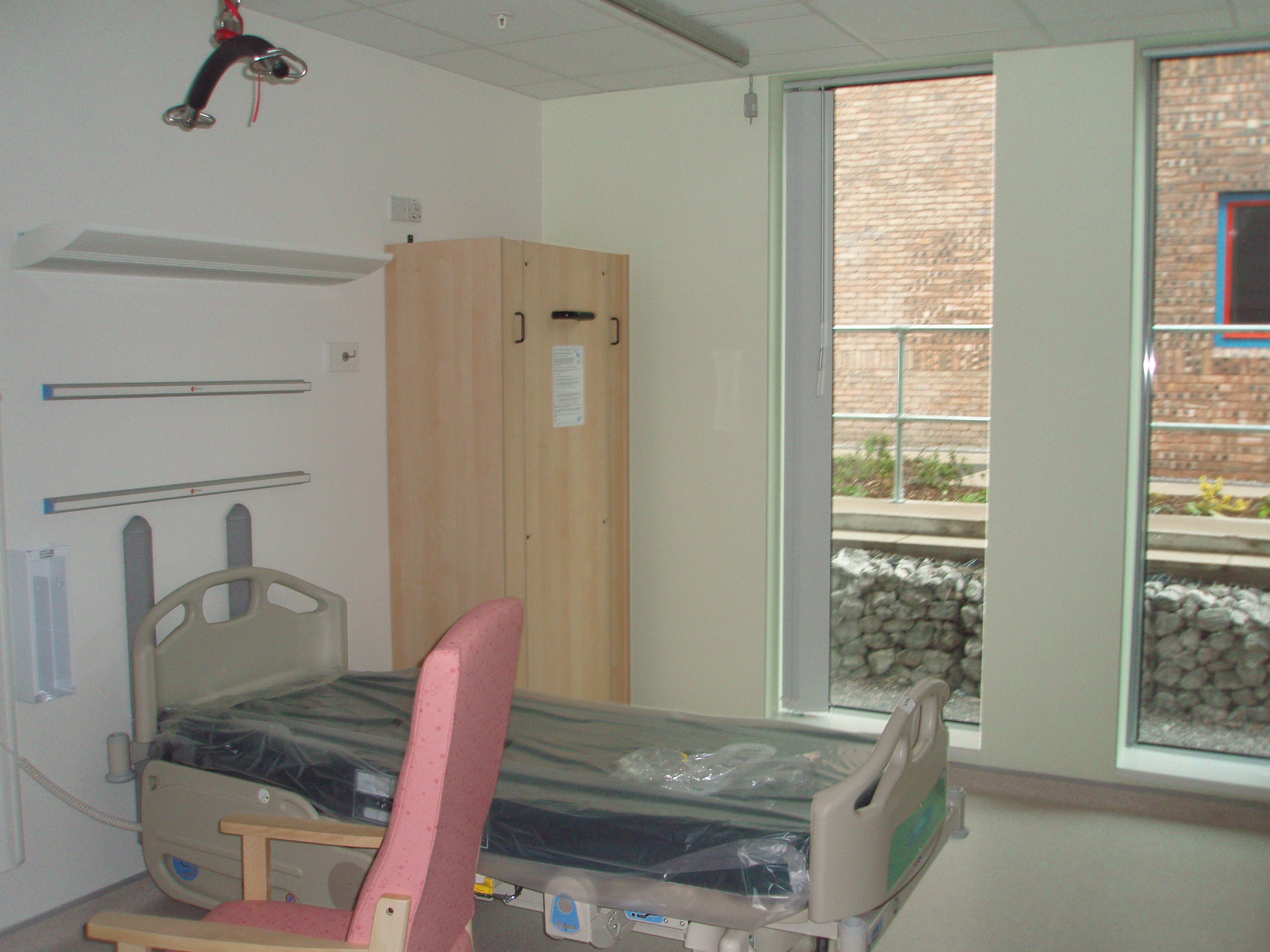
New single bed room

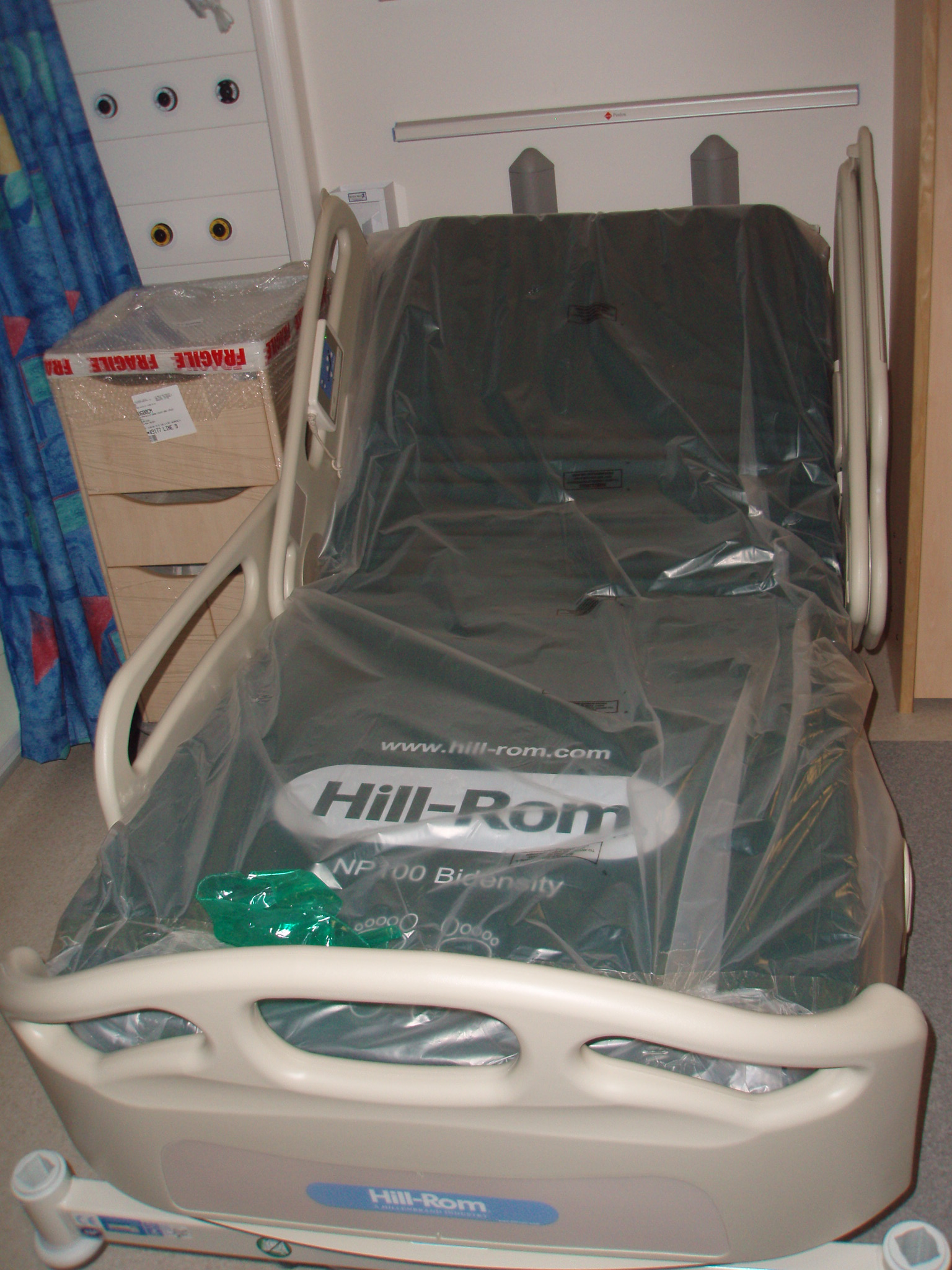
High dependency bed still wrapped up

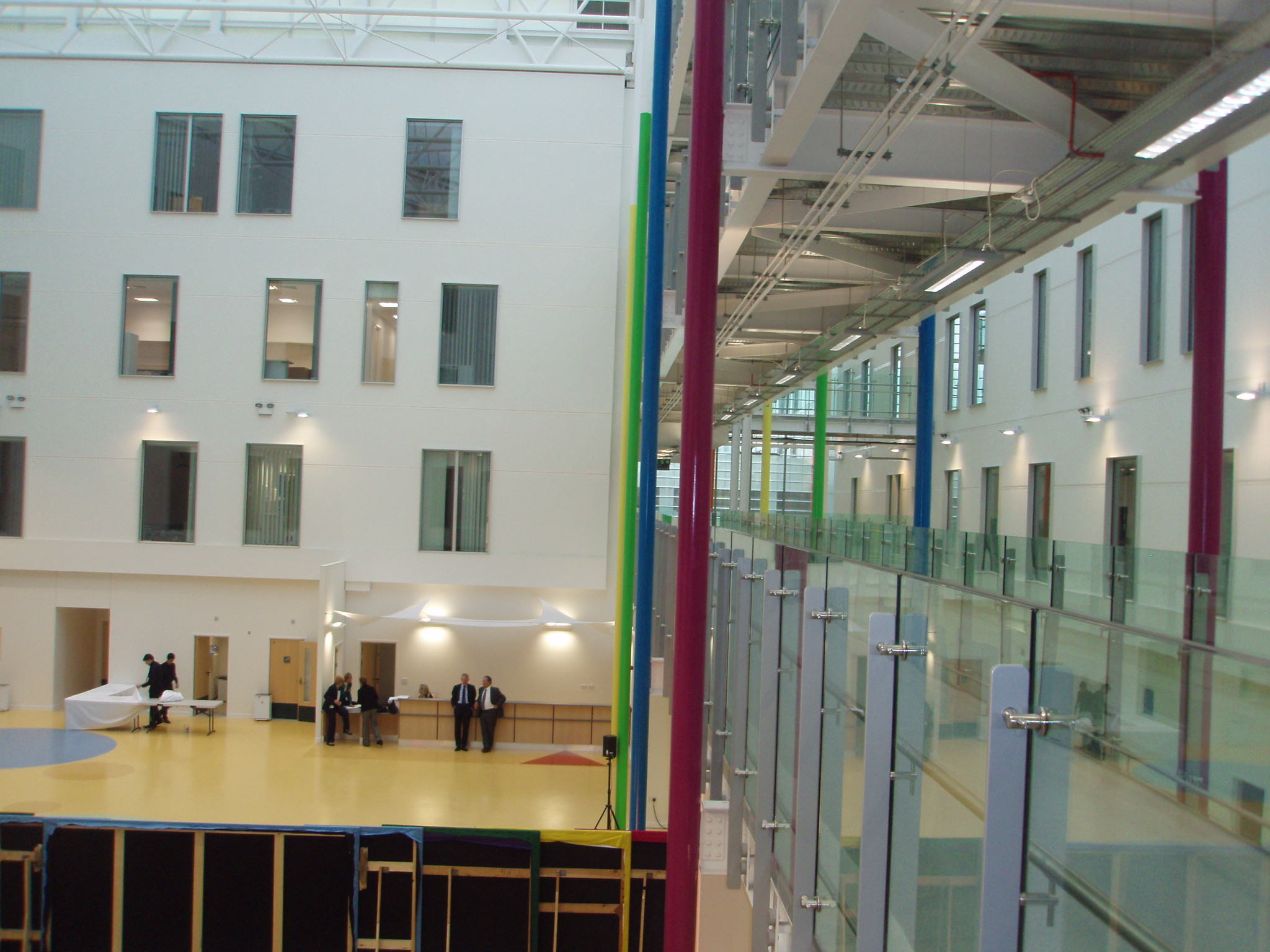
View from the top floor

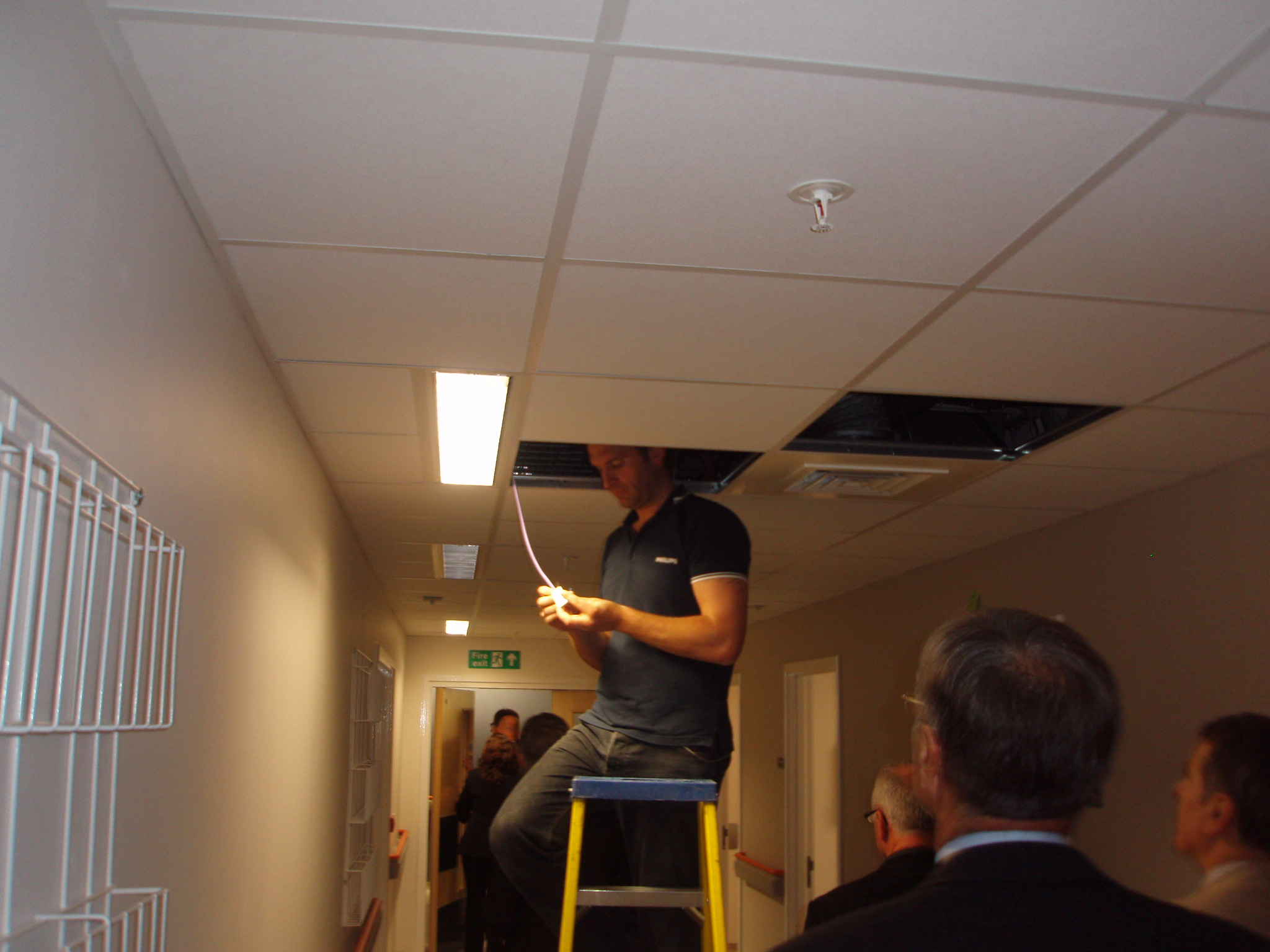
Electrician with head in the ceiling

The Children's Hospital contains 371 beds and is the largest free-standing children's hospital in the UK.

The trust has one of the 11 Genomics Medicines Centres associated with Genomics England which will open across England in February 2014. All the data produced in the 100,000 Genomes project will be made available to drugs companies and researchers to help them create precision drugs for future generations.

== Services ==
The Manchester Diabetic Centre was established in 1988 by Professor Stephen Tomlinson and Jill Pooley, one of the first diabetes specialist nurses in the country. It was deliberately sited outside the main hospital building on Hathersage Road at the southern end of the Oxford Road site. It included other paramedics such as chiropodists and dieticians so it could deliver a one-stop shop for diabetic care. Tomlinson argued that the new way of providing care would prevent secondary conditions such as diabetic foot.

The Manchester Sickle Cell Centre was established in 1984 – also off the main site, on the opposite side of Oxford Road from the main building. It was renamed as the Sickle-Cell and Thalassaemia Centre in 1991.

As the leading provider of tertiary and specialist healthcare services in Manchester, It treated more than a million patients every year. On 1 April 2011, community services previously provided by the primary care trust transferred to the trust as part of the Transforming Community Services initiative.

It is one of the biggest provider of specialised services in England, which generated an income of £334.7 million in 2014/5. The transplant team carried out 317 transplants in 2015, the most of any centre in the UK.

== Relationship with private sector ==
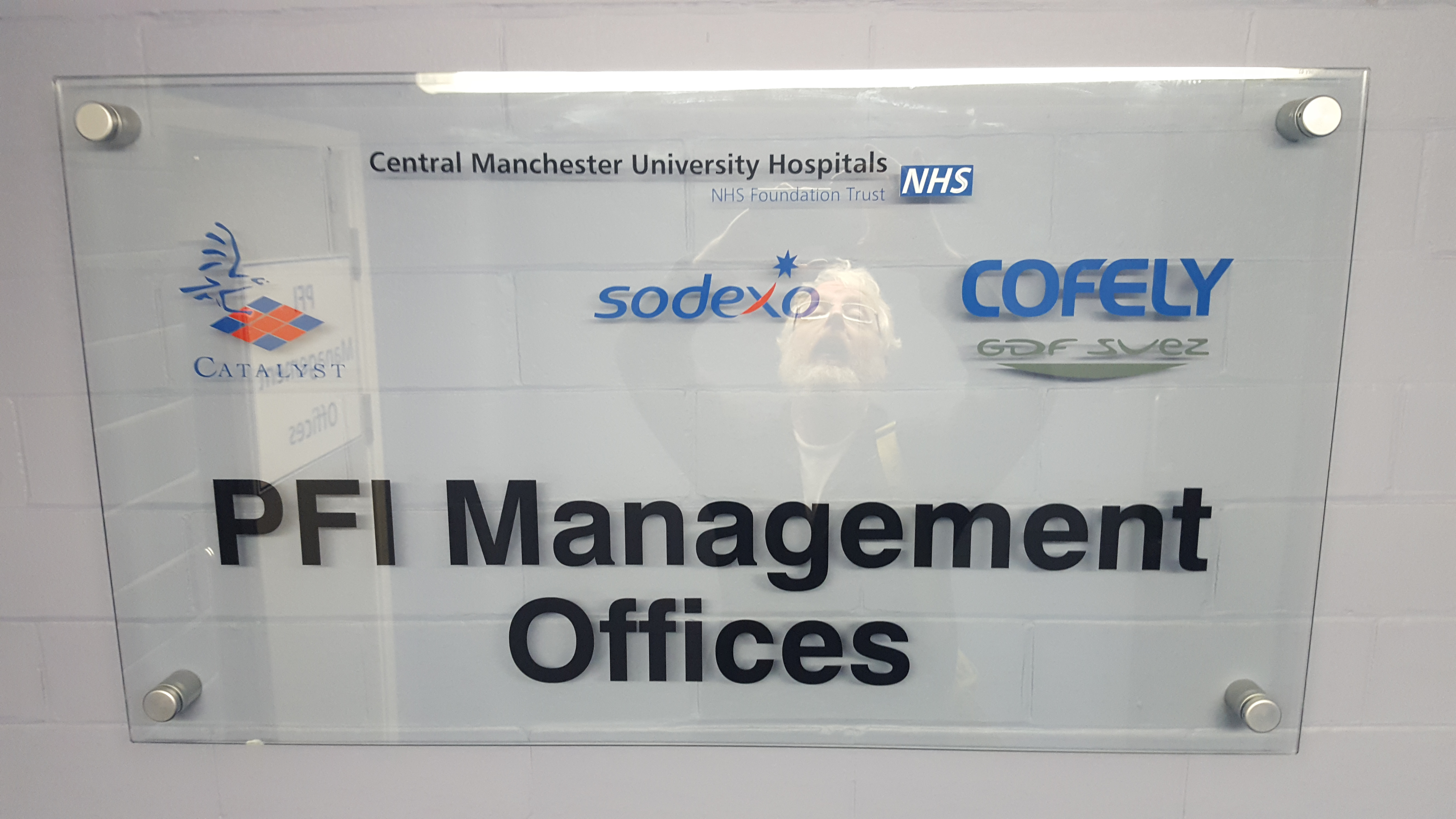
Sign on the door Central Manchester University Hospitals NHS Foundation Trust

The Trust constructed one of the biggest Private Finance Initiative schemes in the NHS, designed by Anglo-American architects Anshen Dyer and developed by Lendlease. Non-clinical services are run by Sodexo (formerly Sodexho) whose contract runs until 2042. The Private finance initiative contract costs about £72 million per annum. This covers domestic services, maintenance and estates, patient catering, portering, linen and laundry, waste management and security, and includes almost all the Trust facilities, not only those built under the contract.

The Trust used BMI Healthcare's Alexandra Hospital in Cheadle, Greater Manchester to help with elective surgery capacity problems, usually in the winter. This often involves the same surgeon working on a Sunday. It also uses spare capacity in their Cath lab.

In March 2016 the trust entered into a contract with Bruntwood to provide planning and construction advice and design services for its estate.

== Performance ==
Problems associated with doctors' illegible handwriting were highlighted in a Care Quality Commission report in May 2014, which also criticised the food as not being healthy enough and lacking variety. The Trust are hoping to move to an Electronic patient record system.

It was named by the Health Service Journal as one of the top hundred NHS trusts to work for in 2015. At that time it had 11,534 full-time equivalent staff and a sickness absence rate of 5.07%. 67% of staff recommend it as a place for treatment and 62% recommended it as a place to work.

The trust recruited 275 nurses in India in the summer of 2015 to help fill 550 vacancies but says that "difficulties in the pre-employment and migration processes required to bring the nurses into the UK" have prevented most of them from arriving because the certificates of sponsorship expired before the required checks could be completed.

Attendance at the Emergency department has increased steadily, and more than at other hospitals 311,134 people attended in 2015/6, 3.8% more than the previous year.

A programme at the Infirmary that provides kidney dialysis patients with training and equipment so they can perform their own treatment at home has saved £1m for 70 patients and may be rolled out nationally.

== Finance ==
The trust expected to finish 2015–16 with a deficit of more than £23 million as a result of changes to the NHS tariff. In that year it had an income of £967 million. £553 million was spent on staff salaries and pensions, £233 million on clinical supplies and services, £100 million on other running costs and £110 million on buildings and facilities, including the PFI scheme. In 2016-17 it made a surplus of £56 million - one of very few NHS trusts to end up in the black.

== See also ==
- Healthcare in Greater Manchester
- List of NHS trusts
