= Mark Cubbon =

Mark Cubbon may refer to:

- Mark Cubbon (army officer), British army officer with the East India Company
- Mark Cubbon (administrator), chief executive of the Manchester University NHS Foundation Trust

== See also ==
- Mark Cuban, American investor and entrepreneur
