= Manchester Mental Health and Social Care Trust =

Mental health trust in Manchester

- Type: NHS hospital trust
- Website: www.mhsc.nhs.uk

Manchester Mental Health and Social Care Trust was a mental health trust in Manchester, England, between 2002 and 2016.

The trust was formed in April 2002 as one of the first mental health and social care NHS organisations in England. It ran wards at North Manchester General Hospital and Wythenshawe Hospital.

The Edale Unit at Hathersage Road, Manchester, was closed in 2011 after being in use for about five years.

The trust spent £1.7m in the first four months of 2013–14 on beds for 86 patients at other providers.

In 2014, quarter of staff at the trust said they would not recommend it to their friends or family, according to the first NHS Friends and Family Test; and more than a third of staff who took part in the survey also said they would not recommend it as a good place to work.

In December 2014 the trust won a contract to lead the running of health services at both Strangeways prison and HM Prison Buckley Hall in Rochdale. They were to work with drug and alcohol abuse charity Lifeline project.

The trust spent £4,615,299 on private mental health placements in 2013/4.

In October 2015, after making cuts in support services and community therapy to the value of £1.5 million, the trust declared that it was no longer viable as an independent organisation. It was dissolved in 2016 and services were taken over by Greater Manchester West Mental Health NHS Foundation Trust.

== See also ==
- Healthcare in Greater Manchester
- List of NHS trusts
