= Altrincham General Hospital =

British hospital

- Central Manchester University Hospitals NHS Foundation Trust
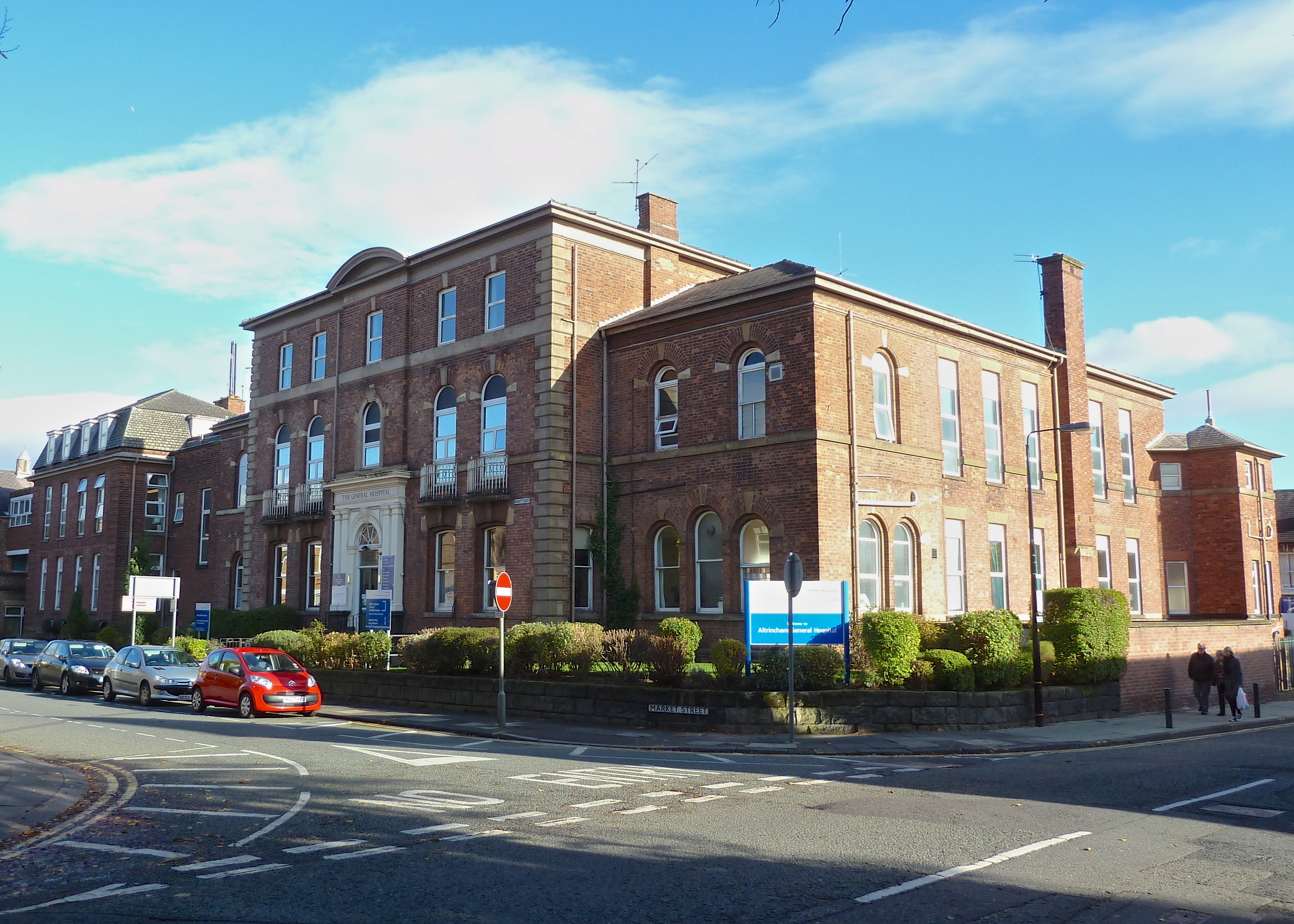
- Altrincham General Hospital

- Shown in Greater Manchester

Geography
- Location: Market Street, Altrincham, Greater Manchester, England, United Kingdom
- Coordinates: 53.3864°N 2.3531°W

Organisation
- Care system: Public NHS
- Type: General hospital

Services
- Emergency department: No Accident & Emergency

History
- Founded: 1853
- Closed: 2015

Links
- Lists: Hospitals in England

Altrincham General Hospital was a health facility in Market Street in Altrincham, Greater Manchester, England. It was managed by the Central Manchester University Hospitals NHS Foundation Trust.

== History ==
The facility has its origins in the Lloyds Fever Hospital established in Market Street in 1853. It was completely rebuilt and reopened as the Altrincham Provident Dispensary and Hospital in 1870 before joining the National Health Service in 1948. After services transferred to a modern community hospital on Railway Street, Altrincham General Hospital closed in April 2015. The site in Market Street was subsequently redeveloped to create a health and wellbeing centre as well as a new home for Altrincham Library.
