= Judith Elizabeth Adams =

British radiologist

- Born: 16 May 1945; Liverpool, England
- Died: 30 September 2017 (aged 72)
- Education: UCL Medical School
- Scientific career
- Fields: Musculoskeletal radiology

Judith Elizabeth Adams (16 May 1945 – 30 September 2017) was an English professor, musculoskeletal radiologist, honorary consultant, and clinical director of the radiology department at Manchester University NHS Foundation Trust.

== Career ==
Adams obtained a degree in medicine at University College London. She started working as a junior doctor at Addenbrookes Hospital during 1972. Her mentors included pioneers like Sir Godfrey Hounsfield and Sir Charles Dent. She obtained a Fellowship of The Royal College of Radiologists in 1975 and became a lecturer in 1976, senior lecturer in 1979, and a professor in 1993. She also served as the head of the academic department and head of training of the Manchester radiology training scheme, and an honorary consultant at the NHS until her death.

== Research ==
Adams' research primarily focused on osteoporosis-related fractures. She secured well over £5.5 million in research grants throughout her career. She co-authored 273 peer-reviewed scientific papers with 12365 citations recorded by Scopus, 24 invited reviews, and 34 book chapters. She has an h-index of 60.

== Selected publications ==
- Kelly, W.; Adams, J. E.; Laing, I.; Longson, D.; Davies, D. (February 1988). "Long-Term Treatment of Nelson's Syndrome with Sodium Valproate". Clinical Endocrinology. 28 (2): 195–204. doi:10.1111/j.1365-2265.1988.tb03656.x. ISSN 0300-0664. PMID 2844446. S2CID 34254932.
- Saunders, Fiona R; Gregory, Jennifer S; Pavlova, Anastasia V; Muthuri, Stella G; Hardy, Rebecca J; Martin, Kathryn R; Barr, Rebecca J; Adams, Judith E; Kuh, Diana; Aspden, Richard M; Cooper, Rachel (12 March 2020). "Motor development in infancy and spine shape in early old age: findings from a British birth cohort study". Journal of Orthopaedic Research. 38 (12): 2740–2748. doi:10.1002/jor.24656. ISSN 0736-0266. PMC 8641380. PMID 32162719.
- Ireland, Alex; Saunders, Fiona R; Muthuri, Stella G; Pavlova, Anastasia V; Hardy, Rebecca J; Martin, Kathryn R; Barr, Rebecca J; Adams, Judith E; Kuh, Diana; Aspden, Richard M; Gregory, Jennifer S (March 2019). "Age at Onset of Walking in Infancy Is Associated With Hip Shape in Early Old Age". Journal of Bone and Mineral Research. 34 (3): 455–463. doi:10.1002/jbmr.3627. ISSN 0884-0431. PMC 6446733. PMID 30496618.
- Muthuri, Stella G.; Pavlova, Anastasia V.; Saunders, Fiona R.; Hardy, Rebecca J.; Gregory, Jennifer S.; Barr, Rebecca J.; Martin, Kathryn R.; Adams, Judith E.; Kuh, Diana; Aspden, Richard M.; Cooper, Rachel (December 2018). "Associations between back pain across adulthood and spine shape in early old age in a British birth cohort". Scientific Reports. 8 (1): 16309. Bibcode:2018NatSR...816309M. doi:10.1038/s41598-018-34628-9. ISSN 2045-2322. PMC 6218503. PMID 30397263.

== Memberships ==
- Chairman of the ESSR osteoporosis committee.
- Member of the International Skeletal Society in 1986.
- Member of the European Society of Skeletal Radiologists since 1995.
- Examiner for The Royal College of Radiologists (part I and part II).
- Regional education adviser, member of the council and other boards, dean, and vice president.
- Chair of the regional committee for Clinical Excellence awards.

== Awards ==
- 2007: Gold Medal from the International Skeletal Society.
- 2015: Co-presenter at the annual BRS Dent Lecture in clinical imaging, shared with Professor Ignac Fogelman, by the Bone Research Society.
- 2016: Gold Medal of the Royal College of Radiologists.
- 2016: Linda Edwards Award of the National Osteoporosis Society.

== Personal life ==
Adams was born in 1945 in Liverpool, raised in Zambia, and died in 2017 while working as a professor in Manchester, UK. She enjoyed swimming, horse-riding, and played fencing. She married professor Peter Adams and raised two sons.
