= Stretford Memorial Hospital =

- Central Manchester University Hospitals NHS Foundation Trust
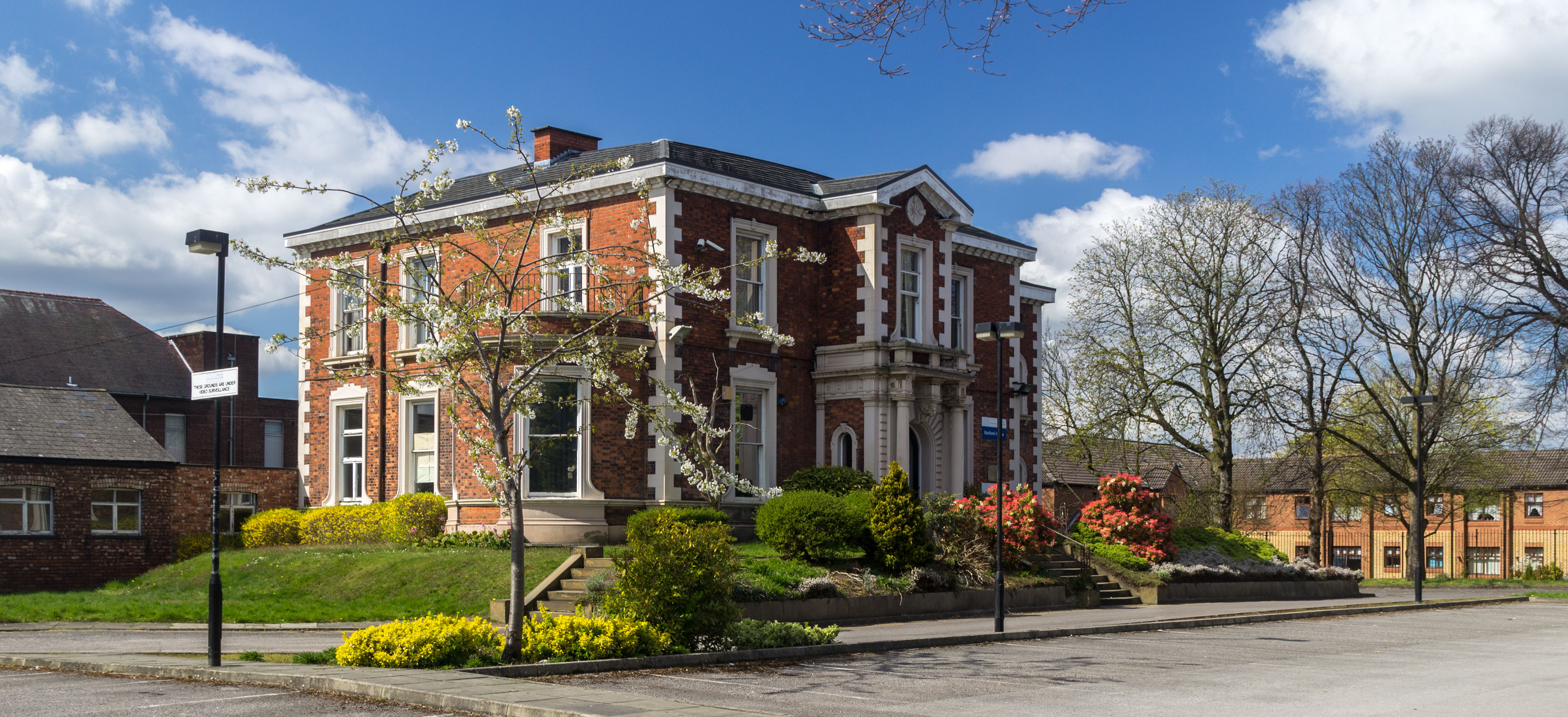
- Stretford Memorial Hospital

- Shown in Greater Manchester

Geography
- Location: Seymour Grove, Stretford, Greater Manchester, England, United Kingdom
- Coordinates: 53.4529°N 2.2742°W

Organisation
- Care system: Public NHS
- Type: Community hospital

Services
- Emergency department: No Accident & Emergency

History
- Founded: 1925
- Closed: 2015

Links
- Lists: Hospitals in England

Stretford Memorial Hospital was a health facility in Seymour Grove, Stretford, Greater Manchester. It was managed by Central Manchester University Hospitals NHS Foundation Trust. It closed in 2015.

== History ==
The building in which the hospital was housed was originally a private residence known as Basford House. It was designed in the Italianate style and completed around 1850. It was loaned to the British Red Cross for use as an auxiliary hospital during World War I. In 1925, a local trust acquired the building and converted into a maternity hospital, as a lasting memorial to soldiers who died in the war. The hospital joined the National Health Service in 1948. In 1956, Joy Division singer Ian Curtis was born at the Hospital and in 1958, Andy Gibb, the brother of the Bee Gees and a singer in his own right, was born. In October 1985, it was converted for use as a geriatric hospital, and later became the base for Trafford's Child and Adolescent Mental Health Service .

In 2015, the services transferred to Trafford General Hospital and Stretford Memorial Hospital closed. After its closure the site became a target for vandals and squatters. In May 2021, a developer submitted proposals for the restoration of the building to the Trust.
