= Delaunays =

Delaunays may refer to:

- Robert Delaunay (1885-1941) and Sonia Delaunay (1885-1979), French artists; husband and wife
- North Manchester General Hospital, formerly Delaunays workhouse, in Manchester, England
