= Monsall Hospital =

- Shown in Greater Manchester

Geography
- Location: Monsall, Manchester, England
- Coordinates: 53.503340°N 2.204318°W

Organisation
- Care system: NHS
- Type: Specialist

Services
- Speciality: Fever Hospital

History
- Founded: 1871
- Closed: 1993

Links
- Lists: Hospitals in England

Monsall Hospital was a hospital in North Manchester, England.

The facility joined the National Health Service in 1948 and became the Monsall Isolation Hospital in 1954 before being renamed Monsall Hospital in 1965. It closed in 1993.

== History ==
The facility was established as a fever hospital by the trustees of Manchester Royal Infirmary, largely because of the insistence of John Leigh, the first Medical Officer of Health for Manchester; it opened as the Barnes House of Recovery and Convalescent Home for Fever Patients in 1871. Robert Barnes donated £9,000 and the hospital was named the Barnes House of Recovery. Manchester City Council contributed £500. The total cost was £13,000. There was accommodation for 128 fever patients and room to separate patients with different infections. In 1875, there were 843 admissions, mostly for smallpox. By 1895, more buildings had been erected and there were 350 beds.

The hospital was sold to Manchester City Council in 1895 for £4,900. The council agreed to receive and treat any patients with infectious diseases, including Erysipelas, and for the first four years it was agreed that the medical staff of the infirmary could instruct students in the fever wards. It became the Monsall Fever Hospital in 1897 and the Monsall Hospital for Infectious Diseases in 1925.

The City of Manchester Pathology Service was established on the site in the 1930s, serving Withington Hospital, Booth Hall Children's Hospital, Prestwich Hospital and Baguley Hospital.

In September 1985, the first person with HIV/AIDS to be detained to hospital under the Public Health (Control of Disease) Act 1984, was detained at Monsall Hospital. This led to major protests and he was allowed to leave after 10 days in hospital.

== See also ==
- Barnes Hospital, Cheadle
