= Manchester University NHS Foundation Trust =

NHS Foundation

- Type: NHS foundation trust
- Established: 1 October 2017
- Headquarters: Oxford Road; Manchester; M13 9WL
- Budget: £2.2 billion
- Hospitals: Altrincham Hospital; Manchester Royal Eye Hospital; Manchester Royal Infirmary; North Manchester General Hospital; Royal Manchester Children's Hospital; Saint Mary's Hospital; Trafford General Hospital; University Dental Hospital of Manchester; Withington Community Hospital; Wythenshawe Hospital
- Staff: 28,479 (2021/22)
- Website: mft.nhs.uk

Manchester University NHS Foundation Trust is an NHS Acute Foundation Trust which operates 10 hospitals throughout Greater Manchester. It is the largest NHS trust in the United Kingdom, with an income of £2.2 billion and 28,479 staff in 2021–2022.

== History ==
It was formed by the merger of Central Manchester University Hospitals NHS Foundation Trust with the University Hospital of South Manchester NHS Foundation Trust on 1 October 2017. The trust took over North Manchester General Hospital, which it started running since 1 April 2020 under a management agreement with Pennine Acute Hospitals NHS Trust before taking complete control on 1 April 2021.

Prior to the formation of the new trust, the Competition and Markets Authority decided that while the merger would substantially reduce competition among health services in the area, the benefits to patients were 'more significant'.

The trust was formed to create the "Manchester Single Hospital Service", part of the Healthier Manchester programme to improve healthcare across the city. The aim of the Single Hospital Service mergers is to reduce health inequalities across the City of Manchester & Trafford by running the hospitals across the area together, instead of separately in the 3 previously existing hospital trusts.

Sir Mike Deegan remained the chief executive, as he was of the predecessor organisations, until 2022. Kathy Cowell is the chair of the organisation. In November 2022 Mark Cubbon, NHS England's chief delivery officer was appointed as chief executive.

== Hospitals ==
The trust runs ten hospitals across 7 sites, alongside community services, which are provided through its membership of the Manchester Local Care Organisation and Trafford Local Care Organisation.

- Oxford Road Campus in Chorlton-on-Medlock
  - Manchester Royal Infirmary - General Acute Hospital with full Emergency Department, and specialist medical and surgical services
  - Manchester Royal Eye Hospital - Specialist Eye hospital
  - Royal Manchester Children's Hospital - Specialist Paediatric Hospital
  - Saint Mary's Hospital - Specialist Women's Health Hospital
- University Dental Hospital of Manchester - Specialist Dental Hospital, located near the Oxford Road Site within the University of Manchester
- South Manchester / Wythenshawe Hospital Campus
  - Wythenshawe Hospital - General Acute Hospital with full Emergency Department, and specialist medical and surgical services
  - Nightingale Breast Unit - Specialist Breast Unit
- North Manchester General Hospital - General Acute Hospital with full Emergency Department, and specialist medical and surgical services
- Trafford General Hospital - General Acute Hospital with Urgent Care Centre, rehabilitation and outpatient services
- Withington Community Hospital - Outpatient services
- Altrincham Hospital - Outpatient services

During the COVID-19 pandemic, the trust also ran the temporary NHS Nightingale Hospital North West, located at the Manchester Central Convention Complex.

== Services ==
The trust is the main provider of hospital care to approximately 750,000 people in the areas covered by the Manchester & Trafford Local Care Organisations. It is also the lead provider of multiple specialist services to the 2.8 million people in the Greater Manchester conurbation including:

- Breast
- Vascular
- Cardiac
- Respiratory
- Urology Cancer
- Paediatrics
- Women's Services
- Ophthalmology
- Genomic Medicine

The trust is also the largest single provider of specialist services in North West England. The trust is expected to become the lead provider for further sub-specialist services as part of the Manchester Single Hospital Service programme.

== Hospital Rebuilding Programmes ==
The trust is involved in two major hospital rebuild programmes involving its North Manchester General Hospital site and its Wythenshawe Hospital site.

The North Manchester Hospital rebuild is part of the national 'New Hospital Programme', and was announced by Boris Johnson during a visit to Manchester during the Conservative Party national conference in 2019. The hospital rebuild is estimated to cost £500m with the funding provided by the UK Government, and complete in 2030.

The Wythenshawe Hospital rebuild is part of a partnership between the trust, Manchester City Council, the Manchester Local Care Organisation and Bruntwood property company. The initial plans were approved by Manchester City Council on 18 March 2021. The plan includes a partial rebuild of the Wythenshawe hospital site, building of new housing and commercial spaces on former hospital and adjacent farm land, and potential extension of the manchester Tram system alongside the hospital.

== Developments ==
In January 2018 the trust secured a loan of £125 million from the Department of Health's Independent Trust Financing Facility. £50 million was to be used for rolling out the Allscripts electronic patient record, already used in Wythenshawe, on to the Central Manchester sites. The money was also to enable reconfiguration of the accident and emergency departments with separation of the flow of major and minor incidents, and a new primary care assessment space at the front doors, backlog maintenance at Wythenshawe and £12 million liquidity support. The trust decided in 2019 to use the electronic patient record system from Epic Systems, called Hive. The new EPR was launched on 8 September 2022 and provides a new ‘operating system’ for the trust, replacing previous IT systems, including multiple separate old electronic patient records and Patient Administration Systems and a number of smaller specialty systems over all its sites. The £181 million contract will last for 15 years.

A helipad was built on the top of the Grafton Street car park to serve the trust's hospitals at a cost of £3.9 million, which was raised by the trust's charity, Manchester Foundation Trust Charity. It is connected to the hospitals by a 130 metre long bridge 19 metres above street level. It is expected to serve about 312 patients airlifted to the site each year. It opened in May 2021. £1.36 million has been donated by the HELP Appeal.

In May 2021 planning approval was given for a major expansion of Manchester Royal Infirmary's emergency department and creation of six new operating theatres. The work is expected to be completed in 2024.

Centrica Business Solutions has a contract to install new energy infrastructure at Withington and Wythenshawe hospitals at a cost of £10.9 million. This will reduce their annual carbon emissions by about 25% and halve the energy bill.

In 2020 the trust started using Isansys Lifecare's Patient Status Engine, for COVID-19 patients both in hospital and at home. This collects continuous physiological data, including heart rate, respiration rate, heart rate variability, ECG, oxygen saturation, blood pressure, and body temperature. This generates an early warning score which enables earlier identification of those patients most in need of intervention.

The COVID-19 pandemic stimulated the development of virtual wards across the British NHS. Patients are managed at home, monitoring their own oxygen levels using an oxygen saturation probe if necessary and supported by telephone. The trust managed more than 350 patients from its 3 hospital sites at home in March 2020. The trust was also responsible for running the temporary NHS Nightingale Hospital North West hospital, located in Manchester.

In January 2021 the trust established a 15-year technology partnership with Siemens Healthineers with a value of approximately £125 million covering more than 350 radiology installations across eight hospital sites.

== Overseas patients ==
The trust issued invoices to patients thought to be ineligible for NHS treatment totalling £2.1 million in 2018–9, but only collected £0.3 million.

== Notable staff ==
- Judith Elizabeth Adams, clinical director of radiology
