= Janet Marsden =

Nurse professor

- Born: 1961; Manchester
- Died: 31 May 2018 (aged 56–57)
- Occupation: nurse
- Employer(s): Manchester Royal Eye Hospital, Manchester Metropolitan University
- Organization: Royal College of Nursing
- Known for: Her work on advanced nursing practice, especially in ophthalmic nursing
- Awards: FRCN

Janet Marsden FRCN, PhD, RGN, Nurse Professor (1961-2018) was a nurse recognised for her contributions to advanced nursing practice, ophthalmology and emergency care by the Royal College of Nursing and the Minais Gerais government.

== Early life and training ==
Marsden was born in Manchester, the daughter of Margaret (nee Bladon) and Graham Spence a teacher. She went to Sale grammar school and then began an undergraduate degree in chemistry at Manchester University, but, realising that she preferred interaction with people, she changed track a year into the course, instead undertaking general nurse training at Manchester Royal Infirmary in 1981, registering as an Adult nurse in 1984.

== Career ==
After qualifying Marsden secured a post at Manchester Royal Eye Hospital, eventually managing the ophthalmic Emergency Department and in 1994 becoming involved in developing a city-wide triage system. The checklist methodology of the triage system ensured detection of early warning signs in those arriving at emergency wards enabling quick and optimal decision taking. The system was hailed as revolutionising modern care which led to Marsden being recognised by her peers as one of the most influential people in her profession in a Nursing Times magazine poll called the Nursing Times 'Diamond 20'.

Marsden's academic studies continued during her career. She gained a BSc in Nursing Studies in 1993 and a Masters in Practitioner Research in 1995, leading to a PhD looking at issues in advanced nursing practice.

In 1996 Marsden moved into academia and was appointed to a full-time post at Manchester Metropolitan University. In this she ran the Master’s degree in Emergency Medicine. She also lectured, mentored and supervised research at PhD level. Marsden became Professor of Ophthalmology and Emergency Care leading an informal group of clinicians known as the Centre for Effective Emergency Care (CEEC).

== Further professional activity ==
Marsden's other professional activity included serving with the Health Research Authority being a member of the National Research and Ethics Advisory Panel. Between 2005 and 2009, she chaired the Ophthalmic Nursing Forum of the Royal College of Nursing (RCN), leading projects including a competence framework for ophthalmic nursing which she introduced into Australia. She served as a volunteer faculty member for both the World Sight Foundation and ORBIS, an international non-profit organisation dedicated to saving sight. Additionally Marsden was an active member of various professional groups including the Faculty of Emergency Nursing and the Royal Society of Medicine, also the Ministry of Defence Research Ethics Committee. In addition to her published works (as below) Marsden was an expert reviewer for a range of journals and publishers.

== Awards ==
2010 Fellowship of the Royal College of Nursing for her contribution to the areas of Ophthalmic and emergency nursing.

2011 The Grans Medal de Meriot do Saude an award from the Government of Minais Gerais in Brazil.

2012 The Royal College of Nursing/Novartis Ophthalmic Nursing Award.

== Publications ==
- Ophthalmic Care. (Keswick, M&K Publishing 2017)
- with Shaw, M.E. Care of the child with ophthalmic problems. (Keswick, M&K Publishing 2016)
- with Mackway-Jones, K. & Windle, J. Newton, M., Emergency triage: telephone triage and advice. BMJ Books (Wiley 2015)
- with Mackway-Jones, K. & Windle, J. Emergency Triage: Manchester Triage Group. 3rd Edition. (Chichester, Wiley-Blackwell 2014)
- Aspects of advanced nursing practice. PhD thesis (Manchester, Manchester Metropolitan University 2012)
- An evidence base for ophthalmic nursing practice. (Chichester, John Wiley & Sons 2007)
- Ophthalmic Care. (Chichester, John Wiley 2006)

In addition Marsden wrote a number of articles within the sphere of Ophthalmology, Many of these focusing on practical management within ophthalmic nursing.

== Death and personal life ==
Marsden died aged 57 on 31 May 2018. She is survived by her husband Dave Marsden whom she met when both were teenagers volunteering at a Red Cross holiday camp for disabled children. They married in 1981.
