= Skeletal Radiology =

- Discipline: Radiology, pathology, orthopedics
- Language: English
- Edited by: Murali Sundaram, Daniel I. Rosenthal, Juerg Hodler

Publication details
- History: 1976-present
- Publisher: Springer Science+Business Media
- Frequency: Monthly
- Impact factor: 1.737 (2016)

Standard abbreviations
- ISO 4: Skelet. Radiol.

Indexing
- CODEN: SKRADI
- ISSN: 0364-2348 (print); 1432-2161 (web)
- LCCN: 02575772
- OCLC no.: 02575772

Links
- Journal homepage; Online access

Skeletal Radiology is a peer-reviewed medical journal published by Springer Science+Business Media, covering disorders of the musculoskeletal system, including the spine. It is the official journal of The International Skeletal Society.

== Abstracting and indexing ==
The journal is abstracted and indexed in Current Contents/Clinical Medicine, EMBASE, PASCAL, PubMed/Medline, Science Citation Index, and Scopus. According to the Journal Citation Reports, the journal has a 2016 impact factor of 1.737.
