= Mike Deegan =

English healthcare administrator

Sir Michael Deegan, CBE, known as Mike Deegan, has been Chief Executive of Central Manchester University Hospitals NHS Foundation Trust and its various predecessors since 2001.

He was reckoned by the Health Service Journal to be the 54th most influential person in the English NHS in 2015. In August 2022 he announced his retirement.

He was previously chief executive at Warrington Hospital and North Cheshire Hospitals NHS Trust.

He was made a Commander of the Order of the British Empire in the 2003 Birthday Honours and knighted in the 2014 Birthday Honours.
