= Manchester Royal Eye Hospital =

- Manchester University NHS Foundation Trust
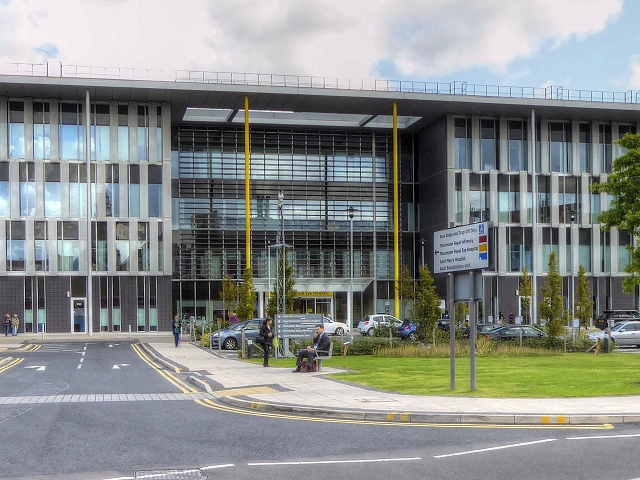
- Manchester Royal Eye Hospital

- Shown in Greater Manchester

Geography
- Location: Oxford Road, Manchester, England
- Coordinates: 53°27′43″N 2°13′43″W

Organisation
- Care system: NHS
- Type: Eye

History
- Founded: 1814; 212 years ago

Links
- Lists: Hospitals in England

Manchester Royal Eye Hospital is an ophthalmic hospital in Oxford Road, Manchester, England, managed by the Manchester University NHS Foundation Trust. It is on the same site as Manchester Royal Infirmary and St Mary's Hospital for Women and Children.

== History ==
The hospital was founded in 1814 on the initiative of William James Wilson and opened in King Street the following year. It moved to Faulkner Street in 1827, to Princess Street in 1874 and to St John's Street in 1882, before re-locating to a facility designed by Pennington & Bridgen in Oxford Road which was built between 1884 and 1886. In 1867 it was given permission to include the word "Royal" in its title. In 1915 the former hospital was still in use for outpatients. The building was damaged by a large bomb in the German air raid on 23 December 1940. A doctor and a nurse were killed. The building became Grade II listed in 1974 and has since been converted for other uses.

Services moved to a new building on the Royal Infirmary site accessible to patients in 2009 and officially opened by Queen Elizabeth II in 2012. Meanwhile, a new biomedical centre, Citylabs, was constructed on the old site, using both the frontage of the old Royal Eye Hospital building and a new 94,000 sq ft building at the rear, also opening in 2012.

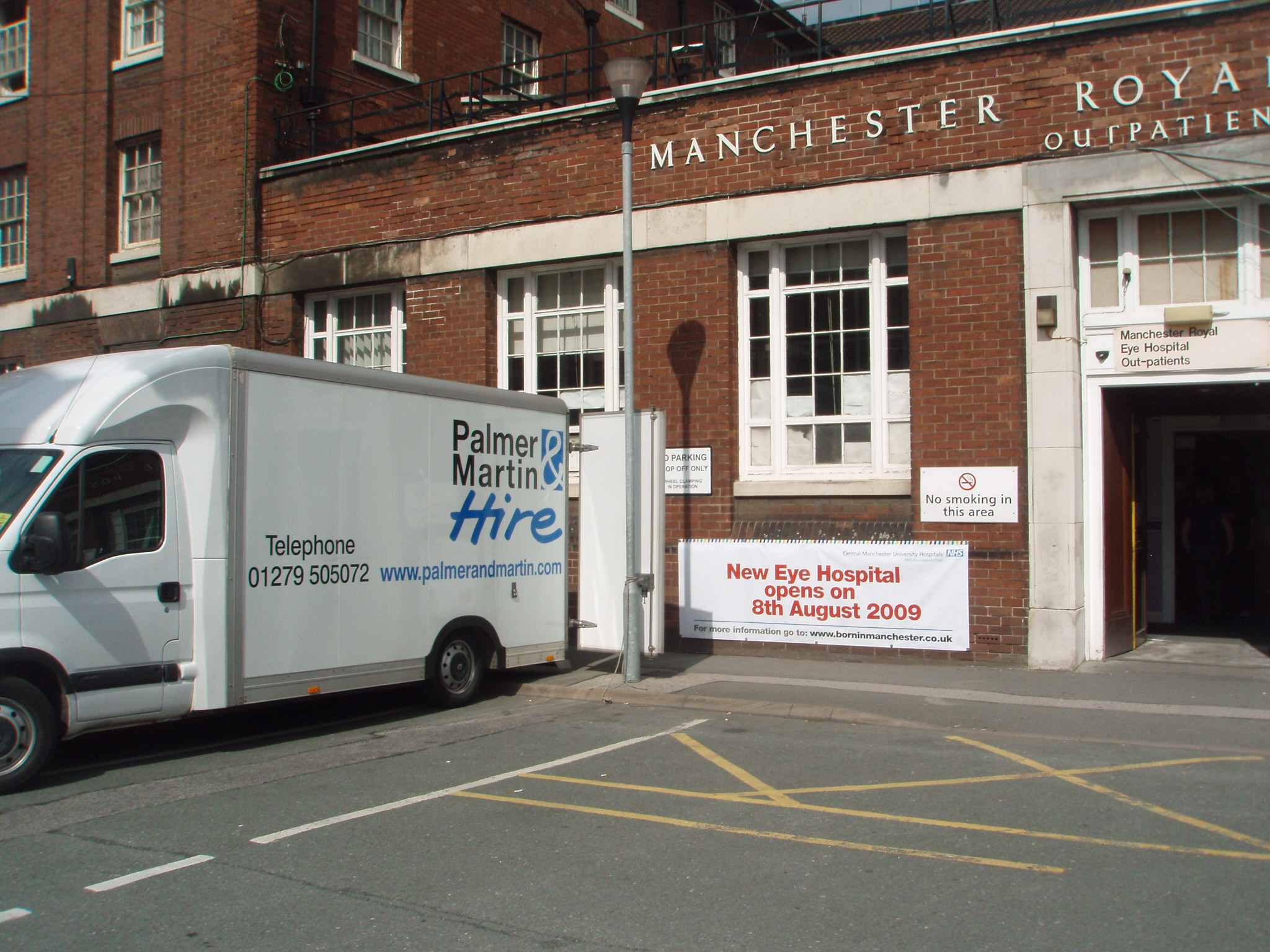
Manchester Royal Eye Hospital Outpatients moving in 2009

In November 2013 the Macular Society conducted a survey of NHS trusts not meeting critical four-week follow-up times to administer drugs that reverse or arrest macular degeneration and found that the hospital was struggling because it had "experienced a significant increase in demand coinciding with the introduction of a new treatment for patients with macular degeneration."

Consultant Ophthalmologist Paulo Stanga fitted the world's first visual prosthesis, an Argus retinal prosthesis for a patient with age-related macular degeneration to Ray Flynn, 80, in July 2015 at the hospital. He is the first person in the world to have both artificial and natural vision combined. Professor Stanga said "As far as I am concerned, the first results of the trial are a total success and I look forward to treating more dry AMD patients with the Argus II as part of this trial. We are currently recruiting four more patients to the trial in Manchester."

The hospital started a contract with EMS Healthcare in November 2015 to provide a mobile medical unit for up to 40 patients a day with wet age-related macular degeneration operating at Trafford General Hospital.

== See also ==
- Healthcare in Greater Manchester
- List of hospitals in England
