= Mark Cubbon (administrator) =

British healthcare official

Mark Cubbon is a British healthcare official. He was appointed Chief Executive of Manchester University NHS Foundation Trust in November 2022.

Cubbon was previously NHS England's chief delivery officer and before that chief executive of Portsmouth Hospitals University NHS Trust and had senior roles at various NHS providers in London. He trained at the University of Manchester and started his career as a nurse. Cubbon led the development of proposals for and establishing integrated care systems. His role at NHS England was on a secondment basis for two years.

Cubbon was earlier shortlisted for the chief executive position at Barts Health NHS Trust.

In October 2021 Cubbon told English hospitals to “immediately stop all delays” for ambulances stacking outside accident and emergency units after an ambulance services trust said the problem had reached “catastrophic” levels.

He apologised to council representatives in July 2022 about their experiences in setting up integrated care systems.

In 2020 he wrote a letter to the courts to explain the impact of violence on staff after a nurse was attacked on Boxing Day. He also asked Portsmouth residents to follow tier four rules. In his first year in Portsmouth he saw the emergency department's four-hour target hit its highest percentage for more than a year, the trust's finances stabilise and staff morale improve.
