= North Manchester General Hospital =

- Manchester University NHS Foundation Trust
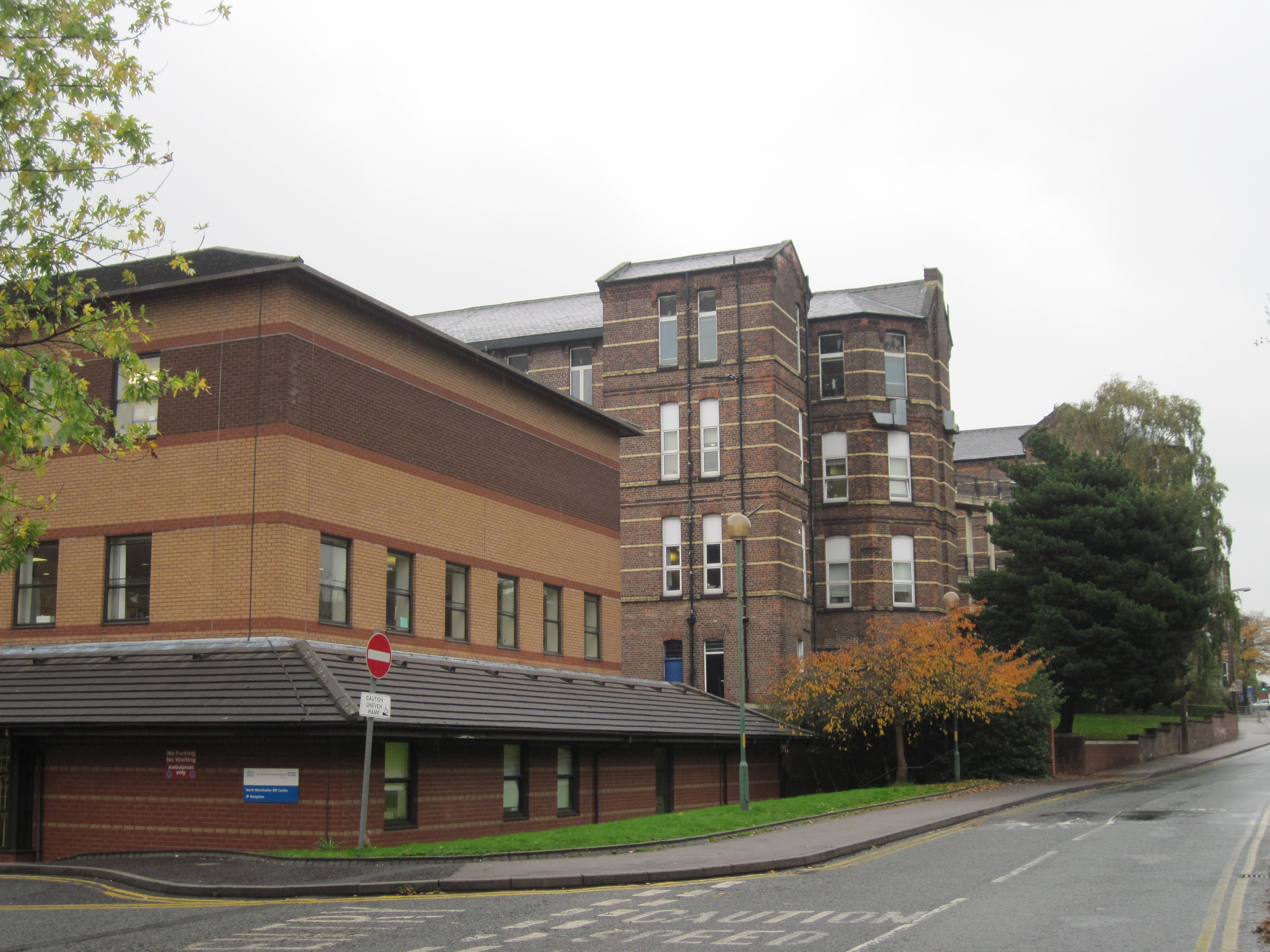
- North Manchester General Hospital (the older buildings in the background formed part of Delaunays Hospital)

- Shown in Greater Manchester

Geography
- Location: Crumpsall, Manchester, England, United Kingdom
- Coordinates: 53°31′N 2°14′W

Organisation
- Care system: Public NHS
- Type: District general

Services
- Emergency department: Yes Accident & Emergency
- Beds: 800

History
- Founded: 1977

Links
- Website: mft.nhs.uk/north-manchester-general-hospital
- Lists: Hospitals in England

North Manchester General Hospital (NMGH) is a large NHS hospital in Crumpsall, North Manchester, England. It is operated by Manchester University NHS Foundation Trust. There is an accident and emergency unit, together with a maternity unit, high dependency unit and a mental health wing. A plan to rebuild the hospital was announced by Boris Johnson in the 2019 General Election campaign, and in November 2020 a £54 million funding bid for improvement works was made by the Trust, Manchester City Council, and Manchester Health and Care Commissioning.

== History ==
=== Introduction ===
This extensive hospital site originally housed three separate hospitals: Crumpsall Hospital, Delaunays Hospital and Springfield Hospital. The three amalgamated to create North Manchester General Hospital in 1977.

=== Crumpsall Hospital ===
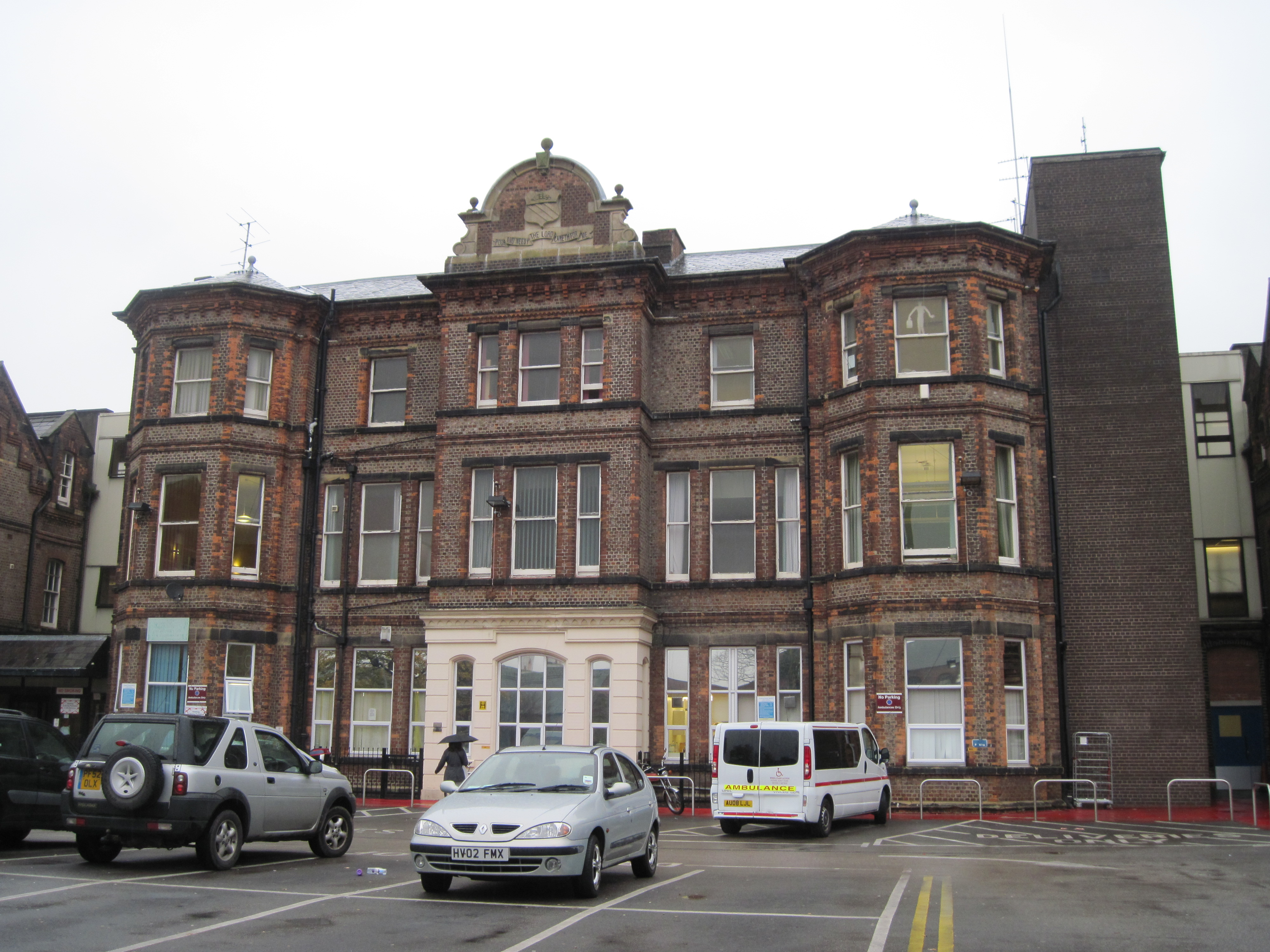
Crumpsall Hospital built as an infirmary in 1876

Crumpsall Hospital was built as an infirmary for the Manchester Union Workhouse and opened in 1876. (Note: The Manchester Union Workhouse itself developed into Springfield Hospital)

In 1914 the hospital was a receiving station firstly for 500 casualties from Belgium. By 1924 there was an X-ray department, ear, eye and dental departments and a chiropody room. There were then 4 or 5 resident medical officers, who usually stayed for about 2 years, rotating through the different specialities. In 1927 a new dispensary and a separate block for operating theatres, X-ray, dental and recovery rooms was built.

The Infirmary had 1,440 beds in 1928 with a further 600 in the attached mental department. The patients included both chronic and acute cases and both acute cases and the work of the obstetric and gynaecological department had been increasing. The hospital had a bacteriological and pathological laboratory and was a registered training school for nurses both in general medical and surgical work and in midwifery. in 1929 it became a municipal hospital.

In 1948 the hospital joined the National Health Service. In 1951 a nurses sick bay, a premature babies unit and a new Physiotherapy department were opened. In 1952 the hospital was recognised by Manchester University for clinical teaching and some of the senior medical staff were appointed honorary lecturers.

=== Delaunays Hospital ===
Delaunays Hospital was designed by Thomas Worthington as a workhouse and hospital for the Prestwich Board of Guardians and opened in 1869. The Prestwich Workhouse and Hospital was absorbed into the Manchester Union Workhouse in 1915.

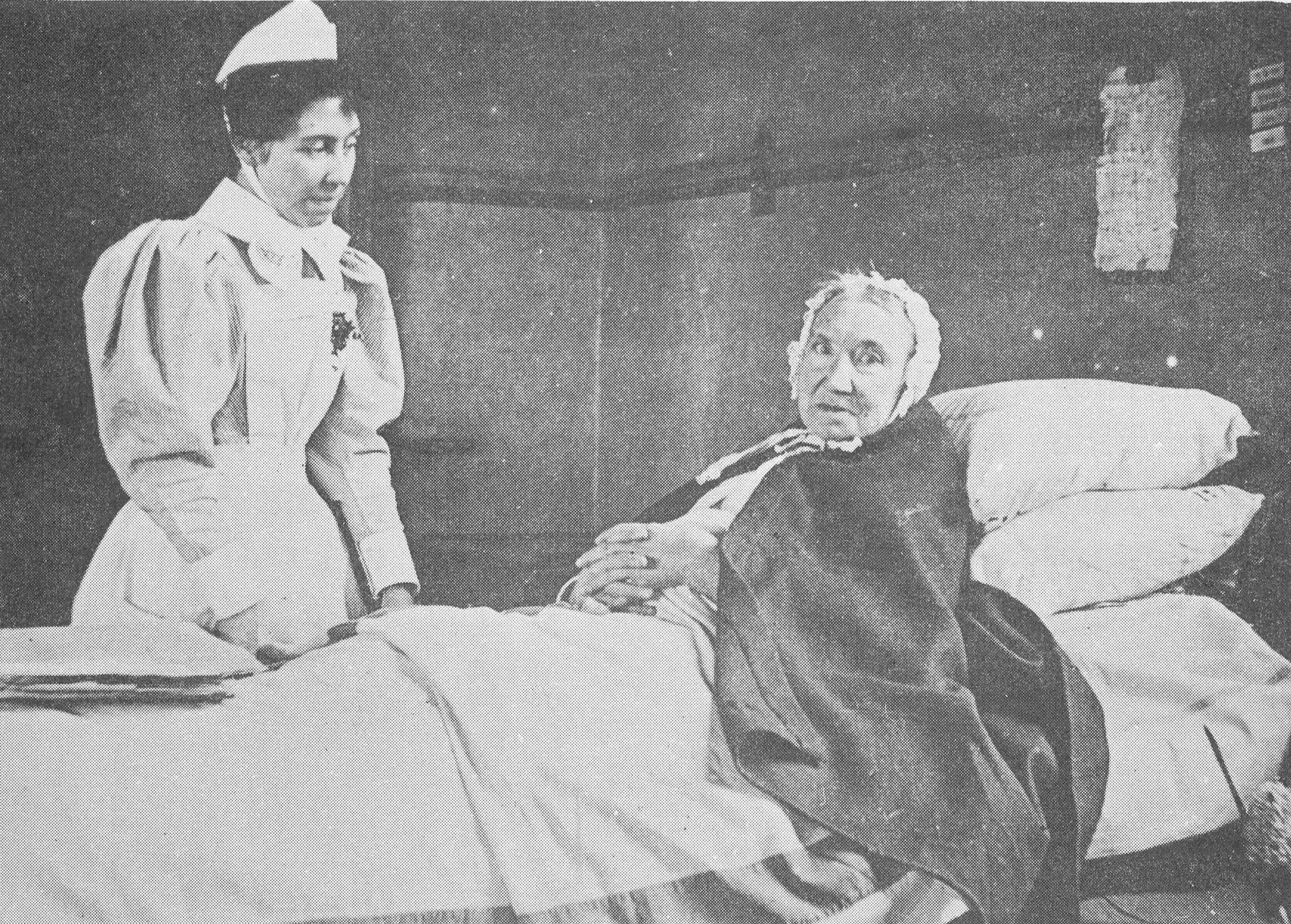
Patient in bed with nurse, diet and prescription board at Crumpsall Hospital in 1890

=== Springfield Hospital ===
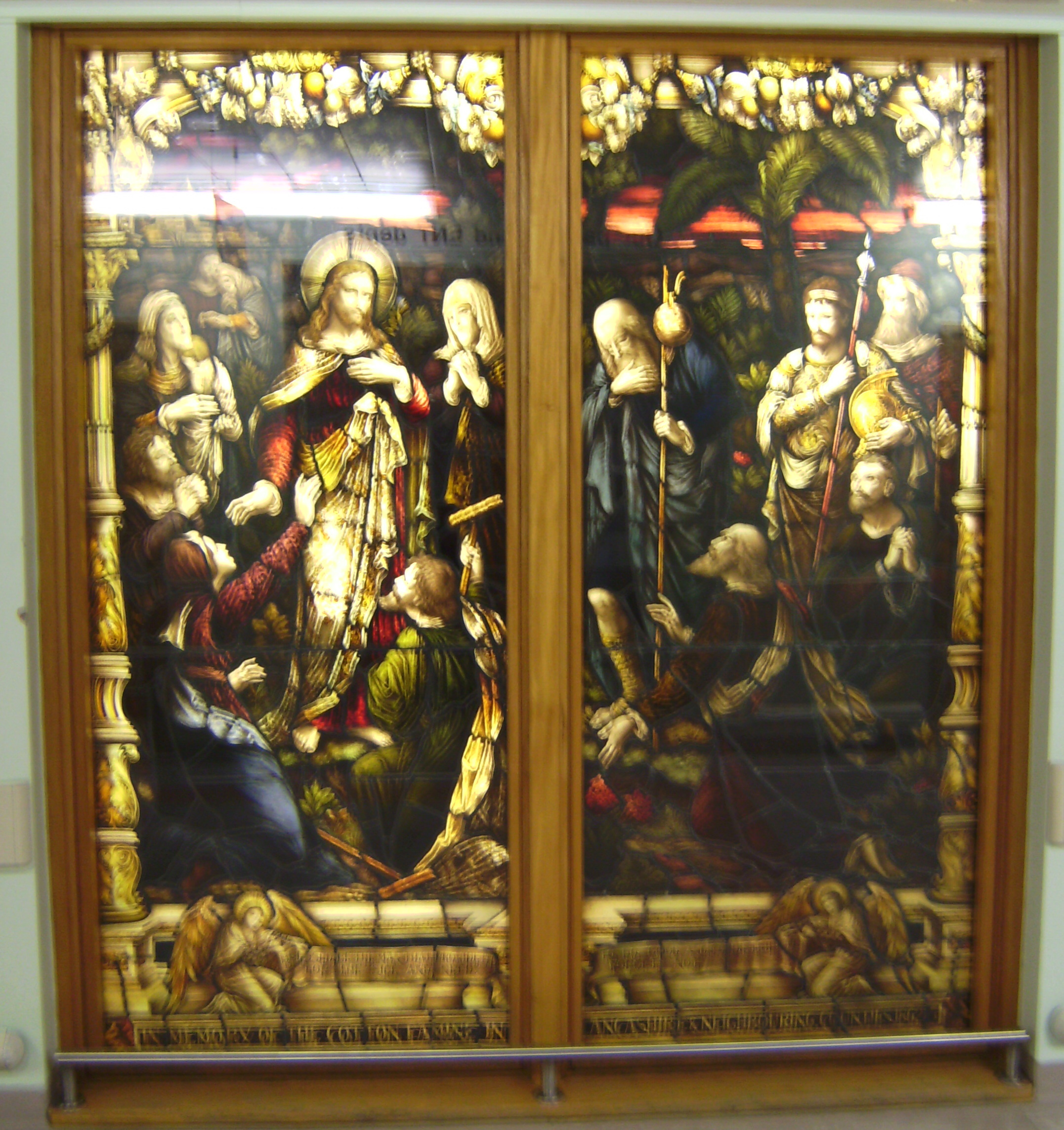
The Cotton Famine Window, North Manchester General Hospital, taken from a convalescent home in Southport

Springfield Hospital had its origins in the new Manchester Union Workhouse, designed by Mills and Murgatroyd, and completed in 1853. The workhouse developed into a hospital for the mentally ill known as the Crumpsall Institution. It was renamed Park House in 1939 and became Springfield Hospital on joining the National Health Service in 1948.

=== Post-merger ===
Crumpsall Hospital, Delaunays Hospital and Springfield Hospital amalgamated to create North Manchester General Hospital in 1977. After the Victoria Memorial Jewish Hospital closed in 1992, the Jewish Victoria Wing was established at the North Manchester General Hospital. (Note: The Victoria Memorial Jewish Hospital was opened in 1904 with 16 beds. By 1928 the number of beds had increased to 62 and at that time a new block containing about 28 beds was being planned. The staff consisted of two resident house surgeons and 12 honorary medical and surgical staff.) (Note: The need for a Jewish hospital was recognised in the late 19th century because poor Jews were unable to observe their religious traditions at the Manchester Infirmary and also language difficulties.) Similarly, after the Northern Hospital for Women and Children closed in 1994, women's and children's services were centralised at the North Manchester General Hospital (Note: The Northern Hospital for Women and Children was founded in 1856 as a dispensary in Stevenson Square, Manchester by Dr. August Schoepf Merei and Dr. James Whitehead. In 1867 it moved to a site in the northern suburbs and during the next 70 years expanded progressively until in 1928 it had 22 beds for women patients and 51 cots for children. Further expansion was then planned and Sir Edward Holt, Bart., donated a site at Alms Hill, Cheetham, intended for the construction of a new and larger hospital.) and a new women's and children's block opened in June 2010. Plans to build a new intermediate care centre were announced in 2019.

=== Pennine Acute Hospitals NHS Trust ===
The hospital was part of the Pennine Acute Hospitals NHS Trust (PAHT) from 28 January 2002 until April 2020. To address health inequalities in Greater Manchester, the "healthier together" plan was published which included the unprecedented plan to demerge NMGH from Pennine Acute Hospitals NHS Trust and merge it into a newly formed NHS trust covering the City of Manchester & the Borough of Trafford by 2020. In march 2016, PAHT was rated as "inadequate" by the CQC, and the organisation asked the Salford Royal NHS Foundation Trust to assume immediate leadership of the trust prior to the future demerger of the North Manchester General Hospital site. The Pennine Acute trust was finally dissolved on 2 October 2021 following the transfer of NMGH to Manchester University NHS Foundation trust, with the other remaining hospitals in the trust joining the Northern Care Alliance NHS Group alongside Salford Royal Hospital.

=== Manchester University NHS Foundation Trust ===
From 1 April 2020, the hospital came under the management of Manchester University NHS Foundation Trust under a management agreement with Northern Care Alliance NHS Group to enable the separation of the hospital from the remainder of the old Pennine Acute Hospitals NHS Trust. On 1 April 2021, the hospital formally joined Manchester University NHS Foundation Trust, with the trust taking full control and responsibility for managing the hospital.

The new MFT trust was formed by the merger of Central Manchester University Hospitals NHS Foundation Trust with the University Hospital of South Manchester NHS Foundation Trust on 1 October 2017, with the take over of North Manchester General Hospital part of the "Manchester Single Hospital Service" plan. The plan aimed to reduce health inequalities across the City of Manchester & Trafford by running the hospitals across the area together, instead of separately in the 3 previously existing hospital trusts.

== See also ==
- Healthcare in Greater Manchester
- List of hospitals in England
