= Withington Community Hospital =

- Manchester University NHS Foundation Trust
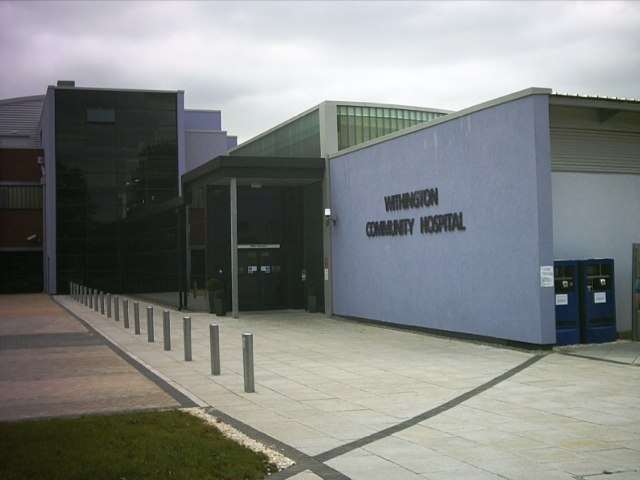
- The new Withington hospital facilities

- Shown in Greater Manchester

Geography
- Location: Manchester, England, United Kingdom
- Coordinates: 53°25′31″N 2°14′45″W

Organisation
- Care system: Public NHS
- Type: Specialist
- Affiliated university: University of Manchester

Services
- Emergency department: No Previously Level 1 Trauma centre
- Speciality: Diagnostics

History
- Founded: 1854

Links
- Website: mft.nhs.uk/withington/
- Lists: Hospitals in England

Withington Community Hospital is a hospital in south Manchester, England, managed by the Manchester University NHS Foundation Trust.

== History ==
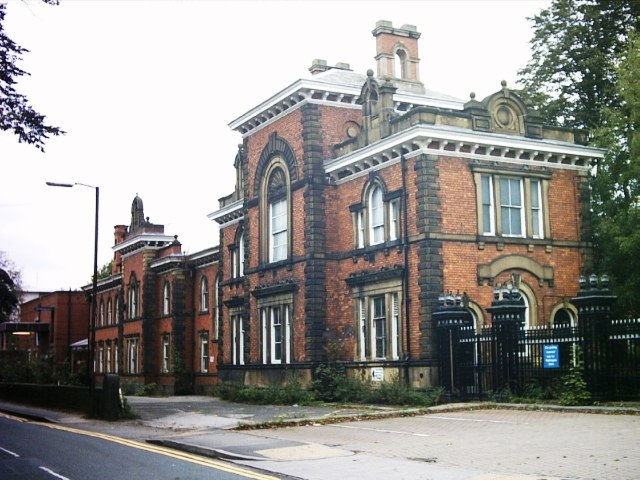
The old Withington hospital, Nell Lane

Originally known as the Chorlton Barlow Moor Work House, the hospital was purpose-built between 1854 and 1855 as a workhouse for the poor of the Chorlton Poor Law Union, which covered most of south Manchester, and was administered from Chorlton-on-Medlock. In 1859 it had as inmates 458 adults (including minors of 17 and upwards) and 195 children. In the 1880s conditions were improved at the instigation of Dr John Milson Rhodes one of the board members: the removal of the children to Styal Cottage Homes was one of his reforms. In 1864–66, it was converted into a hospital for the poor with the notable British nurse, Florence Nightingale, quoted as saying "... your hospital plan will be one of the best, if not the best, in the country" when writing to the architect Thomas Worthington–upon initial observation of the plans.

The hospital also provided support for the military just after the outbreak of the First World War in 1914 and German prisoners of war were kept there. At this time it was known as simply Withington Hospital, being named that after a change in 1910 (until 1904, it was outside the city of Manchester in Withington Urban District). The frontage of 1854–55 is showy and the chapel is Italianate in style: behind were the seven pavilions of the hospital of 1864–66 with many later buildings all over the site. In the later years all the old buildings were taken over by the hospital and a new smaller workhouse was built on the opposite side of Nell Lane: this closed in 1928.

The hospital was occupied by the military for some time before reverting to civilian patients: in 1929 it had beds for 1,300 patients, 12 pavilions and 11 visiting staff. In 1948 the hospital joined the National Health Service under Aneurin Bevan. At its height, the hospital was the largest teaching hospital in Europe, thanks in part to its affiliation with the University of Manchester, which has one of the largest medical schools in the north of England.

During the 1990s the hospital faced closure; its fate was sealed when the doors shut in 2002. When this occurred, the trust operating the then defunct hospital relocated units across the city. Three of the former buildings are Grade II listed. In 2007 a new hospital building was built, to the south-east of the old site, and became a primary care base providing specialist care to those who are awaiting diagnostic treatment and day surgery appointments.

== Re-development ==
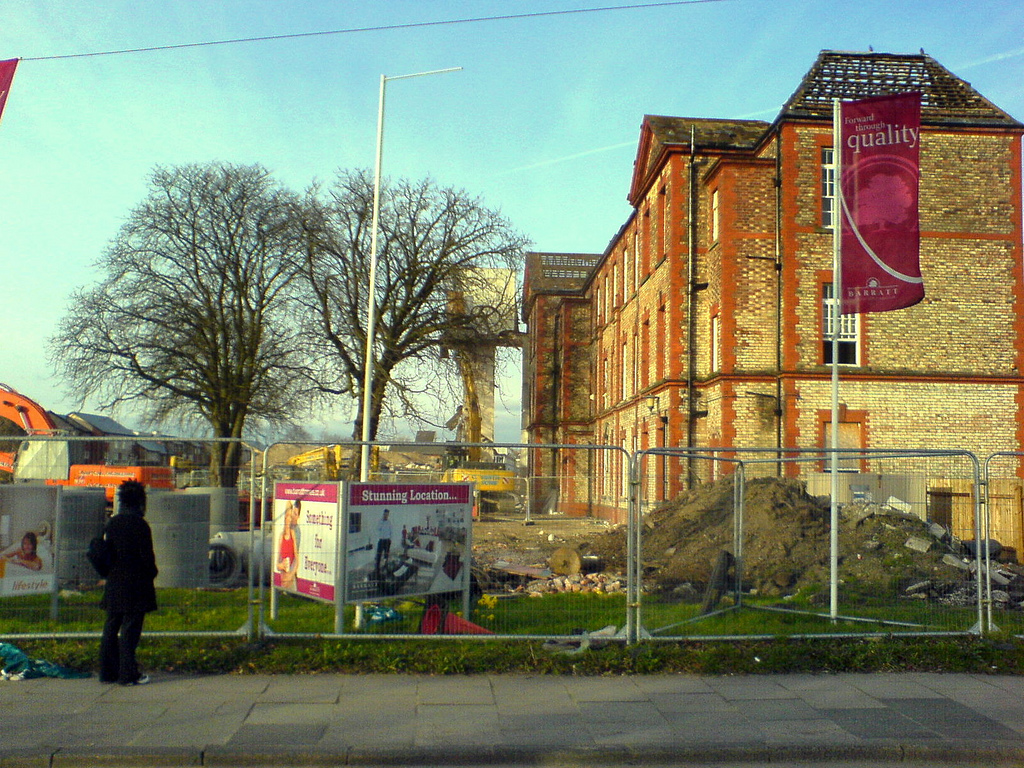
Former premises under re-development

In July 2008, the named developers (PJ Livesey) of the older buildings of the hospital announced that the plans to build 360 homes had been shelved. The structures were to be considered for a full refurbishment into 116 apartments, 231 flats, 14 houses and other structures. It was confirmed this action was a result of the 2008 financial crisis affecting potential buyers.

== See also ==
- Listed buildings in Manchester-M20
- Healthcare in Greater Manchester
- List of hospitals in England

== Bibliography ==
- Sim, R. & Kitchen, H. (1999) More Than a Place of Healing: an anthology of memories, memorabilia and anecdotes of Withington Hospital Manchester Manchester: Hospital Arts
