= Altrincham Hospital =

British hospital

- Manchester University NHS Foundation Trust
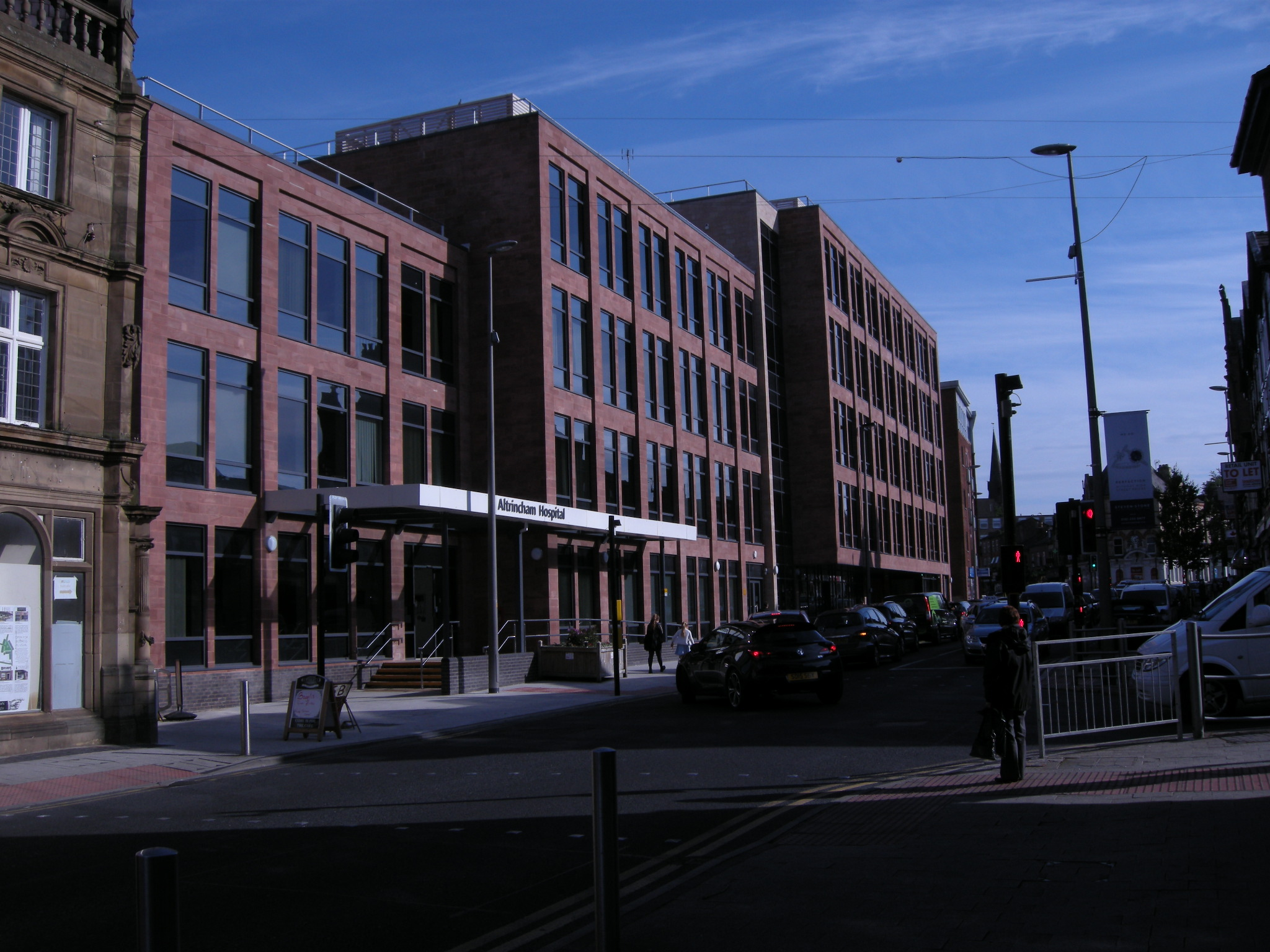
- Altrincham Hospital

- Shown in Greater Manchester

Geography
- Location: Railway Street, Altrincham, Greater Manchester, England, United Kingdom
- Coordinates: 53.3850°N 2.3515°W

Organisation
- Care system: Public NHS
- Type: Community hospital

Services
- Emergency department: No Accident & Emergency

History
- Founded: 2015

Links
- Website: mft.nhs.uk
- Lists: Hospitals in England

Altrincham Hospital is a modern community hospital on Railway Street in Altrincham, Greater Manchester, England. It is managed by the Manchester University NHS Foundation Trust.

== History ==
The hospital was built to replace the aging Altrincham General Hospital in Market Street. The new hospital, which was built by Pochins, a Cheshire-based construction company, opened in April 2015. The new facilities installed at the commissioning of the new hospital included digital radiography equipment costing £350,000.
