= Wythenshawe Hospital =

Teaching hospital in South Manchester, England

- Manchester University NHS Foundation Trust
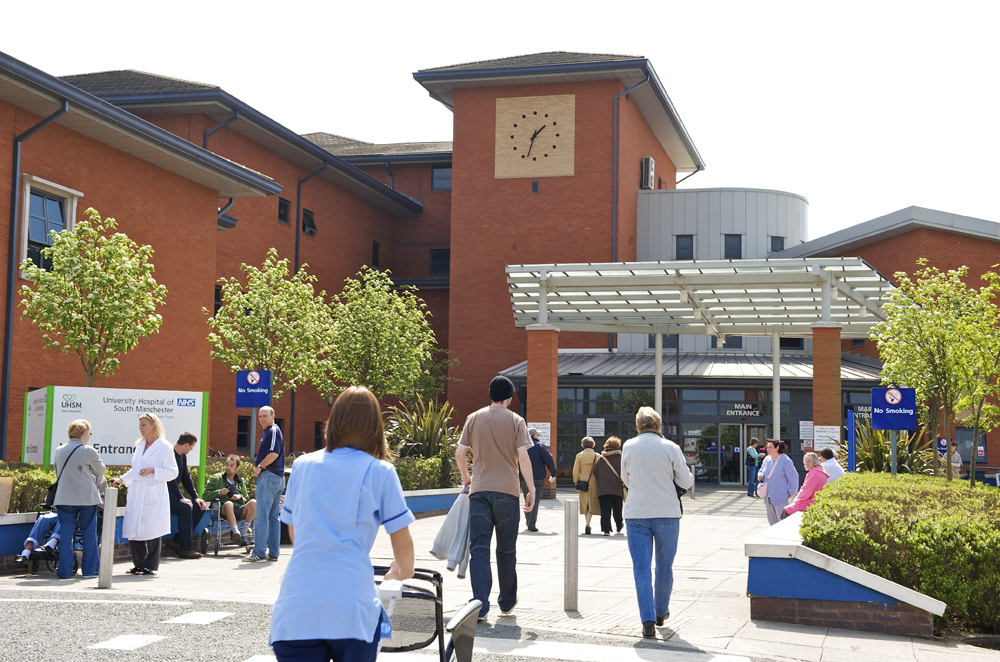

- Shown in Greater Manchester

Geography
- Location: Southmoor Road, Wythenshawe, Manchester, England
- Coordinates: 53.3897384°N 2.2950107°W

Organisation
- Care system: National Health Service
- Type: General
- Affiliated university: University of Manchester

Services
- Beds: 950

History
- Founded: 2001

Links
- Website: mft.nhs.uk/wythenshawe/

Wythenshawe Hospital (previously University Hospital of South Manchester) is a large NHS teaching hospital in Wythenshawe, South Manchester, England. It provides general medical services to the local and regional area as well as being a national centre for respiratory medicine and cardiothoracic surgery. It is one of the larger hospitals within Manchester University NHS Foundation Trust.

== History ==
The present Wythenshawe Hospital developed on the site of the former Baguley Sanatorium, which opened on 4 October 1902. It became a 150-bed sanatorium for the sole treatment of tuberculosis patients in 1912. The idea of Wythenshawe Hospital was initially discussed in 1939. An Emergency Medical Services hospital – consisting of rows of wooden huts – was constructed and used to treat soldiers who had been injured or burned. This was the foundation of the hospital's specialisation in burns and plastic surgery. The hospital was substantially developed in the 1960s as part of Enoch Powell's 1962 Hospital Plan.

The 35 year private finance initiative contract for Wythenshawe Hospital, signed in 1998, was one of the earliest in the NHS. The hospital was designed by WS Atkins, built by Alfred McAlpine at a cost of £113 million and opened in 2001. Facilities management services are provided by Sodexo.

The contract provided for stepped payments – charges were low initially but rise steeply between 2015 and 2023 falling again in the last 10 years of the contract. This has put the Trust under considerable financial pressure and a financial recovery plan has been imposed by Monitor. In June 2014, the Trust was forced to borrow £25 million from the Department of Health in order to meet the increased repayment.

== Current services ==
Wythenshawe Hospital was a founding member of the Manchester Academic Health Science Centre and a teaching hospital of Manchester Medical School.

It is still a centre of expertise in respiratory disease and the North West Lung Centre houses the Adult Cystic Fibrosis Centre and the UK National Aspergillosis Centre. It has established a successful rapid access programme for pulmonary investigations and diagnosis so that nearly half of patients are now starting treatment within 28 days.
