= Jonathan Michael =

British civil servant

Sir Jonathan Michael is a British nephrologist and medical executive. From 2000 to 2007, he was the chief executive of Guy's and St Thomas' NHS Trust where he received his medical training, qualifying in 1970, before his 20-year career as a clinical nephrologist. He spent much of his medical career at Queen Elizabeth Hospital, Birmingham, before becoming first medical director and chief executive of University Hospital Birmingham NHS Trust.

In 2007, he became the head of British Telecom's Health division. In 2010, it was announced that he would be moving back into the NHS as Chief Executive of Oxford Radcliffe Hospitals NHS Trust.

He announced in 2014 that he would be leaving the trust and is to become the chief medical officer of the 6PM Group, an IT software firm.

In January 2016, he was appointed to provide independent oversight of plans for a “single hospital service” in Manchester.

He was knighted in the 2005 New Year Honours.
