= School of Medical Sciences, University of Manchester =

Medical school in Manchester, England

Coordinates: 53°27′50″N 2°13′51″W

Manchester Medical School
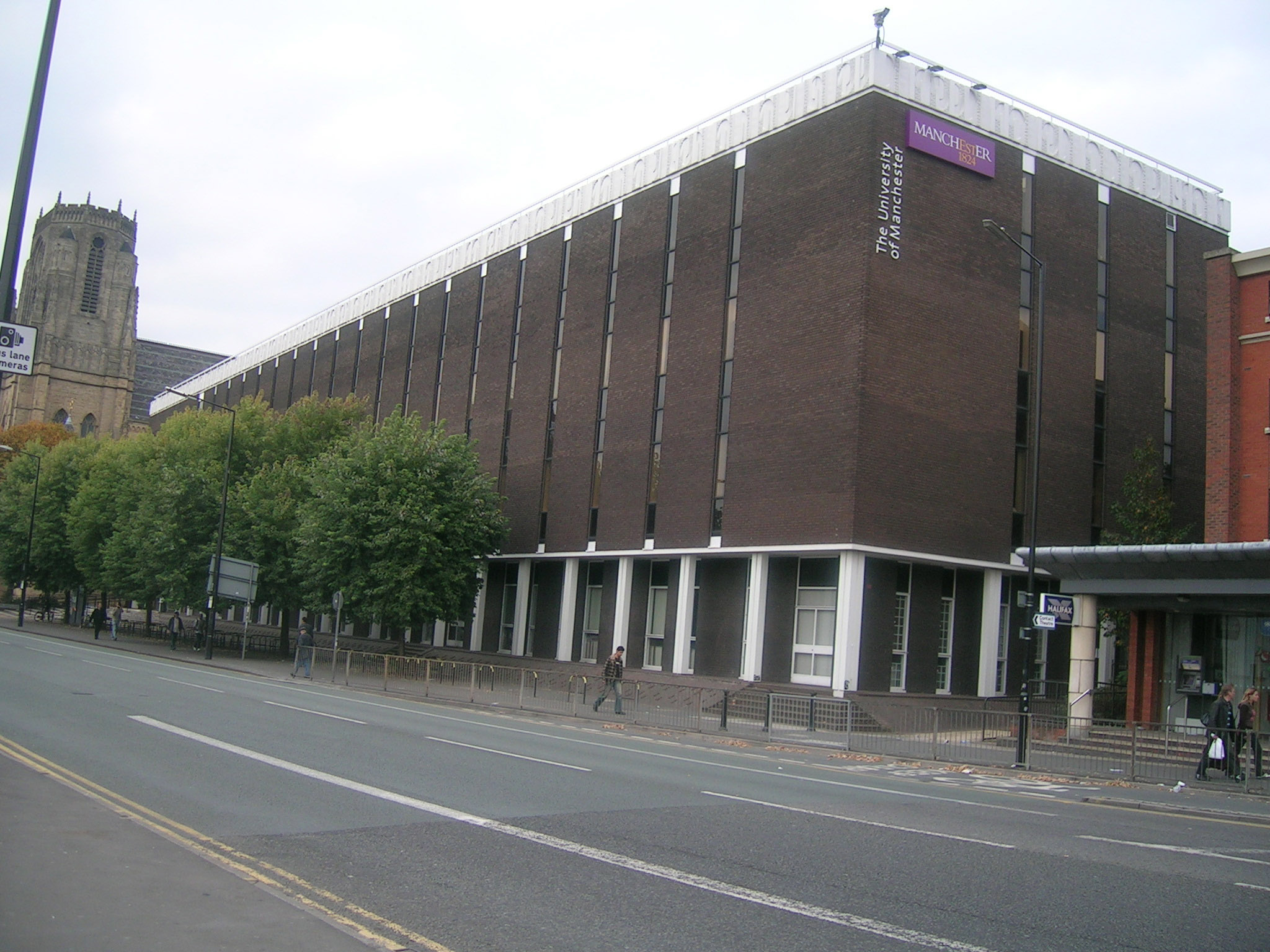
- Type: Medical school
- Established: 1873
- Dean: Professor Tony Heagerty
- Location: Manchester, Greater Manchester, England
- Affiliations: University of Manchester
- Website: www.bmh.manchester.ac.uk/about/structure/school-medical-sciences/

The School of Medical Sciences is the medical school of the University of Manchester, located in Manchester, England. It is the third oldest medical school in England and the largest medical school in the United Kingdom, with around 6,000 undergraduates, 3,000 postgraduates and 2,000 staff. The Faculty is a member of the Manchester Academic Health Science Centre and has four affiliated teaching hospitals at Manchester Royal Infirmary, Wythenshawe Hospital, Salford Royal Hospital and the Royal Preston Hospital.

== History of the Medical School ==
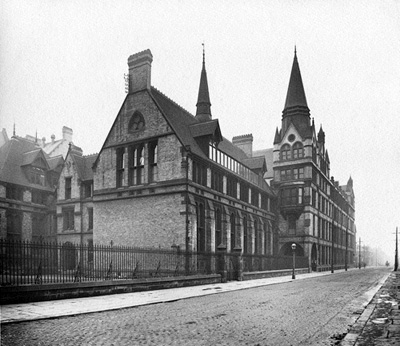
The first home of the Medical School in Coupland Street, Chorlton on Medlock (as seen in 1908 looking west)

Medical teaching in Manchester began when Charles White founded the first modern hospital in the Manchester district, the Manchester Infirmary (later the Manchester Royal Infirmary), in 1752. He was followed by Joseph Jordan, who opened a School of Anatomy in 1814. In the intervening 60 years more than one private medical school existed in Manchester: the most successful was the Pine Street medical school, not far south of the Infirmary. A faculty of medicine opened in 1873 (at Owens College), and medical degrees were awarded by the Victoria University from 1883. The school was made co-educational in 1899 after a long and contentious debate about whether women could be members of the College at all. The first female medical student to qualify Catherine Chisholm practised as a paediatrician after graduating. The success of the school meant that the building needed to be extended twice, in 1883 and 1894. From 1903/04 degrees were awarded by the Victoria University of Manchester.

A considerable space was allocated to the library of the Manchester Medical Society (founded 1834) which until 1930 remained in their possession while accommodated in the University. The library became part of the university library at that time and remained in the building until 1981 when it was transferred into the present Main Library building of the University of Manchester Library (part of the rare books went to the John Rylands Library). On the centenary of the medical society in 1934 the medical library was enriched by the Manchester Collection of E. Bosdin Leech relating to the medical history of the Manchester district. From 1919 the Deaf Education collection was established and was significantly enlarged by Abraham Farrar's bequest.

Additional departments were added from time to time: chronologically these were pharmaceutics, dentistry, and public health. A dental hospital was associated with the department of dentistry.

Until 1908 the Manchester Royal Infirmary was at Piccadilly a mile away from the school but in 1908 it moved to a new site on Oxford Road much nearer the medical school and the two institutions were interdependent. The medical school expanded greatly in the 1950s, culminating in the opening of the Stopford Building in 1973 and additionally accepting medical students from University of St Andrews (who have completed their pre-clinical course at St Andrews) and International Medical University, for their clinical studies.

== The Medical School today ==
The School of Medical Sciences is split into six different divisions, each with their own research specialties:

- Cancer Sciences
- Cardiovascular Sciences
- Dentistry
- Developmental Biology and Medicine
- Diabetes, Endocrinology and Gastroenterology
- Medical Education

Pre-clinical teaching is based at the Stopford Building on Oxford Road, Manchester, for the first two years. Clinical teaching takes place over four teaching 'sectors' in Greater Manchester and Lancashire. Teaching sectors in Greater Manchester are Central Manchester University Hospitals NHS Foundation Trust (incorporating Manchester Royal Infirmary, Saint Mary's Hospital and the Royal Manchester Children's Hospital); Salford Royal Hospital; and Wythenshawe Hospital. The Royal Preston Hospital in Lancashire also serves as a Manchester Medical School teaching sector.

== Notable alumni ==
- John Charnley, orthopaedic surgeon, pioneer in hip replacement.
- Hilary Critchley, Professor of Reproductive Medicine/Honorary Consultant in Obstetrics and Gynaecology at The University of Edinburgh.
- Dame Sally Davies, Chief Medical Officer for England 2010–2019.
- Professor Sir Robert Lechler, immunologist.
- Brian Day, President of the Canadian Medical Association 2007-2008.
- Shepherd Dawson, psychologist.
- Julius Dreschfeld, leading British physician and pathologist at the end of the 19th century.
- John Haggie, President of the Canadian Medical Association 2011-2012. Minister of Health and Community Services, Newfoundland and Labrador December 2015 – present.
- Archibald Vivian Hill, awarded Nobel Prize in 1922 for his discovery relating to the production of heat in the muscle.
- Ian Jacobs, gynaecologist and former vice-president of the University of Manchester.
- Ralph Kohn, British medical scientist and founder of the Kohn foundation. He was knighted in the 2010 New Year Honours for services to science, music and charity.
- Sumant Mehta, Indian physician and social worker.
- David H.H. Metcalfe, academic general practitioner, Professor Of General Practice University of Manchester, President Royal College of General Practitioners.
- David Nott, general & vascular surgeon.
- Mumtaz Patel, president of the Royal College of Physicians of London and nephrologist
- Sir Harry Platt, 1st Baronet, orthopaedic surgeon.
- Sir John Randall, developer of the cavity magnetron.
- Herchel Smith, a researcher at the University of Manchester, developed an inexpensive way of producing chemicals that stop women ovulating during their monthly menstrual cycle in 1961.
- John Stopford, Baron Stopford of Fallowfield, anatomist; vice-chancellor.
- Sir John Sulston, awarded Nobel Prize in 2002 for his discoveries concerning 'genetic regulation of organ development and programmed cell death'.
- Raymond Tallis, gerontologist.
- Nesta Wells, first British female police surgeon.
