= University Dental Hospital of Manchester =

- Manchester University NHS Foundation Trust
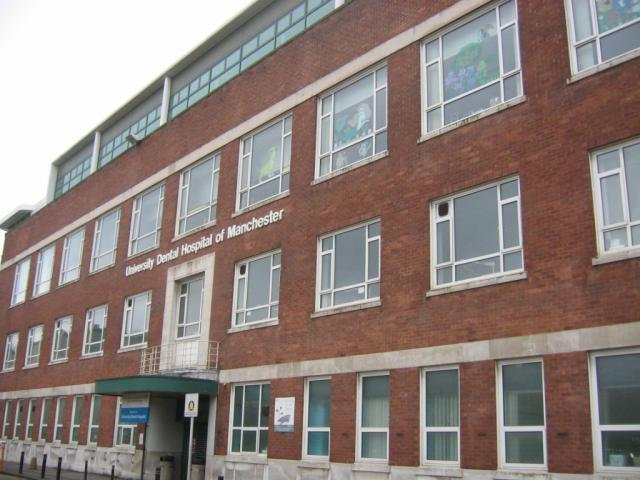
- Current building used by the Dental Hospital, Bridgeford Street frontage

- Shown in Greater Manchester

Geography
- Location: Manchester, England
- Coordinates: 53°28′N 2°14′W

Organisation
- Care system: NHS
- Type: Specialist

Services
- Speciality: Dentistry

History
- Founded: 1884

The University Dental Hospital of Manchester is a dental facility in Manchester, England. It is managed by Manchester University NHS Foundation Trust.

== History ==
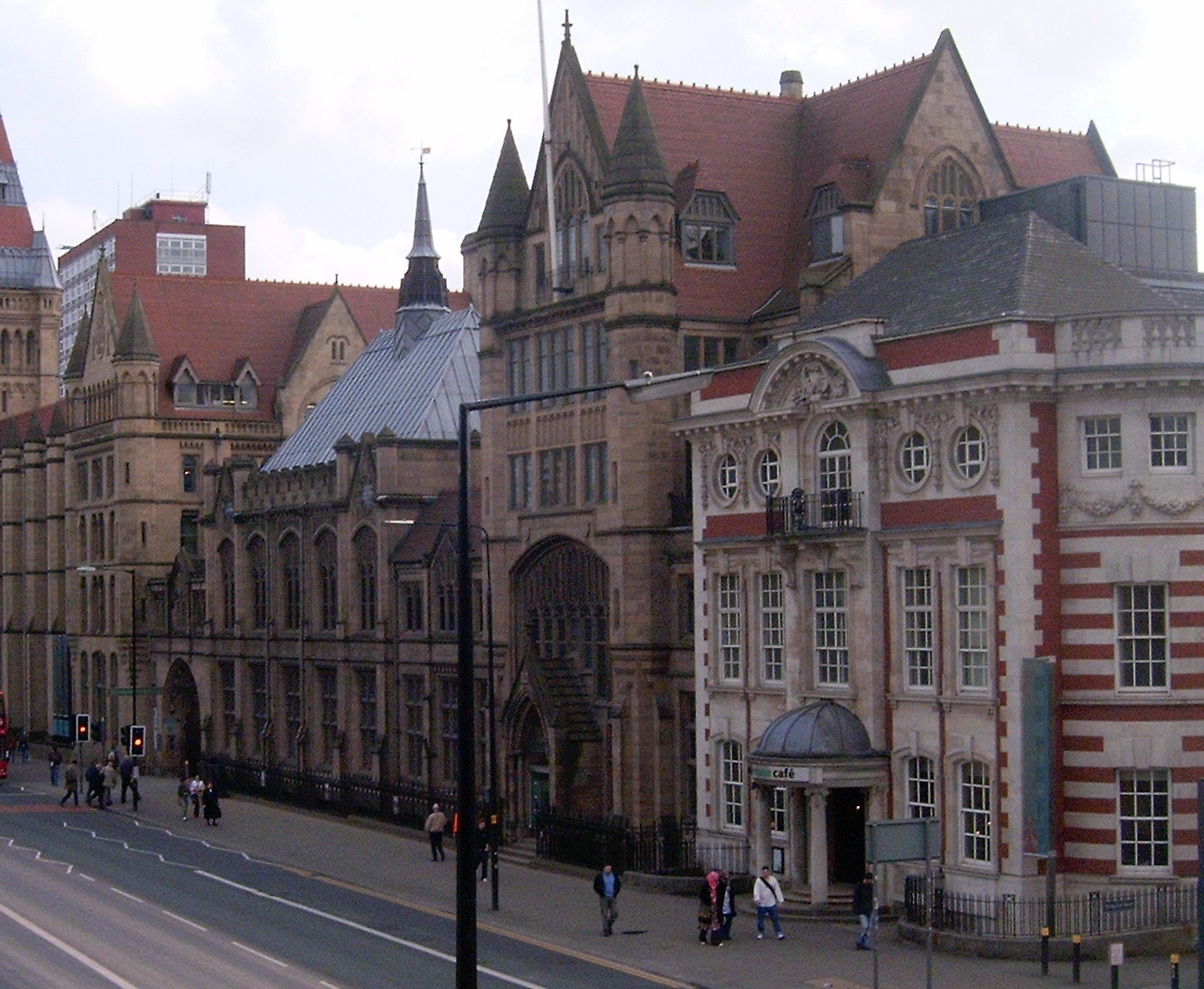
Oxford Road frontage of the Manchester Museum (the Baroque style building in the foreground is the former Dental Hospital)

The Dental Hospital was established in association with the School of Medicine at Owens College in 1884. It was then at Grosvenor Street, Chorlton-on-Medlock and removed to another house, in Devonshire Street, in 1892. Fund raising was slow in response to a public appeal and only in 1908 was the hospital able to occupy a new building on Oxford Road next to the Manchester Museum, designed in the Edwardian Baroque style by the architects Charles Heathcote & Sons. In 1909 the dental hospital established an orthodontics department.

In the 1940s, a new hospital was built further west on Bridgeford Street through the generosity of Sir Samuel Turner (1878–1955). The architect was Hubert Worthington and the works were carried out between 1939 and 1940: later this facility was extended from three wings to four, by the construction of the south wing during 1951 and 1952. Turner's endowment was £99,000.

This is now the University Dental Hospital of Manchester; the facility was enlarged by the construction of an additional top floor in the 1990s. The old hospital building was later used for scientific teaching and later still by the Manchester Museum which still occupies it.

== See also ==
- Healthcare in Greater Manchester
- List of hospitals in England
