= Trafford General Hospital =

NHS hospital

- Manchester University NHS Foundation Trust
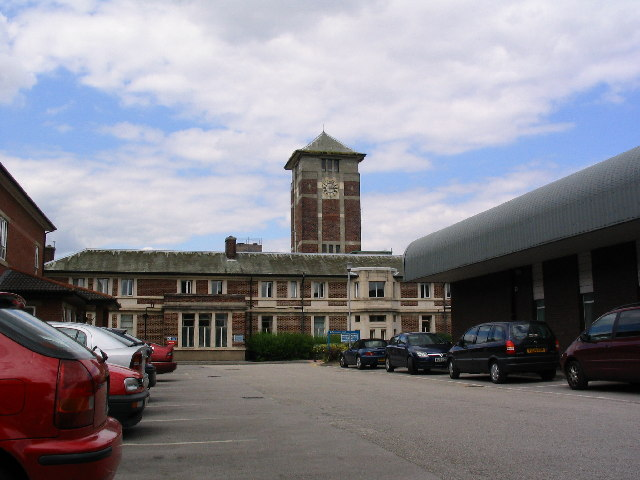
- Trafford General Hospital

- Shown in Greater Manchester

Geography
- Location: Davyhulme, Trafford, England, United Kingdom
- Coordinates: 53.45406°N 2.37068°W

Organisation
- Care system: Public NHS
- Type: Teaching
- Affiliated university: University of Manchester

Services
- Emergency department: No Accident & Emergency
- Beds: 230

History
- Founded: 1 June 1929

Links
- Website: mft.nhs.uk/trafford/
- Lists: Hospitals in the United Kingdom

Trafford General Hospital is a district general hospital in Davyhulme, Greater Manchester, England, managed by Manchester University NHS Foundation Trust.

== History ==
=== Early history ===
Work began on what was originally named Davyhulme Park Hospital, established by the Barton-upon-Irwell Union, in 1926. The Barton-upon-Irwell Union had been established in keeping with the requirement of the Poor Law Amendment Act 1834 for parishes to create unions offering provision to the poor. The hospital opened to patients on 17 December 1928, officially opened by Princess Mary, Viscountess Lascelles on 1 June 1929. When opened the hospital could accommodate 500 patients. The electro-therapeutic and x-ray departments were well equipped. The building costs were less than those of existing similar hospitals; the costs for furniture and equipment much less than was usually the case at that time.

When the Local Government Act 1929 abolished the poor law unions, the hospital passed to Lancashire County Council.

During the Second World War it functioned initially as a British military hospital, the first patients arriving in 1940 as a result of the German invasion of Norway. Later the hospital was transferred to the US military becoming the 10th US Station Hospital where it hosted Glenn Miller and the United States Air Force Band to entertain the American troops. After the war it was de-requisitioned and returned to Lancashire County Council.

=== Postwar ===
The hospital is regarded as the first National Health Service hospital. Known as Park Hospital, it was visited by the then health minister Aneurin Bevan on 5 July 1948. In a symbolic ceremony, Aneurin Bevan received the keys from Lancashire County Council alongside a 'guard of honour' of nurses. Upon receiving the keys to the hospital Bevan was given a tour of the hospital by the Matron Ann Dolan. Dolan had been appointed as matron before the hospital had officially opened in 1929, and was pictured alongside Bevan and Diggory in the news stories of 1948.

Sylvia Diggory (née Beckingham), then 13, was the first NHS patient. She later recalled that "Mr Bevan asked me if I understood the significance of the occasion and told me that it was a milestone in history – the most civilised step any country had ever taken, and a day I would remember for the rest of my life – and of course, he was right."

The facility was renamed Trafford General Hospital in 1988. The maternity unit was closed in 2010 and the accident and emergency unit was closed in 2013 under instruction by health secretary Jeremy Hunt, despite a long campaign by interested parties. Emergency care provision was reduced to a nursing and GP service after emergency consultant care was withdrawn in 2016.

== See also ==
- Healthcare in Greater Manchester
- List of hospitals in England
