= Murder of Lesley Molseed =

1975 British murder

- Location: Turf Hill, Rochdale, Greater Manchester, England, UK
- Date: 5 October 1975
- Victim: Lesley Molseed
- Perpetrator: Ronald Castree
- Accused: Stefan Kiszko (wrongly convicted)
- Verdict: Guilty
- Convictions: Murder
- Convicted: 12 November 2007 (Castree); 21 July 1976 (Kiszko)
- Judge: Hugh Park (1976); Lord Lane (Lord Chief Justice), Mr Justice Rose and Mr Justice Potts (1992); Mr. Justice Openshaw (2007)
- Catherine Burke and Pamela Hind cautioned for perjury, Dick Holland and Ronald Outteridge charged with perverting the cause of justice, Kiszko conviction overturned in 1992

Lesley Molseed
- Born: Lesley Susan Anderson; 14 August 1964
- Disappeared: Turf Hill, Rochdale, Greater Manchester, England, UK
- Died: 5 October 1975 (aged 11); Near Rishworth Moor in West Yorkshire, England, UK
- Cause of death: Stab wounds
- Body discovered: 8 October 1975
- Other name: "Lel"

Lesley Susan Molseed (14 August 1964 – 5 October 1975) was an English schoolgirl who was abducted and murdered by Ronald Castree on 5 October 1975 in West Yorkshire. An intellectually disabled man who lived near Molseed's residence in Greater Manchester, Stefan Kiszko (/ˈkiːʃkoʊ/ KEESH-koh), was wrongly convicted of her murder and served sixteen years in prison before his conviction was overturned. His mental and physical health had deteriorated in prison, and he died twenty-two months after his release in February 1992. Kiszko's ordeal was described by one British MP as "the worst miscarriage of justice of all time."

Evidence exonerating Kiszko in the crime was suppressed by three members of the investigation team, who were initially arrested in 1993 before charges were dropped. In 2006, a DNA match led to Ronald Castree being charged with Molseed's murder; he was convicted the following year and sentenced to life imprisonment.

== Murder ==
Lesley Molseed was born on 14 August 1964 and lived with her family – mother April, stepfather Danny, and three siblings – at 11 Delamere Road, Rochdale, Greater Manchester, part of the Turf Hill council estate. Known as 'Lel' to her family, Lesley was born with a congenital condition that included cardiac complications. Despite open-heart surgery at age 3, Lesley was undersized and frail with a reduced mental capacity for her age.

On the early afternoon of Sunday 5 October 1975, Lesley was sent by her mother to a local shop on nearby Ansdell Road to buy bread and air-freshener. The Molseed children had a rota for chores and for Lesley, such an errand would have been routine (as it was for most school-aged children from urban/estate households in that era). Wearing a blue raincoat, carrying a blue canvas bag and £1 in cash, Lesley was last seen by witnesses in Stiups Lane, a pedestrian alleyway leading towards the shop. When she failed to return home, her concerned mother sent her siblings out to look for her. Her stepfather also joined the search but by 3:00 p.m., with no sign of her, and no evidence that she had arrived at the shops nor been encountered since, the parents contacted the police. A search around Rochdale and the adjacent M62 motorway was immediately begun.

Three days later, around 08:00 on 8 October, Lesley's body was found next to a remote section of the TransPennine railway near Rishworth Moor in West Yorkshire. Lying face down in tall grass on a natural turf shelf 30 ft (9 m) above the carriageway, she was discovered by a driver who had stopped in a nearby layby. Lesley had been stabbed twelve times in the upper shoulder and back: one wound had penetrated her heart. There were no defensive wounds, and a time of death could not be calculated. None of her clothing or possessions were disturbed, but her money was missing and semen was found on her clothing and underwear. Other evidence collected by forensics included foreign fibres, traces of dry wallpaper paste, and 379 other objects in the vicinity.

== Stefan Kiszko ==
Stefan Kiszko was a 23-year-old local tax clerk of Eastern European descent. His father, Iwan Kiszko, had emigrated from Soviet Ukraine and his mother, Charlotte (née Slavič), from Yugoslavia (modern-day Slovenia) after the Second World War, with both parents working in the cotton mills of Rochdale. In 1970, Kiszko's father died of a heart attack in front of his wife and son.

Kiszko came to the attention of the murder investigation when four girls — Maxine Buckley (aged 12), Catherine Burke (16), Debbie Brown (13), and Pamela Hind (18) — together claimed that he had indecently exposed himself to them the day before the murder. One claimed he had exposed himself to her a month after the murder, on Guy Fawkes Night. West Yorkshire Police quickly formed the view that Kiszko matched their idea of the likely killer, even though he had never been in trouble with the law and had no social life beyond his mother and aunt.

A psychological evaluation showed that Kiszko had the mental and emotional age of just twelve years. He had an unusual hobby of writing down registration numbers of cars that annoyed him, which supported police suspicions. Investigators now pursued evidence which might incriminate him, and ignored other leads that might have taken them in other directions.

Acting upon the teenage girls' information and their suspicions of Kiszko's idiosyncratic lifestyle – and having allegedly found girlie magazines and a bag of sweets in his car – police arrested him on 21 December 1975. During questioning, the interviewing detectives seized upon every apparent inconsistency between his varying accounts of the relevant days as further demonstration of his likely guilt. Kiszko confessed to the crime after three days of intensive questioning: he believed that by doing so, he would be allowed to go home and that the ensuing investigations would prove him innocent and his confession false. Prior to the Police and Criminal Evidence Act of 1984, suspects did not have the right to have a solicitor present during interviews and the police did not ask Kiszko if he wanted one. His request to have his mother present while he was being questioned was refused and, crucially, the police did not caution him until long after they had decided he was the prime suspect – indeed, the only suspect.

After admitting to the murder to police, Kiszko was charged with Lesley's murder on Christmas Eve 1975. When he entered Armley Gaol after being charged, he was nicknamed "Oliver Laurel" because he had the girth of Oliver Hardy and the perplexed air of Oliver's comedy sidekick Stan Laurel. Later, in the presence of a solicitor, Kiszko retracted his confession. He was remanded until his murder trial, which began on 7 July 1976 under Mr Justice Park at Leeds Crown Court. He was defended by David Waddington QC, who later became Home Secretary. The prosecuting QC, Peter Taylor, became Lord Chief Justice the day after Kiszko was cleared of the murder in 1992.

=== Trial and appeal ===
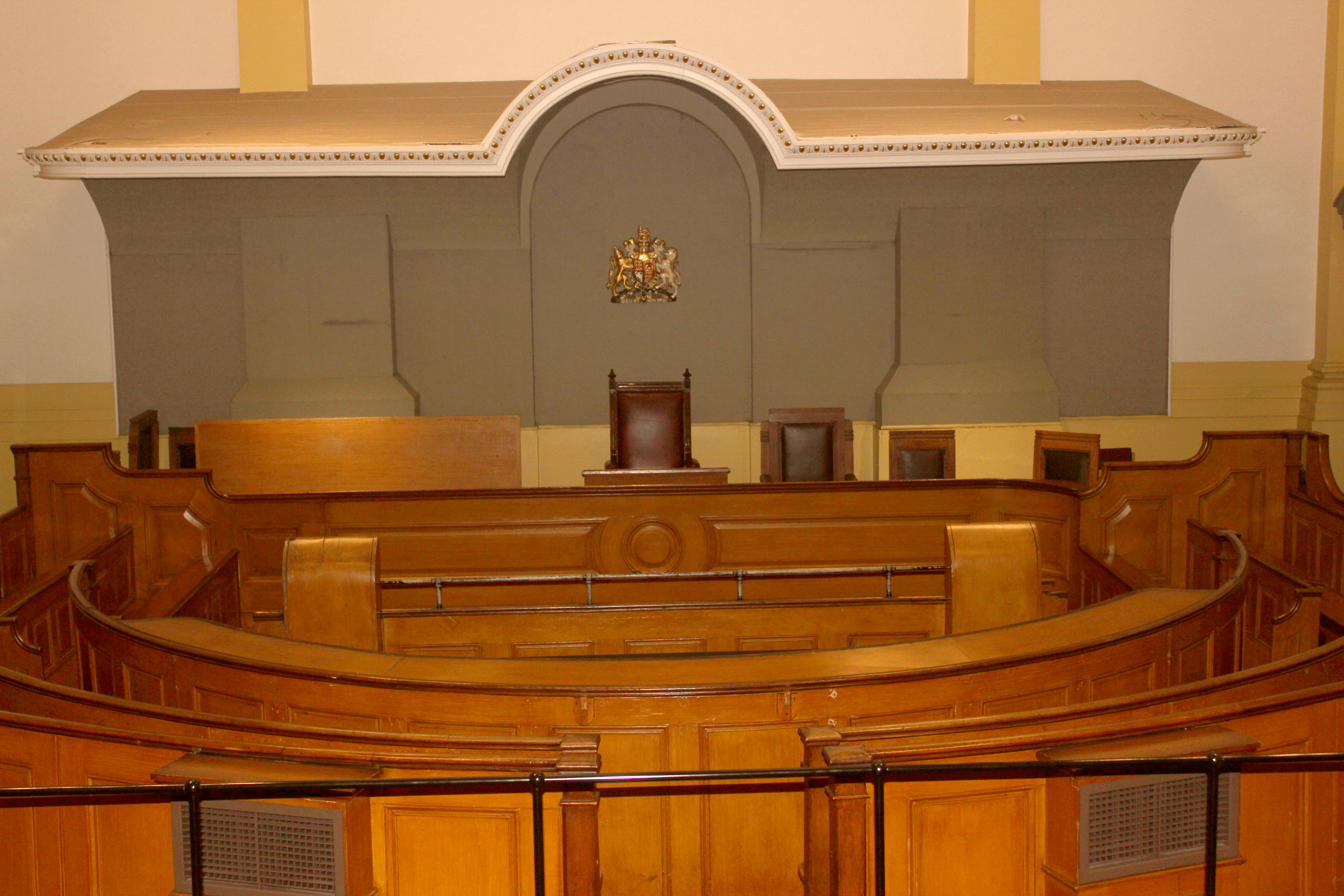
Kiszko was tried at Leeds Assizes then seated at Leeds Town Hall (courtroom pictured)

Kiszko's defence team, led by Waddington, made significant mistakes. First, they did not seek an adjournment when the Crown delivered thousands of pages of additional unused material on the first morning of the trial. Then there was the inconsistent defence of diminished responsibility which Kiszko never authorised, on the grounds that the testosterone he was receiving for his hypogonadism might have made him behave unusually. Kiszko's endocrinologist strongly disagreed with this theory, and if called to testify would have said that his treatment could not have caused him to act in such a way that would make him carry out a murder. He was never called.

The manslaughter claim undermined Kiszko's claims that he was totally innocent and destroyed his alibis (a defence known in legal parlance as "riding two horses"). In fact, his innocence could have been demonstrated at the trial. The pathologist who examined the victim's clothes found traces of sperm, whereas the sample taken from Kiszko by the police contained no sperm. There was medical evidence that Kiszko had broken his ankle some months before the murder and, in view of that and his being overweight, he would have found it difficult to scale the slope to the murder spot. The sperm findings were suppressed by the police and never disclosed to the defence team or the jury; neither was the medical evidence of his broken ankle disclosed to the court.

Kiszko gave evidence that, in July 1975, he had become ill and was admitted to Birch Hill Hospital, where he was given a blood transfusion. In August, he was transferred to a Manchester hospital and diagnosed as anaemic along with what he understood was a "hormone deficiency" (which was in fact Klinefelter syndrome). Kiszko agreed to injections to rectify the latter problem and was discharged in September. He said correctly that he had never met Lesley and therefore could not have murdered her, and he claimed he was tending to his father's grave with his aunt at the time of the murder, before visiting a garden centre and then going home. When asked why he had confessed, Kiszko replied, "I started to tell these lies and they seemed to please them and the pressure was off as far as I was concerned. I thought if I admitted what I did to the police they would check out what I had said, find it untrue and would then let me go."

Kiszko's conviction was secured by a 10–2 majority verdict on 21 July 1976 after five hours and thirty-five minutes of deliberation. He was given a life sentence for committing Lesley's murder. The judge praised the three teenage girls who had made the exposure claims, Buckley in particular, for their "bravery and honesty" in giving evidence in court and their "sharp observations". The evidence given by Hind was read out in court. Park said that Buckley's "[s]harp eyes set this train of inquiry into motion". He also praised the police officers involved in the case "for their great skill in bringing to justice the person responsible for this dreadful crime and their expertise in sifting through masses of material", adding, "I would like all the officers responsible for the result to be specially commended and these observations conveyed to the Chief Constable." DS John Akeroyd and DS Holland were singled out for praise.

Sheila Buckley, whose daughter Maxine played a major part in securing Kiszko's conviction, criticised the police for not arresting Kiszko earlier and told the Manchester Evening News that "My daughter had a nightmare life until this monster was arrested. He frightened several local girls in his campaign of terror." Even Albert Wright, Kiszko's solicitor, thought that his client was guilty but that it was a case of diminished responsibility and that he should not have been convicted of murder.

After a month in Armley Gaol, Kiszko was transferred to Wakefield Prison and immediately placed on Rule 43, a segregation policy to protect prisoners from other inmates, as in the eyes of the law, he was now a convicted sex offender. Kiszko launched an appeal, but it was dismissed on 25 May 1978 when Lord Justice Bridge said "We can find no grounds whatsoever to condemn the jury's verdict of murder as in any way unsafe or unsatisfactory. The appeal is dismissed."

== Time in prison ==
=== Attacks ===
After his conviction, Kiszko was hated by most inmates, receiving multiple taunts and death threats in the first months after his conviction. He was physically attacked on four occasions. The first was on 24 August 1976, one day after being transferred to Wakefield Prison, when he was set upon in his cell by five prisoners who stole his watch, smashed up his radio, cut his mouth and injured both his knee and ankle. The attackers said they did it for Lesley and her family. On 11 May 1977, he was hit over the head with a mop handle, leaving Kiszko in need of 17 stitches to a head wound. In December 1978, he was punched once in the face by a prisoner in an unprovoked attack while in the prison chapel.

In March 1981, Kiszko was again punched in the face by a prisoner in an unprovoked attack while in the prison yard, but this time Kiszko retaliated. Blows were exchanged and the two had to be separated by guards. Both men were given a loss of privileges for 28 days. On each occasion, the attacks on Kiszko earned him no sympathy from prisoners or guards because of the crime for which he had been jailed.

=== Mental illness ===
In July 1979, the Inland Revenue finally wrote to Kiszko to inform him he had been sacked. From late 1979 onwards, he developed signs of schizophrenia and began to have delusions, one for example being that he was the victim of a plot to incarcerate an innocent tax office employee so the effects of imprisonment would be tested on him. In January 1980, he said that coded messages on BBC Radio 2's Jimmy Young Show were being sent to him. In 1982, he claimed that his parents had a tape recorder hidden in the kitchen and made him sing after turning it on, later selling the songs to Barry Manilow to make money out of his talent. Throughout the 1980s, Kiszko's claims of innocence were either labelled as symptoms of his schizophrenic delusions or attributed to his being in a state of denial. One forensic psychiatrist made a note of Kiszko having "delusions of innocence".

=== Remaining years in prison ===
In October 1981, Kiszko was put in the punishment block for possessing scissors in his cell. On 11 November, he was transferred to Gloucester Prison. In April 1983, he was informed that eligibility for parole required an admission of guilt: if he continued to deny murdering Lesley, he would spend the rest of his life behind bars. This made no difference to Kiszko's stance. Thirteen months later, still denying having carried out the murder, he was moved to Bristol Prison. His mental deterioration was such that in June 1984, a forensic psychiatrist recommended his transfer to a high-security psychiatric hospital. Nothing came of it. Six months later, Kiszko was returned to Wakefield Prison.

In August 1987, Kiszko was transferred to the specialist Category B Grendon Prison where, in June 1988, the prison governor tried to persuade him to enrol on a sex offenders' treatment programme. This would require him to admit he murdered Lesley, followed by an exploration of his motives and behaviours. Kiszko refused to take part, persistently "refusing to address his offending behaviour" on the grounds that he had done nothing that needed addressing. Having been classed as making "no progress" he was returned to Wakefield Prison in May 1989.

In February 1990, the Home Office privately disclosed that Kiszko's first parole hearing would take place in December 1992, by which time he would have served seventeen years in custody. However, he would be released only if he admitted to having murdered Lesley, discuss what led him to murdering her, and if he could convince the Parole Board that he would not be a danger to children or the public.

It was now more than a decade since Kiszko had developed signs of mental illness and six years since it was recommended he be sent for psychiatric hospital treatment. His health continued to deteriorate; in July 1990, he said he was striking out a ghost who was trying to sexually abuse him. After a further eight months of delays, in March 1991 Kiszko was transferred to Ashworth Hospital under Section 47 of the Mental Health Act 1983.

== Case reopened ==
Kiszko's mother continued to profess her son's innocence, but was ignored and stonewalled both by politicians, including her local MP Cyril Smith and Prime Ministers James Callaghan (from 1976 to 1979) and Margaret Thatcher (from 1979 to 1990), and by the legal system. In 1984 she contacted JUSTICE, the UK human rights organisation which at the time investigated many miscarriages of justice. Three years later, she was put in touch with solicitor Campbell Malone, who agreed to take a look at the case.

Malone consulted Philip Clegg, who had been Waddington's junior at the July 1976 trial. Clegg had expressed his own doubts about the confession and conviction at the time, and over the next two years he and Malone prepared a petition to the Home Secretary. The draft was finally ready to be sent on 26 October 1989. On the same day, by coincidence, Waddington was appointed Home Secretary. Sixteen months passed before a police investigation into the conduct of the original trial could begin. Waddington resigned as Home Secretary in November 1990 to take up a peerage and to serve as Leader of the House of Lords; he was replaced by Kenneth Baker.

In February 1991, and with the help of a private detective named Peter Jackson, Malone finally convinced the Home Office to reopen the case, which was then referred back to West Yorkshire Police. Detective Superintendent Trevor Wilkinson was assigned to the job. He immediately found several glaring errors. Kiszko's innocence was demonstrated conclusively through medical evidence; he had male hypogonadism, which rendered him infertile, contradicting forensic evidence obtained at the time of the murder. In 1975, his testes had measured 4 to 5 mm, whereas the average adult testicular size was 15 to 20 mm. During his research, Jackson found someone who confirmed that Kiszko had been seen with his aunt tending his father's grave on the day the murder took place. They said they could not understand why they had not been called to give evidence at the trial. Someone else said that Kiszko had been in a shop around the time of the murder.

Also that month, the four girls — now aged 27, 28, 31 and 33 — who were involved in the trial admitted that the evidence they had given which had led to Kiszko's arrest and conviction was false, and that they had lied for "a laugh" and because "at the time it was funny". Burke was interviewed at Sowerby police station on 14 February 1991. She said she wished she had not said anything, saying she did not think it would go as far as it did and that she went along with what Hind had said. Buckley said it was not Kiszko who had exposed himself to her, but she had seen a taxi driver (not Ronald Castree) urinating behind a bush on the day of the murder; she also refused to apologise. Brown refused to make any statement. Hind was a friend of Lesley's older sister but was the most remorseful of the four, saying that what they did was "foolish – but we were young" and that, had she appeared in court, she would have told the truth about Kiszko – unlike her three friends, who all had committed perjury. Hind did not think Kiszko would be convicted. A decision was made by the prosecuting authorities for a senior police officer to caution Hind and Burke for the criminal offence that each had undoubtedly committed.

=== Acquittal ===
In May 1991, Kenneth Baker ordered Kiszko's case to go to the Court of Appeal. On 19 December 1991 Kiszko was bailed to Prestwich Hospital.

Ten months before his parole hearing was due, on 17 February 1992, the judicial investigation into Kiszko's conviction began. It was heard by three judges, Lord Lane (Lord Chief Justice), Mr Justice Rose and Mr Justice Potts. Present at the hearing were Franz Muller QC and William Boyce QC for the Crown, who were there to argue that Kiszko was guilty of murder and therefore must remain in prison custody for at least another ten months; and Stephen Sedley QC and Jim Gregory, to state that Kiszko was innocent.

After hearing the new evidence presented by Sedley, who said the original verdict "could not in all probability have been obtained if new medical evidence had been before the court at the time of the trial", Gregory, Muller and Boyce did not put up any contrary argument and immediately accepted its validity. Also, after hearing the new evidence, Lord Lane said: "It has been shown that this man cannot produce sperm. This man cannot have been the person responsible for ejaculating over the girl's knickers and skirt, and consequently cannot have been the murderer." Kiszko was cleared, and Lord Lane ordered his immediate release from custody.

The 1976 trial judge Sir Hugh Park, who had praised the police and the 13-year-old girls at the original trial for bringing Kiszko to justice, apologised for what had happened to Kiszko but said he was not sorry for how he had handled the court case. He wrote to Kiszko to express regret that he had been convicted for something he had not done. Anthony Beaumont-Dark, a Conservative MP, said, "This must be the worst miscarriage of justice of all time. It brings shame on everyone involved in the case." He then demanded a full, independent and wide-ranging inquiry into the conviction.

The Molseed family publicly apologised for the things they had said after his conviction, such as demanding that he be hanged in public. Lesley's older sister Julie Crabbe said when Kiszko was cleared: "How could anyone feel about this innocent man who has spent sixteen years in prison, and they were not very nice to him in prison. At least his mum knows that he will come home. Our Lesley will never come home again."

Kiszko's mother said that it was Waddington who ought to be "strung up" for his pro-capital punishment views and for the way he had handled her son's defence at the 1976 trial. Neither, Lord Lane, the then Lord Chief Justice, the four girls, Ronald Outteridge and the prosecution barrister Peter Taylor offered any apology, nor did any of them express any words of remorse or even simple regret for what had happened. Even the West Yorkshire Police, while accepting and admitting they had been wrong, tried to justify the position they had taken in 1975. Waddington said that if the evidence had been available in July 1976, the trial would have taken "a very different course".

Dick Holland, the surviving senior officer in charge of the original investigation, said: "Words can't express the regret I feel for the family and for Kiszko, now [that] it has turned out he is innocent. But the enquiry was done diligently and honestly within the terms that were legally and scientifically available. After Kiszko's arrest, the forensic science service received a hanky which may have had seminal stainings from Kiszko. After his arrest, he produced a sample in the presence of his solicitor and doctor which was sent to the laboratory for comparison. Now how much further can you go?"

On 2 March 1992, Edward Tierney, who ordered the sperm tests that led to the freeing of Kiszko, was dismissed after 25 years because he had demanded that police surgeons should be independent of the police and Crown Prosecution Service.

=== Release and death ===
Kiszko needed further psychiatric treatment for another month and remained in Prestwich Hospital after his acquittal. He was fully released in March 1992 but the sixteen years of incarceration for something he had not done had both mentally and emotionally destroyed him. Kiszko became a virtual recluse and showed little interest in anything or anyone. He bought a new car (a silver Ford Sierra) and drove it on short journeys to the shops, Morrisons or garden centres, or to visit relatives, but other people's apologies for what had happened, encouragement and support seemed to frighten him. As his mental health had deteriorated over the years, so now did his physical health; in October 1993, Kiszko was diagnosed with angina.

Kiszko died at 1:00 a.m. on 23 December that year, after a heart attack at his home, eighteen years and two days after he made the confession that helped lead to his wrongful conviction for murder. He was pronounced dead on arrival at Rochdale Infirmary. Lesley's eldest sister Julie attended his funeral, held on 5 January 1994. Four months after her son's death, on 3 May, Charlotte Kiszko died at Birch Hill Hospital, Rochdale, at the age of 70. The graves of the Kiszko family are together in Rochdale Cemetery.

After being released from prison, Kiszko had been told he would receive £500,000 in compensation for the years spent in prison. He had received an interim payment but neither he nor his mother received the full amount awarded.

In 1994, Detective Superintendent Dick Holland (the surviving senior officer in charge of the original investigation) and Ronald Outteridge (the senior forensic scientist on the case) were charged with "doing acts tending to pervert the course of justice" by allegedly suppressing evidence in Kiszko's favour, namely the results of scientific tests on semen taken from the victim's body and from the accused. On May Day 1995, the case was challenged at a committal hearing as an abuse of process and that charges should be stayed as passage of time would make a fair trial impossible. The presiding magistrate agreed and the case was never sent for trial by jury. Holland subsequently attained public prominence as the second-in-command of George Oldfield on the flawed investigation into the Yorkshire Ripper but was sidelined during the late stage of the investigation and moved back into uniform to a desk job during the subsequent inquiry into WYP's failings. He retired in 1988, at a time when he viewed the conviction of both Kiszko and of Judith Ward (whose conviction was overturned by the High Court in May 1992) as being among his "finest hours" during his 35 years in the police force. He died in February 2007 at the age of 74.

== Ronald Castree ==
In October 1985, to mark the 10th anniversary of Lesley Molseed's murder, with the case being closed and the police and the Molseed family firmly believing that the killer was long behind bars, Lesley's clothes – which were taken from the crime scene – were destroyed but strips of adhesive tape had been kept; these had been used to remove fibres from the inside and outside of Lesley's semen-stained knickers. Scientists from the Forensic Science Service's lab in Wetherby managed to extract sperm heads from this tape. And from these sperm heads, in 1999, for the first time ever, a DNA profile of the man who killed Lesley and ejaculated into her knickers was obtained, but he was not in the national DNA Database.

On 5 November 2006, it was announced that a 53-year-old man had been arrested in connection with the murder of Molseed that had taken place in 1975. DNA evidence was alleged to have shown a "direct hit" with a sample found at the scene of the murder. Ronald Castree (born 18 October 1953 in Littleborough, near Rochdale), a Shaw and Crompton comic book dealer, was charged with murder and made his first court appearance on 7 November 2006, where he was remanded in custody. At a court hearing on 19 April 2007, Castree pleaded not guilty. On 23 April 2007 he was refused bail. A DNA sample from Castree, taken on 1 October 2005 when he was arrested but not charged in connection with another sex attack, was a direct match with a semen sample found on Lesley's knickers, when run through the national DNA Database.

Originally from the Turf Hill estate of Rochdale, Castree lived in nearby Shaw and Crompton and was a taxi driver for many years. He was unpopular with his neighbours, who said he had a "very nasty temper". His former wife said "he was foul with his mouth, and foul with his fists". Two weeks before Castree killed Lesley, his wife had given birth to a son. Castree was not the baby's biological father; his wife had had an affair. On 3 October 1975, Castree's wife went back into hospital with deep vein thrombosis, leaving Castree home alone on the day of the murder. She remained there for the following week. The birth of the illegitimate child may have been a trigger for Castree's murder of Lesley. Castree and his wife had two more children together, but they split in 1996 and divorced a year later.

On 3 July 1976, Castree abducted and sexually assaulted a nine-year-old girl. On 12 July, he pleaded guilty and was fined £25 on both counts against him, which were indecent assault and incitement to commit an act of gross indecency. On 17 July 1978, Castree was fined £50 after indecently assaulting a seven-year-old boy.

=== Trial and conviction ===
Castree's trial began at Bradford Crown Court on 22 October 2007. During the trial, a scientist told a jury how DNA taken from Lesley's knickers was linked to Castree. Forensic expert Gemma Escott explained to Bradford Crown Court the chances of the semen samples belonging to anyone other than Castree were one in a billion. Castree was found guilty on 12 November 2007. He was sentenced to life imprisonment with a minimum term of thirty years, which is expected to keep him in prison until at least November 2036 and the age of 83.

== Media ==
A television film adaptation of Kiszko's story was made and broadcast by ITV on 4 October 1998; A Life for a Life was directed by Stephen Whittaker, and featured Tony Maudsley as Kiszko and Olympia Dukakis as his mother Charlotte. A documentary about the case, Real Crime: The 30 Year Secret, was broadcast by ITV1 on 29 September 2008. In the Channel 4 television series Red Riding, the character of Michael Myshkin is based on Kiszko, being a simple-minded immigrant who is coerced into confessing the rape and murder of an 11-year-old girl. The animated comedy series Monkey Dust (2003–05) featured a character named Ivan Dobsky, a simple-minded immigrant convicted of several grisly murders, in a parody of Kiszko.

In February 2003, a television appeal for new information was made by Detective Chief Superintendent Max McLean of West Yorkshire Police on the BBC One programme Crimewatch, publicly announcing the existence of a DNA profile of the killer for the first time, but no new leads were forthcoming. As revealed in the ITV television documentary Real Crime: The 30 Year Secret, Castree was convicted in 1976 of gross indecency and indecent assault against a nine-year-old girl in Rochdale; he was fined £25 (equivalent to £168 in 2025).

In May 2018, the crime and the convictions were covered in a two-part series by Casefile True Crime Podcast.

== See also ==
- List of miscarriage of justice cases
- Murder of Teresa de Simone
- Murder of Linda Cook
- Murder of Wendy Sewell
- Murder of Carol Wilkinson
- Murder of Jacqueline Thomas
- Innocent prisoner's dilemma
- Joe Arridy

Still-unsolved UK cold cases in which the offender's DNA is known:

- Murder of Deborah Linsley
- Murders of Eve Stratford and Lynne Weedon
- Murders of Jacqueline Ansell-Lamb and Barbara Mayo
- Murder of Lindsay Rimer
- Murder of Lyn Bryant
- Murder of Janet Brown
- Murder of Julie Pacey
- Murder of Melanie Hall
- Batman rapist, subject of Britain's longest-running serial rape investigation
