= Healthcare in Greater Manchester =

The "Greater Manchester Model" of NHS health care was a system uniquely devolved within England, by way of close integration with the Greater Manchester Combined Authority and local authorities, led by the Mayor of Greater Manchester. In July 2022 the Greater Manchester integrated care system took over responsibility for health and social care in the conurbation. The financial plan for 2022–23 had an initial shortage of £187 million.

== Geography ==
The Tameside CCG included Glossop which was not, as far as local government is concerned, in Greater Manchester, but has been part of the Manchester health economy since 1947. The decision made in July 2015 about acute surgery in Greater Manchester taken by the 12 CCGs with the support of the 10 local authorities was explicitly determined by the interests of patients in High Peak.

== Primary and community care ==
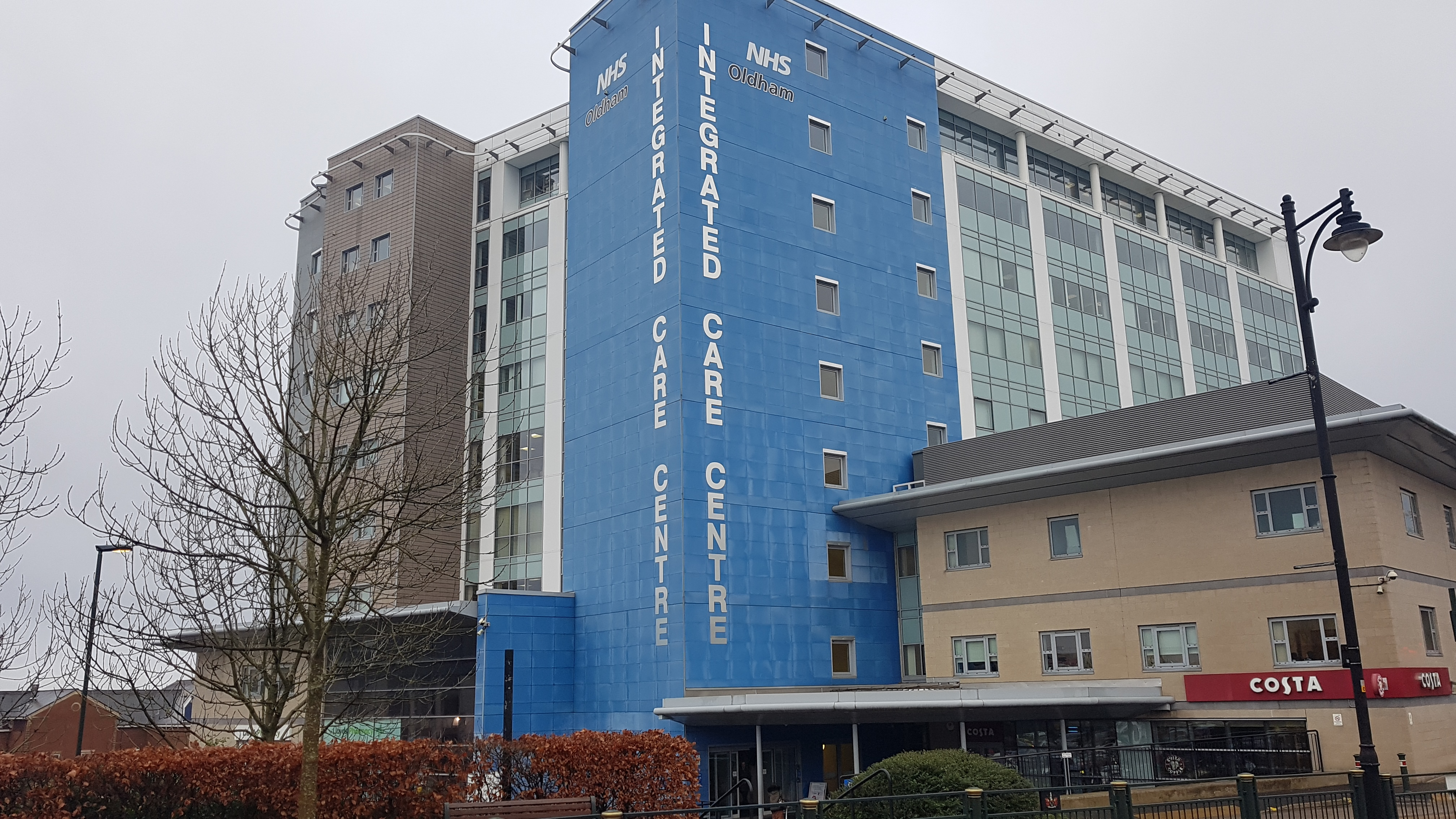
Oldham Integrated Care Centre

There were 486 general practices in Greater Manchester in 2018. About 3 million patients are registered. Hope Citadel Healthcare in Oldham was found to be outstanding by the Care Quality Commission in 2016. There are more than 700 community pharmacies.

Out-of-hours services are provided by GO To DOC in Manchester, Tameside and Oldham, Salford Royal NHS Foundation Trust in Salford, Bardoc in Bury, Bolton and Rochdale, Mastercall in Stockport, and Trafford and Bridgewater Community Healthcare NHS Foundation Trust in Wigan.

Community care is provided by the hospital trusts in Manchester, and Tameside Bridgewater Community Healthcare NHS Foundation Trust.

Hospice care is provided by St Ann's Hospice.

A programme which provided more than 50,000 extra GP appointments in central Manchester, Bury and Heywood and Middleton in 2014 brought a 3% reduction in accident and emergency activity, and is to be rolled out across the conurbation. An investment of £41 million over 4 years was announced in February 2017 which promised access to a GP seven days a week across the conurbation.

== Healthwatch ==
Healthwatch was set up under the Health and Social Care Act 2012 to act as a voice for patients. There is a Healthwatch for each of the ten boroughs.

== Mental health ==
J Lancelot Burn was appointed Medical Officer of Health for Salford in 1941. Mental health was one of his priorities and he was unusual in his view that the community, rather than an institution, was the natural care environment. He developed community resources including a therapeutic social club, a women's day centre and collaboration with the University of Manchester's Department of Social and Preventive Medicine. He appointed Mervyn Susser to be head of Salford City Council's mental health department in 1957. Susser organised Mental Welfare Officers around GP practices so that each GP had a known officer and sent copies of patients' progress reports to their GP. He appointed Hugh Freeman as a consultant psychiatrist with responsibilities across general and mental hospitals, out-patient clinics, and local authority services in 1961. By 1968 Salford was recognized for 'excellent programmes' distinguished by their being driven by the local authority rather than the hospital.

NHS mental health and learning disability services in the county are now provided by Pennine Care NHS Foundation Trust and Greater Manchester Mental Health NHS Foundation Trust. Mental health patients from Manchester were transferred to private clinics, many in remote locations, more than 670 times between 2013 and 2015. Manchester Mental Health and Social Care Trust paid more than £7 million to private providers over this period.

Between 2010 and 2015 there was a 5.9% cut in the number of mental health beds from 1,491 to 1,403. During the same period, the number of people admitted by the three mental health trusts in the conurbation has increased by 23% from 8,327 to 10,246.

== Hospital and acute care ==
NHS hospital services are provided by Bolton NHS Foundation Trust, Manchester University NHS Foundation Trust, The Christie NHS Foundation Trust, Pennine Acute Hospitals NHS Trust, Salford Royal NHS Foundation Trust, Stockport NHS Foundation Trust, Tameside and Glossop Integrated Care NHS Foundation Trust, and Wrightington, Wigan and Leigh NHS Foundation Trust.

From April 2015 all new onset suspected stroke cases in the conurbation will be treated at one of three specialist "hyperacute centres" at Salford Royal NHS Foundation Trust, Pennine Acute Hospitals NHS Trust or Stockport NHS Foundation Trust where patients can get access to emergency "clot busting" thrombolysis and immediate brain scans. District stroke units at other hospitals will remain open but their focus will be shifted to patient rehabilitation and recovery. It is hoped this move could save 50 lives a year.

Following a prolonged consultation process called "Healthier Together" it was agreed in July 2015 that Stepping Hill Hospital, Manchester Royal Infirmary, Salford Royal Hospital and Royal Oldham Hospital would be the "specialists" in emergency and high risk general surgery. This decision was challenged by consultants at University Hospital of South Manchester NHS Foundation Trust who launched a campaign under the banner "Keep Wythenshawe Special" and an unsuccessful action for judicial review, claiming the decision was unlawfully based on the impact on travel times for patients outside Greater Manchester. In 2021 the planned consolidation of high-risk general surgery was dropped, which was said to be "extraordinary considering the work that went into all the planning, public consultation and judicial review.

Every acute trust in Greater Manchester apart from Bolton announced that they expected a deficit at March 2016, a total £114m deficit.

In January 2016 Sir Jonathan Michael was appointed to provide independent oversight of plans for a "single hospital service" in Manchester which is intended to bring together Central Manchester University Hospitals NHS Foundation Trust, University Hospital of South Manchester NHS Foundation Trust and North Manchester General Hospital (at that time part of Pennine Acute Hospitals NHS Trust) to provide single clinical services across the City of Manchester. The first step in the programme was the creation of Manchester University NHS Foundation Trust on 1 October 2017, formed by merging the Central Manchester and South Manchester trusts. The programme was completed on 1 April 2021 when North Manchester General Hospital formally joined the trust.

Northern Care Alliance NHS Group was formed in 2017 after the CQC asked Salford Royal Foundation Trust to take over leadership of the Pennine Acute Hospitals NHS Trust following an "inadequate" rating during inspection in March 2016. The group runs Salford Royal, Oldham General, Rochdale Infirmary and Fairfield General Hospital, and previously temporairily managed North Manchester General Hospital until April 2020 and its merger with Manchester University NHS Foundation Trust.

The eight hospital trusts worked with Sectra AB to set up a common Picture Archiving and Communication System to handle X-rays, CT scans, ultrasound, MRI scans, and an extensive range of other diagnostic images and make them available on all their sites in 2020.

The Greater Manchester Urgent Primary Care Alliance started using Odyssey, a clinical decision support solution from software provider, Advanced, in 2020. This enables patients to be triaged by telephone before they visit any A&E department in Greater Manchester. Less-urgent patients can be directed to more-appropriate services such as their GP practice, out-of-hours centres, mental health services, or self care. Those who are triaged to A&E are offered a timed appointment.

== History ==
The Manchester Joint Hospitals Advisory Board was created in 1935 and reconstituted as the Manchester, Salford, and Stretford Joint Hospitals Advisory Board in 1942. It included representatives of the Public Health Committee, the Hospital Council, Manchester University and the Medical Officer of Health. Harry Platt pioneered the development of Orthopedic surgery in Manchester in the 1930s and the joint board built a new orthopaedic block at Manchester Royal Infirmary in 1936 which was seen as a national example for effective coordination between the voluntary and statutory sectors.

The North West Emergency Medical Service was run on a regional basis, which was not the case in other areas.

From 1947 to 1974 NHS services in Greater Manchester (which did not then exist) were managed by the Manchester Regional Hospital Board, which also covered the boroughs of Buxton and Glossop and the urban districts of New Mills and Whaley Bridge. The first chair of the Board was Sir John Stopford, then Vice Chancellor of Manchester University. In 1974 the Boards were abolished and replaced by regional health authorities. The whole of the newly created Greater Manchester (and Glossop) came under the North Western RHA. Regions were reorganised in 1996 and Greater Manchester came under the North West Regional Health Authority. Greater Manchester from 1974 had 12 district health authorities, one for each of the smaller boroughs and three (North, South and Central) covering Manchester itself. The district health authorities took over responsibility for many of the health services previously managed by local authorities including vaccination, health centres, family planning, school health, health visiting and home nursing. In 1994 four new district health authorities were established covering Bury and Rochdale, Manchester, West Pennine, Salford and Trafford, while Wigan was unchanged. 12 primary care trusts were established covering the whole of the county in 2002: Ashton, Leigh and Wigan; Bolton; Bury; Heywood, Middleton and Rochdale; Manchester North, South and Central; Oldham; Salford; Stockport; Tameside and Glossop; Trafford. They were managed by the Greater Manchester Strategic Health Authority until 2006 and then by the North West SHA from 2002 until 2013.

=== Commissioning ===
In 2015, ten clinical commissioning groups (CCGs) – one for each of Greater Manchester's metropolitan boroughs – organised the delivery of NHS services within Greater Manchester. The chief executive of the corresponding local authorities took over the CCG accountable officer role on a phased dual basis, forming a "single commissioning function" integrated with local government. The CCGs took on the responsibilities of the former PCTs on 1 April 2013. The three clinical commissioning groups for Manchester decided in September 2016 that they would merge in April 2017.

The North West Commissioning support unit's work was transferred to Greater Manchester Shared Services, hosted by Oldham Clinical Commissioning Group in 2016.

Greater Manchester was one of the four areas chosen to trial the integration of specialised commissioning, previously run by NHS England centrally, in September 2016. In 2017 Trafford, Wigan, Rochdale and Oldham agreed to effective mergers with the council's social care departments. Although they will still exist as statutory bodies the council chief executives will take over the CCG accountable officer role. This has already happened in Tameside. Manchester Health and Care Commissioning has been established through a partnership agreement between Manchester City Council and the CCG, although it has its own accountable officer.

== Devo Manc ==
In May 2018 Jon Rouse announced that there would be a review of hospital specialities across the region which would lead to proposal for reconfiguration in paediatrics, respiratory, cardiology, orthopaedics, breast services, neuro-rehabilitation, benign urology, critical care and anaesthetics, and vascular services.

=== Initial arrangements ===
In February 2015 it was announced by George Osborne, the Chancellor of the Exchequer, that the conurbation was to be given more control over the NHS budget of around £6 billion per annum. A Memorandum of Understanding was signed by NHS England, 12 NHS clinical commissioning groups, 15 NHS providers and 10 local authorities and countersigned by Osborne and Jeremy Hunt. It builds on the work of the Greater Manchester Combined Authority which was agreed in November 2014 by the leaders of the 10 local authorities and which will lead to the election of a Mayor for Greater Manchester. There will be a new health and social care chief executive who will be accountable for the £6bn devolved health and care budget. A health and social care partnership board will be responsible for "shaping the strategic direction" of services in the region from April 2016. There will be a joint commissioning board consisting of representatives from the councils, CCGs and NHS England which will make "decisions about where funds go".

Norman Warner called the project "Healthopolis" and describes two great strengths: "First, it resolves the fragmentation of leadership, commissioning and service delivery that undermines most modern health and social care systems. Second, it aligns NHS and social care with other resources that build wellbeing, such as housing, transport and job support, all at the same devolved level." He has been told that 20% of the local population will be offered unprecedented one-to-one, intensive primary and community care, using all available tools, to eliminate at least 60,000 acute hospital admissions a year. The conurbation was facing a recurring health and social care budget deficit of £500m a year by 2017–18 and it is hoped that this approach will halve the problem.

=== Evaluation ===
Manchester University published a report on developments in 2018, which they described as "soft devolution" because, unlike most devolution reforms, there is no statutory basis, just agreements for administrative delegation. There are no substantial differences between the policies followed locally and national policies, but there is more control over implementation than in other areas. Although the Greater Manchester Partnership behaves in some ways like a strategic health authority it actually has little formal power over NHS bodies and none over local authorities. Positive relationships have been established, but they have not been tested. They agree that more co-ordination may improve care, but they doubt if it will save money.

The Centre for Policy Studies produced a report in 2021 arguing that there were no obvious benefits of the devolution and integration, and stressing the 65% increase in delayed transfers of care as a benchmark for whether health and social care systems are working properly together.

In 2022 an analysis of the effect of devolution on health by Manchester University concluded that the conurbation had better life expectancy than expected after devolution. "The benefits of devolution were apparent in the areas with the highest income deprivation and lowest life expectancy, suggesting a narrowing of inequalities".

=== Interim arrangements ===
In April 2015 Ian Williamson, Chief Executive of Central Manchester Clinical Commissioning Group was appointed interim chief officer for the project. £2 million will be spent developing the project in 2015/6. Plans include ensuring that a GP made available in the local area for every Greater Manchester resident on Sunday.

In July 2015 a Memorandum of Understanding was signed between Council leaders, Public Health England, NHS England and local NHS organisations to create a single public health leadership for the whole of the conurbation, with a pooled budget.

Salford is one of the areas selected to pilot Integrated primary and acute care systems, and Stockport to pilot Multispecialty community providers, under the Five Year Forward View.

Mark Hutchinson, Chief Information Officer of University Hospital of South Manchester NHS Foundation Trust is leading the development of a system which will make available an integrated record of key information to clinicians across the conurbation using Graphnet's CareCentric Patient Portal.

In November 2015 it was reported that 'radical scaling up' of shared services between NHS trusts across the conurbation such as diagnostics, back office support and pathology was envisaged in order to save money.

A transformation fund of £450 million has been allocated by NHS England to the project for the period 2015–20. This is said to be the conurbation's fair share of the national transformation budget. It will not be used to cover NHS trusts deficits but will be used for double running costs.

=== Operational arrangements ===
In February 2016 it was reported that the Chief Officer (Jon Rouse) for NHS in Greater Manchester, who was soon to be appointed to the Greater Manchester Health and Social Care Partnership would be responsible for:

- Half the specialised services budget, previously managed by NHS England
- The public health budgets previously managed by NHS England
- Dental care, pharmacy services and primary optical services
- The running costs of NHS England as far as they relate to the conurbation
- The transformation funds

In March 2016 Howard Bernstein was appointed the leader of the Greater Manchester Sustainability and transformation plan footprint.

In 2016-17 the region reported an overall surplus of £237 million, which was regarded as significantly better than the average in the English NHS.

Jon Rouse resigned in November 2019.

=== Technology ===
The Manchester CCGs and the City Council set up a shared Care Record scheme in 2015. From April 2015 it is to incorporate an Electronic Palliative Care and Coordination System which will be available to the 90 GP practices in the city. It captures a patient’ wishes and key information in the last years of life, such as do not resuscitate orders. A Bolton Care Record was launched in September 2017, although Bolton was said to be falling bind the rest of the conurbation.

The public-sector IT specialist, Shaping Cloud, was engaged in 2018 to conduct an asset review of the current software applications used across 20 NHS and local government organisations involved in the Greater Manchester Health and Social Care Partnership.

A partnership between Health Innovation Manchester and the Association of British HealthTech Industries, to be known as the Greater Manchester Health Technologies Group was announced in November 2018.

=== Development ===
By November 2019 when Rouse left it appeared that enthusiasm for the devolution project in health was waning in Whitehall. Greater Manchester was no longer treated as exceptional, but integrated into the NHS England regional structure. Financial performance was slightly better than average but performance against A&E targets was worse. A provider federation board has been established, which has taken over some of the functions and funding of the devolution team.

The Greater Manchester Health and Social Care Partnership, declared a climate emergency in April and produced a sustainable development management plan in January 2020. This plans to save approximately 2 million pieces of plastic cutlery and 800,000 straws and stirrers per year by switching to sustainable alternatives. It hopes to replace single-use surgical gowns with reusable, laundered versions and to reduce the use of medical gloves.

In June 2020 Andy Burnham proposed that Greater Manchester should be a pilot for the next phase of joining up social care with NHS services. He envisaged a joined up workforce, including more common training; a "new deal" of pay and conditions for care staff; funding flows via a combined "year of care" health and care tariff, and further institutional integration.

Integrated care system; the proposal in the Health and Care Bill 2021 to put regional integration on a statutory basis led to changes in Greater Manchester. A provider federation board, chaired by Sir Mike Deegan, was established in 2021 and it is intended that this will manage the bulk of the area's acute care funding, around £4 billion annually, when integrated care systems are given statutory existence in 2022.

In July 2021 plans were reported for a "shared executive group", chaired by the chief accountable officer, which would meet every week and set the agenda for both the statutory ICS boards (the NHS board and the wider partnership board).

== See also ==
- Health in Manchester
- Category:Health in Greater Manchester
- Healthcare in the United Kingdom
