= Birch Hill Hospital =

Health facility in Wardle, Greater Manchester, England (1877–2013)

- Pennine Care NHS Foundation Trust
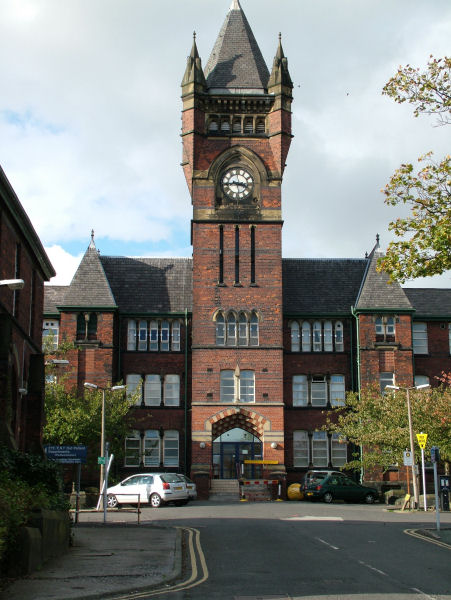
- Birch Hill Hospital

- Shown in Greater Manchester

Geography
- Location: Rochdale, Greater Manchester, England
- Coordinates: 53.6401°N 2.1213°W

Organisation
- Care system: NHS
- Type: Community hospital

Services
- Emergency department: No

History
- Founded: 1877

Birch Hill Hospital is a health facility in Wardle, Littleborough, near Rochdale, Greater Manchester. It was managed by Pennine Acute Hospitals NHS Trust when it was a general hospital. Parts of the hospital are now managed as a psychiatric hospital by Pennine Care. There is also the Floyd Unit which is a Neuro Rehabilitation Unit managed by Pennine Acute.

== History ==
The facility has its origins in the Dearnley Union Workhouse which was designed by George Woodhouse and Edward Potts and opened in November 1877. An infirmary was added at the north of the site in 1902. During the First World War parts of the hospital housed injured service personnel.

It became the Dearnley Public Assistance Institution in 1930 and joined the National Health Service as Birch Hill Hospital in 1948. From 1974 Rochdale District Health Authority managed the Rochdale Hospitals, including Birch Hill and Rochdale Infirmary. In 1992 Rochdale Healthcare NHS Trust was formed. Rochdale Healthcare NHS Trust became part of Pennine Acute NHS Hospitals Trust following a merger of 5 hospital sites in April 2002.

After services transferred to Rochdale Infirmary, Birch Hill Hospital closed in January 2013. The site was subsequently sold to Persimmon for residential use: the developers have retained the clock tower as part of the new development.

Other parts of the hospital were retained and there is now a psychiatric hospital on a smaller site. In 2011 Prospect Place a low secure mental health unit for men with severe and enduring mental health problems was opened, having cost £13.6 million to build.

== Facilities ==
The current psychiatric hospital consists of a Low Secure Male Rehabilitation Unit (Prospect Place), an Adult Mental Health outpatient facility and two Acute Mental Health wards (Moorside and Hollingworth), Older People's Mental Health including outpatients (Beech Ward), an outpatient Child and Adolescent Mental Health Unit, as well as a Neuro-Rehabilitation ward (the Floyd Unit).
