= James Niven =

British doctor (1851–1925)

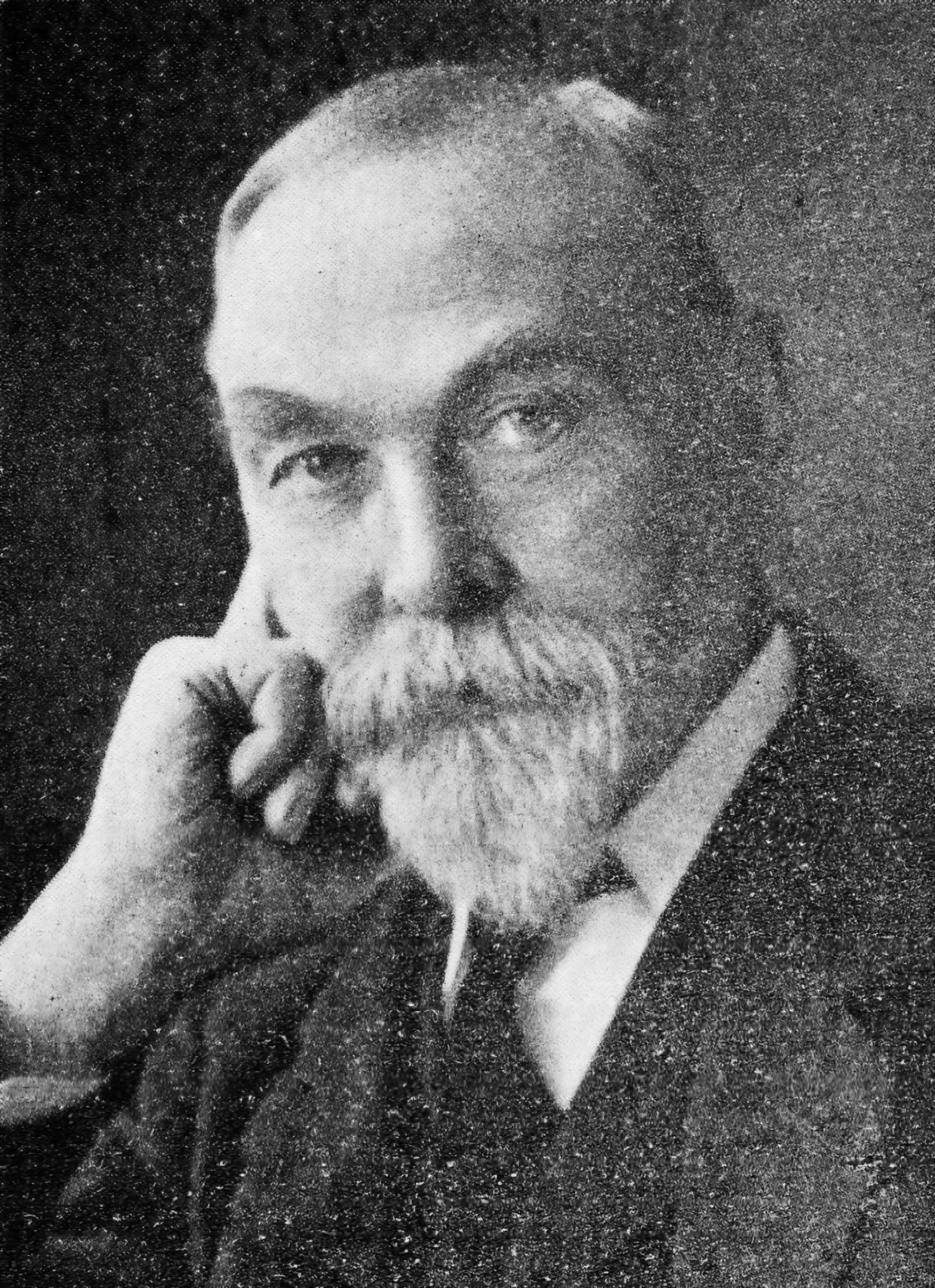

Medical Officer of Health for Oldham
- In office 1886–1894

Medical Officer of Health for Manchester
- In office 1894–1922

Personal details
- Born: 12 August 1851 Peterhead, Scotland
- Died: 30 September 1925 (aged 74) Douglas, Isle of Man
- Spouse: Margaret Adams (m. 1894; died 1912)
- Children: 3
- Education: University of Aberdeen; Queens' College, Cambridge
- Profession: Physician

James Niven (12 August 1851 – 30 September 1925) was a Scottish physician, perhaps best known for his work during the Spanish Flu outbreak in 1918 as Manchester's Medical Officer of Health. He held that position for 28 years (1894–1922), until he retired. He had previously been Oldham's Medical Officer of Health. He lectured in Public Health in Manchester. He died by suicide in 1925.

== Background ==
A son of Charles Niven, James was born in Peterhead on 12 August 1851. He graduated with a Scottish MA from the University of Aberdeen and from 1870 studied at Queens' College, Cambridge, gaining his BA in 1874 as 8th Wrangler in the Mathematical Tripos and becoming a fellow at Queens'. His intention was to study engineering but he switched to the study of medicine after gaining his Cambridge MA in 1877.

Niven trained in medicine at St Thomas' Hospital in London. He qualified in 1880, as MB, and worked first for the Metropolitan Asylums Board, being appointed an Assistant Medical Officer at the Deptford fever and smallpox hospital. It was not long before he left that post to take up a private practice in Manchester.

== Medical Officer of Health for Oldham ==
In 1886, Niven left private practice after four years and was appointed as Medical Officer of Health for Oldham, a post that he held until 1894. He was simultaneously appointed as Medical Superintendent at Westhulme Hospital. During that time, he campaigned to have tuberculosis classed as a notifiable disease by the town's council, obtaining the support of local medical practitioners but failing in his pioneering aim. Doctors and physicians in Oldham raised enough money to send Niven to Berlin to study with Robert Koch, who had discovered the TB bacillus in 1882, thereby proving that the disease was not caused by "bad air" as was generally believed in accordance with the prevalent miasma theory. He also used Koch's treatment at the Oldham General Infirmary on his return, as well as dealing with smallpox, typhus, measles, scarlet fever and whooping cough. An Oldham Chronicle obituary of 1925 said: "Dr Niven also showed an interest in child welfare well in advance of his time."

According to medical historian William Povey, whilst at Oldham Niven was "instrumental in improving the standard of housing, of sewage and refuse disposal, of the milk and water supply, in reducing smoke pollution, and containing the spread of infectious diseases." He wrote several papers on the latter subject and was awarded a BCh degree in 1889.

== Medical Officer of Health for Manchester ==
Niven moved to his new post as Medical Officer of Health for Manchester in 1894 and remained in that role until his retirement in 1922. He succeeded John Tatham in the role after being preferred over 32 other applicants and became the longest-serving holder of the post, which was abolished in 1974.

Niven dealt with many of the same public health problems in Manchester as he had while in Oldham. During his 28-year term of office, the city's population grew from 517,000 to 770,000 but the death rate per 1,000 population fell from 24.26 to 13.82 in 1921, largely as a consequence of his work. Among the notable strategies that he pursued was the conversion of 85,000 houses to water closets from pail closets and a more intensive slum clearance programme than had existed previously, which resulted in the demolition of 23,000 unsuitable houses.

On Niven's initiative tuberculosis became a voluntary notifiable disease in the city in 1899. He was also responsible for Monsall Hospital, a fever hospital, being bought by Manchester Corporation from its then owners, the Manchester Royal Infirmary.

Niven is noted for trying to restrict the impact in Manchester of the Spanish Flu pandemic that spread to Britain towards the end of World War I. He was probably the first Medical Officer of Health to enforce preventive measures to stop the spread of disease. In addition, the biographical records held by the Manchester Medical Collection note that he was "recognised as responsible for major improvements of public health in Manchester - slum clearance, milk supply, Monsall Fever Hospital, smoke pollution and health visiting." His background in mathematics was advantageous for compilation of statistics and he became president of both the Epidemiological Section of the Royal Society of Medicine and the Manchester Statistical Society, as well as lecturer in public health.

== Life and legacy ==
In 1894 Niven married Margaret Adams (d.1912) and together they had three daughters.

In 1923, Niven published Observations on the History of Public Health Effort in Manchester.

Following his retirement in 1922 he developed depression and died by suicide on 30 September 1925 at Douglas on the Isle of Man by taking an overdose and swimming out to sea. He requested that he be buried at sea and was survived by his daughters.

During his lifetime, Niven received recognition for his pioneering work in Public Health. This included an honorary degree from the University of Aberdeen and the presidency of the Section of Public Health at the Annual Meeting of the British Medical Association in Manchester in 1902. The Royal Institute of Public Health awarded medals to him.

A dramatisation of the Spanish flu period in Manchester was transmitted on BBC television as Spanish Flu: The Forgotten Fallen on 5 August 2009 and again on 25 September 2012. On 17 March and 26 November 2020, the 2018 documentary "The Flu That Killed 50 million" was rebroadcast, and Niven and his work featured heavily.

== See also ==
- John Leigh

Professional and academic associations
| Preceded by Frederick Brocklehurst | President of the Manchester Statistical Society; 1907–09 | Succeeded by S. J. Chapman |
