= Pennine Care NHS Foundation Trust =

- Type: Mental health trust
- Chair: Claudette Elliott
- Chief executive: Anthony Hassall
- Staff: 4,700 (March 2026)
- Website: www.penninecare.nhs.uk

Pennine Care NHS Trust is an NHS foundation trust in northern England, providing mental health and learning disability services in parts of Greater Manchester and Derbyshire. It provides mental health and learning disability services in Bury, Rochdale, Oldham, Stockport, Tameside and Glossop.

The trust also provided community care until 2019, when most community services transferred to the Northern Care Alliance, an NHS Group formed around the same time by combining Pennine Acute Hospitals NHS Trust and Salford Royal NHS Foundation Trust. Community services based in Trafford transferred to Manchester University NHS Foundation Trust.

In 2017, the Greater Manchester Resilience Hub was set up in response to the Manchester Arena attack, to co-ordinate care and support for thousands of children, young people and adults whose mental health and/or emotional wellbeing was affected. This service is hosted by Pennine Care in partnership with Greater Manchester Mental Health NHS Foundation Trust, Manchester University NHS Foundation Trust and Northwest Boroughs Healthcare NHS Foundation Trust.

The trust set up a new system, the Street Triage service, to provide 24-hour advice to police officers and paramedics in Tameside on the best place to take patients during incidents. This is intended cut the number of people detained in custody under the Mental Health Act.

The trust was established in April 2002, and in July 2008 it was the 100th trust to be awarded Foundation status.

== See also ==
- Healthcare in Greater Manchester
- List of NHS trusts
