= Pennine Acute Hospitals NHS Trust =

NHS hospital trust

- Type: NHS trust
- Established: 28 January 2002
- Headquarters: Delaunays Road; Manchester; M8 5RB
- Area size: Greater Manchester
- Hospitals: Fairfield General Hospital; Rochdale Infirmary; Royal Oldham Hospital
- Chief executive: Raj Jain
- Website: www.pat.nhs.uk

Pennine Acute Hospitals NHS Trust was an acute hospital trust which, until 2019, operated Fairfield General Hospital in Bury, North Manchester General Hospital, the Royal Oldham Hospital and Rochdale Infirmary, all in Greater Manchester. It is now part of the Northern Care Alliance NHS Group. North Manchester General Hospital was formally acquired by Manchester University NHS Foundation Trust on April 1, 2021. The trust also operated Bury General Hospital which closed in 2006.

It should not be confused with Pennine Care NHS Foundation Trust, which is also based in Greater Manchester.

== Management ==
In 2014, Dr. Fairfield, the Chief Executive of Northumberland, Tyne and Wear NHS Foundation Trust moved to the trust on the retirement of John Saxby. In march 2016, the trust was rated as "inadequate" by the CQC, and asked Salford Royal NHS Foundation Trust to assume immediate leadership of the trust prior to the future demerger of the North Manchester General Hospital site. In April 2016, Sir David Dalton was appointed to take over the leadership of the trust and the functions of the board were taken over by directors from Salford Royal Foundation Trust, although Pennine Acute still had a legal existence.

In 2020, it became necessary to re-establish the board because of complexities involved in formally transferring its assets to other trusts. It was intended to disband it by April 2020. The hospitals in Oldham, Bury and Rochdale would continue to be run by Salford, while North Manchester hospital would be run by Manchester University NHS Foundation Trust under a management agreement. The other trusts are resisting taking over the liabilities associated with these hospitals, and North Manchester is said to require rebuilding at a cost of around £500 million. The re-established board will not be involved in the management of the hospitals.

=== Northern Care Alliance ===
In December 2017, it was announced that the trust was to form a new healthcare organisation by combining with Salford Royal NHS Foundation Trust. The new organisation, the Northern Care Alliance NHS Group would have 17,000 staff, and a combined operating budget of £1.3bn covering Oldham, Bury and Rochdale, and Salford. North Manchester General Hospital would be taken over by Manchester University NHS Foundation Trust.

In April 2019, Raj Jain became chief executive of Northern Care Alliance NHS Group and of Pennine Acute Trust.

The Alliance is Greater Manchester’s first Global Digital Exemplar Fast Follower organisation, investing £10 million in digital technology for patient care systems across its hospitals in Bury, Oldham, Rochdale and North Manchester which will replicate projects already deployed at the Salford trust, including an online appointment management system for patients. In 2019 the trust had 650 physical and virtual servers and more than 30 clinical systems, some of which had proved increasingly unreliable.

== Performance ==
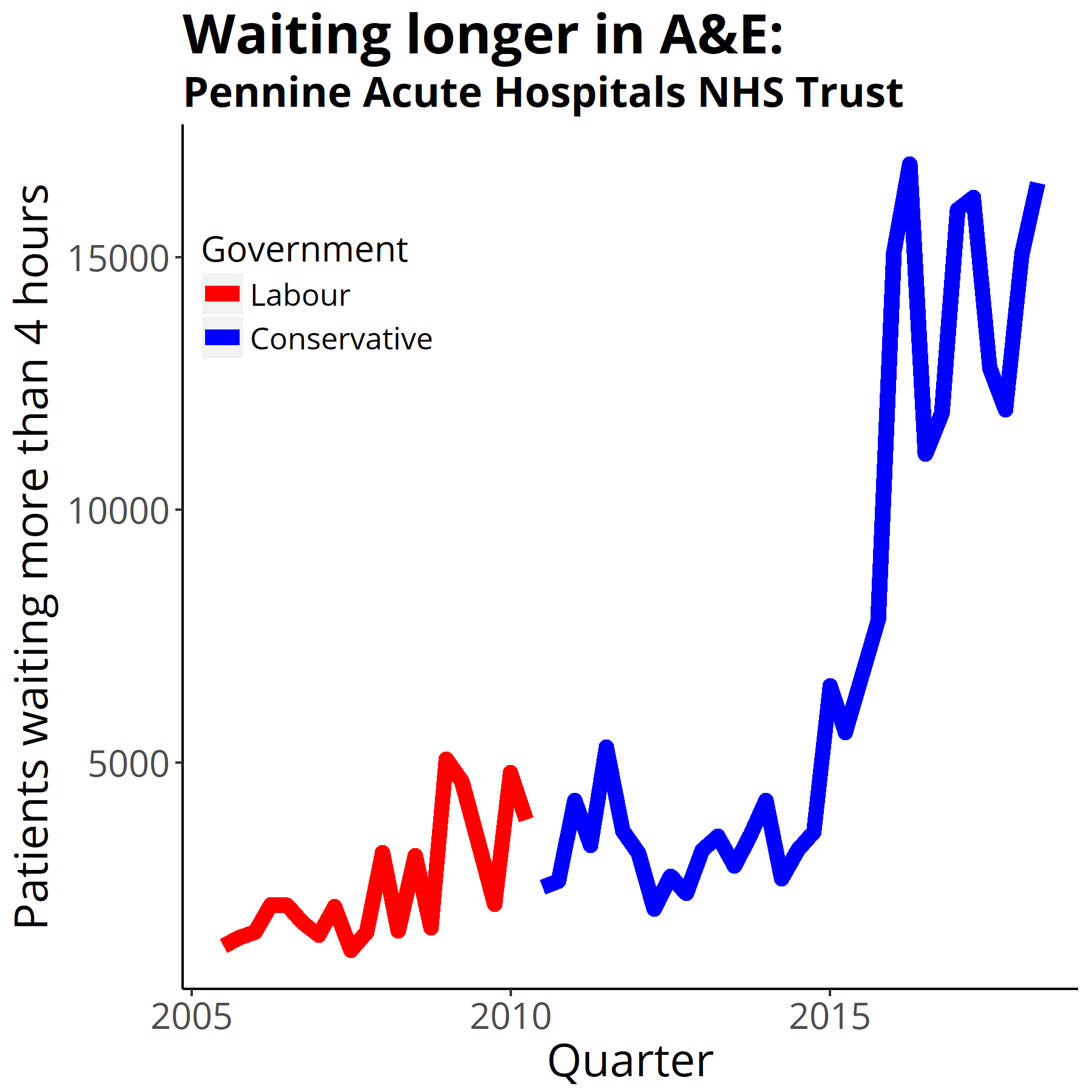
Four-hour target in the emergency department quarterly figures from NHS England Data from https://www.england.nhs.uk/statistics/statistical-work-areas/ae-waiting-times-and-activity/

The trust was highly commended in the progressive research culture category at the Health Service Journal Awards 2012 and has seen a large increase in recruitment to clinical trials.

The trust did poorly in the Friends and Family Test in March 2013, with 48% of staff saying they would not recommend their workplace to relatives and friends, placing it in the bottom 20 in England.

The trust was one of 26 responsible for half of the national growth in patients waiting more than four hours in accident and emergency over the 2014/2015 winter.

In December 2015, it was reported that the trust envisaged moving all non-elective surgery away from North Manchester General Hospital as a result of the decision to centralise emergency surgery on 4 sites in the conurbation.

In the last quarter of 2015 it had one of the worst performances of any hospital in England against the four hour waiting target. In March 2016, at least 70 emergency patients at the trust waited more than 12 hours to be allocated a bed. This was the highest figure for any trust in England. In 2016/2017, it had 786 cases where patients waited more than 12 hours to be admitted to a ward, about a quarter of the total for England, mostly at North Manchester General Hospital. There were 200 cases the previous year.

== Overseas patients ==
The trust issued invoices to patients thought to be ineligible for NHS treatment totalling £1.4 million in 2018–2019, but only collected £0.1 million.

== See also ==
- Healthcare in Greater Manchester
- List of NHS trusts
