= Stockport NHS Foundation Trust =

NHS trust

- Established: 1 April 2004
- Hospitals: Stepping Hill Hospital
- Chair: Tony Warne
- Chief executive: Karen James
- Staff: 5,000 (2020)
- Website: stockport.nhs.uk

Stockport NHS Foundation Trust is an NHS foundation trust, which runs Stepping Hill Hospital as well as other community and specialist services in Stockport.

Stockport NHS Foundation Trust provides hospital services for children and adults across Stockport and the High Peak area of Derbyshire, as well as community health services for Stockport, Tameside and Glossop. On 1 April 2004 Foundation Trust status was established, one of the first NHS organisations in the country to achieve the foundation trust position. The Trust provides acute hospital care predominantly across Stockport and the High Peak and employs over 5,800 staff working across two hospital sites and over 41 community clinics. Tony Warne is the Trust's Chairman, after taking over in May 2021.

== History ==
Stockport NHS Trust formed in April 2000, following the merger of Stockport Acute Services and Stockport Healthcare NHS Trust. The organisation became a foundation trust in 2004 - one of the first ten foundation trusts in the UK. The Trust was the first in the country to achieve Clinical Pathology Accreditation for their point of care testing in December 2011. Stockport NHS Foundation Trust was the first in the country to be awarded international ISO accreditation for emergency planning - April 2013.

The 12 Greater Manchester Clinical Commissioning Groups agreed in July 2015 that Stepping Hill Hospital should be one of the four centres for emergency surgery in the region.

In July 2016 the trust announced plans that could reduce its staffing establishment by 7% after it ended 2015-16 with a deficit of £12.9 million.

A new £20 million medical and surgical centre with 120 bed spaces, an acute medical unit, a surgical assessment unit, and a short stay surgical unit and 18 operating theatres opened in October 2016 for emergency and high risk general surgery. It has capacity for more than 30,000 operations every year.

The trust formed a partnership, Stockport Together, with Stockport Council, the Stockport Clinical Commissioning Group and Pennine Care NHS Foundation Trust in 2017. The initial plans envisaged a single accountable care organisation run by a new care trust, but later an alliance model to progress the integration plans and service developments was proposed. Adrian Belton took over as Chair in June 2017 and was replaced by Tony Warne in 2021.

It was one of the beneficiaries of Boris Johnson's announcement of capital funding for the NHS in August 2019, with an allocation of £30.6 million for a new Emergency Care Campus at Stepping Hill Hospital.

== Performance ==
In the last quarter of 2015 it had one of the worst performances of any hospital in England against the four hour waiting target.

The Care Quality Commission rated the A&E department inadequate both in safety and leadership in October 2017. They noted low nurse staffing levels and shift fill rates, poor compliance with the early warning score system and infection control.

In 2017-18 only 78.7% of A&E patients were seen within four hours.

The last Care Quality Commission inspection, in February 2020, resulted in an overall finding of "requires improvement".

== See also ==
- Healthcare in Greater Manchester
- List of NHS trusts
