= David Nigel Dalton =

British medical administrator

Sir David Nigel Dalton is the interim chief executive of Liverpool University Hospitals NHS Foundation Trust and previously Salford Royal NHS Foundation Trust and Pennine Acute Hospitals NHS Trust in northern England. In April 2016, he was appointed as Chief Executive of Pennine Acute Hospitals NHS Trust, in addition to his role as Chief Executive of Salford Royal NHS Foundation Trust, a post he held since 2001. He stepped down from the roles in March 2019, around the time that management of both trusts was combined under the Northern Care Alliance NHS Group.

Dalton joined the National Health Service (NHS) as an administrative trainee in 1980. In April 2011 he was named as the tenth highest paid employee (£232,600) in the English NHS.

In February 2014 he was asked by the Secretary of State for Health, Jeremy Hunt, to advise him how to "make it easy for NHS super-heads to take over struggling organisations". His report, produced in December 2014, suggested that concessions could be established by which companies are given contracts to operate publicly funded hospitals. He points to Ribera Salud Grupo in Spain and AMEOS group in Germany and Austria as examples that could be followed.

== 2016 junior doctor negotiations ==
In January 2016, Dalton was appointed by Hunt to act as the chief negotiator on behalf of the government and NHS Employers in negotiations with the British Medical Association (BMA) over the junior doctors' contract. After the BMA declined a final offer to end the dispute in February, Dalton wrote to Hunt that negotiations had finished and to "do whatever it deems necessary to end uncertainty for the service". The Secretary of State then announced on 11 February 2016 that the contracts would be unilaterally imposed with no further negotiations.

In support of Dalton's letter to the Secretary of State advising the government, the names of twenty NHS chief executives were appended following a paragraph stating "I confirm that this position is supported by both the NHS Confederation and NHS Providers, together with support from chief executives across the country, and their names are supplied." However, ten of the executives later denied they had supported the imposition and Dalton later admitted that chief executives named had not signed the letter.

== Awards and recognition ==
Dalton was knighted in the New Year Honours 2014 and was one of the top ten chief executives in the NHS in 2013 according to the Health Service Journal. In 2015 and 2016 the HSJ rated him as the top chief executive.
