= Westhulme Hospital =

- Pennine Acute Hospitals NHS Trust
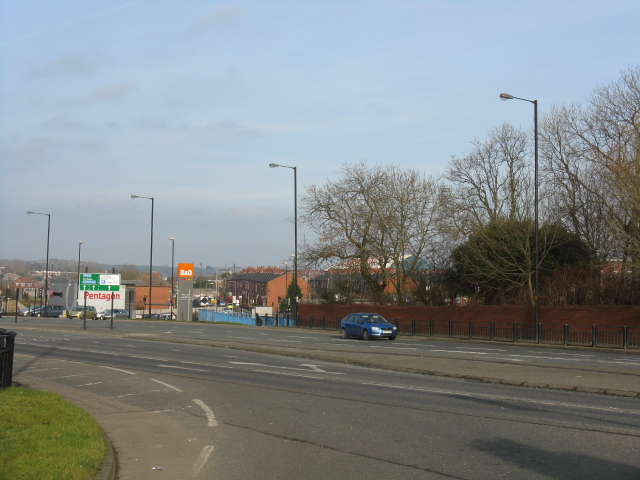
- Chadderton Way: the hospital was behind the brick wall on the right

- Shown in Greater Manchester

Geography
- Location: Oldham, Greater Manchester, England, United Kingdom
- Coordinates: 53.5515°N 2.1318°W

Organisation
- Care system: Public NHS
- Type: District General Hospital

History
- Founded: 1878
- Closed: 1990

Links
- Lists: Hospitals in England

Westhulme Hospital, formerly known as Westhulme Fever Hospital, was an institution in Oldham, England. At one time a hospital for infectious diseases, it later became a site used by several health-related organisations.

== History ==
Westhulme Hospital was one of several isolation hospitals established in Lancashire during the 1870s as a response to smallpox epidemics prevalent in the region at that time. Opening in 1878, it was larger and more suited to treating a range of infectious diseases than some other examples, such as those at Blackpool and Blackburn. It initially comprised three eight-bed wards and three single-bed rooms in wooden buildings. Scarlet fever cases were a substantial proportion of its early intake and in 1880, coinciding with the introduction of local legislation making notification of infectious diseases compulsory, it was decided to create more permanent structures. The new buildings attracted 13,000 people visiting as viewers. Following initial suspicions concerning its function, the hospital catered for patients from a wide demographic, including mothers with children, tradespeople and paupers.

A substantial portion of its area was subsumed in the 1980s when the Chadderton Way road was built and the hospital itself closed in around 1990.

In 2006, the Pennine Acute Hospitals NHS Trust announced that it was to sell the site, which at that time housed its offices, to alleviate a £28m debt crisis. The 284 staff on the site were to be redeployed among the Trust's other hospital sites. In 2012, after 135 years, it was reported that outline planning permission was in place for development of the remainder for housing purposes, although one potential alternative was for it to be used for car park facilities serving the Royal Oldham Hospital. The site was subsequently developed as an Audi car dealership for Jardine Motors Group, which opened in 2017.

== Notable people ==
Notable people associated with the hospital included James Niven who was superintendent there in the 1880s.
