= Humphrey Potts =

English barrister and judge

Sir Francis Humphrey Potts (18 August 1931 – 2 December 2012) was an English barrister and judge. He presided over several high-profile cases including the Jeffrey Archer perjury trial and the trial of Anthony Sawoniuk. Sawoniuk, who died in 2005, is the only person to have been convicted under the War Crimes Act 1991

Born in County Durham in 1931, he grew up in Penshaw, where his parents were farmers. He was educated at the Royal Grammar School, Newcastle where he was a contemporary and life-long friend of Peter Taylor and Geoffrey Bindman.

He read law at St Catherine's College, Oxford and was called to the Bar at Lincoln's Inn in 1955.

His practice consisted of civil and criminal cases largely on the North Eastern Circuit. He took silk in 1971, became a Recorder and was appointed High Court judge, of the Queen's Bench Division in 1986.

Between 1988 and 1991 he served as Presiding Judge of the North East Circuit. He also sat on several judicial bodies including the Parole Board, the Criminal Injuries Compensation Board and the Mental Health Review Tribunal. In 1997 he was appointed the chairman of the newly created Special Immigration Appeals Commission. In one of the final trials he presided over, in July 2001, Potts sentenced Jeffrey Archer to four years in prison for perjury.

He retired in 2001 and lived in Hownam in the Scottish Borders until his death, aged 81, in 2012
