= AMEOS group =

Swiss hospital group

AMEOS group is a Swiss hospital group which runs 68 facilities in Germany and Austria, including a significant amount of public healthcare. It was set up in 2002 in Zurich by physician Axel Paeger. AMEOS identifies and buys failing hospitals.

Major investors are Quadriga Capital and The Carlyle Group.

Sir David Dalton's report on new opportunities for providers of NHS care contains a case study of AMEOS.

== History ==
The company was founded in 2002 by Axel Paeger and Martin Kerres. In 2003, the newly founded company took over the psychiatric clinics in Haldensleben and, in the same year, Karl Dieter Heines' private psychiatric specialist clinic in Bremen. In June 2004, Ameos acquired the St. Salvator District Hospital in Halberstadt and during the year the clinic in Anklam as well as several facilities in Ueckermünde, including the acute care hospital and the forensic clinic. In 2005 the facilities in Heiligenhafen and Neustadt.

In 2005, the company founder Martin Kerres left the company and founded the Valdonica winery in Tuscany, Italy. In 2007, the group acquired two of the eight state hospitals put up for sale by the state of Lower Saxony: the psychiatric clinics in Hildesheim and in Osnabrück. The clinic in Lübeck followed in 2008, and in 2009 the facilities in Oldenburg i. H. In 2010, Ameos took over the Klinikum Alfeld from the district of Hildesheim, and opened the AMEOS Klinikum Pasewalk, a psychiatric day clinic, the Ameos Poliklinikum Ueckermünde and the Ameos Pflege Halberstadt.

Since June 2011, the group has been the sole sponsor of the clinics in Bad Aussee and since August also of the Inntalklinikum Simbach.
