= Mildred Nodal =

(1861–1947) British nursing matron

Mildred Alice Nodal
- Born: 8 December 1861; Chorlton, Lancaster
- Died: 26 June 1947 (aged 85); Denbigh, Wales
- Education: The London Hospital
- Occupation: Nursing leader

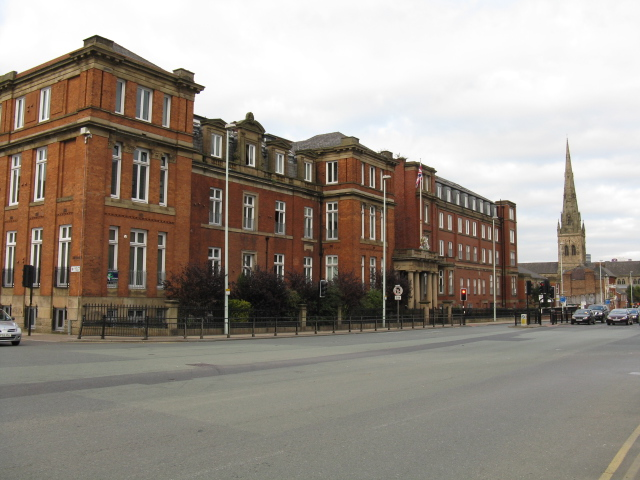
Salford Royal Hospital

Mildred Alice Nodal (8 December 1861–26 June 1947), RRC, was Matron of Salford Royal Hospital, Salford, Lancashire, for nearly 20 years, and a founder member of the College of Nursing (now Royal College of Nursing) and the Institute of Massage and Remedial Gymnastics.

== Early life ==
Nodal was born on 8 December 1861 in the Chorlton district of Manchester, to her parents, John Howard, a newspaper editor of the Manchester City News and chairman of Manchester Arts Club, and his wife Helen.

== Nursing career ==
Nodal lived at home until she commenced nurse training in February 1892 at The London Hospital under the matron Eva Luckes. When Nodal qualified in May 1894 she was employed as a staff nurse at the hospital for 18 months, until she returned home in August 1895. Her mother Helen had died just a few months before in May 1895. In January 1900 Nodal was appointed as Assistant Matron, National Hospital for Neurological Diseases, London where she worked for at least a year. She subsequently worked at the Royal London Ophthalmic Hospital, London, and the General Lying in Hospital, London. In April 1905 Nodal returned to The London Hospital as a temporary massage sister, but refused to committ to a years contract as she wanted a matronship, so she left after six months. In February 1906 Nodal was appointed as Assistant Matron, General Hospital, Birmingham, and in December 1907 she was appointed as matron of Salford Royal Hospital, Salford, Lancashire. Nodal remained there until 1924, during which time she oversaw the opening of a new nurses home, which included a theatre and flat roof garden. Nodal was involved with the East Lancashire Territorial Force Association and accepted candidates who wished to sign up as territorial nurses during the build up to the First World War. In 1916 she was a founding member of the Institute of Massage and Remedial Gymnastics (the precursor to the Chartered Society of Physiotherapy).

== Retirement and death ==
Nodal retired in 1924. She was living in Rhyl, Wales at the outbreak of the Second World War, and she died there on 26 June 1947.

== Honours ==
- Royal Red Cross, 1917
