= Bury General Hospital =

Hospital in Bury, Great Manchester

- Pennine Acute Hospitals NHS Trust
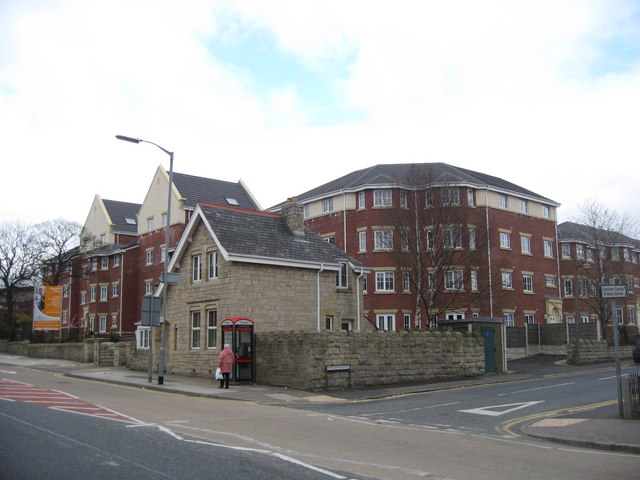
- The old lodge, all that remains of Bury General Hospital

- Shown in Greater Manchester

Geography
- Location: Bury, Greater Manchester, England
- Coordinates: 53°36′31″N 2°17′25″W

Organisation
- Care system: National Health Service
- Type: District General

History
- Founded: 1882
- Closed: 2006

Bury General Hospital was a hospital in Bury, Greater Manchester. It opened as the Bury Dispensary Hospital in 1882. After the accident and emergency department and most facilities moved to the more modern Fairfield General Hospital in 2001, Bury General Hospital finally closed in 2006.

== History ==
In 1882, two local businessmen Thomas Norris and Thomas Wringley opened the Bury Dispensary Hospital on Walmersley Road. It replaced an older dispensary between Bury Lane and Bolton Street. Sometime in the 20th-century, a children's ward was built to the left hand side of the site.

== Closure ==
In 1997, the Bury and Rochdale Health Authority approved the move of all facilities from Bury General Hospital to Fairfield General Hospital. This was because of the poor condition of the then 92 year old building and its limited bed capacity. In 1998, the Authority commissioned a £24 million extension to the Fairfield General Hospital complex. After the works were complete, the accident and emergency centre moved to Fairfield General Hospital in September 2001. Bury General Hospital finally closed in 2006.
