= Health in Manchester =

Health in Manchester is among the poorest in the country. Manchester and the surrounding areas have been notorious for their poor health since the eighteenth century.

The poor physique of men in Manchester caused a national scandal when three out of every five volunteers for the Boer War were deemed unfit.

For many years, the health of the people of Manchester was the worst of any local authority in England. In 2006, the life expectancy for men in Manchester was the lowest in England: 72.5 years, compared with the average of 76.9 years. The Index of Deprivation 2004 placed Manchester as the second most deprived local authority in England. The figures for the North of the city were worse than those for the South. In 2015, the health of Manchester still compared poorly to other parts of the country in many respects.

An estimated 600,000 residents of Greater Manchester face extreme poverty, and about 1.6 million more people are currently at risk of sliding into deeper poverty. They are thought to be isolated, scared, frustrated, and deprived of food.

== 18th century ==
The expansion of the town was very rapid at the end of the 18th century. There was a great influx of people from country areas. The poor were "crowded in in offensive, dark, damp and incommodious habitations, a too fertile source of disease". Dr. John Ferriar, a physician at Manchester Royal Infirmary in 1795, helped to set up a board of health which rented four houses in Portland Street belonging to the lunatic asylum for use as a fever hospital. He described to the Committee for the Regulation of the Police the appalling living conditions in cellars without lighting, sanitation or ventilation. People newly arrived from the country were particularly vulnerable to fevers. The board pressed for the wheels of machinery to be guarded against accidents. A scheme for inoculating poor people for smallpox was started in 1784. Jenner's scheme of vaccination was enthusiastically adopted in 1800, and 1,000 people were vaccinated in six months.

== 19th century ==
The best-known critique of the social conditions in Manchester was written by Friedrich Engels, whilst visiting the city between 1842 and 1844. He worked at the family-owned mill, Ermen and Engels at Weaste, Salford, and spent his leisure time visiting poor working-class communities. Off Oxford Road on the south side of Manchester, Engels found 40,000 Irish immigrants living in abhorrent conditions of filth and stench in an area known as Irish Town. Through his observations, he established that mortality from infectious diseases such as fevers, smallpox, measles, and whooping cough was four times higher than in outlying rural areas, and that mortality rates were significantly higher than the national average. He directly related these stark health indicators to the appalling living and working conditions of workers, which were driven by capitalist enterprise: "Women made unfit for childbearing, children deformed, men enfeebled, limbs crushed, whole generations wrecked, afflicted with disease and infirmity, purely to fill the purses of the bourgeoisie." 18,000 Irish inhabitants were reported to be living in Manchester cellars. 15% of them were sleeping with more than three people in one bed.

== Medical Officer of Health ==
Manchester first appointed a Medical Officer of Health in 1868, sometime after Liverpool, where William Duncan was appointed in 1847. James Niven was appointed MOH for Oldham in 1886 and moved to Manchester in 1922. He is credited with reducing the death rate in Manchester from 24.26 per 1,000 people in 1893 to 13.82 per 1,000 in 1921 through an "intense zeal, perseverance, and courage of conviction" that drove sanitary reforms and waged war on infectious disease.

The Manchester Corporation (General Powers) Act 1899 (62 & 63 Vict. c. clxxxviii), as amended by the Manchester Corporation (General Powers) Act 1904 (4 Edw. 7. c. ccxxxv), contained what were known as `milk clauses', which empowered public analysts to prosecute anyone who knowingly sold milk from cows with tuberculosis of the udder, to demand the isolation of infected cows and notification of any cow exhibiting signs of tuberculosis of the udder, and to inspect the cows and take samples from herds which supplied milk to the city. Other local authorities soon copied these provisions.

== 2015 ==
Manchester City Council and the three Clinical Commissioning Groups produced a document entitled "A Healthier Manchester" in December 2015 in relation to the DevoManc proposals. This included figures about the health of the city, including:

- Smoking: the highest number of smoking-related deaths in England – 750 and 1,550 hospital admissions
- Respiratory conditions: the second-highest rate of early death in England
- Heart disease: 350 deaths under the age of 75
- Alcohol: double the average hospital admissions in England
- Diabetes: 27,000 diagnosed patients – 5.9% of the population
- Obesity: 25% of year 6 children and 26% of adults
- Cancer: the worst city in England for premature death from cancer
- Dementia: 2,895 diagnosed patients

== See also ==
- Healthcare in Greater Manchester
