= Salford Royal NHS Foundation Trust =

Coordinates: 53°29′14″N 2°19′25″W

Salford Royal NHS Foundation Trust operated Salford Royal Hospital in Greater Manchester until 2017. Its chief executive is Dr Owen Williams.

In December 2017 it was announced that the Trust was to form a new healthcare organisation by combining with Pennine Acute Hospitals NHS Trust. The new organisation, to be called the Northern Care Alliance NHS Group, would have 17,000 staff, and a combined operating budget of £1.3bn covering Oldham, Bury, Rochdale, Salford and North Manchester.

== History ==
In July 2016 the trust was to initiate an integrated care organisation which would include 440 adult social care staff transferred from the City of Salford. Mental health services were to be provided by Greater Manchester Mental Health NHS Foundation Trust but Salford would manage the contract. It was hoped that this would deliver £36 million a year in savings by 2021, largely by reducing hospital admissions, cutting management costs and removing duplication.

In September 2016, the trust was selected by NHS England as one of twelve Global Digital Exemplars. It uses an Allscripts electronic patient record system which is being adopted by other NHS organisations nearby. It planned to move its electronic patient records to Microsoft Azure by March 2018.

Northern Care Alliance NHS Group took over management of the trust's activities in 2017.

In 2019 the trust established a 10-year partnership with Hitachi Consulting to set up a digital control centre which "will be able to better match patient and service user individual needs to available resources so that waste and waiting is minimised", at a cost of £25 million.

David Dalton (later Sir David) was chief executive from 2001 until April 2019, when he stepped down and was replaced by Raj Jain, who is also chief executive of the Northern Care Alliance NHS Group.

== Performance ==
In 2015, the trust was one of the top performing NHS trusts in the United Kingdom.

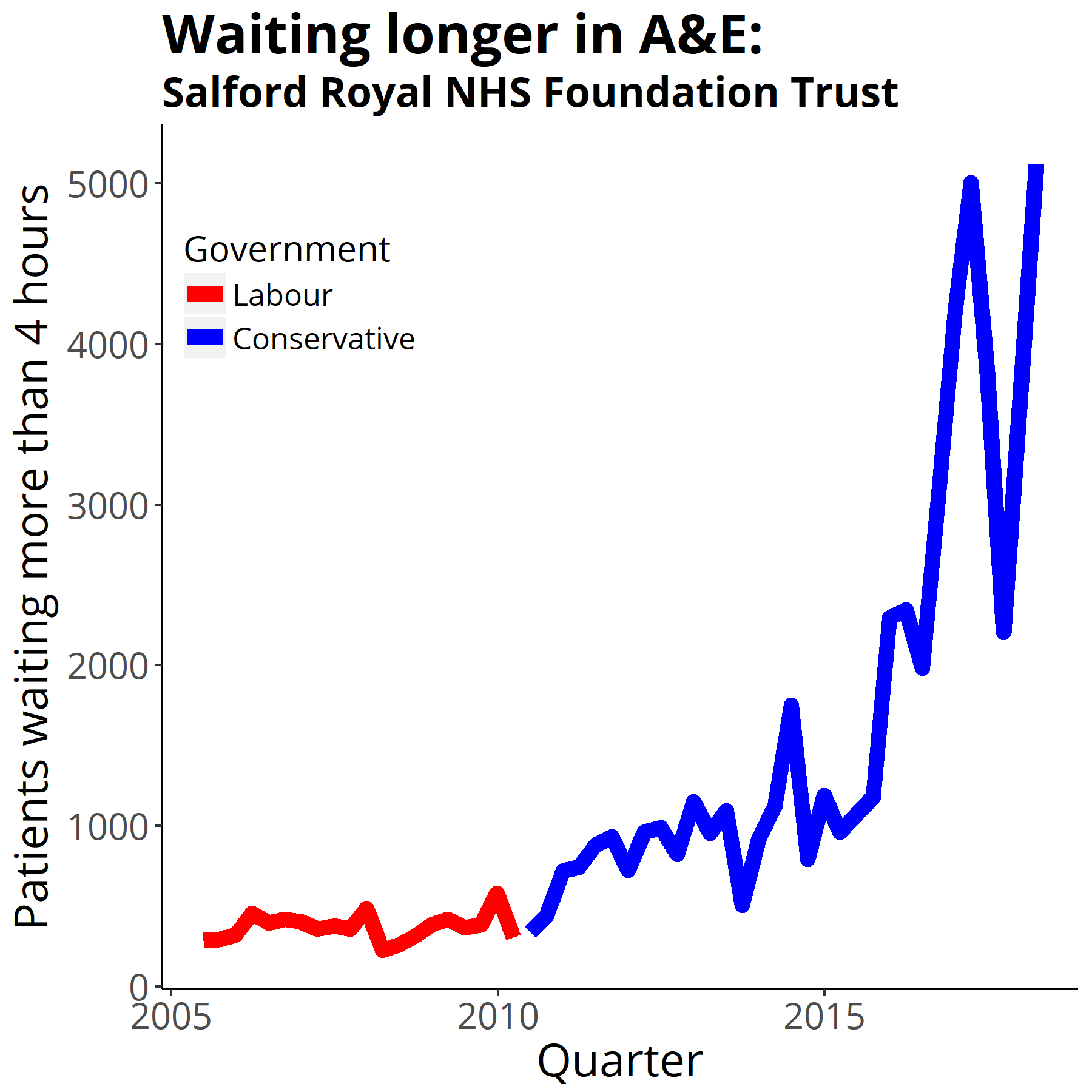
Four-hour target in the emergency department quarterly figures from NHS England Data from https://www.england.nhs.uk/statistics/statistical-work-areas/ae-waiting-times-and-activity/

In the same year it was named by the Health Service Journal as one of the top hundred NHS trusts to work for. At that time it had 6,219 full-time equivalent staff and a sickness absence rate of 4.42%. 87% of staff recommend it as a place for treatment and 71% recommended it as a place to work. After an inspection in August 2015 the trust was one of only three in England rated "outstanding" by the Care Quality Commission. It was rated as having the highest index of digital maturity of any organisation in the English NHS in April 2016.

== See also ==
- Healthcare in Greater Manchester
- Manchester Medical School
- List of hospitals in England
- List of NHS trusts
