= Spanish Flu: The Forgotten Fallen =

2009 British television film

- Genre: Historical drama
- Written by: Peter Harness
- Story by: Peter Guinness
- Directed by: Justin Hardy
- Starring: Bill Paterson; Mark Gatiss; Kenneth Cranham; Charlotte Riley
- Country of origin: United Kingdom
- Original language: English

Production
- Executive producer: Patrick Spence
- Producer: Susan Horth
- Cinematography: Douglas Hartington
- Editor: Alastair Reid
- Running time: 60 minutes
- Production companies: Hardy Pictures; Hardy and Sons

Original release
- Network: BBC Four
- Release: 5 August 2009

Spanish Flu: The Forgotten Fallen is a 2009 television drama. It is a dramatization of Dr James Niven's attempts to deal with the Spanish flu, a 1918-1920 flu pandemic, in Manchester. It was written by Peter Harness and it starred Bill Paterson as Niven, along with Mark Gatiss, Kenneth Cranham and Charlotte Riley. It was first broadcast on BBC Four on 5 August 2009.

== Plot ==
As millions of soldiers return home from the First World War, a new disease begins to sweep through Britain. Focusing on an outbreak in Manchester, its Medical Officer of Health James Niven struggles to combat the pandemic as the public, for various reasons, fail to take action.

== Cast ==
- Bill Paterson as Dr James Niven
- Mark Gatiss as Ernest Dunks
- Charlotte Riley as Peggy Lytton
- Kenneth Cranham as MJ O'Loughlin

== Reception ==
The series was broadcast around the time of the 2009 swine flu pandemic, which several reviews noted the timeliness of. Tim Teeman of The Times called it 'brilliantly acted and written'.
