= Hugh Park =

British judge (1910–2001)

Sir Hugh Eames Park (24 April 1910 – 24 January 2001) was a British judge of the High Court in the Probate, Divorce and Admiralty Division and the Queen's Bench Division. In 1976, he was the judge in the trial that convicted Stefan Kiszko of the murder of Lesley Molseed. The case has been called one of the greatest miscarriages of justice in the history of the British legal profession.

== Early life ==
Hugh Park was born in Pinhoe, Devon, near Exeter and educated at Blundell's School and Sidney Sussex College, Cambridge, where he excelled at hockey, rugby and rowing.

Park subsequently taught at St Dunstan's prep school in Burnham-on-Sea, Somerset, before reading for the Bar. He was called by Middle Temple in 1936, and began practising in general common law on the Western Circuit from chambers in Middle Temple. He was appointed Queen's Counsel in 1960.

== World War II ==
Park served in the Royal Air Force during the Second World War and was seconded to SOE in 1942. As part of his duties he debriefed Odette Sansom and after the war he acted in her divorce so that she could marry Peter Churchill.

== Legal career ==
Park's legal appointments included:

- Queen's Counsel, 1960
- Recorder of Penzance, 1959–1960
- Recorder of Exeter, 1960–1964
- Recorder of Southampton, 1964–1965
- Judge of the Family Division of the High Court, 1965–1973
- Judge of the Courts of Appeal, Channel Islands, 1964–65
- Chairman of Devon Quarter Sessions, 1964–71
- Judge of the High Court of Justice, 1973–1985
- Presiding Judge on the Western Circuit, 1970–1975

== Notable cases ==
Park's notable cases include:

- Miles Giffard in the early 1950s: the accused had murdered his wealthy parents in their kitchen, placed their bodies in a wheelbarrow, wheeled them to the cliff edge, and tipped them down into the sea. The man was sentenced to death, despite a plea by the defence that he was insane. Although not contemporaries, both Giffard and Park were educated at Blundell's School.
- Stefan Kiszko in 1976 for the Murder of Lesley Molseed: the tax clerk from Rochdale would serve 16 years in prison because scientific evidence proving his innocence was suppressed by West Yorkshire Police. On Kiszko's release in February 1992, a Conservative MP called the original trial one of the "greatest miscarriages of justice" of all time. Park himself said that he was sorry for the miscarriage of justice, but not for how he conducted the trial and wrote to Kiszko expressing his sorrow for his wrongful conviction.
- Dracula attacker in 1977: a 52-year-old man was jailed by Park for eight years for a "Dracula-like" sexual attack on a housewife. The man was identified by the teeth marks he left on his victim's bottom.
- LSD case at Bristol Crown Court in 1978 following "Operation Julie" involving police officers – one of them named Julie – posing as hippies in the Welsh hills and London council estates. The 15 defendants, including two highly qualified chemists, two doctors of medicine, a teacher, and the American author David Solomon – a friend of the drugs guru Timothy Leary, were jailed by Park for a total of 120 years for their part in one of the biggest LSD rings ever uncovered.
- Fowzi Nejad in 1981, the sole terrorist survivor of the Iranian Embassy Siege.

== Personal life ==
Park married Beryl Josephine Coombe in 1938 and had three daughters. He was knighted in 1965. He died at his home on 24 January 2001.
