= Stepping Hill Hospital =

- Stockport NHS Foundation Trust
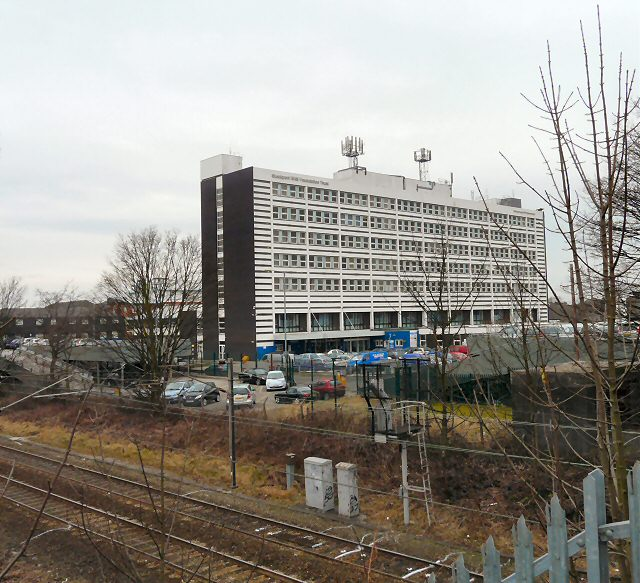
- Hospital viewed from the railway bridge on Bramhall Moor Lane in 2010

- Shown in Greater Manchester

Geography
- Location: Stockport, Greater Manchester, England
- Coordinates: 53.383901°N 2.131836°W

Organisation
- Care system: NHS
- Type: District General Hospital

Services
- Emergency department: Yes
- Beds: 778

History
- Founded: 1905

Links
- Website: stockport.nhs.uk
- Lists: Hospitals in England

Stepping Hill Hospital is in Stockport, Greater Manchester, England. It is managed by Stockport NHS Foundation Trust.

== History ==
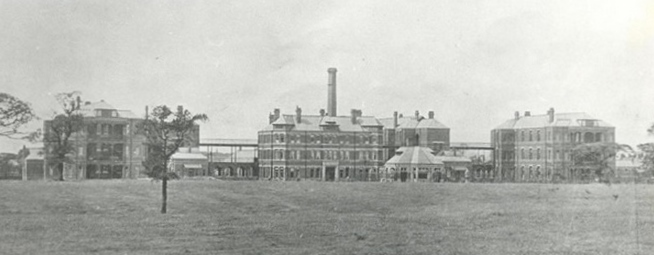
The hospital in 1908, a few years after opening

The facility was established as the Stepping Hill Poor Law Hospital in 1905. It became a military hospital during the First World War and joined the National Health Service (NHS) as the Stepping Hill Municipal Hospital in 1948.

In a poisoning incident which began in 2011, three patients were found to have been unlawfully killed at the hospital. The United Kingdom's first prostate cancer operation using a hand-held robot was undertaken at the hospital in 2012.

A new medical and surgical centre built at a cost of £20 million was officially opened by the Duchess of Gloucester in 2017.

The hospital's older buildings are decaying and prone to rainwater leaks. In November 2023, one of the outpatient units had to be closed as unsafe. In March 2024, ceiling collapses on consecutive days required closure of the radiography and critical care units. Stockport NHS Foundation Trust wishes to replace the aging buildings but the hospital was not selected for the government's new hospitals programme.

== Notable births ==
Claire Foy, the Golden Globe Award winning actress and star of Netflix series The Crown and the BBC miniseries Wolf Hall, was born at the hospital in 1984 and England under-21 footballer Tom Ince was born at the hospital in 1992.

== See also ==
- Healthcare in Greater Manchester
- List of hospitals in England
