= Hope Citadel Healthcare =

British community interest company

Hope Citadel Healthcare CIC is a Community interest company based in Greater Manchester.

Founded in 2009, it runs primary care doctors practices in Oldham, Rochdale and Manchester on APMS contracts. When it was established it was criticised at the 2009 national Local Medical Committees conference because its website makes it plain that the organisation is a specifically Christian organisation. It aimed to provide spiritual care and health care ‘alongside and in conjunction with clinical care', to take into account ‘spiritual aspects' of wellbeing and to take ‘every opportunity' for spiritual development. While this was said to contravene a fundamental principle of the NHS the same article also states that such concerns were unfounded.

It runs Hill Top Surgery, Hollinwood Medical Practice, John Street Medical Practice, and The Village Surgery all in Oldham, Middleton Health Centre, Birtle View Medical Practice, Kirkholt Medical Practice, and The Kingsway Practice all around the Rochdale area, and Hawthorn Medical Centre in Levenshulme. Three of these practices have been rated outstanding by the Care Quality Commission. According to Dr Steve Field "The Hill Top Surgery is one of the most inspirational GP surgeries that I have visited. It implemented suggestions for improvements from patients and from the patient participation group.

It pioneered the 'Focused Care Practitioner' role to fill in the gaps between health and social care, a scheme now working across Greater Manchester at various practices. Dr John Patterson, medical director, told The Guardian “In areas of deprivation you need more multifactorial medicine and psychosocial support.”

It took over the Sunvalley Medical Practice, based at Glodwick Primary Care Centre which was in special measures. In 2022 it was ranked "good" by the Care Quality Commission. It was praised for its community outreach work during the COVID-19 pandemic in England.
