= Ribera Salud =

Spanish healthcare provider

Ribera Salud is a healthcare provider based in Valencia.

It was originally awarded the contract to the Hospital de la Ribera in Alzira, Valencia under a Private Finance Initiative scheme in 1999. In 2003, the contract was extended to include primary care (including mental health and home care). It developed a unified IT system across all services for further integration. The model has become known as the Alzira model and is recognised as a case study for successful integration of healthcare.

Ribera Salud has since expanded to operate similar models in Torrevieja (starting in 2006), Denia (2008), Manises (2009), Elche (2010) and Torrejón (2011).

On June 28, 2019, Centene purchased an additional stake in Ribera Salud moving its 50% ownership to 90%,, with Banco Sabadell holding 10%.

In 2022, Ribera Salud begins a new stage with Vivalto Santé, the third French private healthcare group.
