= Sectra AB =

Swedish company, known for RAKEL

- Company type: Aktiebolag
- Traded as: Nasdaq Stockholm: SECT B
- Industry: Healthcare IT; Secured Communications
- Headquarters: Linköping, Sweden
- Website: sectra.com

Sectra AB is a Swedish company founded in 1978 active within medical technology and encrypted communication systems. Notable products include the communication system RAKEL which is used by Swedish organisations and institutions that provide vital public services such as emergency services and public utility providers like power companies.

During the fiscal year 2019/2020 the company had a net revenue of 1 661 million SEK, an operating profit of 295 million SEK and 859 employees. The company is publicly registered on Nasdaq, OMX Stockholm.

The company originated from Linköping, Sweden, where their headquarters are located. It is one of the larger technology companies in the city and has close connections to Linköping University where the company was started.

In November 2019 the company was named as the preferred supplier for a ten-year radiology contract for a picture archiving and communications system with eight NHS trusts in Greater Manchester.
