= Peter Taylor, Baron Taylor of Gosforth =

English jurist, judge, and nobleman (1930–1997)

The Right Honourable The Lord Taylor of Gosforth PC
- Portrait by Nick Sinclair, 1993

Lord Chief Justice of England
- In office 27 April 1992 – 4 June 1996
- Preceded by: The Lord Lane
- Succeeded by: The Lord Bingham of Cornhill

Lord Justice of Appeal
- In office 1988–1992

Personal details
- Born: Peter Murray Taylor; 1 May 1930 Newcastle upon Tyne, England
- Died: 28 April 1997 (aged 66) Guildford, England
- Spouse: Irene Harris Taylor (m. 1956–1995; her death)
- Relations: Gwyneth Paltrow (distant cousin)
- Children: Ruth Taylor; Deborah Taylor; Judith Taylor; Louis Taylor
- Education: Royal Grammar School, Newcastle
- Alma mater: Pembroke College, Cambridge

Peter Murray Taylor, Baron Taylor of Gosforth, PC (1 May 1930 – 28 April 1997) was the Lord Chief Justice of England from 1992 until 1996.

== Family ==
Taylor came from a Yiddish-speaking Jewish parents of Lithuanian descent, Herman Louis Taylor, a doctor, and Raie Helena Taylor (née Shockett). The original family surname was reportedly Teiger or Teicher. His father was born in Leeds; his mother came from the rabbinical Palterovich family who had emigrated to Leeds in 1895. Taylor had a brother, Arthur, and a sister, Dorothy. By the time of his birth, the family lived in Newcastle upon Tyne. Taylor passed the 11-plus and attended the Royal Grammar School. During World War II, Newcastle was subject to bombing raids and Taylor was evacuated to Penrith where he lived in a house without either running water or mains electricity.

== Early career ==
In 1951, Taylor won an exhibition to Pembroke College, Cambridge, to study law. He was also a talented pianist, continuing to play for the whole of his life. He graduated in 1953 with an upper second class degree and then read for the Bar, being called in 1954. He chose to practise on the north-eastern circuit around Newcastle and joined the chambers of Norman Harper. He conducted mainly criminal cases, often for the prosecution, and at a very early age 'took silk' to become a Queen's Counsel in 1967; he occasionally appeared for the defence. On one such occasion, judge Sir Melford Stevenson deemed him a threat to the administration of justice.

== Famous cases ==
Taylor attracted attention from 1973 when he appeared for the prosecution in several cases connected to the corrupt architect John Poulson, including that of Poulson himself. Over the next three years, the prosecutions succeeded and many of those involved were jailed. In 1974, Taylor successfully prosecuted Judith Ward who was convicted of a series of IRA bombings (many years later, the conviction was found to have been a miscarriage of justice, mostly through Ward's delusions of her own guilt). He also prosecuted Stefan Kiszko in July 1976, in what would become one of the most notorious miscarriages of justice in British Law in the 20th Century. Taylor also took on John Ryman, a fellow Barrister and Labour Member of Parliament for Blyth Valley who was found to have submitted fraudulent election expenses.

The most high-profile trial in which Taylor appeared took place in 1979 and the defendant was former Liberal Party leader Jeremy Thorpe who was accused of conspiracy to murder. Although all involved were acquitted, most observers put this down to the summing-up of the trial judge and the malpractice of the prosecution witnesses; Taylor won praise for his handling of the case. His opening address is frequently quoted; Taylor's style of oratory was deliberately concise and straightforward but he had a talent for a punning literary allusion.

== Judge ==
Taylor had been first appointed a recorder (part-time judge) in 1969 and served as a recorder in the Crown Court from 1972. After serving as Chairman of the Bar Council for 1979–80, he was made a full High Court judge in the Queen's Bench Division, receiving the customary knighthood. One of his first cases saw him give Bromley London Borough Council permission to challenge the Greater London Council's "Fare's Fair" policy of lowering public transport fares. In 1983, Taylor held that a Pakistani man who had pronounced Talaq and notified the authorities in Pakistan had not divorced his wife according to English law.

In 1984, Taylor largely sided with Mary Whitehouse who brought a case against the Independent Broadcasting Authority over the feature film version of Scum (1979); he said the Director-General of the IBA had made "a grave error of judgment" in allowing the film to be shown. The next year, he held that Nottinghamshire police had acted negligently in firing CS gas into a house knowing there would be a fire risk and not having fire engines on standby. In 1987 he stated that he did not accept that a judge could not inquire further when a minister raised a justification of 'national security' for their actions (the case concerned the telephone tapping of Joan Ruddock).

== Court of Appeal ==
In 1988, Taylor was promoted to the Court of Appeal. There he became known to the public on 17 April 1989 when he was commissioned by the government to undertake an inquiry into the Hillsborough disaster two days previously. The Taylor Report he produced led to the introduction of all-seater stadia at all top English football clubs, and the removal of fences around fans sitting areas. Standing accommodation was seen as a risk due to the increased chances of a "crush", and the security fences which Taylor describes as treating spectators like "prisoners of war" were also a hazard in crushes as they claimed the lives of most of the 96 people who ultimately lost their lives at Hillsborough; 94 of them died on the day of the disaster, a 95th died several days later, and the final victim died in March 1993 having never regained consciousness.

Taylor's recommendations, published on 29 January 1990, stated that all First and Second Division (which became the Premier League and Division One in 1992) stadiums had to be all-seater by August 1994, and that the rest of the Football League should follow suit by August 1999. However, the Football Association later ruled that the smaller clubs could retain standing accommodation provided that their stadiums met safety requirements, while clubs promoted to the upper reaches of the league would be allowed standing accommodation at their stadiums for up to three years after promotion.

Taylor's popularity as a former Chairman of the Bar Council and as a fair judge who could plausibly claim to have been in touch with all aspects of British life led to his being considered the favourite to take over from Lord Lane when Lane retired from the job of Lord Chief Justice, a retirement which seemed all the more likely due to the criticism of Lane for his stance on a succession of miscarriages of justice. Taylor was duly appointed when Lane stepped down in 1992, at the same time being created a life peer as Baron Taylor of Gosforth, of Embleton in the County of Northumberland on 27 April 1992.

== Lord Chief Justice ==
Where Lane had been extremely reticent about giving interviews, Taylor was determined to be as open as possible. Not only did he start his tenure by holding an unprecedented press conference, he appeared as a guest on BBC television's Question Time and as a castaway on Desert Island Discs. Within a few months of taking over he accepted an invitation to give the annual Dimbleby Lecture on "The judiciary in the nineties" in which he cast himself as a reformer. He supported moves to stop judges wearing wigs in court.

Unlike previous holders of the office, Taylor concentrated almost exclusively on appeals rather than acting as a trial judge. This was partly because a backlog had grown up but also because of the much increased concern over a series of cases going back many years which were being proved to be miscarriages of justice. Taylor differed from his immediate predecessor in considering this an immensely serious issue, and knew from his own experience of prosecuting Judith Ward and Stefan Kiszko that many more cases could come to light. This led him to strong support of the full disclosure of prosecution evidence (he also supported moves towards disclosure of defence evidence).

Taylor was with the grain of public opinion in supporting stronger sentences on drunk drivers who killed, and he also extended the range of defences available to domestic violence victims who fought back. He also extended the concept of murder to include the abortion of unborn children in their mother's womb. Due to his unusual openness, his view was often heard on matters of political controversy: he could live with the change to allow juries to draw adverse inferences from a defendant's silence when interviewed, but opposed moves restricting the right of an accused to elect trial by jury.

Taylor was profoundly affected by the death of his wife Irene in 1995. Shortly afterwards he was diagnosed with a brain tumour. The last appeal he heard was that of Rosemary West, which he turned down. He stepped down in 1996, although did not go quietly: in a series of speeches in the House of Lords over the next year he strongly attacked proposals from the then Home Secretary, Michael Howard, to introduce mandatory sentencing, which he said "must involve a denial of justice". Taylor had defended the traditional right of the defendant to silence, a battle ultimately lost, and criticised the delay in setting up a body to review miscarriages of justice, something recommended by the 1993 Royal Commission headed by Viscount Runciman of Doxford.

== Illness and death ==
Peter Taylor, Baron Taylor of Gosforth, died of cancer in 1997, aged 66, at his home in Guildford, Surrey. He was survived by three daughters: Ruth, Deborah and Judith; and a son, Louis.

Legal offices
Preceded by The Lord Lane	Lord Chief Justice of England; 1992–1996	Succeeded by The Lord Bingham of Cornhill
