= Northern Care Alliance NHS Foundation Trust =

NHS hospital trust

- Type: NHS foundation trust
- Established: 1 October 2021
- Headquarters: Salford, Greater Manchester, England
- Hospitals: Fairfield General Hospital; Rochdale Infirmary; Royal Oldham Hospital; Salford Royal Hospital
- Website: www.northerncarealliance.nhs.uk

The Northern Care Alliance NHS Foundation Trust (NCA) is an NHS foundation trust in Greater Manchester, England.

== History ==
It was created on 1 April 2017 by way of a formal partnership of two NHS Trusts - Salford Royal NHS Foundation Trust and The Pennine Acute Hospitals NHS Trust. David Dalton led the development.

The NCA launched as a multi-site group model under the leadership of Dalton, initially providing healthcare services from six hospitals - Salford Royal, the Royal Oldham Hospital, Fairfield General Hospital, Rochdale Infirmary and North Manchester General Hospital - as well as outlying community facilities. At the time of its launch it had 2,000 hospital beds and over 17,000 staff, and served a population of over 1 million.

On 1 April 2020, North Manchester General Hospital joined the Manchester University NHS Foundation Trust (MFT) under a management agreement, and was expected to formally leave the NCA in October 2020.

Owen Williams, who is chair of NHS England's Health Inequalities Expert Advisory Group, is the Chief Executive.

== COVID-19 pandemic ==
In December 2021, the trust planned to open virtual wards which would to reduce hospital occupancy to deal with the COVID-19 pandemic in England. At that point, the number of patients in A&E breaching the 12 hour target had gone from 250 in September to 267 in October, a sharp rise from 18 in April.

In January 2022, the trust, together with Bolton NHS Foundation Trust was the worst hit by Covid hospital admissions in England. In June 2022, it announced plans to set up a 500-bed virtual ward using Dignio technology for patients with a variety of different conditions. Patients will use the MyDignio App to record their vital signs.

== See also ==
- Healthcare in Greater Manchester
- Manchester University NHS Foundation Trust
