= Fairfield General Hospital =

- Northern Care Alliance NHS Foundation Trust
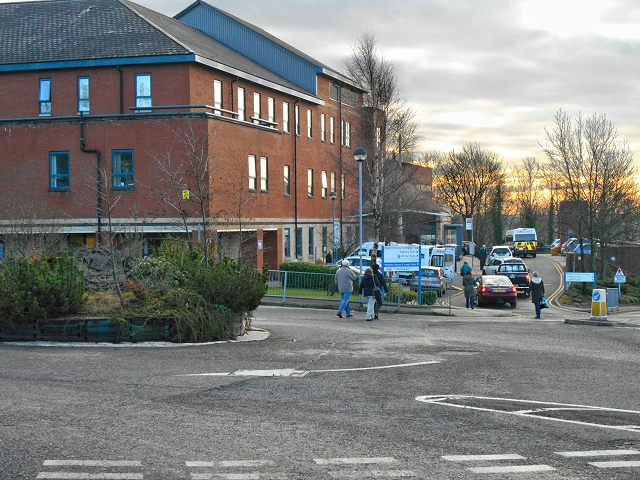
- Fairfield General Hospital

- Shown in Greater Manchester

Geography
- Location: Bury, Greater Manchester, England
- Coordinates: 53°36′N 2°16′W

Organisation
- Care system: National Health Service
- Type: District General

Services
- Emergency department: Yes

History
- Founded: 1905

Fairfield General Hospital is a hospital in Bury, Greater Manchester. It is managed by the Northern Care Alliance NHS Foundation Trust.

== History ==
The hospital has its origins in the Bury Union Workhouse Infirmary which was completed in 1905. The facility became known as the Jericho Hospital in the 1930s and joined the National Health Service as the Fairfield General Hospital in 1948. The hospital was modernised in the 1970s and, following the closure of Bury General Hospital off Walmersley Road in 2007, all services transferred to expanded facilities at Fairfield General Hospital.

== Services ==
There is an accident and emergency department.
