= Geoffrey Lane, Baron Lane =

British judge (1918–2005)

The Right Honourable The Lord Lane AFC PC
- Lane in 1982, painted by George JD Bruce

Lord Chief Justice of England
- In office 15 April 1980 – 27 April 1992
- Preceded by: The Lord Widgery
- Succeeded by: The Lord Taylor of Gosforth

Lord of Appeal in Ordinary
- In office 1979–1980

Lord Justice of Appeal
- In office 1974–1979
- Preceded by: Sir Arthian Davies
- Succeeded by: Sir John Donaldson

Justice of the High Court
- In office 1969–1974

Member of the House of Lords
- Lord Temporal
- Lord of Appeal in Ordinary; 28 September 1979 – 22 August 2005

Personal details
- Born: Geoffrey Dawson Lane; 17 July 1918 Derby
- Died: 22 August 2005 (aged 87)
- Resting place: St Ippolyts, Hertfordshire
- Education: Shrewsbury School
- Alma mater: Trinity College, Cambridge

Military service
- Allegiance: United Kingdom
- Branch/service: Royal Air Force
- Rank: Squadron Leader
- Battles/wars: D-Day; Operation Market Garden
- Awards: Air Force Cross

Geoffrey Dawson Lane, Baron Lane, AFC, PC (17 July 1918 – 22 August 2005) was a British barrister and judge who served as Lord Chief Justice of England from 1980 to 1992, having previously served as a Lord of Appeal in Ordinary from 1977 until 1980.

The son of a bank manager, Lane was educated at Shrewsbury School and Trinity College, Cambridge. During the Second World War, he served as a pilot in the Royal Air Force, for which he received the Air Force Cross. Called to the English bar in 1946, he practiced with great success, prosecuted in several high-profile criminal cases, and took silk in 1962. He was appointed to the High Court in 1969, sitting in the Queen's Bench Division, was promoted to the Court of Appeal in 1974 and to the House of Lords in 1977. The next year, after only six months in office, he was appointed Lord Chief Justice of England, serving until his retirement in 1992. A private man, Lane never gave interviews and kept a low public profile until his death in 2005.

The later part of his term was marred by a succession of disputed convictions, though Lane remained highly regarded by his colleagues and the legal profession. Lane's critics claimed that his refusal to believe that police evidence could be institutionally corrupt, and his reluctance to overturn the verdict of a jury, "represented a dangerous hindrance to justice". His failure to allow the appeal of the Birmingham Six in 1988 led to calls for his resignation following their successful appeal in 1991; an editorial in The Times "urged him to go", while 140 members of parliament signed a House of Commons motion to that effect. On his death, the barrister Sir Louis Blom-Cooper declared that "by common consent of the legal profession, Lane was a very great Lord Chief Justice of England and Wales".

== Early life ==
The son of a bank manager, Geoffrey Lane was born in Derby. He attended Shrewsbury School and Trinity College, Cambridge where he took Firsts in Part I of the Classical Tripos before the Second World War and both parts of the Law Tripos after he was demobilized. During the war, he served as a pilot in the Royal Air Force. Initially, he flew Wellington Bombers for 104 Squadron, before being promoted to squadron leader to command 233 Squadron, which flew Dakota transport aircraft in D-Day and Operation Market Garden. He was awarded the Air Force Cross in 1943.

== Legal career ==
Lane was called to the bar at Gray's Inn in 1946. He specialised in criminal prosecutions on the Midland and Oxford circuit, and took silk in 1962. He prosecuted some of the Great Train robbers and the murderer James Hanratty in the same year, and was appointed as Recorder of Bedford in 1963.

While appearing for the defendant in the case of R v Morris, he made a much-cited statement as to what constituted 'common purpose' for the criminal law, which Lord Parker of Waddington CJ adopted:

"where two persons embark on a joint enterprise, each is liable for the acts done in pursuance of that joint enterprise, that that includes liability for unusual consequences if they arise from the execution of the agreed joint enterprise but (and this is the crux of the matter) that, if one of the adventurers goes beyond what had been tacitly agreed as part of the common enterprise, his co-adventurer is not liable for the consequences of that unauthorised act. Finally, he says it is for the jury in every case to decide whether what was done was part of the joint enterprise, or went beyond it and was in fact an act unauthorised by that joint enterprise."

He is also famous for his quote: "Loss of freedom seldom happens overnight. Oppression doesn't stand on the doorstep with toothbrush moustache and swastika armband – it creeps up insidiously... step by step, and all of a sudden the unfortunate citizen realizes that it is gone."

== Judicial office ==
=== High Court ===
Later in 1966, Lane was appointed a Justice of the High Court, assigned to the Queen's Bench Division, receiving the customary knighthood. He was elected a Bencher at Gray's Inn the same year.

He delivered some notable judgments: in 1968, he awarded damages against a school for a pupil who had been injured in 'horseplay' between his peers, saying that the school had a responsibility to stop it from getting out of hand; and while acting as an appeal judge, he found for the publishers of Last Exit to Brooklyn who had been convicted of publishing an obscene book, because of faults in the trial judge's summing-up. He was chosen to head the inquiry into the Staines air disaster in 1972, and concluded that the underlying cause was an undiagnosed heart condition of the pilot which impaired his judgement, coupled with the pilot's known bad temper which led to his junior crew being unwilling to challenge him.

=== Court of Appeal and House of Lords ===
Lane was made a Lord Justice of Appeal in 1974. He was one of the appeal judges in Tameside Metropolitan Borough Council's appeal to keep its grammar schools rather than be forced by the government to adopt a comprehensive system, and joined in the judgment that found for Tameside and brought a halt to comprehensivisation. Lane's judgment was personally critical of Fred Mulley, the Secretary of State for Education and Science for being "far from frank" about his reason for intervening in Tameside.

In another high-profile case in 1977, Lane joined in dismissing an appeal against deportation from Mark Hosenball, an American journalist working for the Evening Standard. In 1978, Lane found for the Labour Party and against its dissident members (Paul McCormick and Julian Lewis) who tried to win control of Newham North East Constituency Labour Party from the party's National Executive.

Lane became a Lord of Appeal in Ordinary on 28 September 1979, receiving as a law lord additionally a life peerage as Baron Lane, of St Ippollitts in the County of Hertfordshire. He had been appointed by the new Lord Chancellor, Lord Hailsham, soon after Margaret Thatcher won the 1979 general election. The overdue retirement of Lord Widgery, whose physical ill-health and increasing dementia had become a suppressed scandal, led to Hailsham picking Lane to follow him as Lord Chief Justice from 1980. His return to the Court of Appeal was welcomed in the legal profession, where Lane was regarded as a genial figure ("Geoffrey Dawson, Baron Lane. Good to have you back again."), but eventually not welcomed by Lane himself, who disliked the work.

=== Lord Chief Justice ===
Shortly after taking over as Lord Chief Justice, Lane attracted political controversy when he called for a general reduction in prison terms. His appeal judgments frequently cut the length of sentences and he was known to be a member of the Prison Reform Trust. He had served as deputy chairman of the Parole Board from 1970 to 1972. After the publication of lengthy interviews with members of the jury in the trial of Jeremy Thorpe, Lane supported moves (later made in the Contempt of Court Act 1981) to ban any publication of reports from within the jury room. Lane also opposed the proposal to extend rights of audience in the higher courts to solicitors.

One of the areas of crime in which Lane did not support shorter sentences was rape. In 1982, Lane stated that sentences for rape should include immediate prison time, except in the most exceptional circumstances, which was taken as an implied rebuke for a Judge who had attracted controversy for fining a rapist £2,000 and saying that the victim was "guilty of a great deal of contributory negligence". Lane made it clear he rejected the general concept that victims of rape could have given their attackers an excuse. Much later in his career, Lane was responsible for a judgment in the case of R v R which for the first time held that a husband could be guilty of raping his wife, overturning the irrebuttable presumption at common law that a wife consented to sex with her husband.

Many observers regarded Lane as a defender of traditional 'Victorian' morality rather than a supporter of mild feminism. In 1983, he gave the Darwin Lecture at Cambridge, in which he stated that he believed that the word "gay" should not be used to mean homosexual, and that instead the term should be "homosexuals, and/or buggers".

== Disputed convictions ==
Lane had an early introduction to controversies and disputed convictions when, in 1962, he was the junior Crown counsel in the trial of James Hanratty for the A6 murder. Hanratty was hanged but disputes over whether he was properly convicted have continued to this day. He also represented the Metropolitan Police at the Brabin inquiry into the conviction and subsequent hanging of Timothy Evans for the murders at 10 Rillington Place in 1950. From the mid-1980s, concern grew. On 5 December 1985, Lane quashed the conviction of Anthony Mycock who had been convicted of a robbery which the BBC television programme Rough Justice argued had never occurred. In his judgment, Lane asserted that there had been a robbery and criticised the programme for "outrageous" interview methods. He regarded such programmes as "mere entertainment".

When the Birmingham Six were granted permission to appeal in 1987, Lane presided over what was (at six weeks) the longest criminal appeal in English legal history. The judgment, given on 28 January 1988, adopted all the key parts of the Crown case, dismissed defence witnesses as unreliable, and upheld the convictions. Lane concluded by sending a message to the Home Secretary: "As has happened before in References by the Home Secretary to this court, the longer this hearing has gone on the more convinced this court has become that the verdict of the jury was correct." This implied rebuke and invitation not to refer any more questioned cases was criticised by campaigners. Lane initially refused leave to appeal to Winston Silcott, convicted of the murder of Keith Blakelock in the midst of a strong campaign of vilification from tabloid newspapers. In his findings he concluded that there was "no lurking doubt" in spite of the flimsiness of the prosecution case. Silcott's conviction for the Blakelock murder was ultimately quashed in 1991.

Unfortunately for Lane, in 1989, the appeal of the Guildford Four proved police malpractice conclusively. In this case, Lane overturned the convictions. One observer described his appearance: "The Lord Chief Justice seemed to sniff something nasty in the air. Peering out over half-moon spectacles, Lord Lane's weary face was the mask of Justice embarrassed." Lane refused to free Paul Hill, one of the Four, because of a separate conviction for murder in Northern Ireland, although this later turned out also to have been a wrongful conviction.

The Birmingham Six were granted a further appeal (their third) in 1991, when more evidence established that the police evidence at their trial had been fabricated. The Director of Public Prosecutions announced before the appeal was held that he no longer considered their convictions safe and satisfactory. Lane did not preside over the appeal which formally cleared them. Their successful appeal led to calls for Lane to resign, including a hostile editorial in The Times and a motion in the House of Commons signed by 140 members of parliament. These, and other cases where convictions were overturned, blighted the end of Lane's tenure as Lord Chief Justice.

== Retirement ==
Despite previous thoughts that he would resign before the end of his time to enjoy an active retirement, Lane stayed in office until 1992. Despite remaining in office after the Birmingham Six were released, he nevertheless resigned over a year before he would have been forced to retire at the age of 75. He headed a commission in 1993 which recommended the end of the mandatory life sentence for murder, but otherwise kept a low profile (he never gave press interviews while in office and did not change that policy in his retirement).

He died in 2005 and was buried in the churchyard at St Ippolyts, near Hitchin in Hertfordshire.

Legal offices
Preceded by The Lord Widgery	Lord Chief Justice; 1980–1992	Succeeded by The Lord Taylor of Gosforth
