= Salford Royal Hospital =

- Northern Care Alliance NHS Foundation Trust
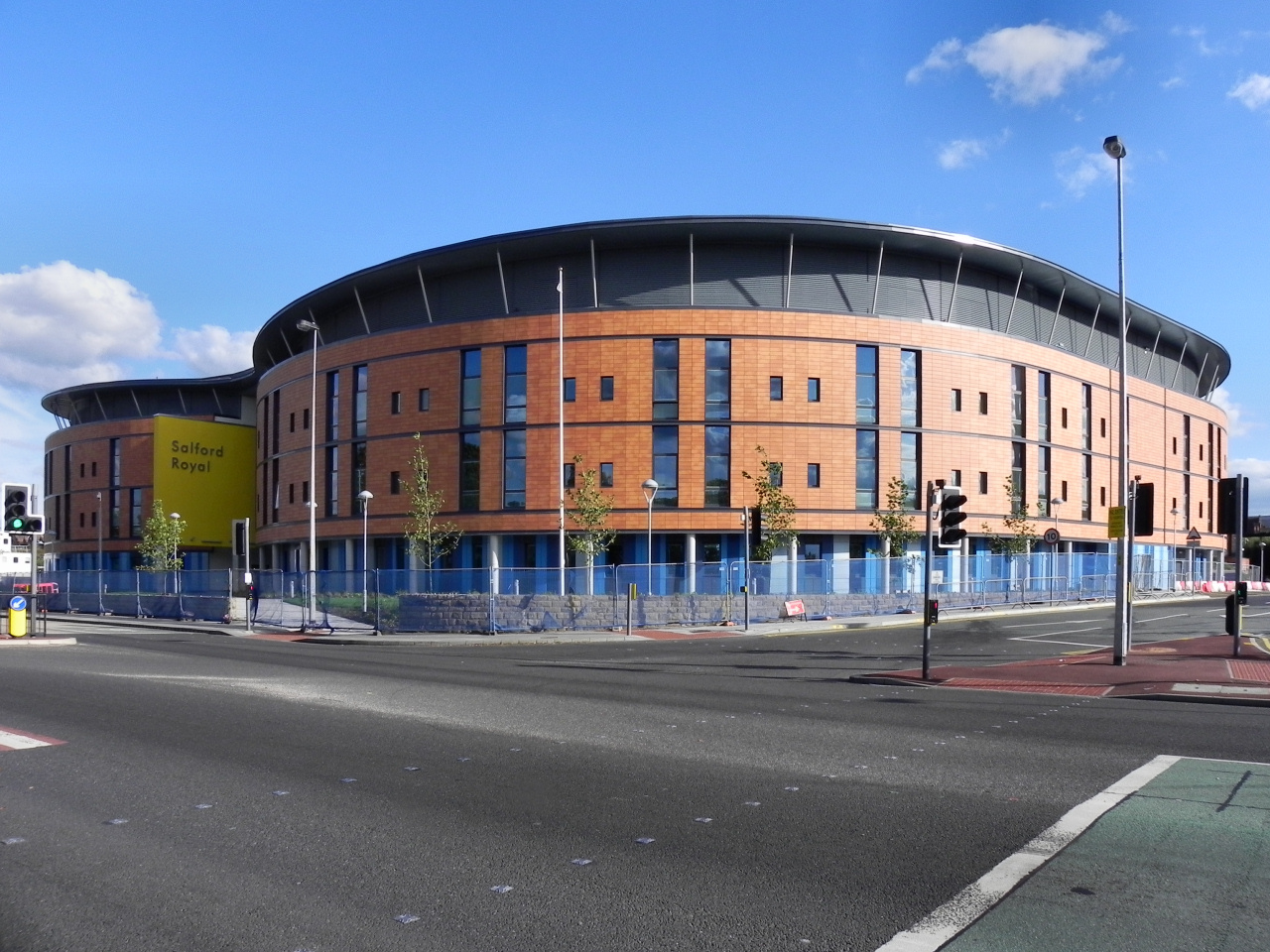
- Hope Building, Salford Royal Hospital

- Location within Greater Manchester

Geography
- Location: Salford, England, United Kingdom
- Coordinates: 53.48807°N 2.32139°W

Organisation
- Care system: Public NHS
- Type: Teaching
- Affiliated university: University of Manchester; University of Salford

Services
- Emergency department: Major trauma centre
- Beds: 728

History
- Founded: 1882

Links
- Lists: Hospitals in England

Salford Royal Hospital (formerly known as Hope Hospital) is a large university teaching hospital in the metropolitan borough of Salford, England operated by Northern Care Alliance NHS Foundation Trust. It was previously one of the top-performing hospitals in the United Kingdom.

== History ==
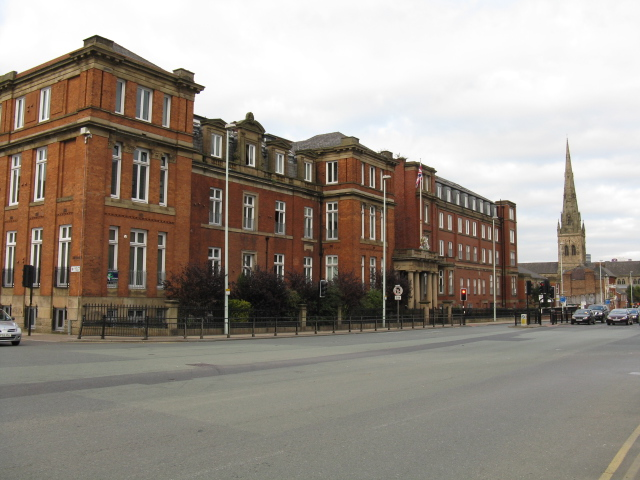
The former Salford Royal Hospital in Chapel Street (now luxury flats)

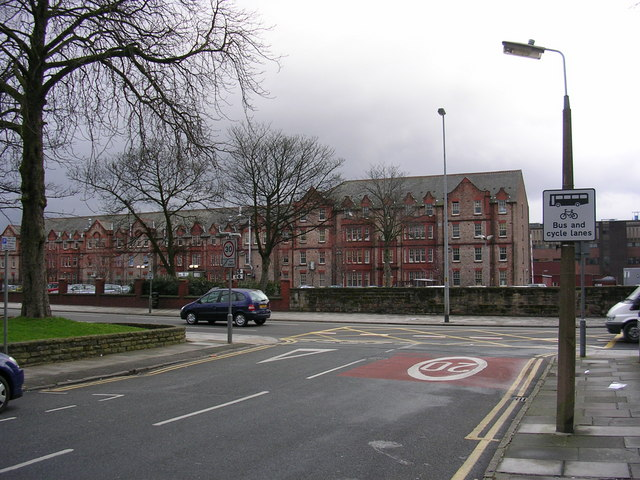
The Clinical Sciences Building, at the former Hope Hospital in Eccles Old Road. The taller block on the right has since been demolished.

The original hospital in Salford was established in Chapel Street in 1827 and was known as the Salford and Pendleton Dispensary. It became the Salford and Pendleton Royal Hospital and Dispensary in 1847 and the Salford Royal Hospital in the 1870s.

In June 1941, during the Manchester Blitz, the hospital on Chapel Street was struck by German bombs and 14 nurses died. Following the formation of the NHS Trust in 1990 and budget cuts imposed by the Government in the early 1990s, the hospital on Chapel Street closed in 1994 and was converted into luxury flats. A memorial stone tablet to commemorate the nurses killed during the Blitz remains above the original Chapel Street entrance.

Meanwhile, the original hospital in Hope, which was built on the south side of Eccles Road between 1880 and 1882 to accommodate sick paupers working at the local workhouse, was known as the Salford Union Infirmary. The hospital became known as Hope Hospital, taking the name of the medieval Hope Hall, which had been demolished in 1956. A redevelopment scheme for Hope Hospital was procured under a Private Finance Initiative contract in 2007. The construction work, which was designed by Ryder / HKS and carried out by Balfour Beatty at a cost of £136 million, was completed in 2012. The hospital at Hope was rebranded as the Salford Royal Hospital during the redevelopment.

In January 2018, it was announced that a major trauma centre, complete with a rooftop helipad, would be built at the Salford Royal Hospital at a cost of £48 million. It is intended that 90 per cent of all major trauma patients in the Greater Manchester area will be treated there once it is completed. It was previously one of the top-performing hospitals in the United Kingdom but is now rated as "Requires Improvement" in the latest inspection by the Care Quality Commission and the first inspection since joining the Northern Care Alliance group.

== Notable staff ==
- Mildred Alice Nodal RRC (1861–1947), matron from 1907 to 1924. Nodal trained at The London Hospital under Eva Luckes between 1892 and 1894.

== See also ==
- Healthcare in Greater Manchester
- Manchester Medical School
- List of hospitals in England
