= Rochdale Infirmary =

Hospital in Greater Manchester, England

- Northern Care Alliance NHS Foundation Trust
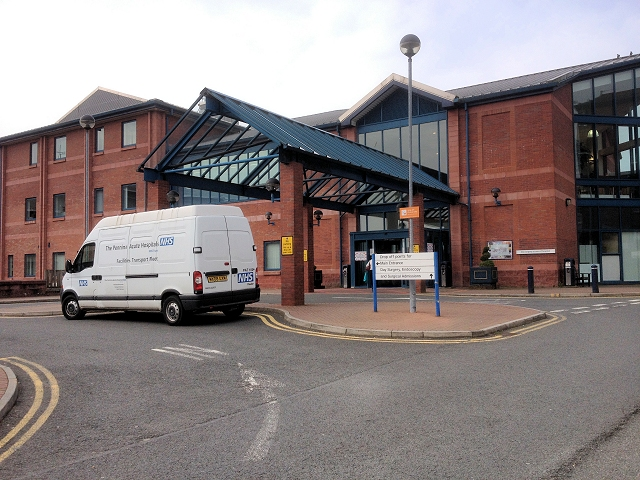
- Main Entrance, Rochdale Infirmary

- Shown in Greater Manchester

Geography
- Location: Rochdale, Greater Manchester, England, United Kingdom
- Coordinates: 53.6235°N 2.1598°W

Organisation
- Care system: Public NHS
- Type: District General

History
- Founded: 1832

Links
- Lists: Hospitals in England

Rochdale Infirmary is an acute general hospital in Rochdale, Greater Manchester, England. It is managed by the Northern Care Alliance NHS Foundation Trust.

== History ==
The infirmary was established as the Rochdale Infirmary and Dispensary by Clement Royds, a local banker, in South Parade in 1832. It moved to Lord Street a few months later.

A new purpose-built hospital was initiated following a donation by Thomas Watson, a local mill owner, and was opened by John Bright in Whitehall Street in 1883; it was expanded when a new wing was opened by King George V in July 1913. The facility joined the National Health Service as the Rochdale Infirmary in 1948.

In June 2011, maternity and inpatient children's services were transferred to Royal Oldham Hospital.
