= Royal Oldham Hospital =

- Northern Care Alliance NHS Foundation Trust
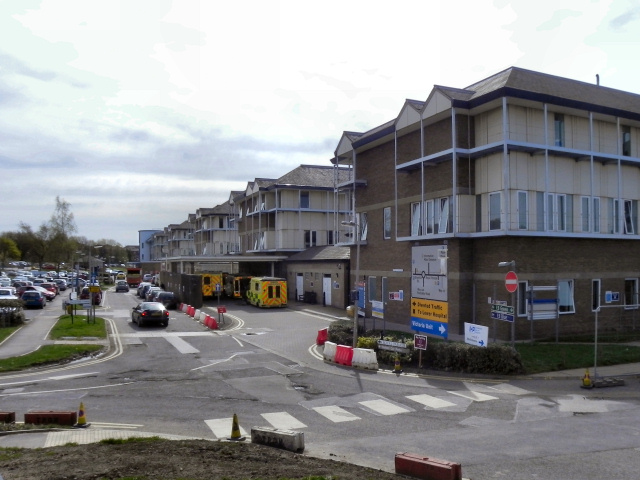
- Royal Oldham Hospital

- Shown in Greater Manchester

Geography
- Location: Oldham, Greater Manchester, England, United Kingdom
- Coordinates: 53.5528°N 2.1227°W

Organisation
- Care system: Public NHS

Services
- Emergency department: Yes Accident & Emergency
- Beds: 445

History
- Founded: c.1870 (as a workhouse infirmary)

Links
- Website: http://www.pat.nhs.uk
- Lists: Hospitals in England

The Royal Oldham Hospital is a NHS hospital in the Coldhurst area of Oldham, Greater Manchester, England. It is managed by the Northern Care Alliance NHS Foundation Trust. The hospital has its own volunteer-run radio station, Radio Cavell, which broadcasts at 1350 AM.

== History ==
The hospital has its origins in the workhouse infirmary established to support the Oldham Union Workhouse on the Rochdale Road in around 1870. It became the Boundary Park Hospital in the late 1920s and, after joining the National Health Service in 1948, it became Oldham and District General Hospital in 1955. In 1989 it was renamed the Royal Oldham Hospital.

In 1951 the obstetrician and gynaecologist Patrick Steptoe joined the hospital and Louise Brown, the world's first successful in vitro fertilised "test tube baby", was born there on 25 July 1978. The hospital was also the birthplace of English physicist Brian Cox, who is a professor of particle physics in the School of Physics and Astronomy at the University of Manchester; he was born in 1968.

In April 2018 the hospital joined the National Bereavement Care Pathway, which intends to ensure a common standard in bereavement care for parents.

== Radio Cavell ==
Radio Cavell, founded in 1952, provides a hospital radio service in the hospital.

== Notable people ==
- Louise Brown (born 1978), the first human born following conception by in vitro fertilisation (IVF), was born at the hospital.

== See also ==
- Westhulme Hospital
- List of hospitals in England
