= William Lawler =

William Lawler may refer to:

- William Lawler (farmer-politician)
- William Lawler, pathologist in Murder of Kelly Anne Bates and Murder of Suzanne Capper
- William Lawler v. Horace B Claflin, see List of United States Supreme Court cases, volume 63

== See also ==
- William Lawlor (disambiguation)
