= Murder of Suzanne Capper =

1992 murder in Manchester, England

Suzanne Capper
- Born: Suzanne Jane Jones; 1 September 1976; Manchester, England, UK
- Died: 18 December 1992 (aged 16); Withington Hospital, Manchester, England, UK
- Cause of death: Multiple organ dysfunction syndrome arising from burns
- Body discovered: Compstall Road
- Parent: Elizabeth Capper

The murder of Suzanne Capper was committed in Greater Manchester, England in December 1992. Capper, aged 16, died in Withington Hospital on 18 December 1992, from multiple organ failure arising from 80% burns after being deliberately lit on fire on 14 December. Before her death, Capper relayed that she had been kidnapped and held captive for seven days at a house in Moston, Manchester, where she was beaten and tortured. She was taken from the house by car, driven into the countryside and forced out of the car into a wood at Werneth Low where petrol was poured over her and she was set alight. The murder arose from the "avenging [of] trivial grievances: a sexual insult, infection with pubic lice and the loss of a pink duffel coat."

Detectives conducting the inquiry said that "for sheer mindless brutality" the crime ranked alongside the torture inflicted upon the victims of the Moors murderers. The case went to trial in November 1993 but received "comparatively little publicity" as it coincided with the trial of Robert Thompson and Jon Venables for the murder of James Bulger. On 17 December 1993, Jean Powell, aged 26; her ex-husband Glyn Powell, aged 29; and Bernadette McNeilly, aged 24, were sentenced to life imprisonment for their parts in the murder. Jeffrey Leigh, aged 27, was jailed for twelve years for false imprisonment. Jean Powell's brother Clifford Pook, aged 18, was sentenced to fifteen years in a Young Offenders' Institution for false imprisonment and conspiracy to cause grievous bodily harm. Anthony Michael Dudson, aged 16 at the time of the murder, was also found guilty of murder and sentenced to be detained at His Majesty's pleasure under section 53(1) of the Children and Young Persons Act 1933.

== Background ==
Suzanne Jane Capper, described as "a gentle and easily influenced girl," had been babysat by Jean Powell since she was six years old. In 1990 she had spent time in the care of the local authority after her mother, Elizabeth Capper, and her stepfather separated, after which Suzanne and her older sister, Michelle, stayed with their stepfather. Around this time Suzanne began to be truant from Moston Brook High School, and her attendance during the final two years of schooling was described as "erratic". She increasingly spent her time at Jean Powell's house.

Jean Powell lived at 97 Langworthy Road, Moston, a small Victorian terraced house, where she also dealt drugs and was involved in handling stolen cars. Michelle Capper had briefly lived with Jean Powell, but moved out in August 1992 because she did not like the "evil new friends" Powell was associating with, particularly Bernadette McNeilly, who had recently moved in three doors away at number 91. Bernadette, who had three children, subsequently moved in with Jean and her three children, where the two shared a bed in the downstairs dining room because the bedrooms were "full of children." Suzanne continued to stay regularly even though Jean and Bernadette frequently bullied her. Her sister said: "It was not that she was scared of them, it's just that she would do anything for them. She pampered their every whim."

Jean Powell was separated from her husband Glyn, although the two remained friendly and he would visit regularly from his nearby home. Bernadette McNeilly's boyfriend, 16-year-old Anthony Dudson, was also having a sexual relationship with Jean. Jean was also sexually involved with Jeffrey Leigh, a regular visitor to the house as a purchaser of amphetamines. Another frequent visitor to the house was Jean's younger brother, Clifford Pook.

== Events leading to murder ==
=== Kidnap ===
Map of Greater Manchester showing the locations of Capper's imprisonment (Moston) and burning that led to her death (Werneth Low).

At trial, several reasons were given for Capper's kidnapping: Powell claimed that Capper had tried to persuade her to sleep with a man for money; McNeilly and Dudson had contracted pubic lice which they believed were from a bed that Capper had also used; and McNeilly believed that Capper had taken a pink duffel coat that belonged to McNeilly.

In November 1992, when Dudson had contracted pubic lice and had his pubic hair shaved, McNeilly told him she thought that he had caught them from Capper. On 7 December, Capper was lured to Powell's home, where Glyn and Dudson were already waiting. She was grabbed as soon as she arrived and held down while Glyn and Dudson shaved her head and eyebrows and then made her clean up the hair and place it in a bin. Then he placed a plastic bag over her head and walked around her while hitting her on the head taking turns with Dudson. Capper was then kicked by Powell and McNeilly as she lay curled up on the floor, with both women taking turns beating her with a three-foot-long (1 m) wooden instrument and a belt. She was then taken to the bathroom and forced to shave off her own pubic hair as ritual humiliation in revenge for having caused, as they claimed, Dudson and McNeilly themselves to be shaved. Afterwards Powell locked her in a cupboard overnight.

The following morning, Capper was taken upstairs and locked in another cupboard. On 8 December she was transferred to McNeilly's house because of concern that Powell and McNeilly's six children were disturbed by Capper's crying. There she was tied spreadeagle to an upturned bed with electrical flex in a downstairs back room.

=== Torture ===
Over the course of 5 days, Capper was subjected to a series of violent acts, "increasing in severity and brutality as the time passed." She was regularly beaten and injected with amphetamines, burned with cigarettes and had rave music—in particular "Hi, I'm Chucky (Wanna Play?)" by 150 Volts, featuring samples from the film Child's Play—played at maximum volume through headphones. McNeilly would commence each torture session with the phrase, "Chucky's coming to play."

At some point during the week, Pook and Leigh called at the house and saw Capper, blindfolded and gagged, tied to the bed. By this time, Capper had been lying in her own urine and feces for several days and was placed in a bath containing concentrated disinfectant and scrubbed with a stiff brush with sufficient force to remove skin. Pook then used pliers to extract two of her teeth, which police later found at his house "like some kind of macabre trophy." Dudson said: "I was stood at the doorway with Jeanie [Powell] and Bernie [McNeilly]. Cliff [Pook] took her gag off. He told her to open her mouth. He said: 'Right, I'm going to rip your teeth out'. He started hitting her teeth with the pliers. He got the pliers on and started pulling it out. But it just snapped and chipped. Then he hit them a few more times. He put the pliers on again and really, really pulled. He pulled Suzanne's head forward until there was a snap and he had the tooth in the pliers. He did the same again and he was laughing."

=== Missed opportunities for rescue ===
David Hill, aged 18, was asked to "sit in" at the house, and while there heard Dudson shouting in the back room. When he asked what was going on, Leigh had shown him Capper. Hill could clearly see evidence of torture and was later left alone with Capper, but did not free her. He said: "She asked me if I could help, but I told her I couldn't. I asked her who she was. She said her name was Suzanne. She asked me if I could untie her. I said I couldn't do anything." Hill later claimed that he was too afraid to intervene, saying: "I thought they would batter me. If I'd said [anything] they'd all have got me, wouldn't they? I didn't know what to do. I was too shocked to do anything."

Leigh and Dudson also helped Capper's sister's fiancé, Paul Barlow, repair his car while knowing she was being held and tortured in the house. Barlow said: "They could have told me there and then. The door would have been kicked down and I would have got Suzanne out. I did not think they were capable of such savagery. Now all I want is ten minutes with them in a back room."

== Murder ==
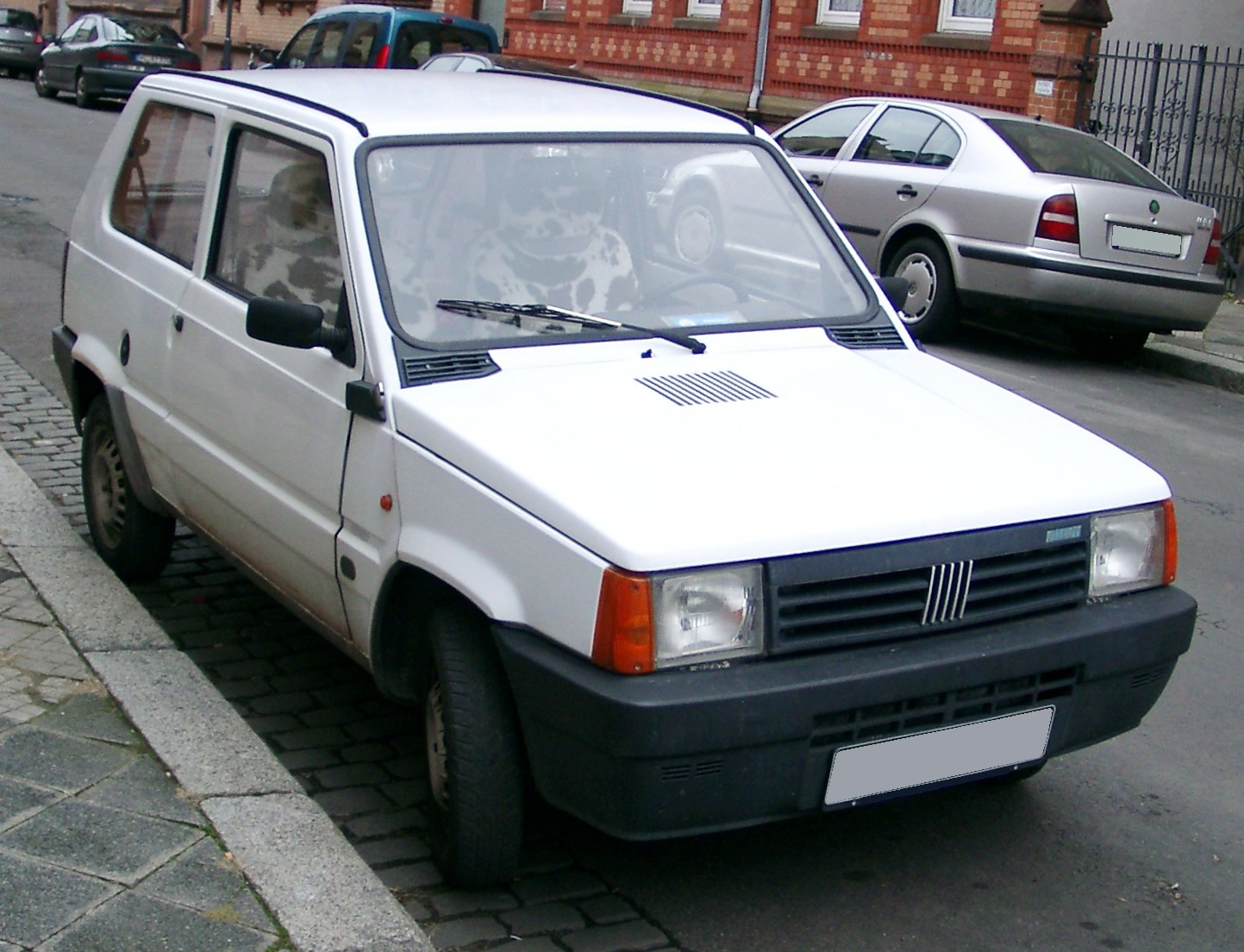
A Fiat Panda similar to the one used by Capper's murderers to convey her from Moston to Werneth Low.

The six primary attackers heard that Capper's family was going to report her as a missing person, and so agreed that Capper had to be removed from the house.

In the early hours of 14 December 1992, Capper was forced into the boot of a stolen white Fiat Panda car and driven 15 miles (25 km) to a narrow lane at Werneth Low, near Romiley, on the outskirts of Stockport. In the car were McNeilly, the Powells and Dudson. McNeilly "giggled" as they made the journey. Powell later said that Capper was pushed down an embankment, into a patch of brambles, where McNeilly poured petrol over her. When McNeilly had difficulty getting the petrol to ignite, Glyn Powell and Dudson made multiple attempts before lighting the girl's body on fire. McNeilly began to sing "Burn baby burn! Burn baby burn!" from The Trammps song "Disco Inferno".

Believing Capper to be dead, the four returned to Jean Powell's house, stopping to buy canned drinks on the way. Both Leigh and Pook were at the house when they arrived.

=== Naming attackers before death ===
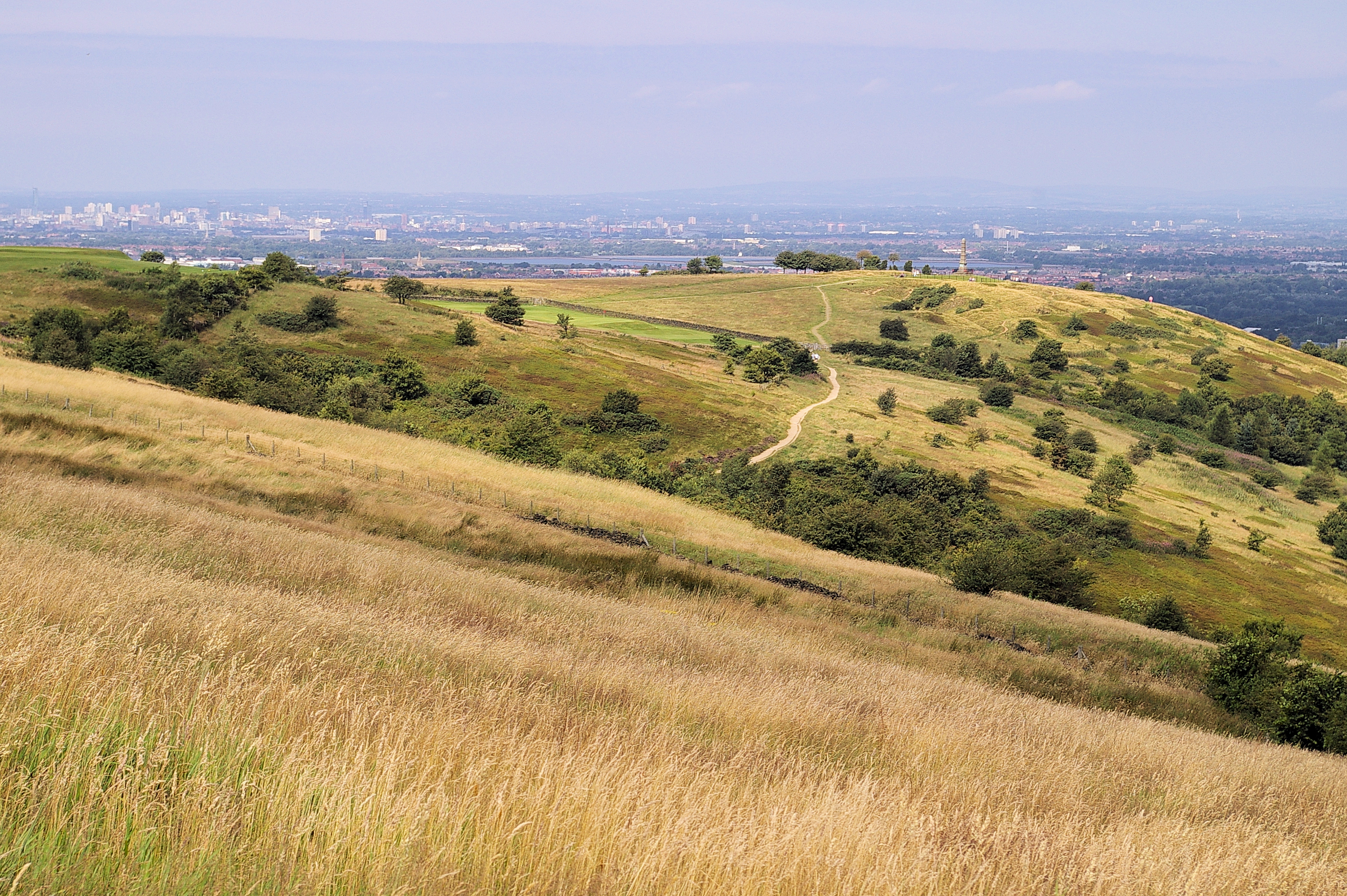
Werneth Low, where Capper suffered burns that led to her death.

After her attackers left, Capper managed to scramble back up the embankment and stagger along the lane for approximately a quarter of a mile (400 metres) to Compstall Road, despite extensive burns. She was found at 06:10 by Barry Sutcliffe and two of his colleagues on their way to work. They immediately took her to a nearby house and roused the residents, Michael and Margaret Coop, to call for an ambulance. Michael Coop said: "Both her hands appeared like ash. Her legs were just like raw meat and her feet appeared to be badly charred. I was struck by how polite the victim was. She was constantly thanking my wife for her assistance." Margaret Coop said: "I instinctively went to put my arms around her but she pulled away because she could not bear to be touched. Her head was shaved and there were recent, not new, cuts to her head. Her face was almost featureless. Her hands were red raw and black at the fingertips. Her legs were red from top to bottom. She couldn't bear anything near her legs."

Capper drank six glasses of water, but was unable to hold the glass herself because of the injuries to her hands. Capper was rushed to the hospital and was able to give the names of her six assailants, as well as Powell's address, before falling into a coma. The extent of her burns was such that her mother and stepfather were unable to recognise her, and she was positively identified by a partial fingerprint from her thumb, the only part of her hands not severely burned. She died on 18 December 1992, without regaining consciousness.

Bernadette McNeilly
- Status: Released
- Motive: Unknown
- Convictions: Murder; Conspiracy to cause grievous bodily harm False imprisonment
- Penalty: Life imprisonment (minimum of 25 years)

Jean Powell
- Spouse: Glyn Powell (separated)
- Status: Released
- Motive: Unknown
- Convictions: Murder; Conspiracy to cause grievous bodily harm False imprisonment
- Penalty: Life imprisonment (minimum of 25 years)

Glyn Powell
- Spouse: Jean Powell (separated)
- Status: Released
- Motive: Unknown
- Convictions: Murder; Conspiracy to cause grievous bodily harm False imprisonment
- Penalty: Life imprisonment (minimum tariff 25 years)

Jeffrey Leigh
- Status: Released
- Motive: Unknown
- Conviction: False imprisonment
- Penalty: 12 years' imprisonment

Anthony Michael Dudson
- Status: Released
- Motive: Unknown
- Convictions: Murder; Conspiracy to cause grievous bodily harm False imprisonment
- Penalty: Detained indefinitely (minimum of 18 years, reduced by two years in 2002)

Clifford Pook
- Status: Released
- Motive: Unknown
- Convictions: Conspiracy to cause grievous bodily harm False imprisonment
- Penalty: 15 years' imprisonment

=== Arrests ===
The inquiry into Capper's death was led by Detective Inspector Peter Wall of Greater Manchester Police. At 07:30 on 14 December, he instructed officers to attend 97 Langworthy Road and arrest everyone that they found there. Jean Powell and McNeilly reportedly laughed and joked with each other as they were arrested. Initially, all six denied involvement. Under questioning, Dudson, who had been urged by his father to tell the truth, began to talk.

D.I. Wall said of Dudson's statement: "As the story began to unfold, we just couldn't believe it. I kept asking myself how one human being could do this to another." Police officers "wept as the extent of Suzanne's suffering was revealed," and together with civilian staff at the station the police collected cash to send flowers to her in hospital.

On 17 December 1992, the six accused appeared before magistrates in Manchester and were remanded into custody, charged with kidnapping and attempted murder. Following Capper's death, they were charged with her murder on 23 December 1992.

=== Inquest ===
The inquest was opened by Leonard Gorodkin at Manchester Coroner's Court on 8 January 1993. Dr. William Lawler, a Home Office pathologist, testified that Capper had suffered 75–80 percent burns, consistent with having had petrol thrown over her and set alight, and that her chance of survival had been minimal; Lawler said: "It was clear from the outset that Suzanne was unlikely to survive. She suffered widespread burns that led to several complications internally," and that her death was due to complications caused by these burns.

The coroner offered: "It is clear that this young girl must have suffered a great deal of pain and had no chance of survival. But she did fortunately survive long enough to give information which led to the people mentioned being charged with her death." He further directed a statement to Capper's mother and stepfather, saying, "I offer you, not just on my behalf, but on behalf of the whole nation, my very deepest sympathy and condolences at this tragic happening to your young daughter."

== Convictions ==
The trial commenced on 16 November 1993, and lasted 22 days. All six denied murder and, in their testimonies, each defendant tried to minimise his or her part in the crime.

The jury began their deliberations on 16 December 1993, and took nine hours and fifty-two minutes to reach their verdicts. Mr Justice Potts said: "Each of you has been convicted on clear evidence of murder which was as appalling a murder as it is possible to imagine."

On 24 November, Clifford Pook was cleared of murder on the directions of Mr Justice Potts.

=== Verdicts and sentences ===
Bernadette McNeilly

- guilty of murder – life imprisonment with a minimum tariff of 25 years (reduced by one year in 2013)
- guilty of conspiracy to cause grievous bodily harm – 20 years
- pleaded guilty to false imprisonment – 20 years

Jean Powell

- guilty of murder – life imprisonment with a minimum tariff of 25 years
- guilty of conspiracy to cause grievous bodily harm – 20 years
- pleaded guilty to false imprisonment – 20 years

Glyn Powell

- guilty of murder – life imprisonment with a minimum tariff of 25 years
- guilty of conspiracy to cause grievous bodily harm – 20 years
- guilty of false imprisonment – 20 years

Jeffrey Leigh

- pleaded guilty to false imprisonment – 15 years
- acquitted of murder
- acquitted of conspiracy to cause grievous bodily harm

Anthony Michael Dudson

- guilty of murder – detained indefinitely with a minimum tariff of 18 years (reduced by two years in 2002)
- guilty of conspiracy to cause grievous bodily harm – 15 years
- pleaded guilty to false imprisonment – 15 years

Clifford Pook

- pleaded guilty to conspiracy to cause grievous bodily harm – 15 years
- pleaded guilty to false imprisonment – 15 years
- acquitted of murder

As the sentences were announced, two jurors wept, and there were cries of "Yes! Yes!" from the public gallery, which was filled with relatives of the victim. In a statement to the press after the sentencing, D.I. Wall said: "psychological reports say that these are absolutely sane individuals. It's frightening that they are such ordinary people. There is nothing special about any of them."

=== Appeals ===
Leigh appealed against his sentence, which was reduced from 12 years to 9 years on 4 November 1994. In 2002, Dudson's minimum tariff was cut from 18 years to 16 years. Dudson appealed again, arguing that the reduction was insufficient and that the Lord Chief Justice "had failed to reflect the continuing obligation to have regard to Dudson's welfare." Lord Justice Kennedy and Mr Justice Mackay dismissed this second appeal on 21 November 2003. He was moved to an open prison in 2009.

Jean Powell and McNeilly were granted leave to have the lengths of their minimum sentences reviewed at the Court of Appeal in June 2012. McNeilly's sentence was reduced by one year.

=== McNeilly prison controversy ===
While she was incarcerated at HM Prison Durham, a routine security check in 1996 uncovered letters which revealed McNeilly had been having an affair with the prison governor, Mike Martin. The married officer resigned his position before disciplinary action could be taken. McNeilly, who was sharing a wing with Rosemary West and Myra Hindley, was immediately transferred to HM Prison New Hall.

=== Releases from prison ===
Leigh was freed early from his sentence in 1998, as was Pook, in May 2001. Both were released on licence.

Dudson was released in 2013, after having his 18 year minimum cut by two years in 2002.

McNeilly was paroled in 2015, after having her 25 year minimum cut by one year, and being described as a "model prisoner".

Jean Powell was released in 2017.

Glyn Powell was released on licence in May 2023.

== Reactions ==
=== Social environment ===
There was wide commentary in the news media about the social situation in and around Moston. Writing in The Times, Jon Ronson focused on Manchester's apparent economic imbalance, pointing out that while "superficially, it is a city of growth"—hosting international environmental conferences in 1993 and bidding to host the 2000 Olympic Games—this could not disguise the realities of the poor quality of "built-to-collapse" housing, the city council's policy on homelessness, poverty, street violence and drug culture, all of which played parts in the events leading up to Capper's murder. The city, he said, had violent "no-go" areas, where "you can expect to be mugged," created through drug abuse and hopelessness, and populated by people who "don't work, have no money, and rarely leave the houses—that they find themselves living in—before dark." Ronson highlighted a city of contrasts, where "expensive canal-side cafes are springing up faster than you can count them; the joke around town is that you can sip cappuccino all day and gaze out at the corpses floating past."

David Ward, writing in The Guardian, similarly drew attention to the housing policies, and quoted an older Moston resident as saying: "These people are moving in and out every three months. They're illiterate, half of them—just shagging and having kids."

The Daily Mail—in what Barker and Petley called "ideological overdrive"—described Capper's killers as "the product of a society that tolerates petty crime, the break-up of families and feckless spending... Most of Suzanne's tormentors were on social security ... [and belonged to] an underclass which is a grave threat to Britain's future."

Author Carol Anne Davis agreed that, when looking for answers about how this crime came about, one need only "look at the upbringings of these women, who were single parents to three children by their mid-twenties, had teenage boyfriends who were barely legal, and who supported themselves through drug dealing and theft."

=== "Moral panic" ===
Davis also noted the unusual situation in that "a gang was involved, and that two females were the sadistic leaders." Following the convictions of Powell and McNeilly, there was wider press speculation about "girl gangs" and the rise in violent crime committed by young women; the "probation service and ex-offender organisations found themselves bombarded with requests from journalists seeking out case histories to illustrate this apparent explosion of LA-style girl-gang culture on the streets of Britain." Mary Barnish, a senior probation officer at the Inner London Probation Service Women's Centre, dismissed the notion, saying: "One woman does something somewhere and immediately there's a great moral panic. People think there's an epidemic of it." Statistics produced by the National Association of Probation Officers (NAPO) did show "an increase in the number of women jailed for offences involving violence." The association's assistant general secretary Harry Fletcher said that, like the women involved in the Capper murder, the group is "characterised by neglect, personal abuse, drug or alcohol abuse and low self-esteem. Many have themselves been the victim of violence. The problem needs help rather than incarceration." In one of the "starkest signs of change" there was "an indication we may face far more female violence in the future as these girls grow up." Despite the focus on the female perpetrators around the time of the crime and trial, Davis pointed out that, in cases like this, which involved female and male sadists, "the female's role is invariably forgotten over time. This was apparent when Dudson's appeals were reported in the national press. Manchester newspapers named all of the killers involved, but most less-localised reports simply referred to the 'violent gang' he belonged to, and it probably wouldn't have occurred to newer readers that this gang included two merciless female sadists who thought that an allegedly stolen duffel coat was an excuse to torture someone to death."

=== "Video nasties" ===
The moral panic was not confined solely to the gender of the murderers, but also the role played by so-called "video nasties". The news media immediately made a connection between the Bulger murder trial and the Capper murder trial when the horror movie Child's Play 3 was mentioned as part of the testimonies. D.I. Wall said "throughout interviews with the accused there was no suggestion that the reason Suzanne was killed had anything to do with Child's Play, but this was overlooked by more sensationalist headlines ("Demonic doll Chucky links the horror crimes"; "The curse of Chucky"). Neither Powell or McNeilly owned a video recorder, and the Child's Play-inspired music that had been used to torture Capper was a popular track at the time, taped direct from Manchester's Piccadilly Radio. Broadcaster David Elstein called the video connection "a false story... branded into the consciousness of the media," and questioned the news media's fascination with the film: "There is no reason to believe that Suzanne Capper would be alive today if the audiotape had instead contained the torture scene from King Lear, or a catchphrase from Bruce Forsyth ... But the Child's Play hare has been running ever since the last day of the James Bulger murder trial." Elstein argued that the film was simply a scapegoat which the press "made a three-course meal out of." The Guardian reported that 21,000 four- to nine-year-olds watched each of BSkyB's two transmissions of Child's Play 3—but Elstein explained the figure was "simply a projection based on an average of just two actual viewers from BARB's reporting panel, and that the margin of error means even the two may have been just one. But why spoil a good running story by asking what the figures mean?"

In April 1994, Professor Elizabeth Newson published Video Violence and the Protection of Children (the "Newson Report") which attracted huge media interest due to its claims that it had "definitively established the long sought-for link between screen violence and the real-life variety," and which cited the Capper murder as an example. Despite its support by the press, however, the report failed to demonstrate any definitive link, "merely drawing inferences from ... often highly speculative accounts in the press rather than independent first-hand research." Newson was called to give oral evidence to the House of Commons Home Affairs Select Committee on Video Violence, where she asserted: "The Suzanne Capper case is another example of very explicit imitation of video and the use of video and that was Child's Play 3." The chairman of the committee, Sir Ivan Lawrence had to point out to Newson that this was incorrect, and that both the police and the British Board of Film Classification had ruled out any connection between the movie and the murder.

The link between the murders and Child's Play 3 by the news media directly led to the delay of the release certification for both Natural Born Killers and Reservoir Dogs.

== See also ==
- Murder of Shanda Sharer
- Murder of Kelly Anne Bates
- Murder of James Bulger
- Murder of Jennifer Daugherty
- Murder of Junko Furuta
- Murder of Sylvia Likens
- Hello Kitty murder case
- Sadistic personality disorder
