= William Lawlor =

William Lawlor may refer to:

- William P. Lawlor (1854–1926), American justice of the California Supreme Court from 1915 to 1926
- William B. Lawlor (fl. 1872–1880), American educator and member of the Los Angeles Common Council

== See also ==
- William Lawler (disambiguation)
