= Duffel bag =

Type of large cylindrical bag

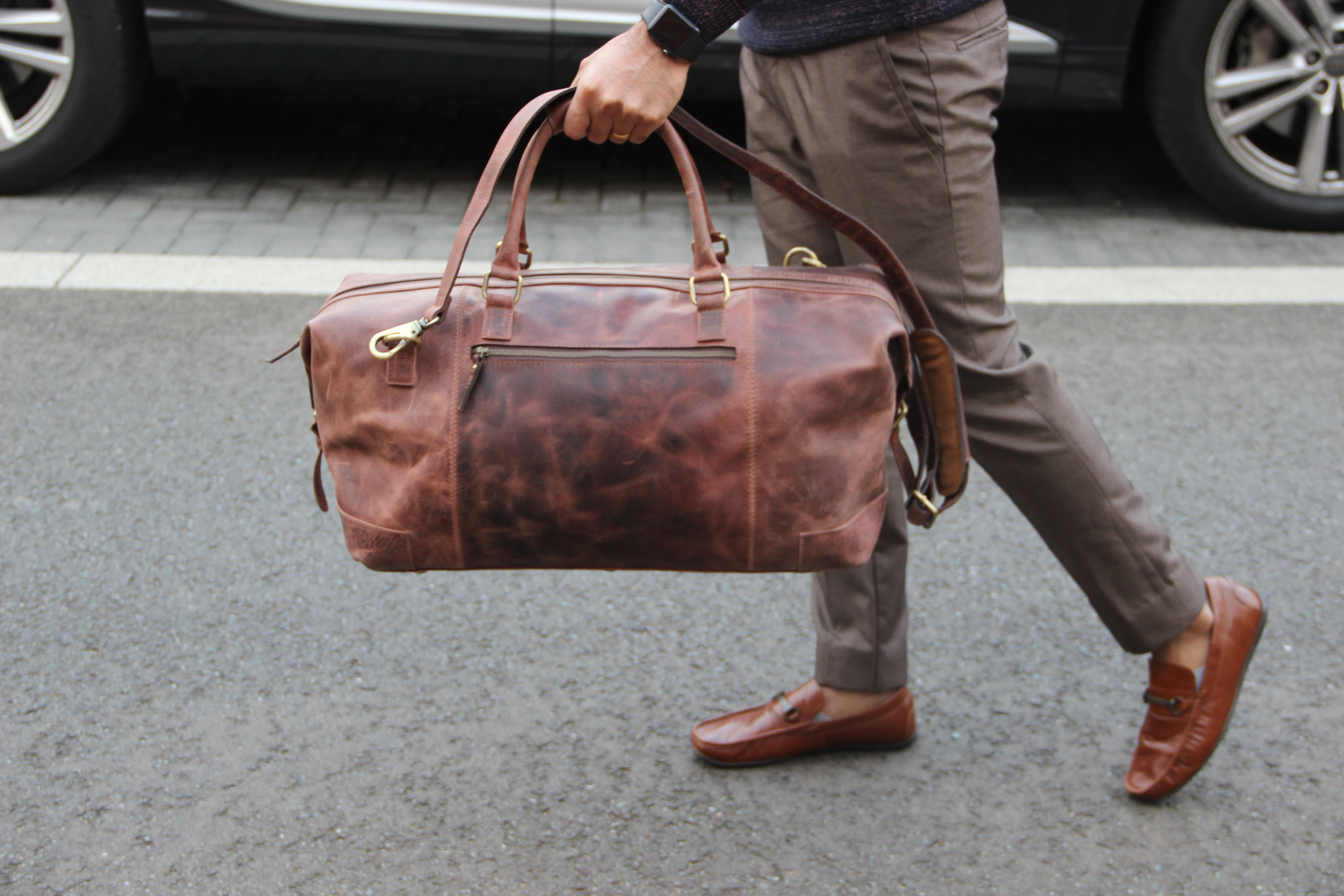
A leather duffel bag

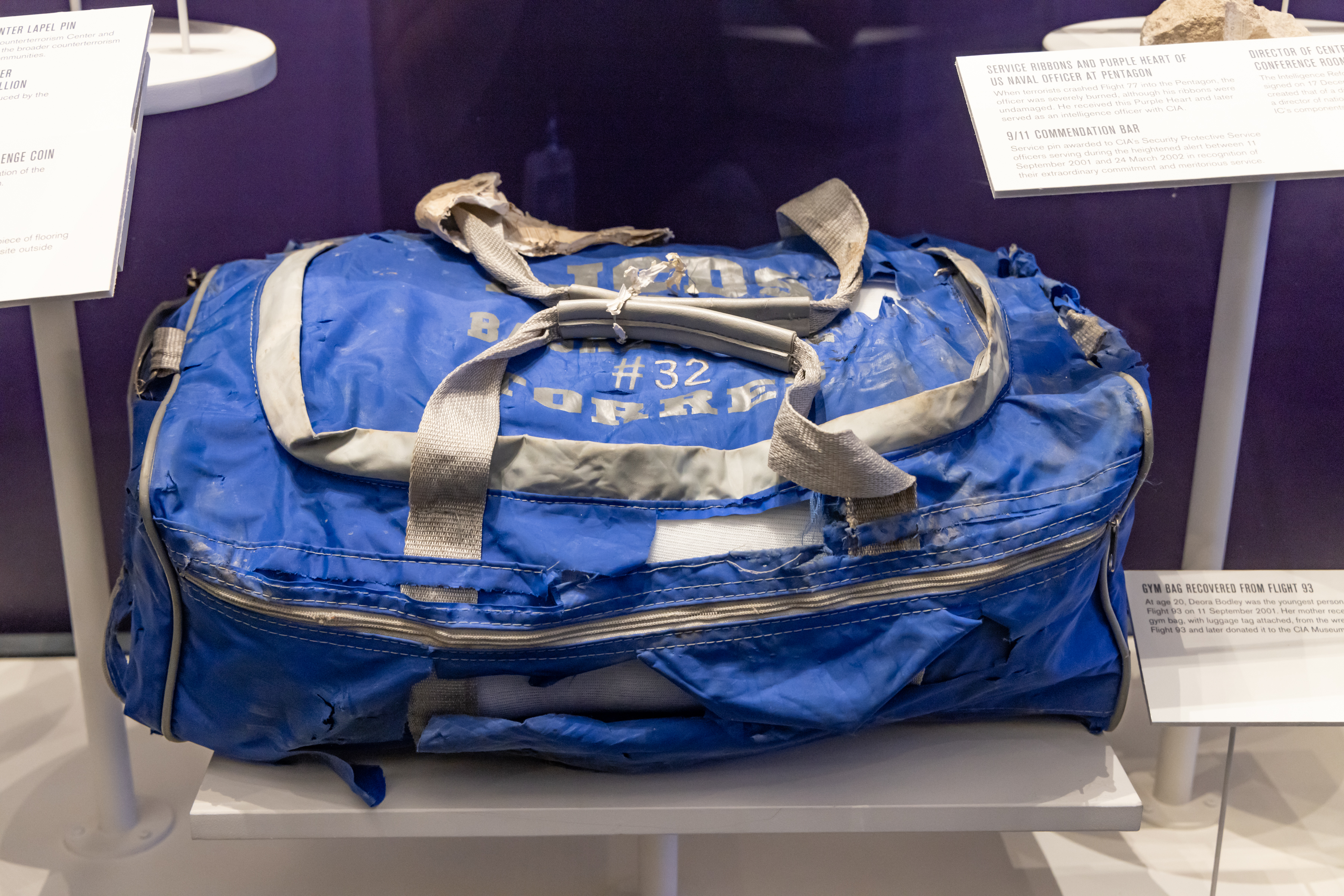
Gym bag recovered from the wreckage of Flight 93

A duffel bag, duffle bag, or kit bag is a large bag made of either natural or synthetic fabric (typically canvas or nylon). It typically has a rectangular base and a zippered opening at the top. Two handles enable the bag to be carried, and a (usually removable) strap lets the user support the bag on the shoulders. It may have wheels and possibly a telescopic handle. The term covers a wide variety of types of bag.

It may also be called a gym bag or carryall in American English, or a sports bag or holdall (or hold-all) in British English.

== Etymology ==
The etymology is disputed. Most sources maintain the name comes from Duffel, a town in Flanders, Belgium, where the thick duffel cloth used to make the bag originated in the 17th century.

According to the Oxford English Dictionary, the word dates back to 1649, used to describe ‘a coarse woollen cloth having a thick nap or frieze’. The earliest reference of the word specifically referring to a duffel bag is 1768.

== Uses ==
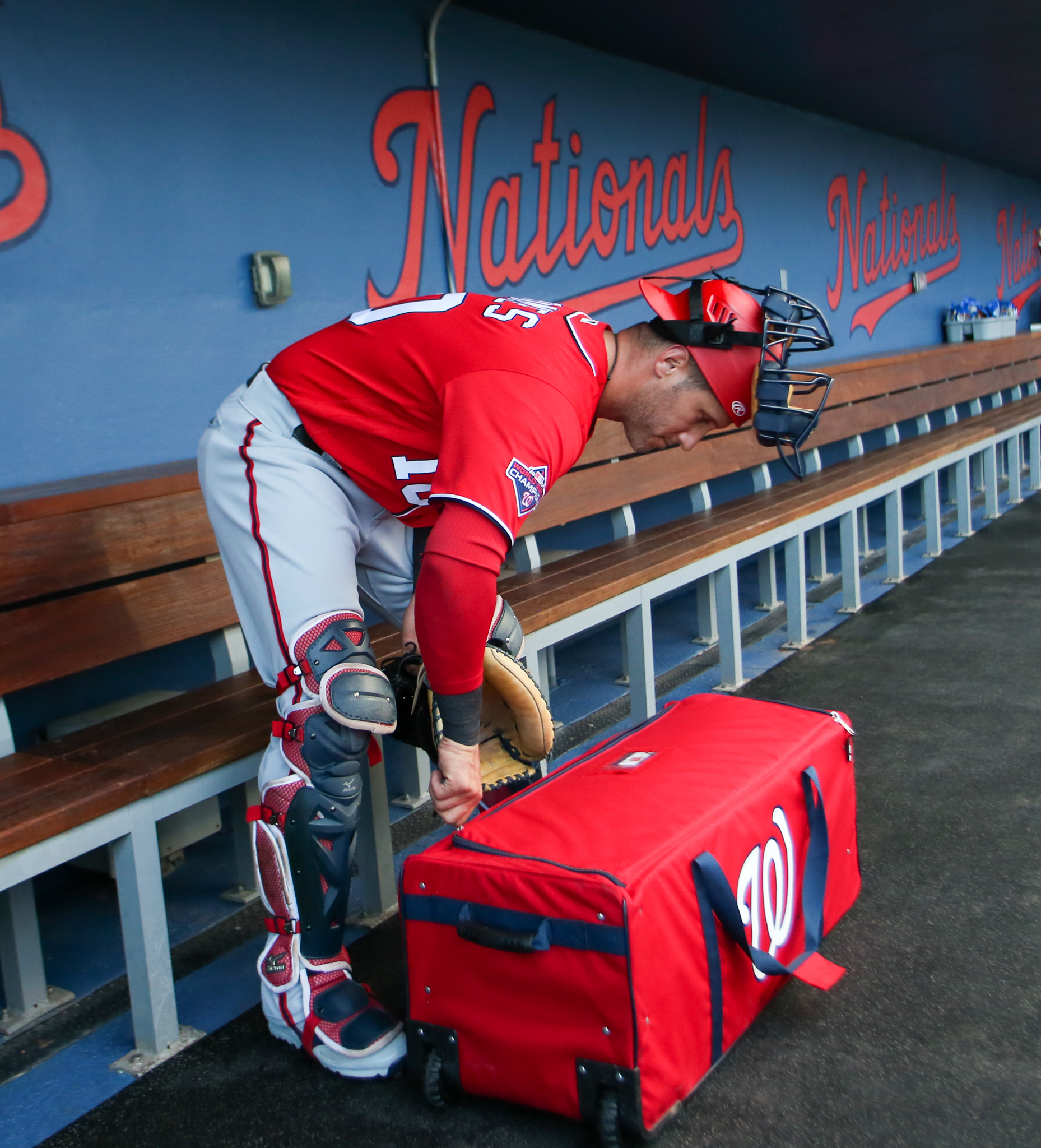
Washington Nationals baseball gear bag

A duffel bag is often used in place of a suitcase or for carrying sports equipment. Duffel bags have the advantage over most suitcases of being compressible when empty.

A duffel bag may be used to carry bedding and blankets etc. It is a flat, rectangular, canvas bag, when unravelled. Once filled, it is rolled like a sleeping bag and held together with straps.

== History ==
Historically, a duffel bag had a top closure using a drawstring. Later bags had a webbing hand grip, along with a shoulder strap with clip that closed the opening by nesting grommets from around the rim of the bag. An over padlockable eye loop and an independent pair of ruck sack straps were also used.

Generally a duffel bag is used by non-commissioned personnel in the military, and for travel, sports and recreation by civilians, especially schoolchildren, who may use them to carry their physical education or football kits. When used by a sailor or marine, a duffel is known as a seabag. A duffel's open structure and lack of rigidity make it adaptable to carrying sports gear and similar bulky objects. Students, enrolled in military boarding schools in India, are issued a hold-all to carry their blankets, quilts and clothes.

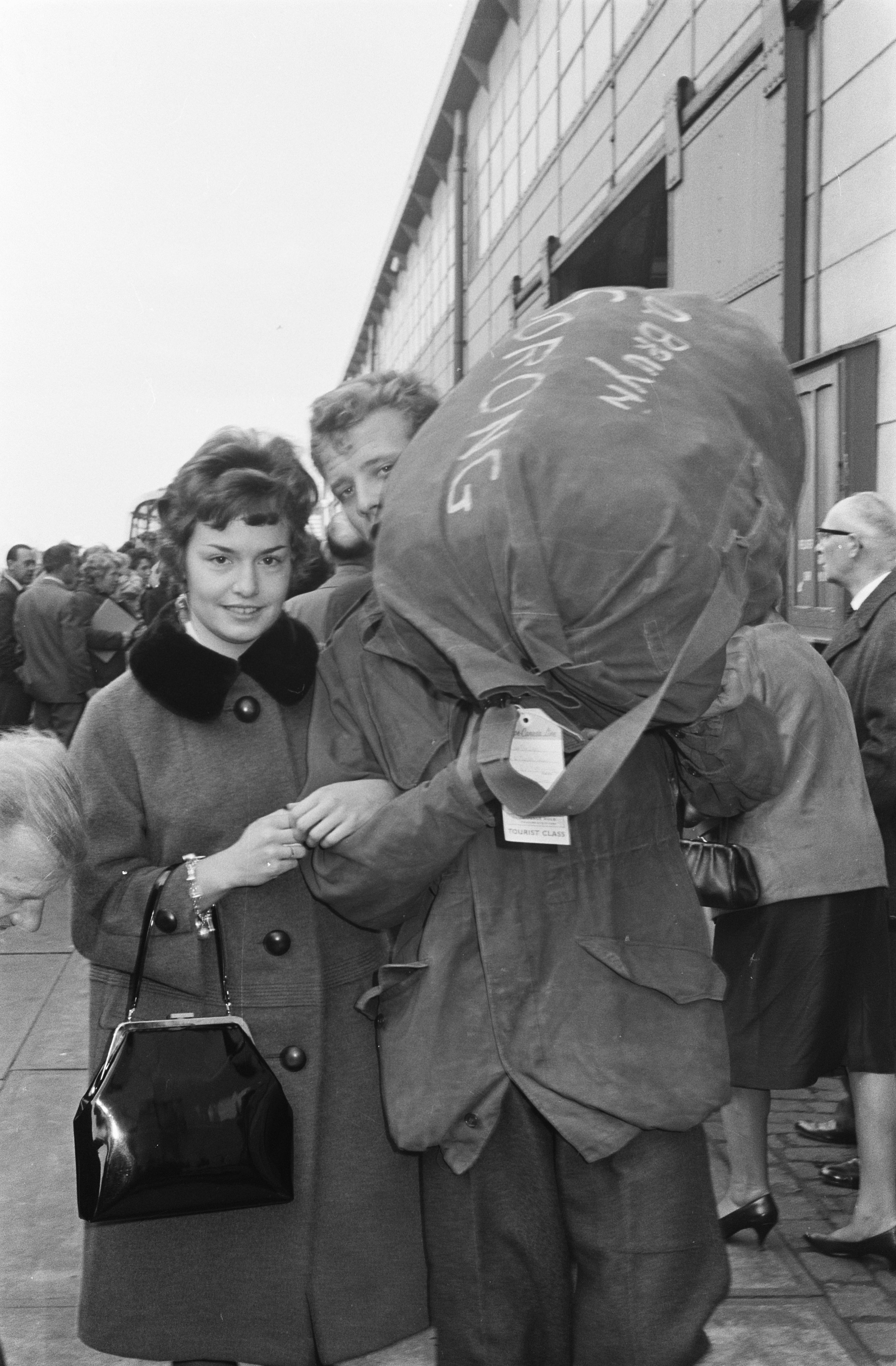
Single shoulder strap, 1962

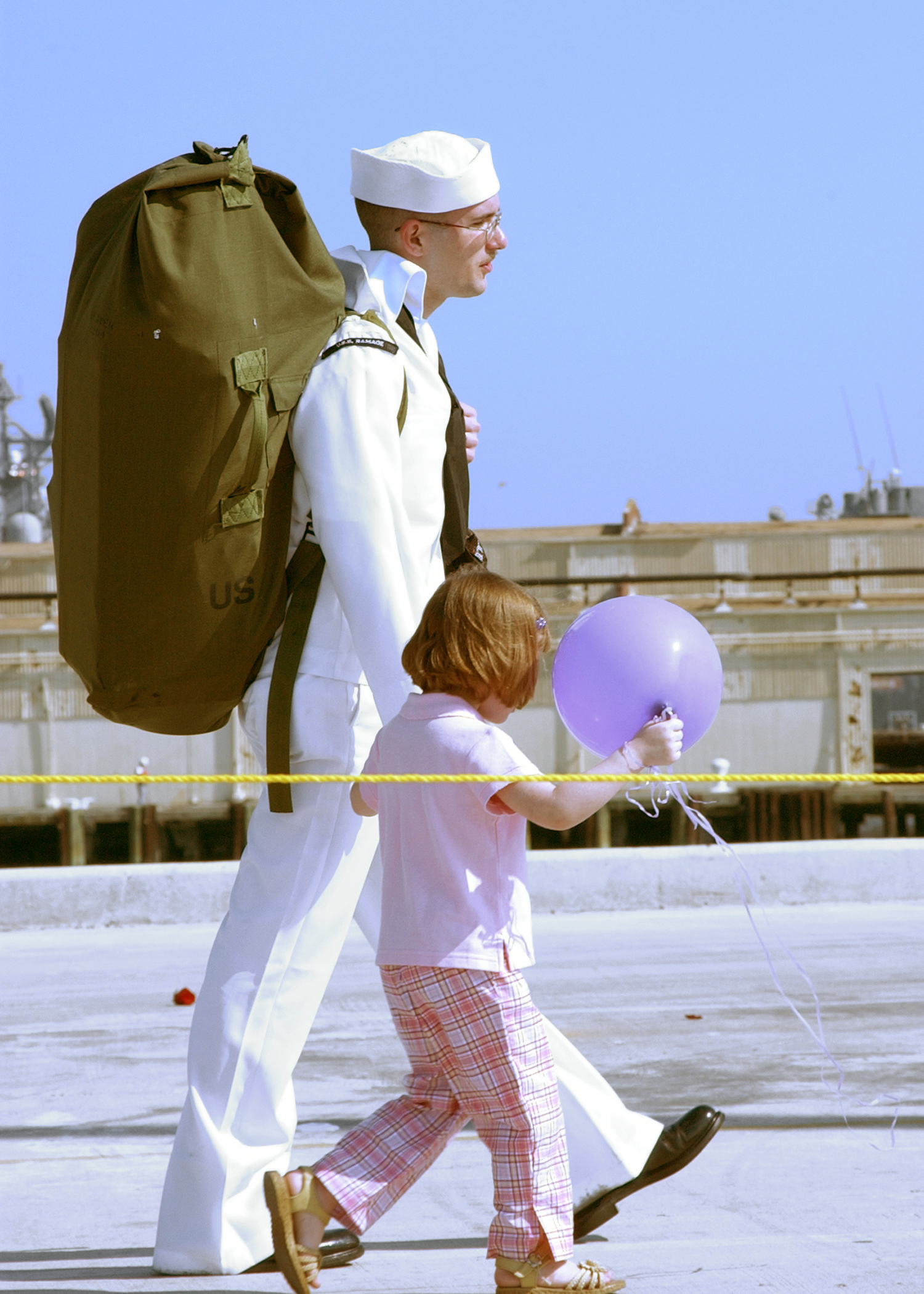
Sailor walks with his duffel bag, 2002.

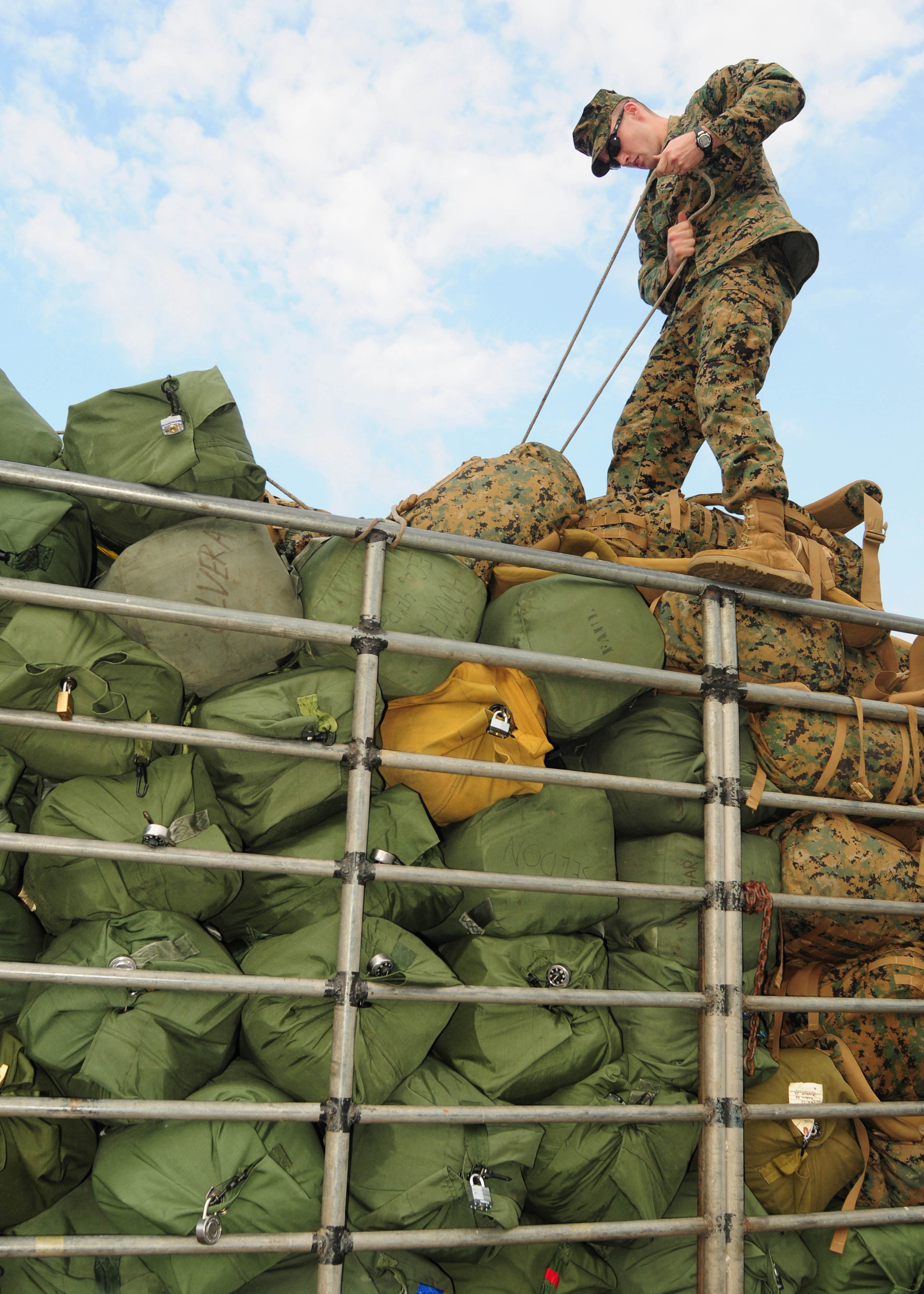
Padlocked duffel bags, 2011

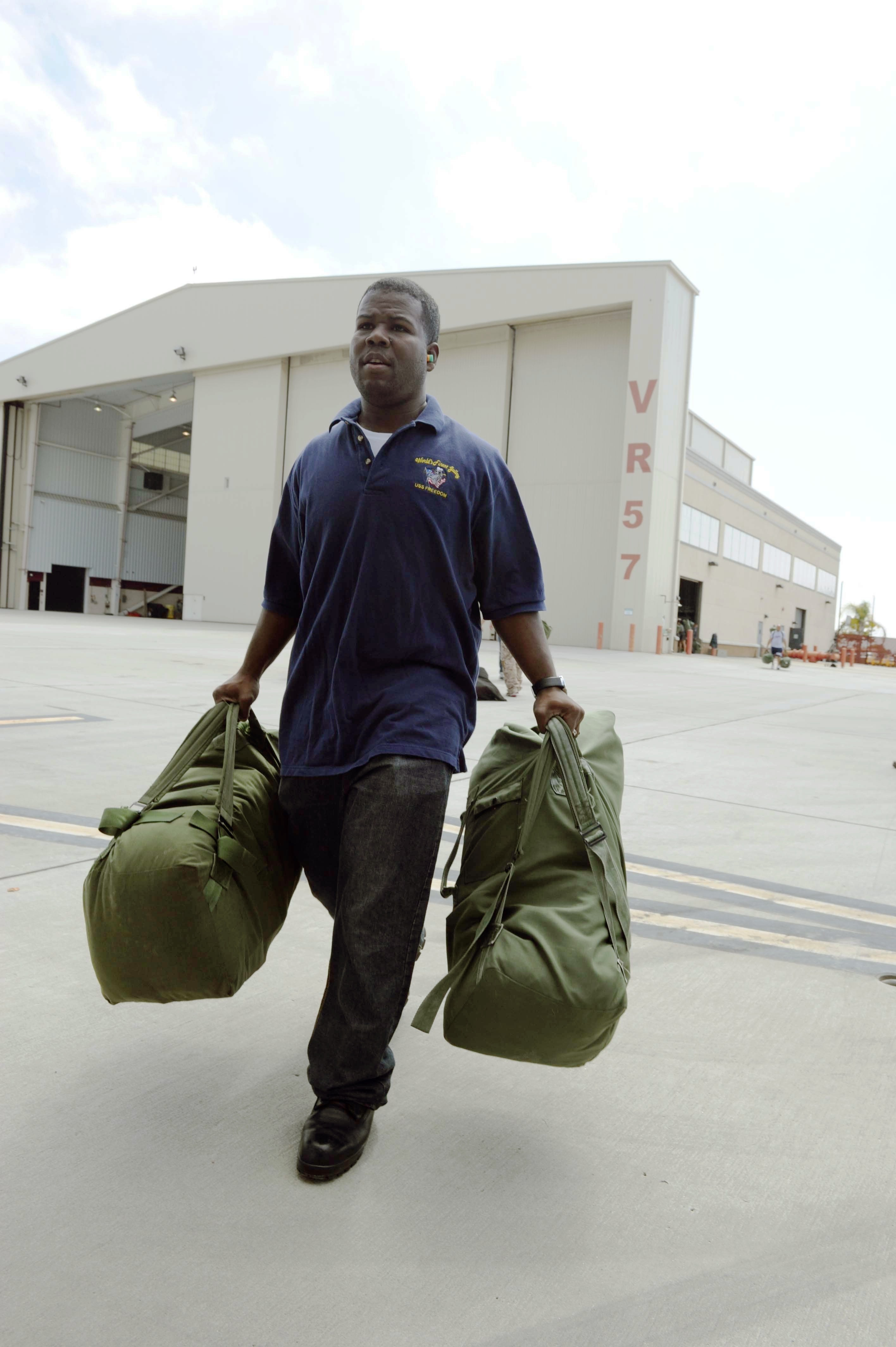
Dual shoulder straps, 2013

== See also ==
- Duffel Blog, a satirical military website
- Duffel coat
- Rucksack
