= Low-temperature burn =

Type of burn injury

- Other names: Low-heat burn, low-temperature scald, slow contact burn
- Specialty: Burn surgery / dermatology
- Symptoms: Redness, blistering, deep dermal injury
- Complications: Infection, delayed healing, hypertrophic scarring, contracture
- Causes: Prolonged contact with moderately heated surfaces/devices
- Risk factors: Elderly age, neuropathy, reduced sensation, use of heating devices during sleep
- Treatment: Cooling, dressings, debridement, skin grafting

Low-temperature burn (also called low-heat burn or low-temperature scald) is a type of burn injury caused by prolonged contact of skin with a heat source of moderate temperature (often ~ 44–51 °C (111–124 °F)) for an extended period, rather than brief contact with very high temperature. These burns may appear superficially mild but often involve deeper dermal or subcutaneous tissue.

== Signs and symptoms ==
Patients typically present with:

- Redness (erythema) of the skin initially
- Blister formation after a delay
- Possible deep dermal involvement even if the surface area looks small
- Pain may be less pronounced initially, especially in people with reduced sensation

Even when burns appear minor, they may be full-thickness injuries requiring medical attention.

== Cause ==
Low-temperature burns occur when skin is in prolonged contact with a moderately heated object or surface. Common situations include:

- Using heating pads, hot water bottles, or electric blankets for warmth or pain relief
- Sitting or lying on heated cushions or floor heating devices (such as traditional radiant floors)
- Therapeutic heat treatments, like warm compresses or moxibustion

These burns usually occur in everyday home settings and are often accidental. The main risk arises when the heat source is left on the skin for a long time, especially for people with reduced sensation, such as the elderly or those with neuropathy.

== Pathophysiology ==
The severity of thermal injury depends on both temperature and duration of exposure. Moderate heat may penetrate deeper tissues before visible skin changes appear, leading to underestimation of burn depth.

== Diagnosis ==
Diagnosis is largely clinical, based on history of contact with a heated surface and examination of skin changes. Deep injury should be suspected even if surface signs appear minor. Imaging (ultrasound, MRI) or consultation with a burn specialist may be needed in uncertain cases.

== Management ==
=== First aid ===
- Remove the heat source
- Cool the affected area with running cool (not ice-cold) water for 10–20 minutes
- Cover with a sterile, non-adhesive dressing

=== Medical and surgical care ===
Because these injuries often involve deep dermal tissue, surgical management may be required, including debridement, skin grafting, infection control, and rehabilitation.

== Prevention ==
Preventive strategies for low-temperature burns focus on reducing prolonged skin contact with moderately heated surfaces or devices. Recommended measures include:

- Avoiding prolonged contact with heating pads, hot water bottles, or electric blankets placed directly on the skin, especially while sleeping or if having reduced sensation.
- Placing a towel, cloth, or clothing layer between the heat source and the skin.
- Checking the temperature and limiting the time spent in contact with heated devices.
- Making sure elderly individuals or people with neuropathy understand the risks of leaving heated items on their skin too long.

== Epidemiology ==
Low-temperature burns are commonly reported in home settings. They are frequently associated with domestic heating devices and therapeutic heat applications. Hospital-based studies indicate that these burns account for a notable portion of contact-burn admissions, and delayed recognition of injury is common because the skin may appear superficially normal.

== See also ==
- Burn
- Thermal injury
- Skin graft
- First aid
