= Duffel =

Belgian municipality

- Municipality
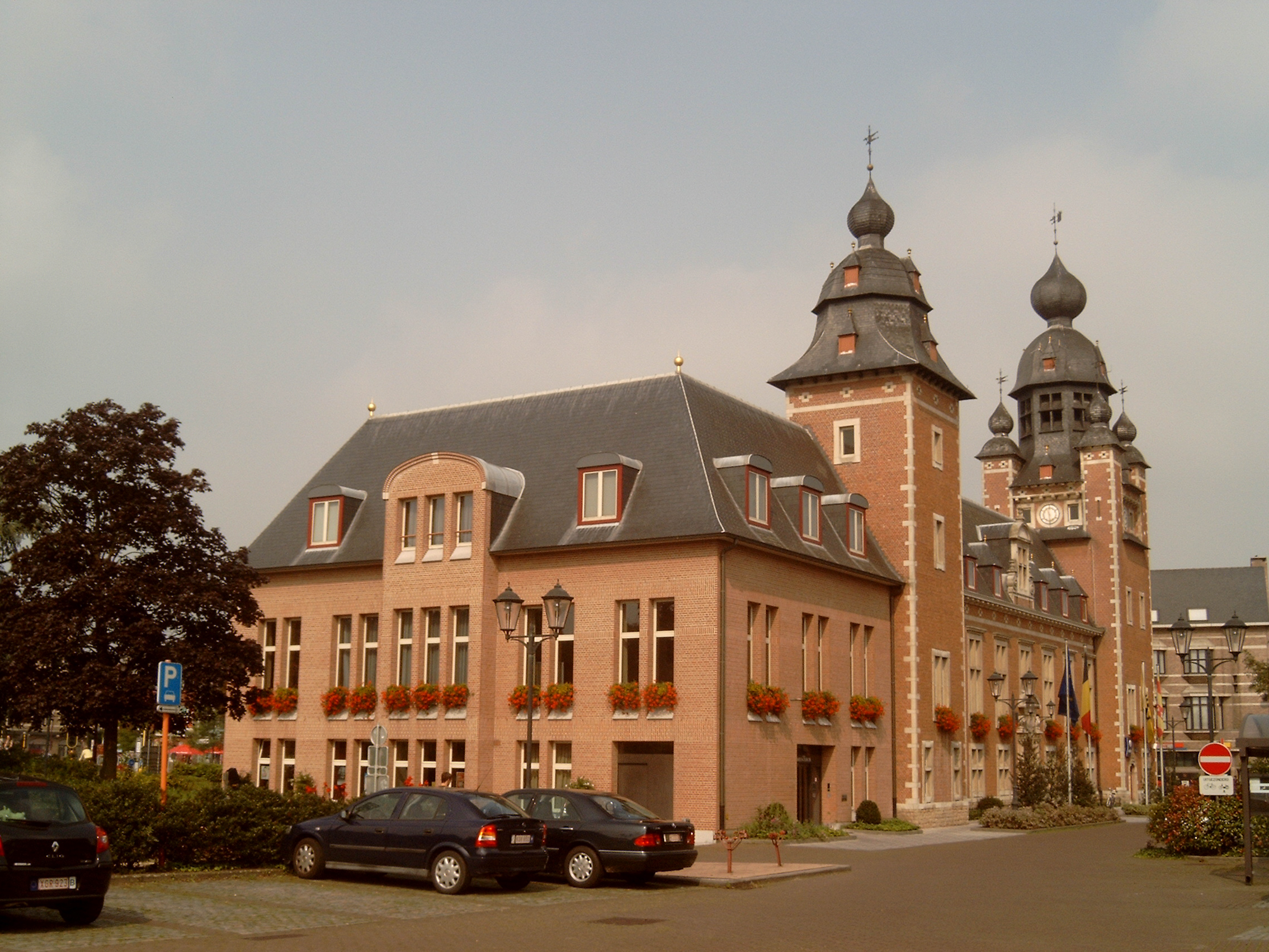
- Duffel Town Hall

- Flag Coat of arms

- Location of Duffel in the province of Antwerp
- Interactive map of Duffel
- Location in Belgium
- Coordinates: 51°06′N 04°31′E
- Country: Belgium
- Community: Flemish Community
- Region: Flemish Region
- Province: Antwerp
- Arrondissement: Mechelen

Government
  - Mayor: Sofie Joosen (N-VA)
  - Governing parties: N-VA, CD&V

Area
  - Total: 22.6 km^{2} (8.7 sq mi)

Population (2020-01-01)
  - Total: 17,664
  - Density: 782/km^{2} (2,020/sq mi)
- Postal codes: 2570
- NIS code: 12009
- Area codes: 015, 03
- Website: www.duffel.be

Duffel (Dutch pronunciation: [ˈdʏfəl]) is a municipality in the Belgian province of Antwerp.

The municipality comprises the town of Duffel proper. On 1 January 2020, Duffel had a total population of 17,664. The total area is 22.71 km^{2}, which gives a population density of 778 inhabitants per km^{2}.

The area is the eponym of a coarse woollen cloth, manufactured in this area from the 11th century, mainly used to make blankets, outdoor (army) coats and tote bags. Duffel became a household name during and after World War II in the meaning of a coat designed with toggle-and-loop fastening and roomy hood.

The etymology of Duffel is from "dubro" and "locus", from the Gaulish dubrum, dubron – "water".

In 1836, the Duffel railway station opened on the Brussels-North to Antwerp railway line.

== Duffel cloth ==
The town gives its name to a type of heavy woolen cloth generally used to make blankets and overcoats, especially for the armed forces, and a type of luggage. In the Middle Ages, an important part of the region's industry was the manufacturing of Flemish laken (a broadcloth), while the cloth produced in Duffel was a thicker variation. The manufacturing process was brought to England by Flemish emigrants in the 1500s. The name for the cloth was so well-known, a type of overcoat made from the cloth and manufactured in England received the name Duffel coat.

== Notable natives ==
- Jan Van Der Roost, composer
- Kevin De Weert, cyclist
- Andreas Pereira, footballer
- Metejoor, singer
- Cornelis Kiliaan (1528–1607), lexicographer and poet
- Hendrik Hondius I (1573–1650), engraver, cartographer and publisher
- Rocky Bushiri, footballer for Hibernian FC
- Gaëtan De Knyff, racing driver

== Climate ==
Climate data for Duffel (1991−2020 normals)
Month	Jan	Feb	Mar	Apr	May	Jun	Jul	Aug	Sep	Oct	Nov	Dec	Year
Mean daily maximum °C (°F)	6.7 (44.1)	7.7 (45.9)	11.2 (52.2)	15.5 (59.9)	19.0 (66.2)	21.8 (71.2)	23.9 (75.0)	23.7 (74.7)	20.1 (68.2)	15.4 (59.7)	10.4 (50.7)	7.1 (44.8)	15.2 (59.4)
Daily mean °C (°F)	4.0 (39.2)	4.4 (39.9)	7.1 (44.8)	10.3 (50.5)	14.1 (57.4)	17.0 (62.6)	19.1 (66.4)	18.7 (65.7)	15.4 (59.7)	11.5 (52.7)	7.4 (45.3)	4.5 (40.1)	11.1 (52.0)
Mean daily minimum °C (°F)	1.3 (34.3)	1.1 (34.0)	2.9 (37.2)	5.3 (41.5)	9.2 (48.6)	12.2 (54.0)	14.3 (57.7)	13.8 (56.8)	10.7 (51.3)	7.5 (45.5)	4.3 (39.7)	1.9 (35.4)	7.0 (44.7)
Average precipitation mm (inches)	68.0 (2.68)	60.3 (2.37)	54.1 (2.13)	40.8 (1.61)	55.4 (2.18)	72.6 (2.86)	76.3 (3.00)	81.6 (3.21)	69.3 (2.73)	64.4 (2.54)	74.3 (2.93)	84.2 (3.31)	801.3 (31.55)
Average precipitation days (≥ 1.0 mm)	11.9	11.1	10.4	8.5	9.5	9.8	10.2	10.1	9.6	10.6	12.1	13.4	127.2
Mean monthly sunshine hours	61	77	134	188	218	218	223	210	163	117	66	51	1,726
Source: Royal Meteorological Institute

== Gallery ==
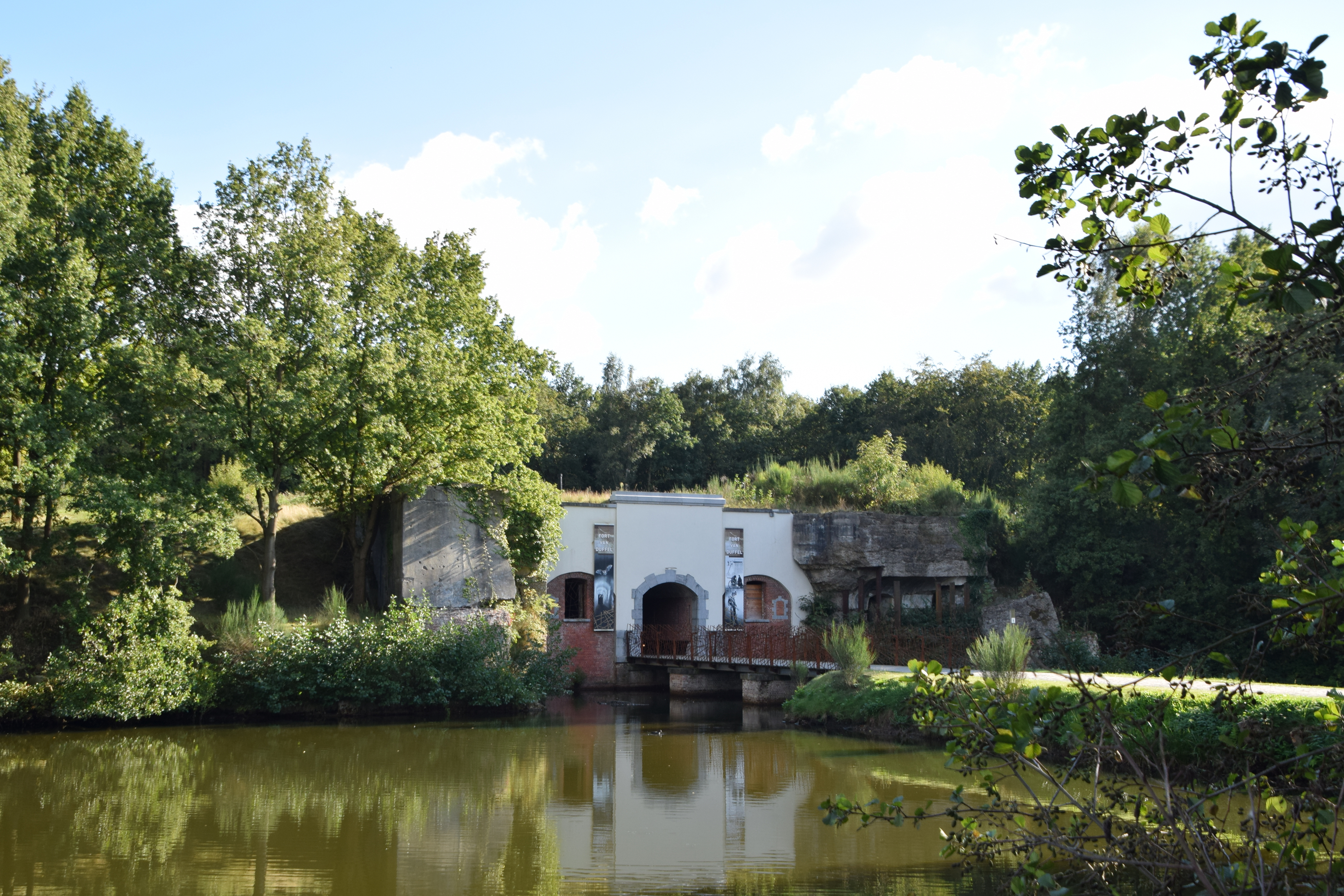
Fort van Duffel

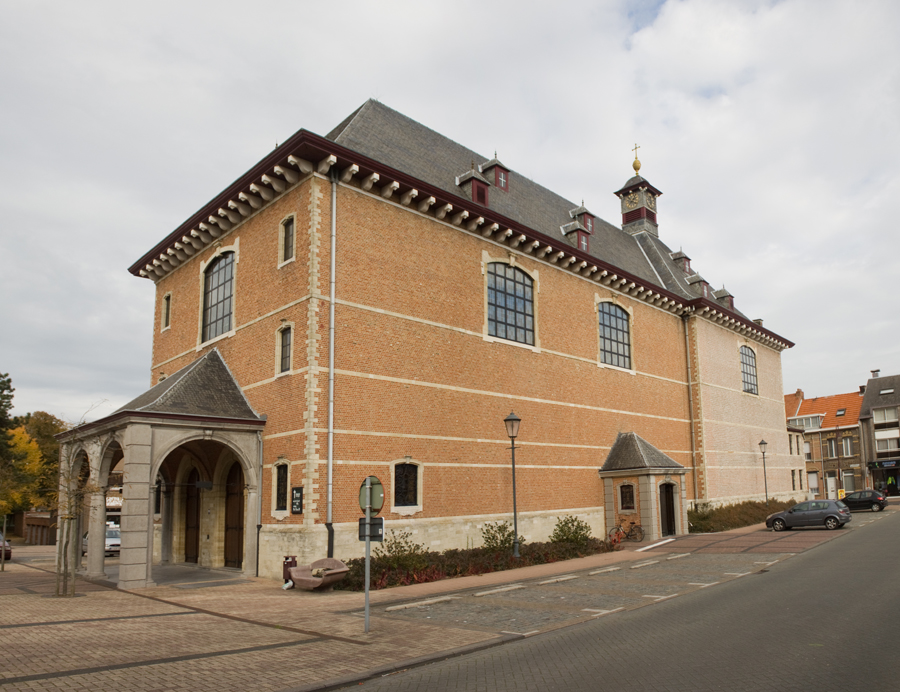
Onze-Lieve-Vrouw van de Goede Wil church

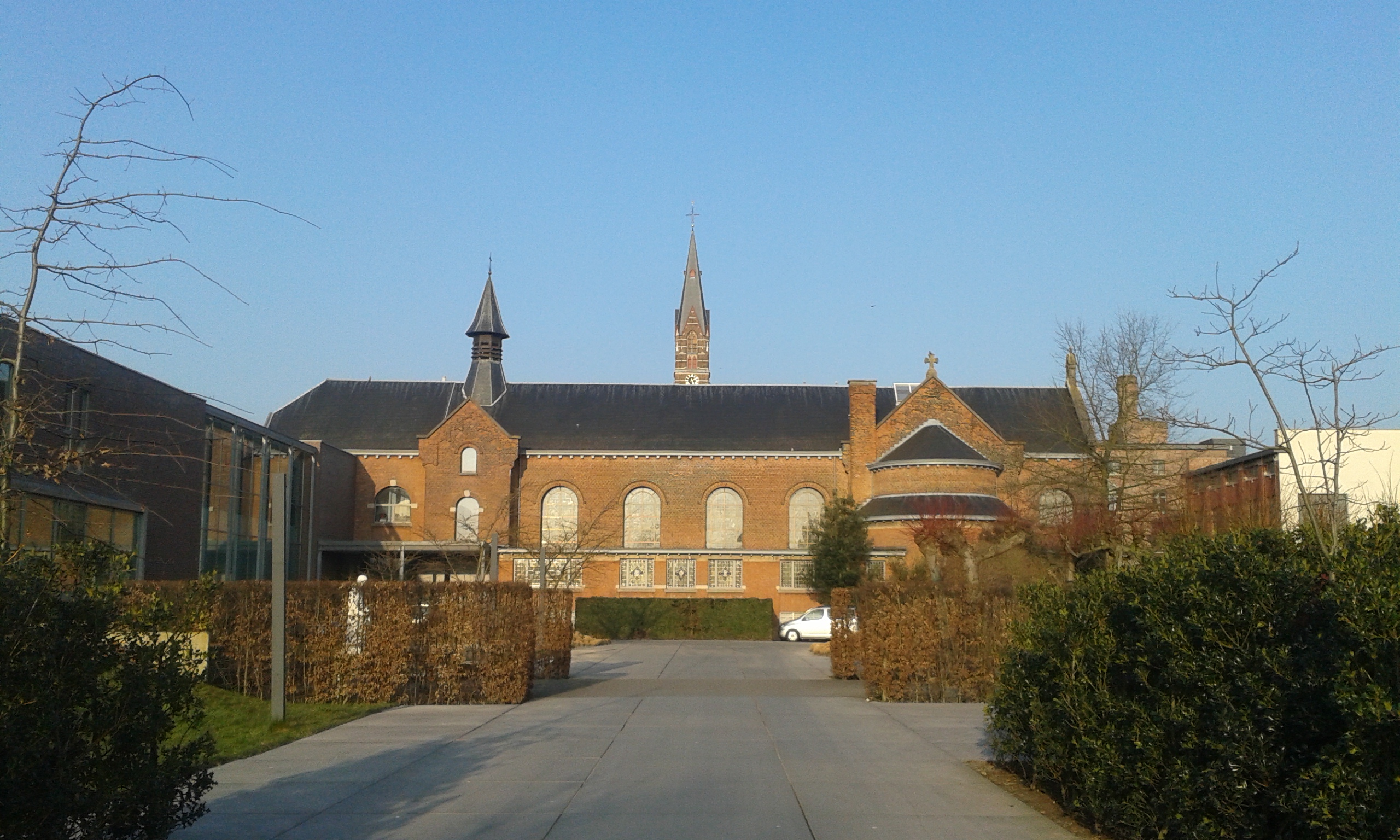
Betlehem Convent

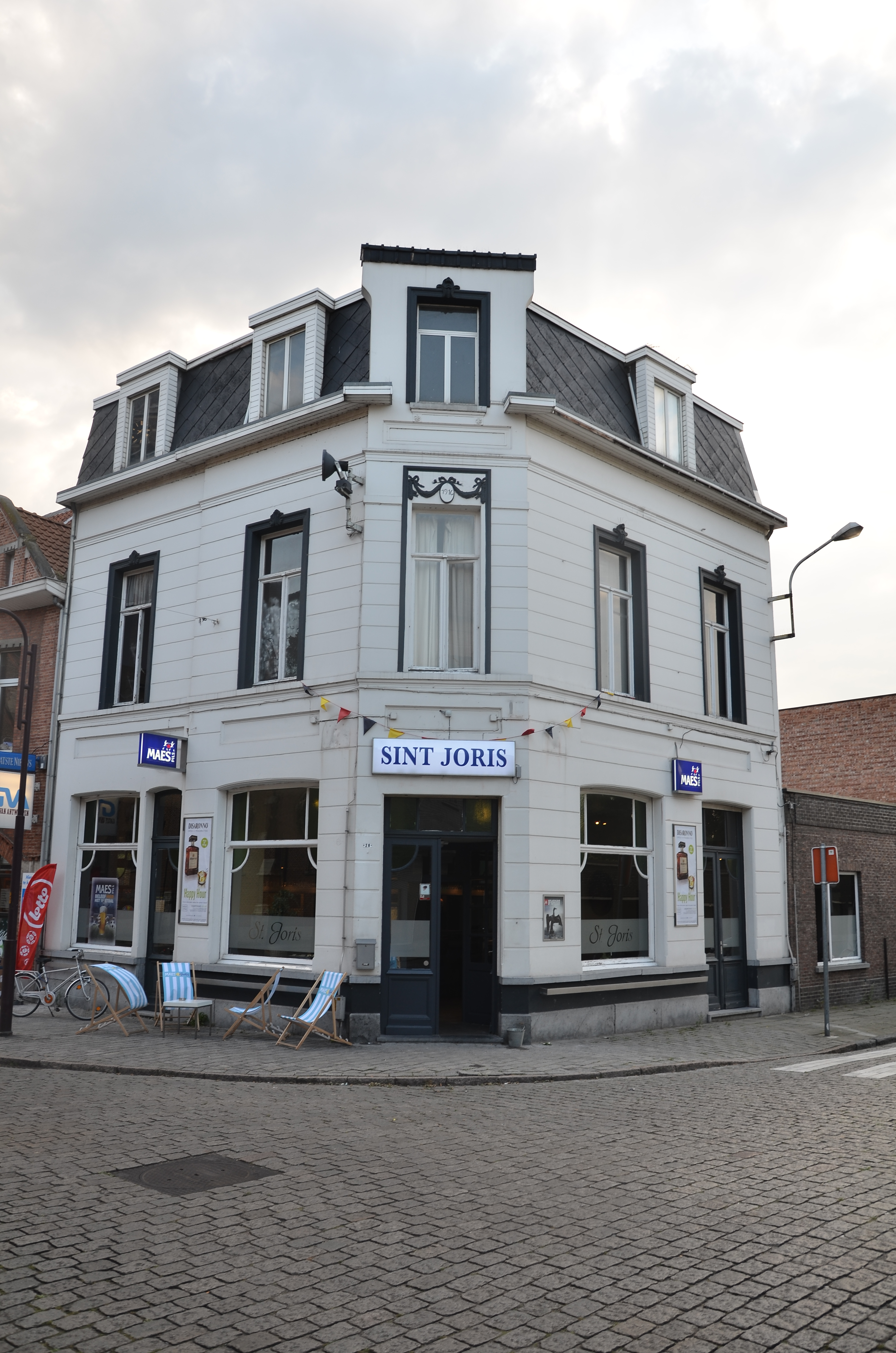
Pub in Duffel

== See also ==
- Duffel coat
- Duffel bag
