= Murder of Kelly Anne Bates =

Murder and torture of an English teenager

Kelly Anne Bates
- Born: 18 May 1978; Hattersley, Greater Manchester, England
- Died: 16 April 1996 (aged 17); Manchester, England
- Cause of death: Torture murder
- Body discovered: Gorton, Greater Manchester, England
- Resting place: Mottram Cemetery; Mottram in Longdendale, England
- Parent: Margaret Bates (mother)

Kelly Anne Bates (18 May 1978 – 16 April 1996) was an English teenager who was murdered in Manchester, England, at the age of 17 by her abuser, James Patterson Smith (born c. 1948). She was tortured by him over a period of four weeks, including having her eyes gouged from their sockets up to three weeks before her death, before being drowned in a bathtub.

The murder inquiry was headed by Detective Sergeant Joseph Monaghan of Greater Manchester Police, who said: "I have been in the police force for 15 years and have never seen a case as horrific as this." William Lawler, the pathologist who examined Bates' body, described her injuries as the worst he had seen on a murder victim. Smith, who had a history of violence and torture against former sexual partners, denied murdering Bates but was convicted and sentenced to life imprisonment on 19 November 1997.

== Background ==
James Smith was an unemployed divorcee living in the Gorton area of Manchester. Described by acquaintances as "house-proud" and "well groomed", he was a teetotaller and non-smoker. Smith's marriage had ended in 1980, after ten years, because he had been violent towards his wife. His next relationship was with 20-year-old Tina Watson, whom between 1980 and 1982 he "used as a punch-bag", even subjecting her to severe beatings while she was pregnant with their child. She said: "At first it was now and again; just a little tap. But in the end it was every day. He would smack me in the face or hit me over the head with an ashtray. He would kick me in the legs or between the legs." Watson managed to escape from the relationship, during which Smith had also attempted to drown her while she was bathing. After that relationship came to an end in 1982, Smith started seeing 15-year-old Wendy Mottershead, whom he also abused. In one attack he held her head under water in the kitchen sink in an attempt to drown her.

In 1993, Smith began grooming Kelly Bates when she was 14 years old, having met her while she was babysitting for friends. Approximately two years later, when she had left school, Bates moved in with Smith at his home in Furnival Road, Gorton. She was concealing the age difference between them from her parents, Tommy and Margaret Bates. Bates' mother said of her first meeting with Smith after the two had started living together: "As soon as I saw Smith the hairs on the back of my neck went up. I tried everything I could to get Kelly Anne away from him."

Although Bates had left Smith briefly because of arguments with him, she was once more living with him at Furnival Road by the end of November 1995. Her parents noticed bruises and bite marks on her, which she explained away as being the results of accidents. She became increasingly withdrawn and in December 1995 resigned from her part-time job. In March 1996, Bates' parents received cards purportedly from her for their anniversary and a birthday, but only Smith had written in them. When her brother tried to see her at the house, Smith said she was not at home. When a concerned neighbour asked after her, she was briefly shown at an upstairs window.

== Murder ==
On 16 April 1996, Smith reported to authorities that he had accidentally killed Kelly during an argument in a bathtub, claiming that she had inhaled water and died following his attempts at resuscitation. He also claimed that she often pretended to be unconscious. Police went to Smith's address and found Bates' naked body in a bedroom. Her blood was found throughout the house, and a post-mortem examination revealed over 150 separate injuries on her body. During the last month of her life she had been kept bound, sometimes tied to a radiator or furniture by her hair, other times by her neck using a ligature.

William Lawler, the Home Office pathologist who examined her body, said: "In my career, I have examined almost 600 victims of homicide but I have never come across injuries so extensive." The following injuries were found on Bates' body:

- Scalding to her buttocks and left leg
- Burns on her thigh caused by the application of a hot iron
- A fractured arm
- Multiple stab wounds caused by knives, forks and scissors
- Stab wounds inside her mouth
- Crush injuries to both hands
- Mutilation of her ears, nose, eyebrows, mouth, lips and genitalia
- Wounds caused by a spade and pruning shears
- Both eyes gouged out
- Later stab wounds to the empty eye sockets
- Partial scalping

The pathologist determined that her eyes had been removed "not less than five days and not more than three weeks before her death". She had been starved, having lost around 20 kg in weight, and had not received water for several days before her death. Peter Openshaw, the prosecutor in Smith's trial, said: "It was as if he deliberately disfigured her, causing her the utmost pain, distress and degradation ... The injuries were not the result of one sudden eruption of violence; they must have been caused over a long period [and] were so extensive and so terrible that the defendant must have deliberately and systematically tortured the girl." The cause of death was drowning, immediately prior to which she had been beaten about the head with a showerhead.

== Trial ==
Smith denied murder and claimed Bates "would put me through hell winding me up". He also claimed that Bates had "taunted" him about his dead mother and had "a bad habit of hurting herself to make it look worse on me". When asked to explain why he had blinded, stabbed, and battered Bates, he said she had dared him to do it, challenging him to do her harm. Gillian Mezey, a consultant psychiatrist, told the court that Smith had "a severe paranoid disorder with morbid jealousy" and lived in a "distorted reality".

The jury at Manchester Crown Court took one hour to find 49-year-old Smith guilty of Bates' murder. Sentencing him to life imprisonment, the judge, Mr. Justice Sachs, recommended that Smith serve a minimum term of 20 years. He stated: "This has been a terrible case; a catalogue of depravity by one human being upon another. You are a highly dangerous person. You are an abuser of women and I intend, so far as it is in my power, that you will abuse no more."

The jury were offered professional counselling to help them deal with the distress of seeing the photographs of Bates' injuries and the "sickening violence" of the case. All members of the jury accepted this offer.

== In the media ==
=== Television ===
The murder has been the subject of at least one television documentary:

- Britain's Darkest Taboos, series 4, episode 2: "Our Daughter Was Tortured To Death By Her Sadistic Boyfriend". First broadcast by Crime & Investigation on 22 February 2015.

== See also ==
- Hello Kitty murder case
- Murder of Junko Furuta
- Murder of Suzanne Capper
- Murder of Sylvia Likens
- Murder of Tia Rigg
- Sadistic personality disorder
