= Duffel coat =

Coat made of heavy, coarse woolen fabric with toggle closures

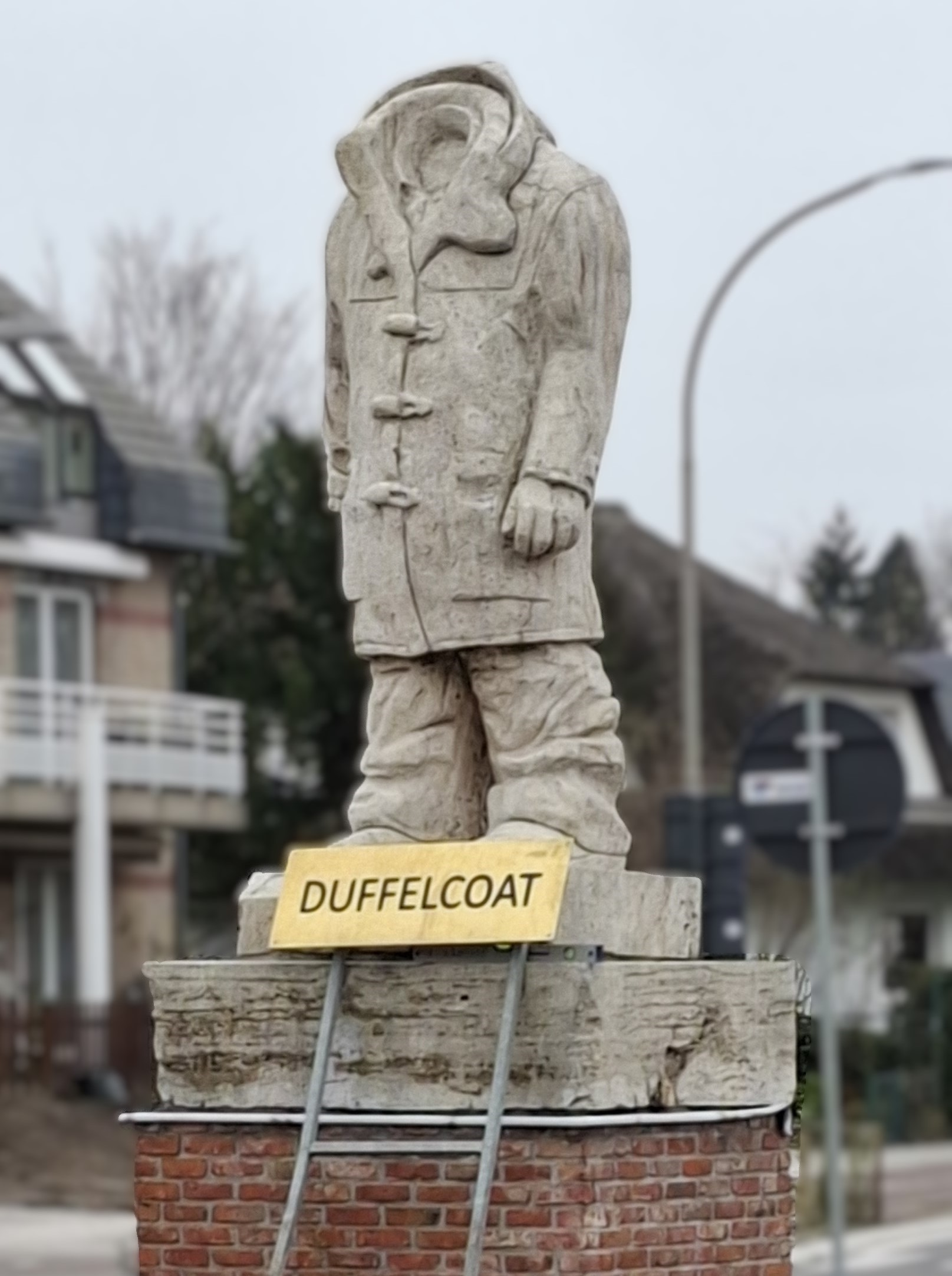
Duffel coat statue at Duffel

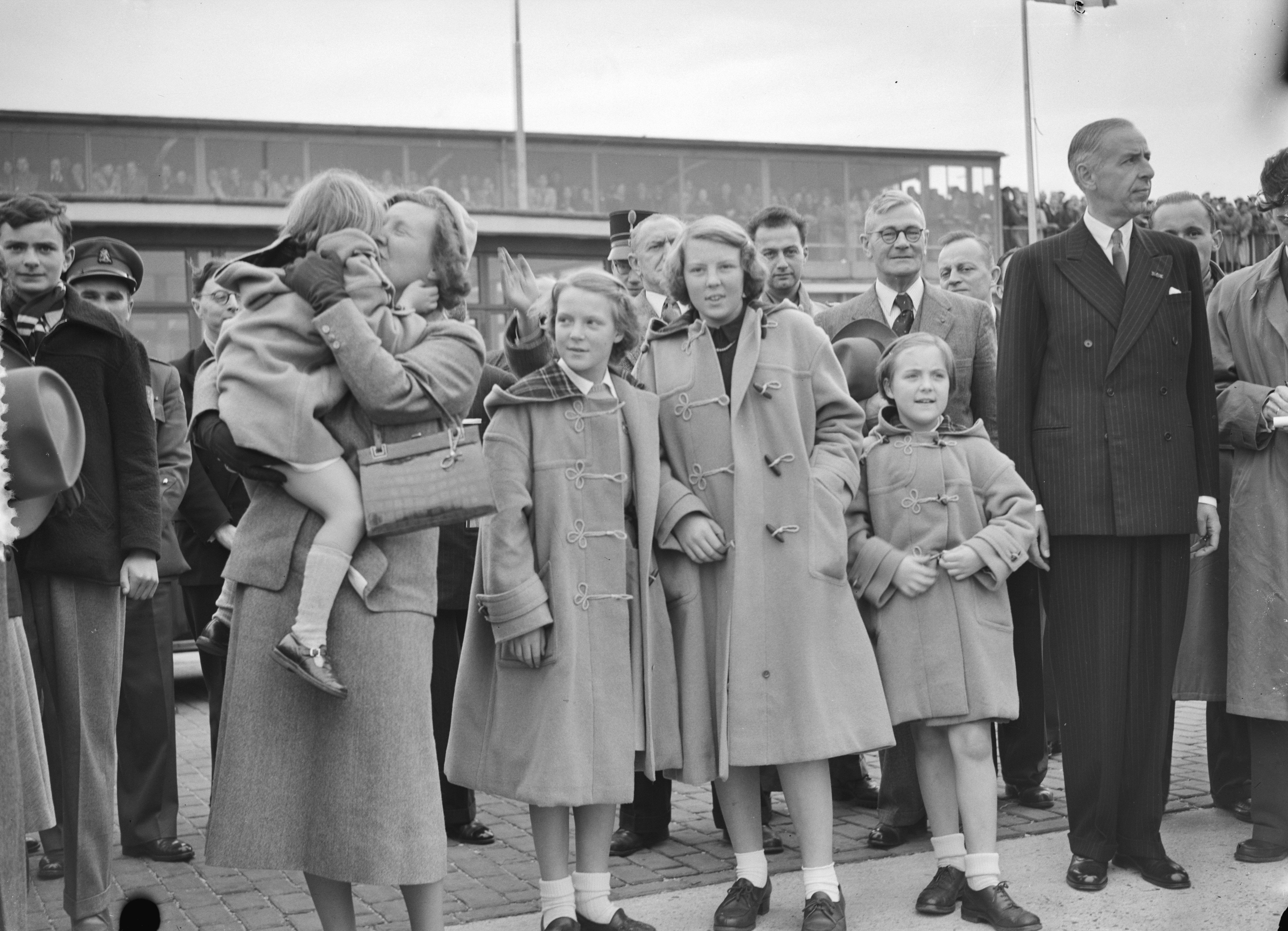
Dutch princesses in duffel coats, as a statement, shortly after World War II

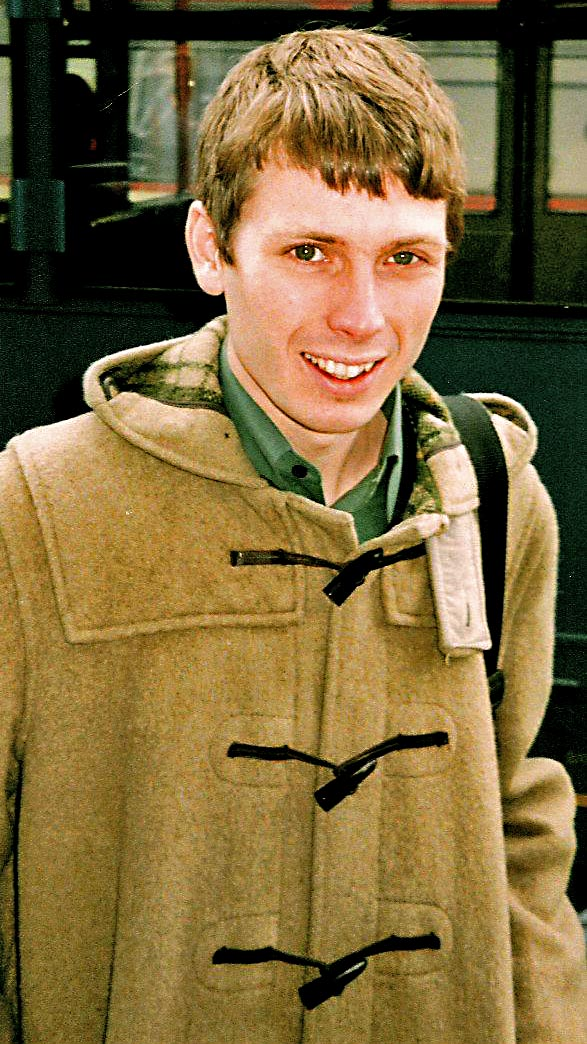
British musician Alex Kapranos in a contemporary duffel coat

A duffel coat (also duffle coat) is a coat made from duffel cloth, designed with toggle-and-rope fastenings, patched pockets and a large hood. The name derives from Duffel, a town in the province of Antwerp in Belgium where the manufacturing process of this kind of fabric, a coarse, thick, woolen cloth originated. Duffel bags were originally made from the same material.

As the hood and toggle fastenings from Polish frocks proved popular, the frock spread across Europe by the 1850s. By 1890 a less sophisticated version was being supplied to the British Royal Navy, from various manufacturers. During World War II all British troops wore the coat, among them Field Marshal Sir Bernard Montgomery and Lieutenant-Colonel Sir David Sterling. After the war, the coats became available in England as government surplus stock and became popular, especially with students. In countries freed by British troops from Nazi-German occupation, wearing the coat also meant a tribute to all soldiers that fought in the war and a statement to civilian freedom.

== Description ==
There are many variations of duffel coat. The basic British style features:

- Genuine double weave woollen duffel fabric, lined with a woolly tartan pattern, or plain in the military version.
- Three or, later, four front wooden or horn toggle and leather fastenings.
- Two large outside patch pockets, with covering flaps on post-war versions.
- Originally knee length; shorter on later versions.
- A buttonable neck strap.
- Bucket hood with press stud adjustment. Later versions feature a neater "pancake" hood.

The large toggles and long ropes from the army coats were designed to enable easily fastening and unfastening while wearing gloves in cold weather. Current designs often feature imitation plastic buffalo horn. The original hood was oversized to allow room for a Naval cap.

== History ==
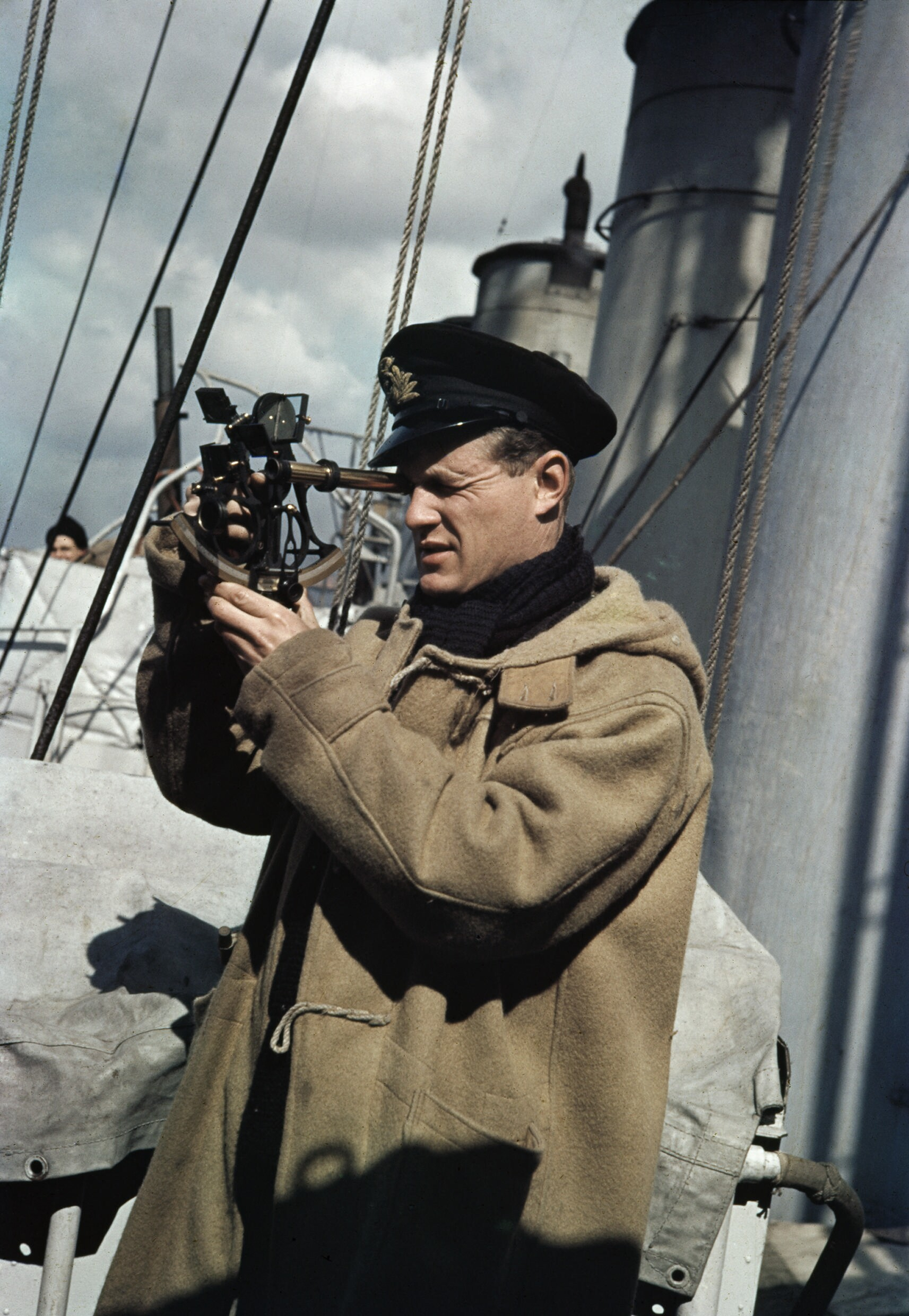
A Royal Navy officer wearing a duffel coat aboard a destroyer on convoy protection duties, 1942

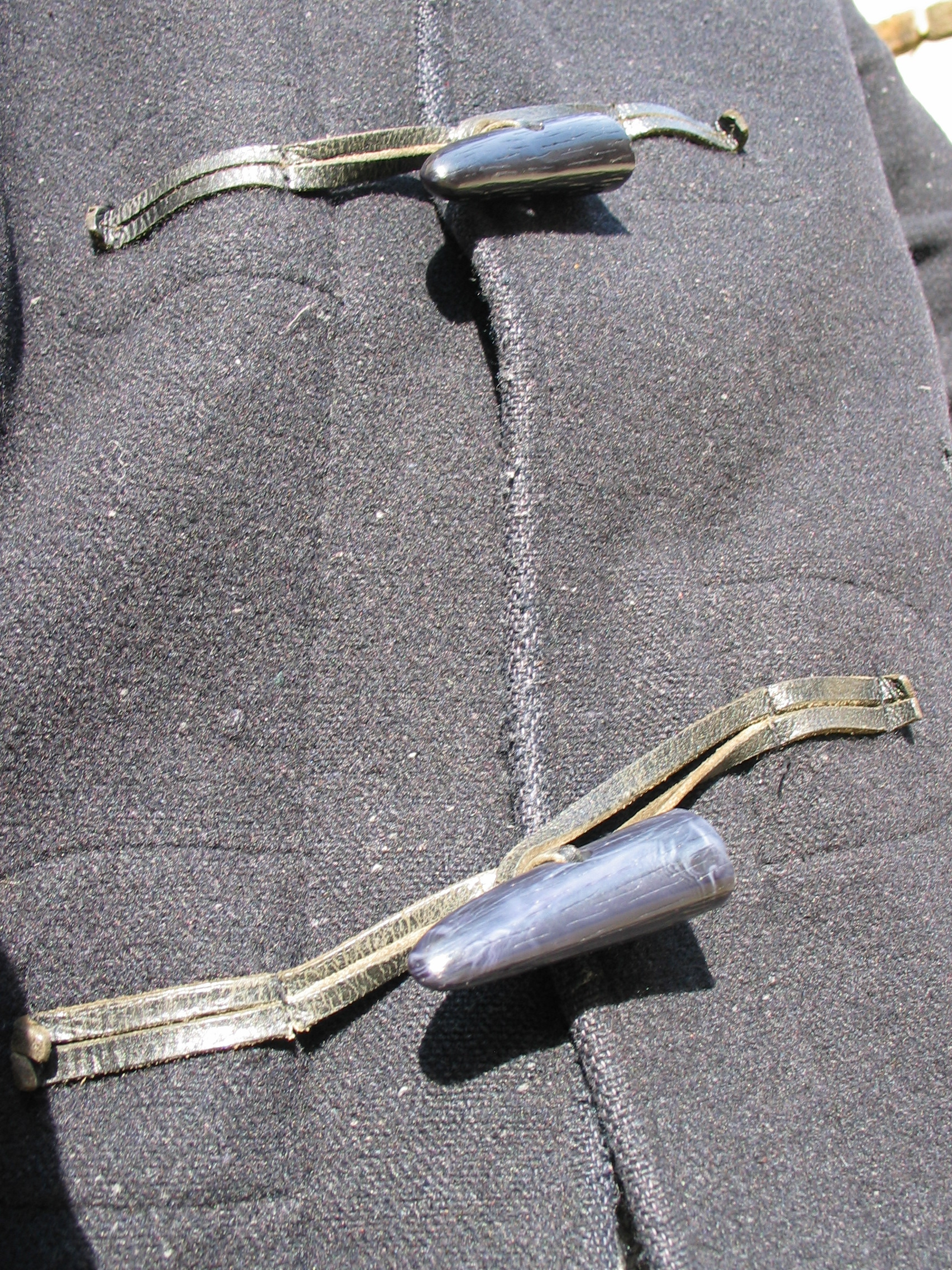
Toggle fastenings

Toggle-and-rope fastenings have been in use since ancient times, in China among other places. The Duffel cloth has been manufactured since about the 1450s in Belgium and since the 1550s in The Netherlands (Leiden). The initial influence of what became the duffel coat, might have been the hooded Polish military frock coat, which was developed in the 1820s. It had the unusual features of a toggle closure and an integrated hood, and by 1850 had spread through Europe.

In the 1890s the British Admiralty purchased the coat in quantity for the Royal Navy from multiple manufacturers, where it was referred to as the "convoy coat". The navy issued a camel-coloured variant during World War I, most probably also made from Melton wool.

The design of the coat was modified slightly and widely issued during World War II. It became known under the nickname "Monty coat".

Large post-war stocks of low-cost military surplus coats turned the duffel into a ubiquitous item of British civilian clothing in the 1950s and 1960s, especially among students. The firm Gloverall purchased large quantities, and in 1954 started producing their own version using leather fastenings and buffalo horn toggles with a double-faced check lining, and many other modern versions copy some or all of those features.

== Today ==
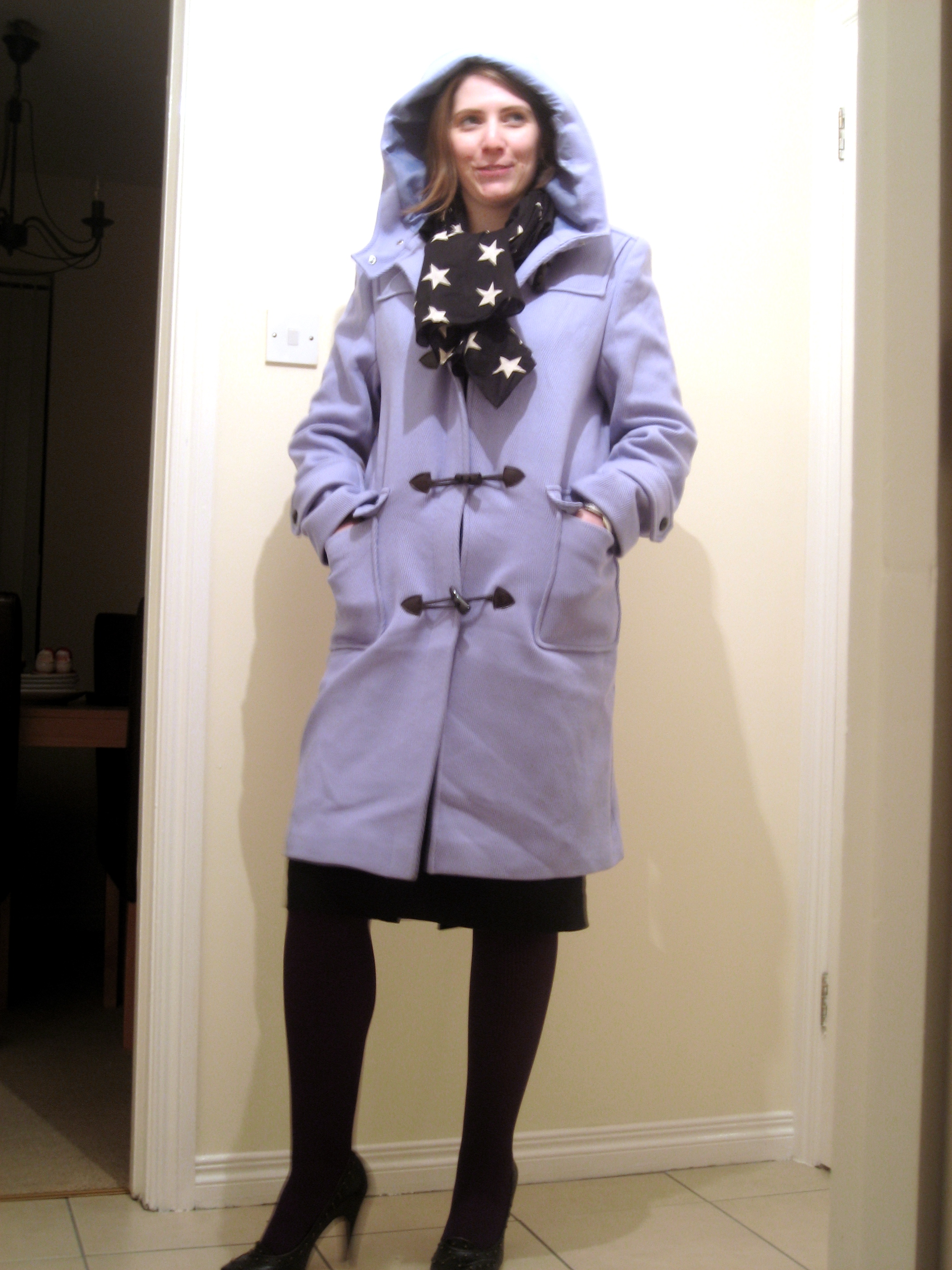
A contemporary duffel-style coat

Today, the duffel coat is often made of Melton cloth, as opposed to modern duffel cloth, which is a softer wool fabric with a distinct nap used for high-end coats and parkas.

In Italy as well as in Greece and The Netherlands, the duffel coat is called a Montgomery, or montycoat, after Field Marshal Sir Bernard Montgomery, who often wore one during World War II.

== In popular culture ==
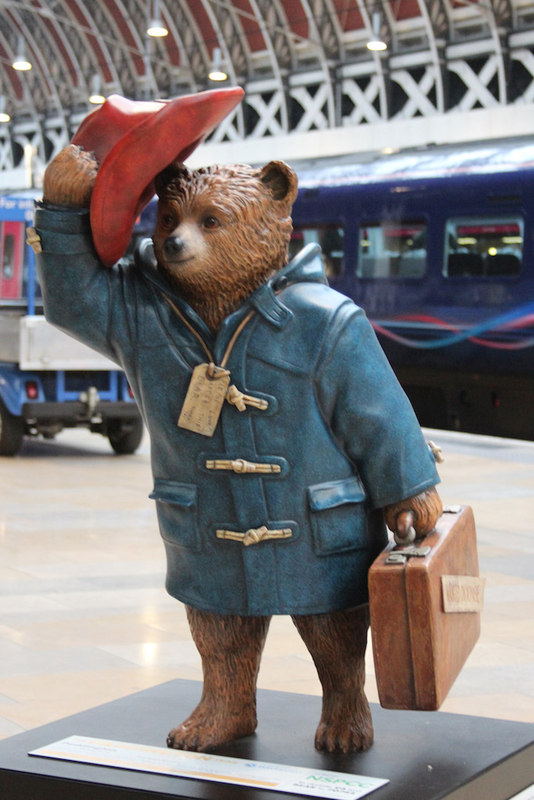
Statue of Paddington Bear in his signature blue duffel coat and red hat at Paddington station, London

British Major Calloway played by Trevor Howard in the 1949 movie The Third Man wears a standard issue Army duffel coat throughout the film.

In the Doctor Who serial The Curse of Fenric, the Seventh Doctor wears a tan duffel coat over his costume.

In the BBC sitcom Only Fools and Horses, Buster Merryfield's character Uncle Albert is often seen wearing his duffel coat along with his signature blue mariner's cap.

In the BBC series Jonathan Creek, part of the titular character's signature look includes a duffel coat, which was from actor Alan Davies's own closet.

Designed by his creator Michael Bond, a blue duffel coat is one of the signature items in Paddington Bear’s wardrobe, alongside a hat that is often depicted as red.
