= Thermal burn =

Burn to the skin caused by any external heat source

A thermal burn is a type of burn resulting from making contact with heated objects, such as boiling water, steam, hot cooking oil, fire, and hot objects. Scalds are the most common type of thermal burn suffered by children, but for adults thermal burns are most commonly caused by fire. Burns are generally classified from first degree up to fourth degree, but the American Burn Association (ABA) has categorized thermal burns as minor, moderate, and major, based almost solely on the depth and size of the burn.

== Causes ==
=== Hot liquids and steam ===
Scalding is a type of thermal burn caused by boiling water and steam, commonly suffered by children. Scalds are commonly caused by accidental spilling of hot liquids, having water temperature too high for baths and showers, steam from boiling water or heated food, or getting splattered by hot cooking oil. Scalding is usually a first- or second-degree burn, and third-degree burn can sometimes result from prolonged contact. Nearly three quarters of all burn injuries suffered by young children are scalds.

=== Fire ===
Fire causes about 50% of all cases of thermal burns in the United States. The most frequent event where people get burned by fire is during house fires encountered by firefighters and trapped occupants, where 85% of all fire deaths take place. Fireworks are another notable cause of fire burns, especially among adolescent males on holidays such as Independence Day in the US. The most common cause of injury by fire or flame in children is touching candle flame. In some regions, such as the western United States, wildfires are responsible for an increase in burn injuries. Wildfires can suddenly shift due to changing wind directions, making it harder for firefighters and eyewitnesses to avoid getting burned.

If clothing catches fire, third-degree burn can develop in a matter of just a few seconds.

=== Hot objects ===
Solid objects that are hot can also cause contact burns, especially in children, who may intentionally touch things they don't know are too hot to touch. Such burns imprinted on the skin usually form a pattern that resembles the object. Sources of burns from solid objects include ashes and coal, irons, soldering equipment, frying pans and pots, oven containers, light bulbs, and exhaust pipes. Hot food like pizza can cause oral burns, which are known as pizza palate.

== Pathophysiology ==
Picture depicting Jackson's Burn Zones.

There are three (or sometimes four) degrees of burns, in ascending order of severity and depth. For more information, see Signs and symptoms. According to Jackson's thermal wound theory, there are three zones of major burn injury:

- Zone of coagulation is the area that sustained maximum damage from the heat source. Proteins become denaturated, and cell death is imminent due to destruction of blood vessels, resulting in ischemia to the area. Injury at this area is irreversible (coagulative necrosis and gangrene)
- Zone of stasis surrounds the coagulation area, where tissue is potentially salvageable. This is the main area of focus when treating burn injuries.
- Zone of hyperemia is the area surrounding the zone of stasis. Perfusion is adequate due to patent blood vessels, and erythema occurs due to increased vascular permeability.

== Prevention ==
It is important to teach children how to avoid fire and scalding. Firefighters and community leaders often lead such programs in schools and clinics.

Smoke alarms installed in homes can reduce deaths resulting from fire by half. Homeowners should change batteries at least once a year and replace smoke alarms every decade. Before fire occurs, a family should practice evacuating the home, and when fire occurs the family must leave the residence immediately (within two minutes). Sources of flame, like matches, should be kept out of children's reach. Stoves, ovens, space-heaters, and candles must not be left unattended, and flammable objects must be kept at least 30 cm away from open flames. Fire extinguishers should be stored in the kitchen, where most house fires start.

To prevent children from getting burned, water temperature must not be set too high when taking baths or washing hands, nonflammable sleepwear should be worn, back burners should be used when cooking something on the stove, and hot foods, drinks, and irons should be kept away from the edge of counter and table. Oven mitts and potholders must be used in handling hot containers. Care should be taken when taking hot foods out of microwave ovens, and covers should be opened gently to reduce the risk of steam burns.

== Treatment ==
The most important first action is to stop the burning process. The source of the burn should promptly be removed (or the patient removed from the source). If the person is on fire, they must be told to stop, drop and roll, or extinguish the fire by covering them with heavy blanket, wool, coat, or rug. Burning clothing should be removed as should all jewelry that could act as a tourniquet as swelling occurs, but burned clothing stuck to the skin must not be removed. Cooling the burn with cold running water has been shown to be beneficial if accomplished within 30 minutes of the injury. The pain or inflammation can then be effectively treated using acetaminophen (paracetamol), or ibuprofen. Ice, butter, cream and ointment cannot be used since they can worsen the burn.

Severe burn patients are often treated through trauma resuscitation, airway management, fluid resuscitation, blood transfusion, wound management, and skin grafting, as well as the use of antibiotics.

== Outcome ==
95% of people hospitalized for thermal burns survive. Survival rates have increased steadily over the last half century due to advances in treatment and better burn centers. Patients with uncomplicated burns have a 99.7% survival rate. Three risk factors—patient age above 60, burns covering more than 40% of the body, and inhalation injury—greatly reduce the odds of survival, which decline to 97% with any one of these complications, to 67% with any two, and to only 10% in cases with all three.

== Epidemiology ==
In the United States, over two million people required medical attention for thermal burns every year. About 1 in 30 of those victims (75,000) are hospitalized for thermal burns every year, with a third of those patients staying in the hospital for more than two months. About 14,000 Americans die each year from burns.

=== Children ===
Thermal burns are one of the most common early childhood injuries. In the United States, burns are the third most common cause of accidental death among children. Nearly 96,000 children around the world died as a result of thermal burns in 2004, and 61,400 died in 2008 from thermal injuries. Deaths from burns dropped by 55% from 1999 to 2011. Burns are the only mode of unintentional injury which more girls suffer from than boys worldwide, including by fire.

== See also ==
- Low-temperature burn
