= Hysteropexy =

Surgery for uterine prolapse that preserves the uterus

- Specialty: Gynaecology (urogynaecology)
- ICD-9-CM: 69.22

Hysteropexy is a surgical operation for uterine prolapse that resuspends the uterus inside the pelvis instead of removing it, as an alternative to hysterectomy with suspension of the vaginal vault. It can be done vaginally, abdominally or laparoscopically, using the patient's own ligaments or synthetic mesh.

Because the uterus is kept, the operation is unsuitable for women with abnormal bleeding or a raised risk of gynaecological cancer.

Randomised trials have found outcomes similar to or better than those of vaginal hysterectomy, with shorter operations and less blood loss.

== Indications ==
Hysteropexy is offered to women with symptomatic uterine prolapse, usually felt as a vaginal bulge, who wish to keep their uterus. The 2019 NICE guideline NG123 lists sacrospinous hysteropexy, the Manchester repair (if no future pregnancy is wanted) and sacrohysteropexy with mesh as options for them.

=== Women wishing to retain fertility ===
Prolapse surgery is usually deferred until childbearing is complete; for women who still want children, only a uterus-sparing repair is possible.

=== Patient preference ===
In a 2013 survey of 213 American women seeking care for prolapse, 36% preferred uterine preservation if outcomes were equal, against 20% who preferred hysterectomy.

== Rationale ==
Prolapse results from failure of the ligaments that support the top of the vagina. The uterus is a passive passenger, so removing it does not in itself correct the defect. Arguments for keeping it include:

- shorter operations and less blood loss;
- less mesh exposure (2.2% after sacral hysteropexy against 7.2% after sacral colpopexy with hysterectomy);
- prolapse outcomes that are not worse.

== Patient selection ==
Assessment before surgery aims to exclude disease of the uterus, cervix or ovaries. Postmenopausal bleeding is the main contraindication: 13% of such women had unexpected endometrial hyperplasia or cancer at hysterectomy despite a negative work-up, against 2.6% of postmenopausal women without bleeding. Endometrial hyperplasia and, relatively, obesity also weigh against the operation.

=== Cervical elongation ===
An elongated cervix can mimic descent of the whole uterus and has been linked to an 11-fold higher risk of failure after sacrospinous hysteropexy.

== Techniques ==
=== Vaginal ===
Sacrospinous hysteropexy, the most studied technique, stitches the cervix to the sacrospinous ligament, usually on the right. The Manchester procedure removes part of the cervix and fixes the remaining uterus to the pelvic ligaments. Uterosacral hysteropexy resuspends the cervix from the patient's uterosacral ligaments.

=== Abdominal and laparoscopic ===
Sacrohysteropexy fixes the uterus or cervix to the sacral promontory, usually with mesh, and is increasingly done laparoscopically. The laparoscopic version takes longer than vaginal mesh hysteropexy.

=== Mesh-augmented vaginal hysteropexy ===
Vaginal mesh kits such as Uphold LITE anchored mesh to the sacrospinous ligaments. They were withdrawn in Australia in 2018 and the United States in 2019.

== Outcomes ==
=== Compared with hysterectomy ===
In the Dutch SAVE U trial of 208 women, sacrospinous hysteropexy was non-inferior to vaginal hysterectomy at one year; at five years, apical failure was 1% against 7.8%. The British VUE trial of 563 women found no difference in symptoms or serious adverse events at one year, though preservation cost £235 more.

In the American SUPeR trial, mesh hysteropexy had fewer failures than hysterectomy at five and ten years (40% against 53%). By contrast, a 2025 Medicare study of women aged 65 or over found more repeat surgery after native-tissue hysteropexy (adjusted hazard ratio 1.52).

=== Compared between techniques ===
In the Dutch SAM trial of 434 women, the Manchester procedure succeeded more often than sacrospinous hysteropexy at two years (87.3% against 77.0%). Across studies, repeat surgery after hysteropexy ranges from 0 to 29%.

=== Complications ===
About 15% of women have buttock pain after sacrospinous hysteropexy, usually transient. Mesh exposure followed 8% of mesh hysteropexies in the SUPeR trial.

=== Pregnancy ===
A 2023 review of 218 pregnancies after hysteropexy found that prolapse recurred in 12% of women, similar to the rate without later pregnancy.

== Epidemiology ==
Vaginal hysterectomy remains the most common operation for uterine prolapse worldwide. In the United States, hysteropexy rose significantly between 2002 and 2012 but stayed uncommon; a 2024 national analysis found it in 11.7% of laparoscopic apical repairs for uterine prolapse. In the Netherlands, uterus-sparing surgery is standard, and 60% of gynaecologists choose sacrospinous hysteropexy first.

== History ==
Abdominal hysteropexy dates from 1886, when Howard Kelly in Philadelphia, and Robert Olshausen and Max Sänger in Germany, began suturing the uterus to the abdominal wall, mainly for retroflexion and prolapse. Such operations were favoured partly because hysterectomy was then far more dangerous.

In 1888 Archibald Donald of Manchester combined vaginal wall repair with amputation of the cervix; William Fothergill refined it into the single Manchester operation, described in 1915. Arthure and Savage reported sacral hysteropexy in 1957, sacrospinous hysteropexy was first performed in 1989, and a laparoscopic sacral hysteropexy was described in 2006. Recognition that the uterus plays a passive role in prolapse has since revived interest.

=== Terminology ===
The word joins the Greek hystera (womb) and pexis (fixation). In 1895 Kelly noted that "ventrofixation" and "hysteropexy" were both widely used, but preferred "suspension of the uterus".
