= William Edward Fothergill =

British physician (1865–1926)

Professor William Edward Fothergill
- Born: 4 October 1865; Southampton, England
- Died: 4 November 1926 (aged 61)
- Education: University of Edinburgh
- Awards: Milner-Fothergill gold medal for contributions to therapeutics
- Scientific career
- Fields: obstetrics gynaecology
- Workplaces: Saint Mary's Hospital, Manchester, Manchester Royal Infirmary
- Thesis: The Ultimate Fate of Placental Tissue retained in Utero (1897)

William Edward Fothergill (4 October 1865 – 4 November 1926) was professor of clinical obstetrics and gynaecology at the University of Manchester.

== Life ==
Fothergill was born in Southampton, England and brought up in Darlington. He came from a family who had a doctor in the family in the previous six generations. His ancestor was the eminent Quaker physician and naturalist John Fothergill and his own branch of the family came from the elder brother of John Fothergill. His family included many members of the Society of Friends.

Fothergill married Edith Fothergill née Woon just after he arrived in Manchester. She was an artist like Fothergill and from Chelsea who enjoyed painting landscapes particularly in the Lake District and the Yorkshire Dales. Edith died in 1920 and her sister Miss Mary Woon became a companion for Fothergill.

== Education ==
In 1882, he enrolled at the University of Edinburgh, where he graduated with a Master of Arts (MA) degree in 1886. Later he achieved a Bachelor of Science in 1888 and then eventually achieving a First-class honours in medicine in 1893 with an MBBS and winning the Buchanan Scholarship in Midwifery and Gynaecology.

After travelling to the university cities of Jena and Paris for post graduate study, Fothergill returned to Edinburgh to complete his residency with appointments at the Royal Infirmary of Edinburgh and the Royal Maternity Hospital. In both hospitals Fothergill worked as a house physician with Alexander Russell Simpson in the gynaecological department at the Infirmary and later as assistant to Simpson at the maternity hospital. In 1897 Fothergill was awarded the Doctor of Medicine again achieving a First-class honours along with the gold medal, with a thesis titled The Ultimate Fate of Placental Tissue retained in Utero, winning the Milner-Fothergill Gold Medal for Contribution to Therapeutics, specifically investigating The Use of the Senecios in Disorders of Menstruation. Fothergill also won an award from the Edinburgh University Club of London for an essay called The Relation of Literature, Science and Philosophy in University Education.

== Career ==
At the end of his study, Fothergill decided to specialise in obstetrics and gynaecology but after examining Edinburgh for opportunities for advancement and establishment of a consulting practice, he found it to be too overcrowded with the medical profession. So Fothergill decided to move to Manchester as the university had a large medical school. At the time this would have been considered an unwise move, as he would not have the backing of the old boy network in Edinburgh and instead would be striking out on his own. However, by sheer skill as a pathologist and working first as a medical artist he managed to become useful to the senior medical men in Manchester and within a few years became known in the Gynaecology wards of Manchester, becoming assistant lecturer to the professor of obstetrics, Sir William Japp Sinclair at the University of Manchester.

Fothergill was appointed to his first medical position in Manchester in 1899 at the Northern Hospital for Women and Children and also in 1899 was appointed as the first director of the clinical laboratory at Manchester Royal Infirmary and was responsible for bringing the laboratory into existence holding the directorship until 1905. During this period at the Royal Infirmary he introduced radiology. In 1904 Fothergill was appointed to Manchester Southern Hospital for Women and Children and when it was amalgamated into Saint Mary's Hospital, Manchester in the same year Fothergill became one of its staff. In 1907 Fothergill was appointed as assistant gynaecological surgeon to the Royal Infirmary and in 1919 became a full surgeon. His academic career at the University of Manchester started in 1901 when he was appointed a lecturer in obstetrics and gynaecology. In 1920, Fothergill was appointed to Professor of Systematic and promoted again in 1925 to Professor of Clinical, Obstetrics and Gynaecology.

== Surgical career ==
Fothergill was a student of Archibald Donald. In 1888 Donald attempted five uterine prolapse operations. The procedure he developed became known as the Manchester repair and originally consisted of an anterior colporrhaphy, amputation of the cervix, followed by a posterior colpoperineorrhaphy. Donald executed the operation sometimes in two sittings.

Fothergill improved on the procedure by modifying it by not always carry out the posterior repair. Fothergill's procedure became popular with gynaecologists which led the procedure becoming known as the Fothergill's Repair. However over time as Donald's pioneering work was recognised, the operation became known as the Manchester operation.

== Bibliography ==
- Fothergill, William Edward (1907). "The supports of the pelvic viscera : a review of some recent contributions to pelvic anatomy, with a clinical introduction". Journal of Obstetrics and Gynaecology: 18–30. OCLC 642642501.
- William Edward, Fothergill (1907). A course of lectures to midwives and maternity nurses. Edinburgh: Green. OCLC 5536242.
- Fothergill, William Edward (1910). Manual of diseases of women. Edinburgh: Green. OCLC 867405820.
- William Edward, Fothergill (1910). An address on the chronic results of septic and gonorrhœal infection of the female pelvic organs. London: Academical Press. OCLC 642642458.
- Fothergill, William Edward (1910). Golden rules of obstetric practice (6 ed.). Bristol: John Wright & Sons. OCLC 220694962.
- Fothergill, William Edward (1922). Manual of midwifery. Edinburgh: Green. OCLC 19492877.
- Fothergill, William Edward (1925). A handbook for midwives and maternity nurses. Edinburgh: Green. OCLC 14749062.
