= Fariba Behnia-Willison =

Iranian-born Australian gynaecologist and pelvic reconstructive surgeon

- Born: Iran
- Education: Ruhr University Bochum (medicine); University of Adelaide (Master of Minimally Invasive Surgery); Flinders University (PhD)
- Occupations: Gynaecologist, pelvic reconstructive surgeon
- Known for: Single-incision laparoscopic surgery in gynaecology Platelet-rich plasma and laser treatment of pelvic floor disorders Autologous blood-derived graft for pelvic organ prolapse Desert Flower South Australia
- Awards: Inspiring South Australian Women's Award (2026); Zonta Women of Achievement Award (2026); Women in Innovation SA Award, Science (2025); Telstra Best of Business Awards, national winner (2023)
- Scientific career
- Fields: Gynaecology, urogynaecology, regenerative medicine
- Workplaces: FBW Gynaecology Plus; Flinders Medical Centre; Flinders University; University of Adelaide / Adelaide University; SmartFem
- Thesis: Pelvic floor repair: novel surgical methods, regenerative medicine, and women's perspectives of scar-less surgery (2021)
- Doctoral advisors: Tara Brabazon; Cameron Phillips
- Website: FBW Gynaecology Plus profile

Fariba Behnia-Willison is an Iranian-born Australian gynaecologist and pelvic reconstructive surgeon based in Adelaide, South Australia. She specialises in pelvic floor medicine, advanced laparoscopy and regenerative medicine, and is a senior consultant at Flinders Medical Centre and a senior lecturer at Flinders University. She founded the women's health practice FBW Gynaecology Plus in 2009, the biomedical company SmartFem in 2012, and in 2018, with her daughter Nadia Willison and colleague Tran Nguyen, the not-for-profit Desert Flower South Australia, which offers free care, including reversal surgery, to survivors of female genital mutilation (FGM).

She is credited with introducing single-incision laparoscopic surgery (SILS) to gynaecology in Australia and with performing the first single-incision hysteropexy, and was among the first in Australia to use and study platelet-rich plasma (PRP) and fractional CO_{2} laser treatment for vaginal atrophy, lichen sclerosus and urinary incontinence. After synthetic pelvic mesh was withdrawn from the market, she developed the Victoria Graft System, a graft made from a patient's own blood for the repair of pelvic organ prolapse. Her practice won two national Telstra Best of Business Awards in 2023, and in 2026 she received South Australia's Inspiring South Australian Women's Award and a Zonta Women of Achievement Award.

Behnia-Willison has described how her early life shaped her career: as a child in Iran she saw her family uprooted by the Iranian Revolution, and after being barred from studying medicine there she left alone for Germany, learned German and qualified as a doctor before emigrating to Australia.

== Early life and education ==
Behnia-Willison was born in Iran, one of six children (four of them girls) to parents Ahmad and Mehrangiz. Her father, who worked for the government under the Shah, was the family's sole earner; her mother had never held a salaried job. She was a child when the 1979 revolution took place—ten years old. She recalls that her father overnight became "an enemy of the state" and was condemned to execution, and that a family elder came to tell her mother to prepare the children's mourning clothes for his funeral. Listening from her bed as her mother asked aloud what she would do "with six children, especially four girls without a father", she made what she calls a vow "that I would find the means to be an independent woman".

The next morning her father returned home and hurried the family into flight: each person was allowed a bag of no more than 2 kg (4.4 lb), and at about 6 pm they climbed into the town's evening garbage truck, which he had arranged to smuggle them out. She learned years later that the man ordered to carry out the execution had spared her father, having recognised him as the benefactor whose charity had supported orphans, among them the executioner and his wife; he gave her father his own bicycle and told him to flee. She has said that the episode explains why "charity and caring for others" became central to her life and career, and she has retold the story of the escape in interviews.

Although the danger passed, the family remained officially labelled "not pro-revolutionary government", which barred them from owning land or businesses and limited their career options. Despite achieving top marks in the university entrance examination, she was not permitted to study medicine and instead trained in nursing. During the Iran–Iraq War the surgeon she was dating, whom she describes as the first love of her life, was killed in a bombing while operating on a soldier, and colleagues urged her father to let her leave the country to rebuild her life and pursue medicine. Her brother Hossain shared his scholarship with her, telling her "we will either survive or die together". She was accepted to study medicine in Bonn, but the authorities were withholding her original school transcripts; when she went to collect their German translation she found that the translator had died, and in the confusion a staff member handed her the originals along with the translation. She left Iran immediately for Germany, without knowing the language.

After a year of intensive study she passed the Studienkolleg certificate required for entry to medical school, graduating as dux. She completed her medical education in Germany, at Ruhr University Bochum, and lived there for eight years. She has traced her interest in women's health to her childhood: her mother had urinary urgency and frequency that she concealed by taking the children to the toilet and pretending that it was they who needed to go, and did not discuss her health even with her husband. She found that women's health was similarly taboo in Germany, where women rarely raised sexual or gynaecological problems even with their doctors. She met her future husband, an Australian, on a three-month trip to Australia to learn English, and after marrying moved to Perth. Finding the same reluctance to discuss pelvic health in Australia, she resolved to become a "voice for vaginas".

== Medical career ==
=== Training ===
In Perth her own pregnancy, and the example of her obstetrician Paul Cohen, led her to specialise in obstetrics and gynaecology. She held resident and registrar posts in Western Australia, the Australian Capital Territory and New South Wales, including at Sir Charles Gairdner Hospital, King Edward Memorial Hospital, The Canberra Hospital, Wagga Wagga Base Hospital and the Royal Hospital for Women in Sydney, completing her specialist training in Sydney and becoming a Fellow of the Royal Australian and New Zealand College of Obstetricians and Gynaecologists (FRANZCOG). She then moved to Adelaide as a fellow in endo-gynaecology and urodynamics at Flinders Medical Centre (2004–2005). She later completed a master's degree in minimally invasive surgery at the University of Adelaide.

=== Flinders Medical Centre and FBW Gynaecology Plus ===
Behnia-Willison has been a senior consultant at Flinders Medical Centre and a senior lecturer in Flinders University's College of Medicine and Public Health since 2006, and was acting head of the hospital's urogynaecology department in 2012–2013. In 2009 she founded FBW Gynaecology Plus, a private women's health practice in Ashford, Adelaide; she has written that it is unusual for a private practitioner to conduct research in their own rooms, given the cost to the business. The practice brings together gynaecologists with physiotherapists, pain specialists, colorectal specialists, urologists, sexologists, nutritionists, naturopaths and counsellors, and she operates at Ashford Hospital, where she has also trained in robotic surgery.

She is affiliated with Adelaide University (formerly the University of Adelaide), where she is an adjunct senior lecturer and collaborates with engineers on tissue scaffolds. She has served on the board of the Australasian Gynaecological Endoscopy and Surgery Society (AGES) and as co-scientific chair of its Pelvic Floor Symposium, and is a councillor of the South Australian branch of the Australian Medical Association, representing gynaecologists.

=== SmartFem ===
In 2012 Behnia-Willison founded SmartFem, an early-stage biomedical engineering company, to commercialise her autologous graft for prolapse repair; she is its chief medical officer. In 2024 the company received a $500,000 Seed-Start grant from the South Australian Government's Research and Innovation Fund to take the Victoria Graft System through regulatory approval in Australia and the United States.

== Research ==
In 2021 she was awarded a PhD by prior publication from Flinders University, supervised by Tara Brabazon and Cameron Phillips, for a thesis by publication that brought together twelve of her previously published works on pelvic floor surgery and regenerative treatment.

=== Laparoscopic and single-incision pelvic floor surgery ===
Her early research, with Elvis Seman, Robert O'Shea and colleagues at Flinders Medical Centre, evaluated laparoscopic paravaginal repair for anterior compartment prolapse. In 2012 she reported the feasibility and operative outcomes of single-incision laparoscopic surgery in gynaecology, in which the operation is performed through a single small incision at the navel, and in 2013 described a laparoendoscopic single-site approach to mesh sacrohysteropexy, a uterus-conserving repair of uterine prolapse. She presented the first single-incision laparoscopic hysteropexy at the Cleveland Clinic in 2011, and at the invitation of Pedro Escobar wrote, with Anirudha Garg, the chapter on single-port urogynaecology and pelvic reconstructive surgery in Springer's Atlas of Single-Port, Laparoscopic, and Robotic Surgery (2014), as its only Australian author. A 2020 study from her practice reported the outcomes of laparoscopic mesh sacrohysteropexy. She has run national workshops on single-incision surgery for gynaecologists and trainees.

With colleagues she also surveyed women's attitudes to "scarless" surgery: a 2010 study in Surgical Endoscopy examined women's views of transvaginal natural orifice transluminal endoscopic surgery (NOTES), and a 2021 study surveyed Middle Eastern women's attitudes to vaginal NOTES (vNOTES).

=== Regenerative treatments ===
Behnia-Willison has said that her shift to regenerative medicine began around 2010 with a 30-year-old patient who, after breast cancer treatment including a double mastectomy, removal of her ovaries and tamoxifen, had severe vaginal atrophy that made intimacy impossible, and who had been told by several gynaecologists that she should simply be glad to be alive. The patient asked her, "What is the meaning of life if there is no quality of life?" Hormone therapy was contraindicated, and Behnia-Willison, who had that day been invited to a demonstration of a PRP "vampire facelift", decided to try injecting the patient's own platelet-rich plasma to regenerate the vaginal tissue. Two months later the patient was able to resume sexual activity, and at her next visit she asked for PRP injections in her face. Behnia-Willison then wrote to general practitioners seeking referrals of similar patients for a study of 100 women, and was surprised at the response: 55 of the first 100 patients were GPs or GPs' wives. She described vaginal atrophy as "the silent epidemic". She later combined PRP with fractional CO_{2} laser treatment, and has written that some colleagues initially dismissed the work on sexual function as "primarily aesthetic".

Her group published studies of PRP for vulvovaginal lichen sclerosus (2016), fractional CO_{2} laser for the genitourinary syndrome of menopause (2017) and for stress urinary incontinence (2019), the combination of PRP and laser for stress incontinence (2020) and for complications of transvaginal mesh (2025), and percutaneous tibial nerve stimulation for overactive bladder (2023). The 2017 laser study and the 2016 lichen sclerosus study are her most cited papers. In her thesis she acknowledged that larger randomised controlled trials were needed before such treatments could be accepted as standard practice, and in 2025 her group published the protocol for a randomised controlled trial of PRP against saline for vulvar lichen sclerosus and a scoping review of PRP in gynaecology.

=== Autologous blood-derived graft ===
After synthetic pelvic mesh was withdrawn from the market in 2017, leaving surgeons to rely on native-tissue repairs with failure rates of 37–50 per cent, Behnia-Willison began developing an autologous graft to reinforce prolapse repairs. Inspired by tissue engineering for cartilage repair and by a PRP-based membrane used in tendon surgery, she developed a formulation combining blood products, hyaluronic acid, fat and stem cells. Being commercialised by SmartFem as the Victoria Graft System, it had been used in more than 400 cases by 2024, with a reported efficacy above 90 per cent at up to five years; by 2025 the AMA's South Australian branch reported that it had received Therapeutic Goods Administration approval and had been used in more than 500 patients. With engineers at the University of Adelaide she has published laboratory and animal studies of the biocompatibility and degradation of human blood-derived scaffolds, and she has filed a US patent application for a scaffold for soft-tissue augmentation and reinforcement. She is developing a biodegradable version of the graft as part of a second doctorate.

=== Other work ===
With the forensic pathologist Roger Byard she wrote an overview of female genital mutilation for forensic practitioners (2024). Outside medicine, she co-authored conference papers on feedback–feedforward control systems with the engineer Morteza Mohammadzaheri in 2009–2010.

== Advocacy and charity work ==
In 2018 Behnia-Willison founded Desert Flower South Australia, a not-for-profit charity offering free, multidisciplinary medical, surgical and psychological care to survivors of female genital mutilation, with her daughter Nadia Willison and her colleague Tran Nguyen. The idea came from Nadia, who devoted her 21st birthday to raising funds for the centre. The anti-FGM campaigner Khadija Gbla has served as an ambassador for the centre. Behnia-Willison performs FGM reversal surgery at Ashford Hospital, and uses fat grafting and regenerative treatments to treat scarring; the centre also treats transgender women and war victims with genital trauma. By May 2023 she had seen more than 100 FGM survivors in Australia, about a quarter of them with complications, and by 2026 the centre had supported more than 500 women, offering care in Persian, Dari and German.

She has presented her methods of FGM reversal at the Desert Flower Center in Berlin, and in 2021 the Women's Health and Research Institute of Australia agreed in principle to establish a Desert Flower centre in Sydney, for which she was to train four gynaecologists. In 2023 she planned to travel with Nadia to Kenya to teach the reversal procedure to local doctors. She has said that "FGM is happening in our own backyard", and has called for better training of health workers to recognise and care for survivors.

Behnia-Willison argues that women's health beyond childbearing is a "forgotten area", noting that most women's health funding goes to fertility treatment, and that "a woman's worth must not be tied solely to her reproductive status". She has called for menopause clinics, GP training, school-based health education and sex-specific research, and for government funding and streamlined regulation of South Australian women's health innovations. In 2023 she told ABC News that a conventional prolapse repair failure rate of 30–50 per cent was "not acceptable", and that "you don't want to treat any woman as a condition — a woman who sits in front of you is a person". She has said she hopes to expand Desert Flower nationally and to establish clinics in Iran and Vietnam.

== Awards and honours ==
Year	Award or honour	Awarding body	Ref.
1989	Dux, Studienkolleg	University of Bonn	
2008	Burns–Alpers Award	Flinders University	
2023	Telstra Best of Business Awards, South Australian winner: Accelerating Women and Championing Health (to FBW Gynaecology Plus)	Telstra	
2023	Telstra Best of Business Awards, national winner: Accelerating Women and Championing Health (to FBW Gynaecology Plus)	Telstra	
2023	Diversity in Medicine Award	Australian Medical Association	
2023	Dedicated Service Award	Arta Iranian Cultural Centre, South Australia	
2024	Seed-Start grant ($500,000, to SmartFem)	Government of South Australia	
2025	Women in Innovation Award, Science category	Women in Innovation SA	
2026	Inspiring South Australian Women's Award	Australia Day Council of South Australia and Office for Women	
2026	Women of Achievement Award, Medicine	Zonta International (Adelaide)	

At the Inspiring South Australian Women's Award she was described as "a trailblazer in women's health whose innovative care has changed the lives of over 40,000 women across Australia". The Women in Innovation award was presented at the 2025 awards ceremony addressed by the Governor of South Australia on 10 November 2025, and the Zonta award at a ceremony hosted by the Lord Mayor of Adelaide at Adelaide Town Hall on 11 March 2026.

== Personal life ==
Behnia-Willison speaks English, German, Persian and Dari.

== Selected publications ==
- Behnia-Willison, Fariba; Seman, Elvis I.; Cook, Jennifer R.; O'Shea, Robert T.; Keirse, Marc J. N. C. (2007). "Laparoscopic paravaginal repair of anterior compartment prolapse". Journal of Minimally Invasive Gynecology. 14 (4): 475–480. doi:10.1016/j.jmig.2006.12.002.
- Strickland, Andrew D.; Norwood, Michael G. A.; Behnia-Willison, Fariba; Olakkengil, Santosh A.; Hewett, Peter J. (2010). "Transvaginal natural orifice translumenal endoscopic surgery (NOTES): a survey of women's views on a new technique". Surgical Endoscopy. 24 (10): 2424–2431. doi:10.1007/s00464-010-0968-3.
- Behnia-Willison, Fariba; Foroughinia, Leila; Sina, Maryam; McChesney, Phil (2012). "Single incision laparoscopic surgery (SILS) in gynaecology: feasibility and operative outcomes". Australian and New Zealand Journal of Obstetrics and Gynaecology. 52 (4): 366–370. doi:10.1111/j.1479-828X.2012.01443.x.
- Behnia-Willison, Fariba; Reza Pour, Nina; Mohamadi, Behrang; Willison, Nadia; Rock, Madeleine; Holten, Ian W.; O'Shea, Robert; Miller, Joseph (2016). "Use of platelet-rich plasma for vulvovaginal autoimmune conditions like lichen sclerosus". Plastic and Reconstructive Surgery – Global Open. 4 (11): e1124. doi:10.1097/GOX.0000000000001124.
- Behnia-Willison, Fariba; Sarraf, Sara; Miller, Joseph; Mohamadi, Behrang; Care, Alison S.; Lam, Alan; Willison, Nadia; Behnia, Leila; Salvatore, Stefano (2017). "Safety and long-term efficacy of fractional CO_{2} laser treatment in women suffering from genitourinary syndrome of menopause". European Journal of Obstetrics & Gynecology and Reproductive Biology. 213: 39–44. doi:10.1016/j.ejogrb.2017.03.036.
- Behnia-Willison, Fariba; et al. (2019). "Fractional CO_{2} laser for treatment of stress urinary incontinence". European Journal of Obstetrics & Gynecology and Reproductive Biology: X. 1: 100004. doi:10.1016/j.eurox.2019.100004.
- Behnia-Willison, Fariba; Nguyen, Tran T. T.; Rezaeimotlagh, Adel; Baekelandt, Jan; Hewett, Peter J. (2021). "Middle Eastern women's attitudes and expectations towards vaginal natural orifice transluminal endoscopic surgery (vNOTES): a survey-based observational study". Surgical Endoscopy. 35 (12): 6865–6872. doi:10.1007/s00464-020-08193-0.
- Behnia-Willison, Fariba (2021). Pelvic floor repair: novel surgical methods, regenerative medicine, and women's perspectives of scar-less surgery (PhD thesis). Flinders University.
- Byard, Roger W.; Behnia-Willison, Fariba (2024). "Female genital mutilation – an overview for forensic practitioners". Journal of Forensic and Legal Medicine. 101: 102624. doi:10.1016/j.jflm.2023.102624.
- Willison, Nadia; et al. (2025). "Platelet-rich plasma and fractional CO_{2} laser therapy to reduce surgical intervention for symptomatic vaginal mesh-related complications". International Urogynecology Journal. 36 (4): 903–912. doi:10.1007/s00192-025-06123-z.
- Behnia-Willison, Fariba; Aryan, Pouria; Salehnia, Mojdeh; Willison, Nadia; Nguyen, Tran T. T.; Tansu, Nelson; Abbott, Derek (2025). "In vivo investigation of xenotransplanted human blood-derived scaffold into mice as a biodegradable construct for improvement of pelvic floor repair". Frontiers in Bioengineering and Biotechnology. 13: 1627538. doi:10.3389/fbioe.2025.1627538.
- Behnia-Willison, Fariba; Aryan, Pouria; Salehnia, Mojdeh; Willison, Nadia; Nguyen, Tran; Tansu, Nelson; Abbott, Derek (2026). "In vitro evaluation of biocompatibility and degradation of human blood-derived scaffolds by seeding of mouse embryo fibroblasts". PNAS Nexus. 5 (3): pgag069. doi:10.1093/pnasnexus/pgag069.
