= Women in Innovation SA Award =

South Australian awards for innovative women

Women in Innovation SA Awards
- Description: Innovation by women in South Australia
- Sponsored by: Women in Innovation SA (WINN)
- Location: Adelaide, South Australia
- Country: Australia
- First award: 2014
- Website: womenininnovation.com.au

The Women in Innovation SA Awards, originally the Winnovation Awards and also known as the WINN Awards, are annual awards presented by Women in Innovation SA (WINN), a not-for-profit organisation that supports innovative women in South Australia across all sectors. First presented in 2014, the awards recognise South Australian women, and businesses that support them, in categories spanning science, technology, engineering, the arts, mathematics, government, social impact and regional life. By 2025 the awards had recognised more than 600 finalists and 120 winners.

== History ==
Women in Innovation SA began as a volunteer group led by Lisa Kennewell, and held its second annual awards ceremony on 10 November 2015. Later presidents have included Nicole Swaine (2018) and co-presidents Melinda Parent and Cassandra Zaina (2025). The Governor of South Australia is the organisation's patron.

The awards ceremony has been held at the National Wine Centre of Australia in Adelaide, including in 2018, 2022 and 2025. The 2020 and 2021 ceremonies were held online; the 2021 event was broadcast from Stone & Chalk and hosted by ABC Radio Adelaide presenter Ali Clarke. In 2024 WINN partnered with the South Australian Government and the Fearless Females Network on the inaugural Fearless Innovator Grants, worth up to $30,000 each, whose recipients were announced alongside the 2024 awards.

== Categories and eligibility ==
In 2015 the awards were presented in science, technology, engineering, arts, maths, open, and regional, rural and remote categories, together with a business category, the Innovative Women's Initiative in Business Award. Emerging Innovator and Innovation in Government categories had been added by 2016, Social Impact by 2017, and Young Innovator by 2020. First Nations Innovation and Sustainability categories were introduced in 2025.

As of 2016, individual entrants had to be female residents of South Australia, and business entrants had to operate an office in the state that supported female employees. Entrants could be nominated or nominate themselves, had to be financial members of Women in Innovation SA, paid a fee for each category entered, and could win in only one category.

== Recipients ==
Women in Innovation SA Award recipients
Year	Recipient(s)	Category	Affiliation	Ref.
2015	Nicole Pratt	Science		
2015	Emily Rich	Technology		
2015	Karen Nelson-Field	Engineering		
2015	Simone Kain	Arts		
2015	Sam Moyle	Maths		
2015	Amber Cordeaux	Open	Channel 44	
2015	Nayana Parange	Regional, Rural and Remote		
2015	Karen Brown	Innovative Women's Initiative in Business		
2016	Allison Cowin	Science	University of South Australia	
2016	Shelley Elder	Technology	Axeze Pty Ltd	
2016	Karen Reynolds	Engineering	Flinders University	
2016	Chloe Gardner	Arts	Kids Camera Action	
2016	Bronwyn Gillanders	Regional, Rural and Remote		
2016	Gemma Munro	Women's Initiative in Business	Inkling Women	
2016	Bianca Peta	Open		
2016	Gail Fairlamb	Innovation in Government	Department of the Premier and Cabinet	
2016	Claudine Bonder	Emerging Innovator	Centre for Cancer Biology	
2017	Elizabeth Donaldson	Arts	Brick and Mortar Creative	
2017	Michelle Perugini	Emerging Innovator	Life Whisperer	
2017	Melanie MacGregor	Engineering	University of South Australia	
2017	Jennie Fluin	Innovation and Intrapreneurship in Government	Department of Environment, Water and Natural Resources	
2017	Marina Pullin	Maths and Data		
2017	Kate Fennell	Rural, Regional and Remote	University of South Australia	
2017	Caitlin Byrt	Science		
2017	Louise Nobes	Social Impact	Inspired BUY	
2017	Heike Ebendorff-Heidepriem	Technology	OptoFab	
2017	Amy Orange	Women's Initiative in Business	Harvest Fair	
2017	Jane Schueler	Open	TEA HQ	
2018	Anika Johnstone	Arts	University of South Australia	
2018	Allison Nikula	Emerging Innovator	CareApp	
2018	Yan Zhuge	Engineering	University of South Australia	
2018	Bernadette Eckermann	Innovation and Intrapreneurship in Government	SA Water	
2018	Tina Du	Maths and Data	University of South Australia	
2018	Michele Lally	Rural, Regional and Remote	Australian Micro Abattoirs	
2018	Chia-Chi Chien	Science	University of South Australia	
2018	Fiona Arney and Leah Bromfield	Social Impact	University of South Australia	
2018	Mary-Louise Rogers	Technology	Flinders University	
2018	Renly Lim	Open	University of South Australia	
2019	Katharina Richter	Science	University of Adelaide	
2019	Kelly Carpenter	Technology	Lookinglass	
2019	Dorothea Dumuid	Maths	University of South Australia	
2019	Hazel Vandeleur	Rural, Regional and Remote	University of South Australia	
2020	Manuela Klingler-Hoffmann	Science	University of South Australia	
2020	Lyndsey Jackson	Technology	Platfarm	
2020	Kelly Keates	Engineering	Zonge Engineering; Liquid Integrity Systems	
2020	Celia Craig	Arts	Artaria	
2020	Katie Gloede	Maths and Data	Adelaide Football Club	
2020	Alice Jones	Regional, Rural and Remote	University of Adelaide	
2020	Eddie Blass	Open	Inventorium	
2020	Allys Todd	Emerging Innovator	ValAi	
2020	Serena Yang	Innovation and Intrapreneurship in Government	Green Industries SA	
2020	Tanya Weiler	Social Impact	University of South Australia	
2020	Kira Bain	Young Innovator		
2021	Kathy Smart	Arts	Joy Everafter Stories	
2021	Amal Osman	Emerging Innovator	Flinders University	
2021	Helen Banwell	Science	University of South Australia	
2021	Alice Fitch	Technology	Whola	
2021	Amanda Mader	Engineering	Vine Scout	
2021	Menasha Thilakaratne	Maths and Data	University of Adelaide	
2021	Carly Ascott	Rural, Regional and Remote	Bushfire Kids Connect	
2021	Carmen Garcia	Social Impact	Community Corporate	
2021	Nina Sivertsen	Open	Flinders University	
2021	Mary Kelly	Young Innovator	Reusably	
2021	Susie Jones	Innovation and Intrapreneurship in Government	SA Water	
2022	Deb James	Engineering	Resonate Consultants	
2023	Sarah Scholten	Science		
2023	Mel McDowall	Technology		
2023	Sue Abbott	Engineering		
2023	Emily Gann and Libby Trainor Parker	Arts		
2023	Caroline Tiddy	Maths and Data	University of South Australia	
2023	Farzana Kastury	Rural, Regional and Remote	University of South Australia	
2023	Andrea Manclús Clemente	Emerging Innovator	Finch Restorations	
2023	Franke Agenbag	Innovation and Intrapreneurship in Government		
2023	Tiffany De Sousa Machado	Social Impact		
2023	Michelle Tuckey	Open		
2023	Ishika Mahajan	Young Innovator		
2025	Fariba Behnia-Willison	Science	FBW Gynaecology Plus	

== See also ==
- List of awards honoring women
