= Thomas Radford =

Dr Thomas Radford (1793-1881) was a medical doctor in Manchester. He was an important figure in the development of Saint Mary's Hospital, Manchester.

Radford was born in Hulme Fields and was apprenticed to his uncle, William Wood, at the Manchester Lying-in Charity in 1810. He joined the hospital in 1818 as a man-midwife; from 1834 he was house surgeon extraordinary; from 1841 until his death in 1881 he was the consulting physician, and from 1874 also chairman of the board of management. He was an early advocate of Caesarean section.

He gave his medical library and collection to the hospital in 1853, with £1,000, interest on which was devoted to its upkeep. He also donated £2,670 to pay for a medical officer to attend the sick poor of Hulme Fields. He was drawn around Manchester in a yellow chariot with two good horses. The Radford Library from Saint Mary's Hospital (early obstetrical and gynaecological literature) was donated to the Manchester Medical Society's library in 1927; the medical library amalgamated with the library of the university in 1930.

Some of Radford's papers are held by the University of Manchester Library.
