= Manchester Royal Infirmary =

Hospital in Manchester, England

Coordinates: 53°27′44″N 2°13′35″W

- Manchester University NHS Foundation Trust
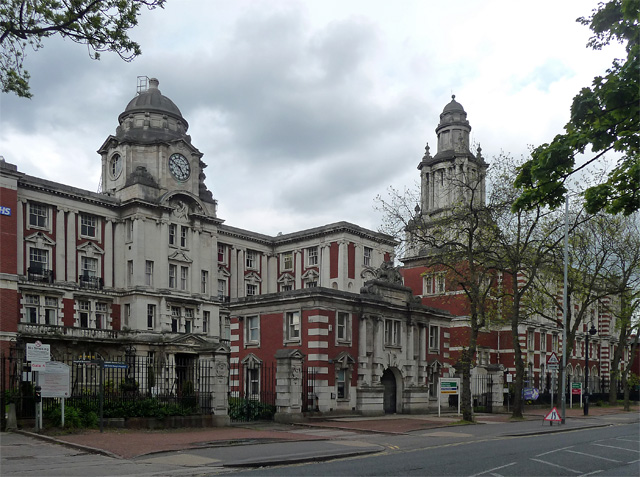
- MRI's main block on Oxford Road

- Shown in Greater Manchester

Geography
- Location: Chorlton on Medlock, Manchester, United Kingdom

Organisation
- Care system: Public NHS
- Type: Teaching
- Affiliated university: Manchester Medical School

Services
- Emergency department: Major Trauma Centre
- Beds: 770

History
- Founded: 1752

Links
- Website: https://mft.nhs.uk/mri/
- Lists: Hospitals in the United Kingdom

Manchester Royal Infirmary (MRI) is a large NHS teaching hospital in Chorlton-on-Medlock, Manchester, England. Founded by Charles White in 1752 as part of the voluntary hospital movement of the 18th century, it is now a major regional and national medical centre.

It is the largest hospital within Manchester University NHS Foundation Trust, and based on its Oxford Road Campus in central Manchester where it shares a site with the Royal Manchester Children's Hospital, Manchester Royal Eye Hospital and Saint Mary's Hospital as well as several other educational and research facilities. The hospital is also a key site for medical education within Manchester, serving as a main teaching hospital for the School of Medical Sciences, University of Manchester.

== History ==
The first premises was a house in Garden Street, off Withy Grove, Manchester, which were opened on Monday 27 July 1752, financed by subscriptions. Government of the institution was in the hands of the trustees. Any subscriber who paid 2 guineas a year was a trustee. Those who donated 20 guineas became trustees for life. The trustees appointed physicians and surgeons by voting. In 1835, 900 trustees assembled to vote in the town hall. Joseph Jordan was elected, having secured 466 votes.

There were initially three physicians and three surgeons, Charles White being one. White co-founded the Infirmary with local industrialist Joseph Bancroft in 1752, and was an honorary surgeon there until 1790. One patient, John Boardman, who had scrofula, was treated. The first inpatient was admitted on 3 August, Benjamin Dooley, aged 12, had "sordid ulcers in the leg". In 1753 it was decided to purchase surgical instruments and to establish a dispensary.

=== New Infirmary ===
==== Opening of the new hospital ====
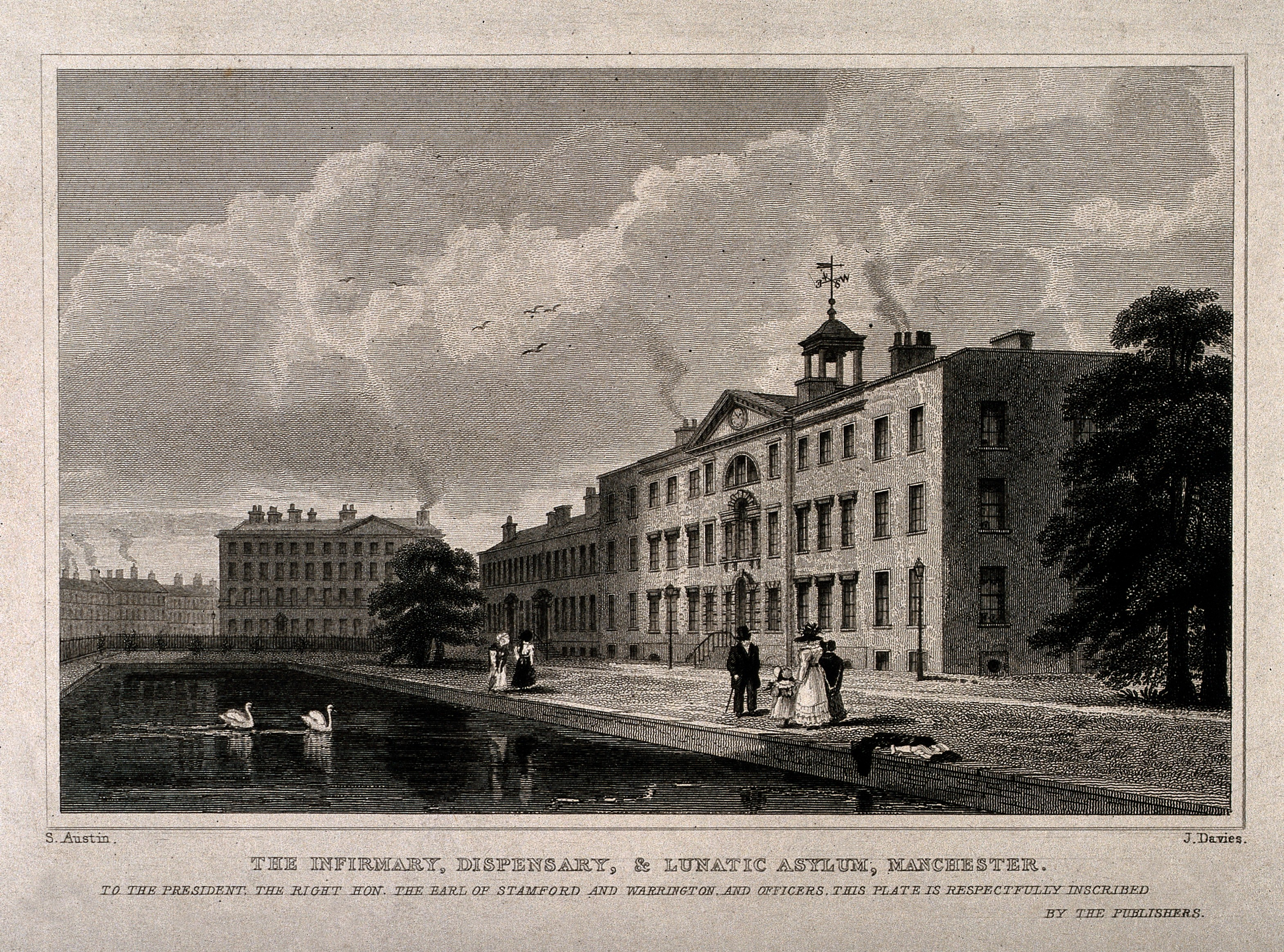
The Infirmary, Dispensary, and Lunatic Asylum, Manchester; by James Hey Davies

It was decided to build a new hospital in 1753 on land leased from Sir Oswald Mosley, lord of the manor, who granted a 999-year lease at an annual rent of £6. The site had previously been called the Daub Holes: these pits, 615 feet long, had filled with water and they were replaced by a fine ornamental pond.

The new premises had space for eighty beds and were on Lever's Row in the area now known as Piccadilly Gardens (the gardens were only created after the demolition of the former MRI buildings in 1914). The new building was opened on 9 June 1755. It had three stories and cellars. The first student, John Daniel, was taken on as an apprentice to the apothecary. By 1756 it was already necessary to add a new wing to the north to house a laundry and wash house. In 1764 there were 85 inpatients. Patients sometimes shared a bed.

==== Manchester Lunatic Asylum ====
The building of the Manchester Lunatic Asylum on the same site as the main hospital was completed in 1765. In 1849 it was removed to Cheadle, Cheshire.

==== Public baths ====
In 1779 public baths were built on the site. Cold baths were 6d (2½p), a Buxton bath 1/- (5p), a warm bath 1/-, and a vapour bath or use of the seating room 5/- (25p). Prices were doubled on Sunday. It was also possible to pay an annual fee. The baths were very popular and profitable. People with venereal disease were not allowed in the Buxton Baths, which were heated to 92 °F (33 °C). and held 3,400 gallons. The Matlock Bath held 6,200 and was also heated to 92 °F (33 °C). William and Ann Howarth were appointed to run the baths in 1799, and they were subsequently known as Howarth's Baths. A steam engine was installed for pumping and heating water for the baths and the hospital. During 1808 4,654 baths were taken by the public – not counting those taken by anyone belonging to the infirmary. In 1813 the waterworks company agreed to supply water to the baths and hospital free of charge. In 1836 the bathman was paid £160, and an additional allowance for washing towels. The average annual profit was £95. In 1845 it was decided to close the baths.

==== 18th-century development ====
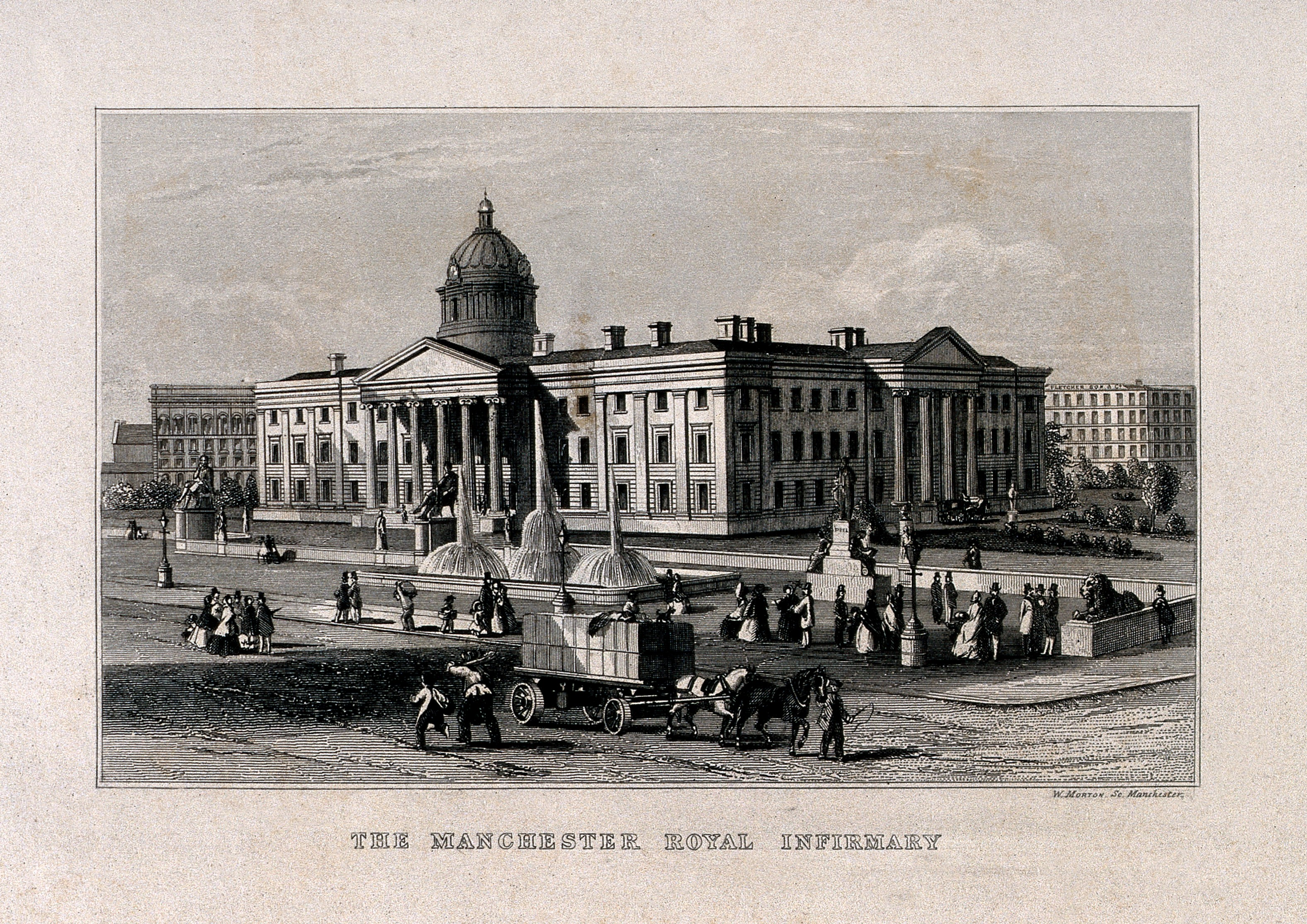
Manchester Royal Infirmary in the 19th century at the Piccadilly Gardens site

A scheme for inoculating poor people for smallpox was started in 1784. They were attended, when necessary, in their own homes, as were people with contagious diseases. Jenner's scheme of vaccination was enthusiastically adopted in 1800, and 1,000 people were vaccinated in six months. In 1790 two physicians were appointed to deal with home visits. A new building for out patients and the dispensary was completed and the hospital was officially titled "The Infirmary, Dispensary, Lunatic Hospital and Asylum in Manchester". There were now six physicians and six surgeons. A library was established in the Infirmary in 1791. Dr John Ferriar, one of the physicians, helped to set up a Board of Health which rented 4 houses in Portland Street belonging to the Lunatic Asylum for use as a fever hospital. It was called the House of Recovery and patients from the rest of the infirmary were moved there if they had infectious diseases.

In 1793 a new north wing was built, with room for 50 more beds. In 1824 the board noted that it had become impossible to admit all the patients in need of care. Erysipelas had become a problem on surgical wards as a result of overcrowding. £5,600 was raised to fund further extensions, which were opened in 1828. The extension included nurses kitchens, 8 water closets, a wash house and laundry, and an accident room and surgery. There were now "upwards of 180 beds", but the surgical wards were still overcrowded and patients were forced to share beds.

==== 19th century ====
Manchester Royal Infirmary Act 1842
- Act of Parliament
- Parliament of the United Kingdom
- Long title: An Act to extend the Provisions of an Act of the Forty-eighth of King George the Third, relative to the Manchester Royal Infirmary, Dispensary, and Lunatic Hospital or Asylum; and to incorporate the Trustees thereof.
- Citation: 5 & 6 Vict. c. i

Dates
- Royal assent: 22 April 1842

Other legislation
- Amends: Manchester Infirmary Act 1808

Text of statute as originally enacted

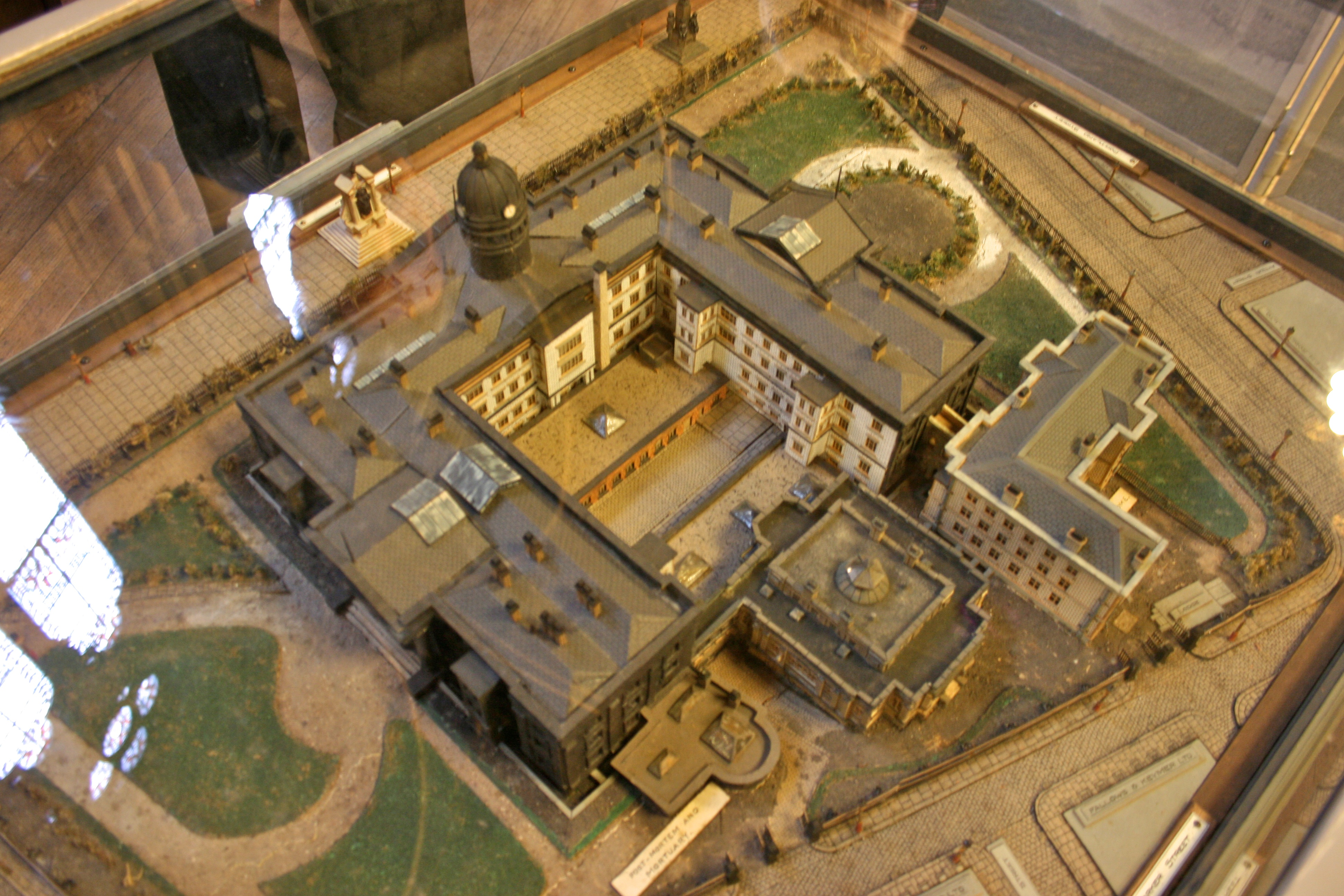
A model of the former premises in the present-day Piccadilly Gardens

The infirmary was renamed the Manchester Royal Infirmary Dispensary, Lunatic Hospital and Asylum in 1830. Jenny Lind gave two concerts for the benefit of the funds in December 1848 allowing the construction of new wings to proceed.

Arrangements with Devonshire Royal Hospital and Southport Promenade Hospital for convalescent care were established. In 1867 Cheadle Hall was first rented and then purchased and equipped for the care of 30 convalescent patients. It was renamed the Barnes Convalescent Home in recognition of a donation of £10,000 by Robert Barnes.

Monsall Hospital was established in North Manchester in 1871 as a fever hospital. Robert Barnes donated £9,000 and the hospital was named the Barnes House of Recovery. Manchester City Council contributed £500. The total cost was £13,000. There was accommodation for 128 fever patients and room to separate patients with different infections.

Telephones were first installed in 1880, free of charge by courtesy of the Lancashire and Cheshire Telephone Company, a clinical laboratory erected in the grounds in 1898, and x-rays began in 1904. The x-ray machine was housed in the chapel as no other space could be found.

In 1832 two new porticos, each with four Ionic columns, had been completed. By the late 19th century statues had been installed on the esplanade on the northern side while the streets to the south beyond Parker Street were narrow.

Organised admission of medical pupils began in 1793. The fee for the first six-month session was 5 guineas, and for two subsequent sessions 3 guineas with extra fees payable to surgeons for attendance at operations. in 1817 fees for apprentices were 200 guineas, paid after completion of a three-month probation period. Apprenticeship lasted at least 5 years and the fee covered board and lodging. They were increased to 260 guineas in 1824 Students in the 19th century were awarded external degrees by the University of London. A catalogue of the library was compiled by Frank Renaud and published in 1859.

=== Oxford Road ===
==== Opening of the new hospital ====
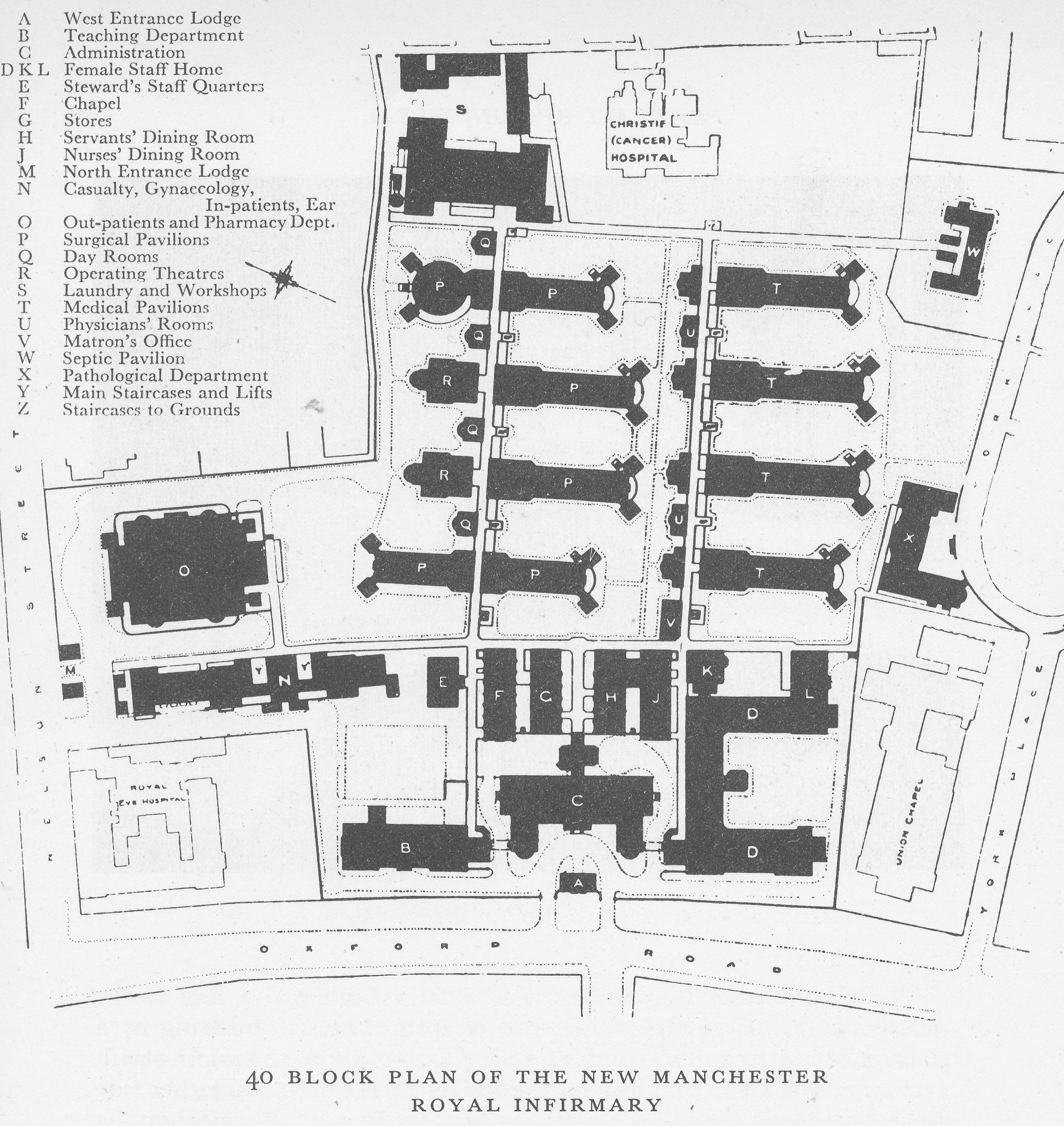
Plan of Manchester Royal Infirmary at the Oxford Road site

Discussions about moving the infirmary to its present site in Oxford Road started in 1875, and a plan was finally agreed in 1904. The Picadilly site was sold to the City Council for £400,000 and plans for new buildings designed by Edwin Hall and John Brooke were accepted after a competition. It was officially opened by King Edward VII on 6 July 1909.

A radiology department was not envisaged in the plans, but Dr Barclay, appointed in 1909, established a department in the basement. In 1913 more than 5,000 patients were examined radiologically. Radiotherapy for cancer patients started in 1914 and Manchester and District Radium Institute was established in a building next to the hospital in 1921. In 1930 a new nurses' home, Sparshott House, was built. It was not until 1933 that the official title of the hospital was changed to the Manchester Royal Infirmary.

==== Second World War ====
On 28 August 1939 400 patients were evacuated and 440 beds prepared for expected casualties. By November 1939, in the absence of the expected casualties all the beds were brought back into use. A large emergency blood transfusion centre was established and continued after the war.

A high explosive bomb penetrated the new nurses' home, Sparshott House, on 11 October 1940. 112 nurses were in the basement shelters, but nobody was hurt. However, none of the rooms could be used and the nurses had to sleep elsewhere, including in the university. Within a month 130 bedrooms were back in use. The biggest raids on Manchester were on 22 and 23 December 1940. On the first night very few actually struck the hospital buildings but most of the windows were blown out. 10,000 panes of glass had to be replaced. On the first night 186 casualties were admitted and 400 more treated in the casualty and first aid posts. On the second night a time bomb fell on the X-ray and teaching block which exploded on the following day, 24 December, leading to significant disruption.

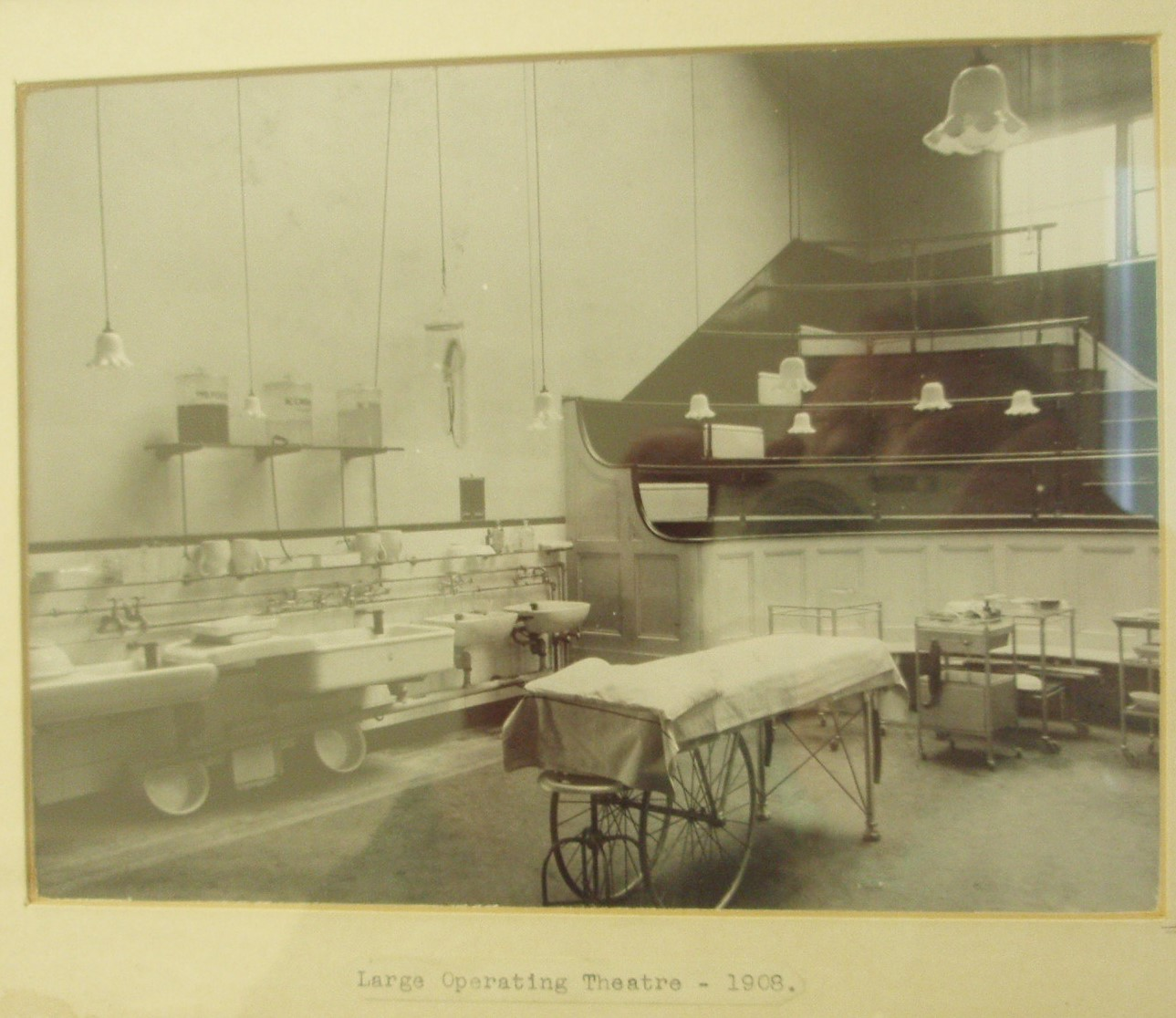
Manchester Royal Infirmary large operating theatre 1908

==== Post-war ====
In 1950 a new neurology and neurosurgery unit was built, with its own operating block.

Throughout the early 1970s the department of radiology was a pioneer of X-ray computed tomography under consultant neuroradiologist Dr Ian Isherwood. In 1972, the MRI became the first hospital in the world to obtain a commercially available CT scanner, the 'EMI CT1000', following the development of the prototype at Atkinson Morley Hospital in London the year before. In 1975 the department received the first whole-body CT scanner in Europe, the EMI CT5000.

Summary statistics
Year	Admitted	Cured	Died	Outpatients	Costs
1752	75	42	3	249	£405
1762	402			841	£1,169
1777	473		21	1,256	
1802	705		50	3,470	£4,000
1848	2,056		191	18,200	£8,400
1852					£8,400
1863	1,730				
1874	2,735				
1885	4,500			21,700	
1902	4,500			35,800	
1913	9,049			55,900	
1919	11,550		7%	44,071	
1933	11,928		5.8%	51,000	
1946–47	10,845		5.5%	54,184	£400,000

== Services ==
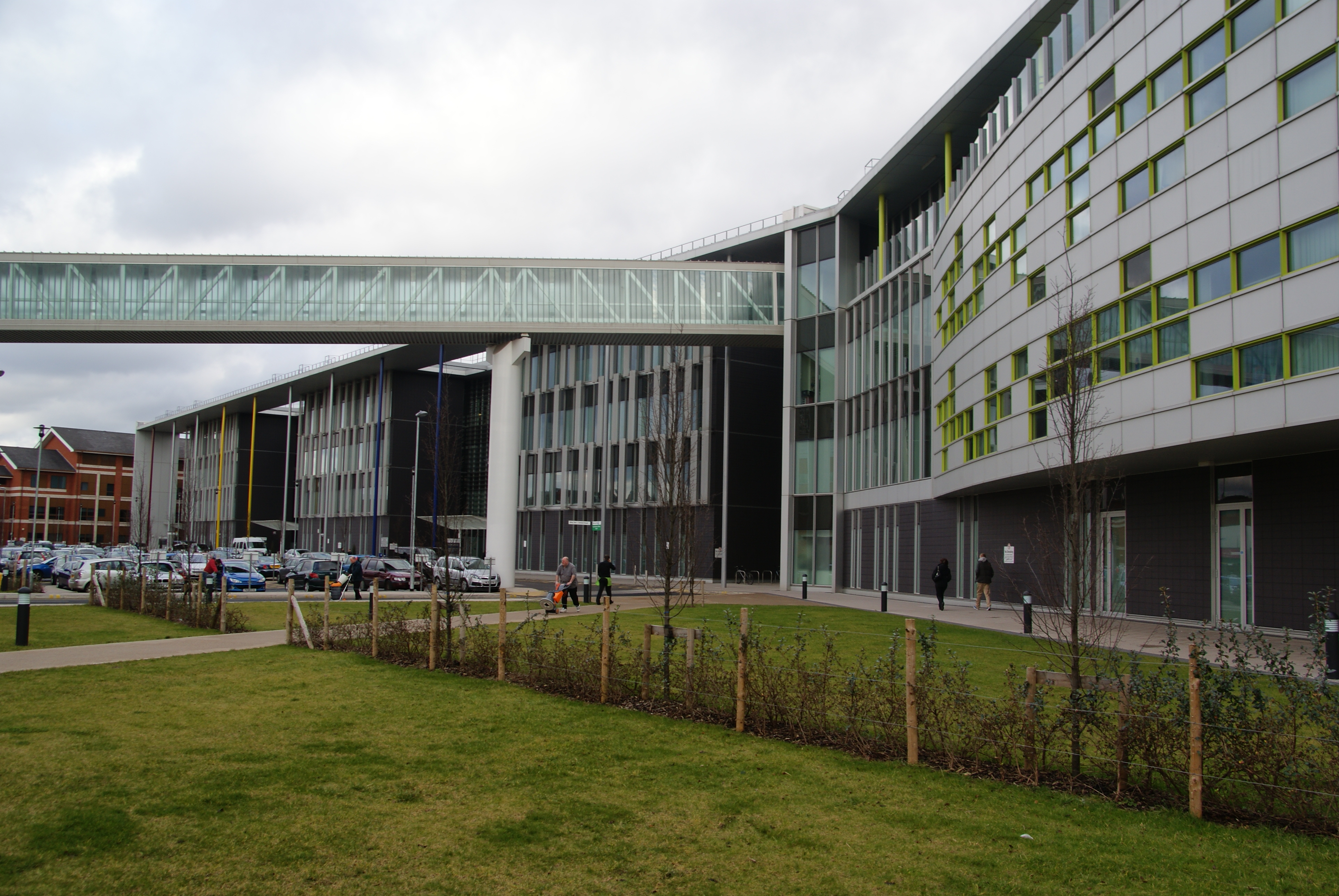
The west side of the modern main block at Manchester Royal Infirmary

Manchester Royal Infirmary offers services in most major medical and surgical specialities. Patients are referred from across the region and beyond for services such as Kidney and Pancreas transplants, Vascular surgery, Major Trauma, Hepatobiliary surgery, Rheumatology, and HIV care. Its Emergency Department deals with around 145,000 patients every year. The transplant team carried out 317 transplants in 2015, the most of any centre in the UK.

On the same site on the Oxford Road campus, St Mary's Hospital provides services for Obstetrics and Gynaecology, Manchester Royal Eye Hospital provides Ophthalmology services, and the Royal Manchester Children's Hospital provides Paediatric services. Nearby, there are close links with Wythenshawe Hospital which provide complimentary services such as Cardiothoracic surgery including heart transplantation and Plastic Surgery.

== Notable staff ==
- Archibald Donald (1860-1937), Consultant Gynaecological Surgeon, notable for co-creating the Manchester Repair operation for Uterine prolapse.
- Ethel Gordon Fenwick (1857–1947) founder of the Royal British Nurses' Association in 1887 and a leader in the campaign for the state registration of nurses in the UK
- Lucy Duff Grant (1894–1984), matron (1929 to 1955), president of the Royal College of Nursing (1951 to 1953), president of the National Council of Nurses (1951 to 1957), vice president of the International Council of Nurses (1953 to 1957) and elected member of the General Nursing Council for England and Wales (1937 to 1955).
- Peter Mark Roget (1779–1869), creator of Roget's Thesaurus, was a Physician at Manchester Infirmary between 1806 and 1808.
- Margaret Sparshott (1870–1940), Lady Superintendent of Nurses (i.e. matron) 1907 to 1929, founding member of the Royal College of Nursing and later president from 1931 to 1933
- Charles White (1728-1813), co-founder of the hospital. Physician and Surgeon who made important contributions in the fields of orthopaedics, surgery, and obstetrics.

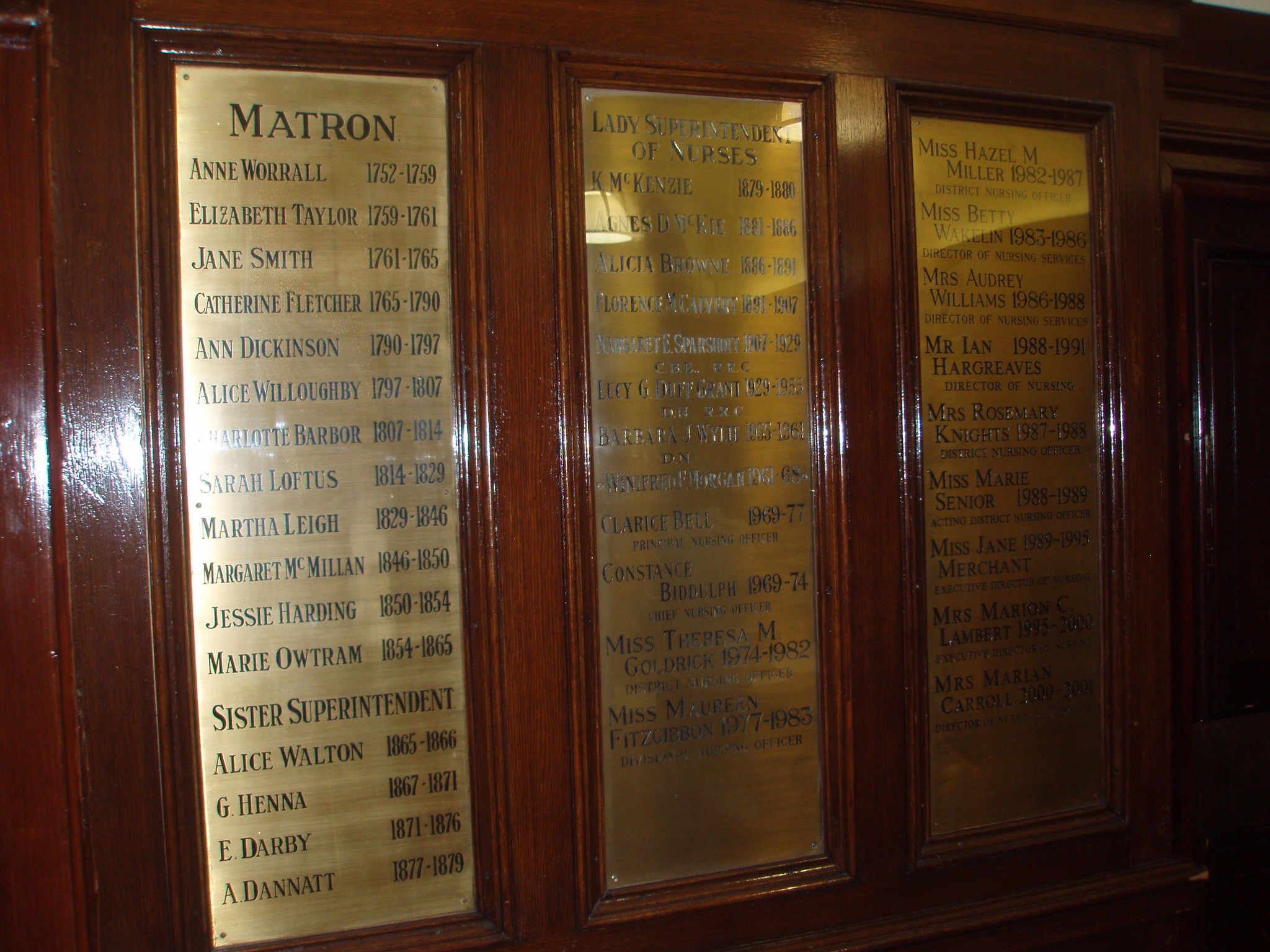
Plaques listing Matrons of Manchester Royal Infirmary

== See also ==
- Healthcare in Greater Manchester
- List of hospitals in England
