= Catherine White (doctor) =

Catherine White, OBE, is a forensic physician and the clinical director of St Mary's Sexual Assault Referral Centre in Manchester, England. She is a specialist in the treatment of sexual assault and rape victims.

== Career ==
White was inspired to improve the services available to sexual assault and rape victims after hearing a story of a woman who had been raped and unable to find a suitable female doctor to conduct an examination. She subsequently trained in this specialism, and became a forensic physician in 1995, specialising in examining people. White became the clinical director for St Mary's Sexual Assault Referral Centre (SARC) in 2003, which was the first sexual assault referral centre (SARC) to open in the UK in 1986. Her work at the centre involves treating both women and men, and providing psychological care in addition to forensic services.

White serves on the academic committee of the Faculty of Forensic and Legal Medicine, which she represents on national committees. She has previously held the position of vice president, forensic medicine, of the faculty, and is the current deputy chief examiner, sexual offences medicine. White is one of the examiners appointed by the Worshipful Society of Apothecaries to oversee the Diploma in the Forensic and Clinical Aspects of Sexual Assault (DipFCASA).

In 2006, 2008 and 2010, UNICEF and the Child Exploitation Online Protection Centre (CEOP) sponsored White to provide training in Cambodia and Moldova. She has also worked with the UN to develop sexual assault services in Palestine.

In June 2013, the work of White and St Mary's SARC was featured in a BBC documentary, The Unspeakable Crime: Rape.

In 2016, BBC Radio 5 Live Breakfast presenter Rachel Burden nominated White as an inspirational woman for whom she would like to see a wikipedia page created as part of the BBC 100 Women campaign.

== Awards and honours ==
White was appointed a member of the Order of the British Empire (OBE) in the New Year Honours list 2014 for her services to vulnerable people.
