= Caroline Tiddy =

Australian geologist and academic researcher

- Education: Monash University
- Occupation: Geologist
- Employer: University of South Australia
- Known for: Geology, Science communications
- Title: Associate Professor
- Website: https://people.unisa.edu.au/Caroline.Tiddy

Caroline Jane Tiddy is an Australian geologist and academic researcher, an associate professor at the University of South Australia, who has won awards in Canada and Australia and published on gender diversity in geosciences.

== Education ==
Tiddy received a Masters of Science, and a PhD from Monash University. Her thesis was titled "High-temperature metamorphism in poly-deformed orogens a case study of the Proterozoic Broken Hill Block, Australia".

== Career ==
Tiddy is an associate professor in geosciences at the Future Industries Institute at the University of South Australia. She is actively involved in developing innovative technologies for mineral exploration, particularly focusing on critical metals like copper. Her research includes creating sensor technologies for real-time geochemical data collection in drill holes and developing geochemical targeting tools to increase mineral deposit discovery success rates. These efforts are part of her work with the Mineral Exploration Cooperative Research Centre (MinEx CRC), which aims to advance mineral exploration through industry-led research. In 2022, she was the professorial lead of the Future Industries Institute at Mawson Lakes.

Tiddy was the president of the Geological Society of Australia, and is a strong advocate for gender diversity in STEM,

"Along with my research into metal detection technology, I am a strong advocate for diversity and inclusion in STEM and am actively researching the enablers and barriers women face within geosciences. My aim is to help workplaces create gender equity."

Tiddy is a member of WOMEESA, and has published on gender diversity in Earth Sciences.

== Publications ==
Select publications include:

Handley, HK, Hillman, J, Finch, M, Ubide, T, Kachovich, S, McLaren, S, Petts, A, Purandare, J, Foote, A & Tiddy, C 2020, 'In Australasia, gender is still on the agenda in geosciences', Advances in Geosciences, vol. 53, pp. 205–226.

Brotodewo, A, Tiddy, C, Zivak, D, Fabris, A & Giles, D 2021, 'Geochemical discrimination of igneous zircon in the Gawler Craton, South Australia', Australian Journal of Earth Sciences, vol. 68, no. 4, pp. 557–579.

Tiddy, CJ & Giles, D 2020, 'Suprasubduction zone model for metal endowment at 1.60-1.57 Ga in eastern Australia', Ore Geology Reviews, vol. 122, article no. 103483, pp. 1–30.

Forbes, C, Giles, D, Freeman, H, Sawyer, M & Normington, V 2015, 'Glacial dispersion of hydrothermal monazite in the Prominent Hill deposit: an exploration tool', Journal of Geochemical Exploration, v. 156, pp. 10–33.

== Awards ==
- 2022 – Superstars of STEM award, Science & Technology Australia.
- 2021 – Garry Davidson Award for Excellence, Geological Society of Australia.
- 2019 – Finalist: Maths and Data Category, Women in Innovation Awards.
- 2017 – Third Place, Frank Arnott Award (Experienced Category) Prospectors and Developers Association of Canada.
- 2012 – Walter Howchin Medal, Geological Society of Australia SA Division.
