= Roger Byard =

Australian professor of medicine and forensic pathologist

Roger Byard AC PSM FAHMS
- Born: Roger William Byard; 1955 or 1956 (age 70–71); Tasmania, Australia
- Education: University of Tasmania
- Known for: Research on sudden infant death and forensic pathology
- Awards: Companion of the Order of Australia (AC); Public Service Medal (PSM)
- Medical career
- Field: Forensic pathology Pathology; Legal medicine
- Institutions: University of Adelaide; Forensic Science South Australia
- Website: www.adelaide.edu.au/directory/roger.byard

Roger William Byard (born 1955–1956) is an Australian forensic pathologist, academic and medical researcher. He is an emeritus Professor of Pathology at the University of Adelaide and a Senior Specialist Forensic Pathologist at Forensic Science South Australia. His research has focused on sudden infant death and forensic pathology. He was appointed a Companion of the Order of Australia in 2025 for eminent service to medicine, forensic pathology and tertiary education.

== Early life and education ==
Byard was born in Hobart, Tasmania and he grew up in the town of Wynyard, in north-west Tasmania.

He studied medicine at the University of Tasmania, graduating with a Bachelor of Medicine, Bachelor of Surgery and Bachelor of Medical Science in 1978. His postgraduate clinical training included aeromedical work with the Royal Flying Doctor Service in the Northern Territory, and he trained in family practice and pathology in Canada, qualifying as a Licentiate of the Medical Council of Canada (LMCC) in 1982. He also holds advanced degrees: a Doctor of Philosophy (PhD), Doctor of Medicine (MD) and Doctor of Science (DSc) (2020) from the University of Tasmania.

== Academic and professional career ==
After qualifying as a general practitioner in Canada, he returned to Australia. In 1985 while working as a hospital registrar, he developed an interest in forensics when he was tasked with performing his first autopsy.

Byard served as the George Richard Marks Chair of Pathology at the University of Adelaide from 2006 until he retired in July 2023, when he was appointed emeritus professor by the university's Council. He has been a Senior Specialist Forensic Pathologist with Forensic Science South Australia since 1998, and he has visiting academic positions, including as visiting professor at the University of Belgrade and as professorial fellow at the Florey Institute of Neuroscience and Mental Health.

He has been editor-in-chief of the international journal Forensic Science, Medicine and Pathology since 2008.

=== Research ===
Byard's principal research has looked into sudden infant and early childhood death, particularly sudden infant death syndrome (SIDS), and he contributed to defining risk factors and preventive approaches which are used internationally. His research has also investigated accidental deaths, histologic methods for dating injuries, and markers for freshwater drowning.

His SIDS research built on the epidemiological investigations of the paediatrician Susan Beale, to establish the links between babies sleeping on their fronts and sudden death. In 1991, he co-chaired a scientific review meeting with Fiona Stanley to address the issue. In the 1990s and 2000s, he collaborated with Harvard University to identify a neuropeptide chemical called "Substance P" which occurs in five areas of the brainstem. This chemical helps to control the response to low oxygen levels (two areas) and head and neck movement (three areas). This chemical was lacking in some infants, meaning that babies with low oxygen levels to the brain were not able to lift their heads, contributing to SIDS cases in infants who sleep face-down.

=== Well-known cases ===
In addition to his academic research, he has worked with forensic teams in Australia and internationally. This started during his first week on call as a resident, when the police Major Crimes unit requested that he assist with examining human remains which had been found in barrels, in what came to be known as the “Snowtown murders”. He assisted with victim identification efforts following the 2002 Bali bombings and the 2004 Boxing Day tsunami. He has also been called to act as an expert witness and a proponent in judicial systems, including as an expert witness in the re-trial of Sally Clark in the UK - she had been convicted in 1999 of killing her two children. The original conviction was based on the opinion of a paediatrician who claimed that a double cot death would only occur once every hundred years. Byard's analysis showed that significant information had been missed, and that infection was involved in the babies' deaths. Clark's convictions were overturned in 2003.

== Published works ==
Byard has published extensively, including peer-reviewed journal articles, book chapters, and textbooks. The specific number of publications is given differently by different sources. As of January 2026, Researchgate lists 1,378 publications by Byard. Meanwhile, Scopus lists 1,150 publications and calculates an h-index of 56, while ORCID lists 846 publications of his. He also co-hosted his own true-crime podcast, Guardians of the Dead, in conjunction with The Advertiser and the University of Adelaide.

His published books include:

- Byard, Roger W. (1993). Sudden Natural Death in Infancy and Early Childhood: An Analysis of Aetiological Mechanisms and Pathological Features. University of Adelaide, Department of Paediatrics.
- Byard, Roger W. (1997). Accidental Childhood Death in South Australia from 1963 to 1996. University of Adelaide, Department of Paediatrics.
- Byard, Roger W.; James, R.; Lipsett, J.; Gilbert, J. (1998). Farm and Tractor-related Fatalities in Children in South Australia.
- Byard, Roger W.; Bourne, A. J. (1999). Childhood Deaths and Cargo Barriers in Cars.
- Byard, Roger W (January 2001). Byard, Roger W; Krous, Henry F (eds.). Sudden Infant Death Syndrome: Problems, Progress & Possibilities. Arnold.
- Byard, Roger W.; Felgate, P.; Klitte, Å; Gilbert, J. D. (2002). Gasoline Exposure in Motor Vehicle Accident Fatalities.
- Riches, K. J.; Byard, Roger W.; Gilbert, J. D.; James, R. A. (2002). Fatal Childhood Vascular Injuries Associated with Seat Belt Use.
- Byard, Roger W.; Gilbert, J. D. (2004). Characteristic Features of Deaths Due to Decapitation.
- Byard, Roger W. (2004). Sudden death in infancy, childhood, and adolescence (2nd ed.). Cambridge; New York: Cambridge University Press. ISBN 9780521825825.
- Byard, Roger W. (2010). Sudden death in the young (3rd ed.). Cambridge: Cambridge University Press. ISBN 9780521516617.
- Prahlow, Joseph A.; Byard, Roger W. (2012). Atlas of Forensic Pathology: For Police, Forensic Scientists, Attorneys, and Death Investigators. New York: Springer : Humana Press. ISBN 9781617790577.
- Byard, Roger (2012). Atlas of Forensic Pathology. Springer.
- Collins, K.A.; Byard, Roger (2014). Forensic pathology of infancy and childhood. New York: Springer. ISBN 978-1-61779-402-5.
- Byard, Roger W.; Payne-James, Jason (2015). Encyclopedia of Forensic and Legal Medicine: 1-4 (2nd ed.). Saint Louis: Elsevier Science. ISBN 9780128000342.
- Byard, Roger W.; Duncan, Jhodie R. (2018). SIDS - Sudden Infant and Early Childhood Death: The Past, the Present and the Future. Adelaide: University of Adelaide Press. ISBN 9781925261684.
- Byard, Roger; Collins, Kim A. (2020). Geriatric forensic medicine and pathology. Cambridge University Press. ISBN 978-1-108-83747-7.

== Honours and recognition ==
Byard's honours include:

- Public Service Medal (PSM) in 2004 for outstanding service to paediatric pathology.
- Humanitarian Overseas Service Medal in 2006.
- Officer of the Order of Australia (AO) in 2013 for distinguished service to medicine and forensic pathology.
- Elected as a Fellow of the Australian Academy of Health and Medical Sciences in 2016.
- Named the global leader in the field of Forensic Science research The Australian's 2021 Research magazine.
- Justice Ted Mullighan Outstanding Case Award at the Forensic Science SA Awards in 2023.
- Companion of the Order of Australia (AC) in 2025 for "eminent service to medicine, to forensic pathology, to tertiary education as an academic and researcher, and to the community".
