= Saint Mary's Hospital, Manchester =

Hospital in Manchester, England

St Mary's Hospital
- Manchester University NHS Foundation Trust
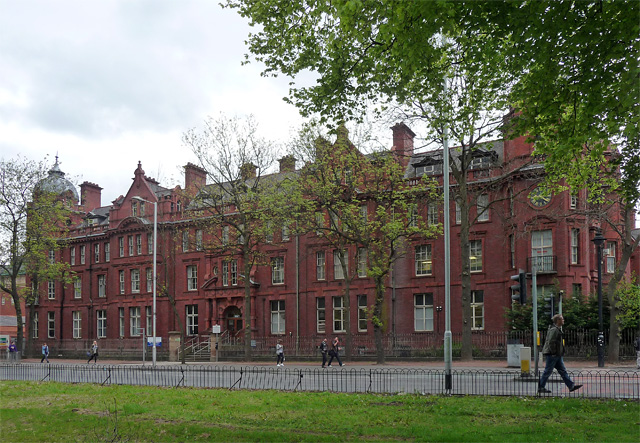
- St Mary's Hospital

- Shown in Greater Manchester

Geography
- Location: Manchester, England
- Coordinates: 53°27′34″N 2°13′31″W

Organisation
- Care system: NHS
- Type: Specialist

Services
- Emergency department: Neonatal and sexual assault emergency centre
- Speciality: Paediatric, obstetrics & gynaecology (genetics)

History
- Founded: 1790

Links
- Website: mft.nhs.uk/saint-marys
- Lists: Hospitals in England

Listed Building – Grade II
- Official name: St Mary's Hospital
- Designated: 6 June 1994
- Reference no.: 1246550

St Mary's Hospital is a hospital in Manchester, England. It is part of Manchester University NHS Foundation Trust. Founded in 1790, St Mary's provides a range of inter-related services specifically for women and children. In 1986, St Mary's Sexual Assault Referral Centre was the first sexual assault referral centre (SARC) to open in the UK.

== History ==
The hospital was founded in 1790 by Dr Charles White in a house in Old Bridge Street, Salford, as the "Lying-in Charity". Five years later in 1795 the charity became the Manchester Lying-in Hospital; it was accommodated however in the Bath Inn, Stanley Street, Salford. Midwifery training for women was provided from the beginning. The building was felt to be very suitable. The bar was used as the apothecary's shop. Inpatient accommodation was available for widows, deserted wives, and those whose homes were unsuitable. Eighty were admitted in 1791/92. In 1799/1800 there were 177 and 800 home patients. The charity maintained a list of midwives, who were paid two shillings and sixpence for each delivery. In 1819 it moved to smaller premises at 18 King Street, Manchester, but moved back to Stanley Street in 1822.

White's collection of 300 pathological specimens was given to the hospital after his death in 1813. It was available for inspection by the public. In 1840 the charity moved to 2 South Parade, which cost £813. There was a disastrous fire there in 1847 which destroyed most of White's collection. In 1854 it changed its name to St Mary's Hospital and Dispensary for the Diseases peculiar to Women and also for the Diseases of Children under six years of age.

From 1855 to 1903, it occupied a new building on Quay Street which was erected at the expense of Dr Thomas Radford. It cost £4,300 and had 80–90 beds, 25 or 30 of which were for children. Home visiting of sick women and children, and clinical teaching of students from Owens College began at this time. Radford had joined the hospital in 1818 as a man-midwife; from 1834 he was house surgeon extraordinary; from 1841 until his death in 1881 he was the consulting physician, and from 1874 also chairman of the board of management.

In 1904 the hospital was amalgamated with the Manchester Southern Hospital for Women and Children and two new hospitals were built. One was in Whitworth Street West on the corner of Oxford Street, designed by Alfred Waterhouse and built between 1899 and 1901. It had an octagonal tower and a circular ward block on three floors of 43 feet (13 m) diameter. There were three separate dining rooms – for doctors, for nurses, and for ancillary staff. The other hospital on Oxford Road in Chorlton-on-Medlock opened in April 1911. The hospital also had a School of Nursing that certified midwives. In 1910 the first female house surgeon was appointed. In 1915 the city centre hospital provided maternity and outpatient services and had 56 maternity beds and 50 cots, with accommodation for medical students, midwives and pupil nurses. The suburban hospital provided gynaecological and paediatric services and contained 115 beds.

A clinic for venereal disease was opened in 1919 and antenatal clinics were instituted in 1923. A formal co-operation arrangement was made with the Manchester Royal Infirmary in 1939 which resulted in the gynaecological department being transferred from the infirmary to St Mary's and a shared nursing staff and training school instituted.

During the Second World War most patients were moved, first to Blackpool and then to Collar House in Prestbury, Cheshire, well away from the city centre. Prestbury Hall and later Adlington Hall were also used. At the start of the NHS in 1948 it formed part of The United Manchester Hospitals.

A new hospital was constructed on Hathersage Road between 1966 and 1970 at a cost of over £3 million. The wards were housed in a tower block with laboratories and the antenatal clinic in a podium. Each ward had 4 four-bedded rooms with nine single rooms, three nurseries, each with six cots, a day room and a utility room. Regional facilities – a special care baby unit, the medical genetics centre and in vitro fertilisation services were developed.

In 1986 St Mary's Sexual Assault Referral Centre (SARC) was established; the first SARC to open in the UK. In June 1994, St Mary's Hospital was designated a Grade II listed building. In 2003 Catherine White became clinical director of St Mary's SARC.

In 2009 paediatric (excluding neonatal) services from St Mary's Hospital were transferred to the newly re-built Royal Manchester Children's Hospital, which opened on 11 June 2009.

== Services ==
=== Clinical ===
More than 1,200 staff, including doctors, nurses, midwives, clinical and non-clinical support staff work in St Mary's Hospital. A range of clinical and non-clinical support services are based at the site to support the work undertaken, including well established departments of radiology and physiotherapy. 9,267 babies were delivered in 2015/16.

=== Sexual Assault Referral Centre ===
St Mary's Sexual Assault Referral Centre (SARC) is a rape crisis centre, treating both men and women in the immediate aftermath of or any time after a rape or sexual assault, and provides psychological care in addition to forensic services.

=== Library ===
The Radford Library was transferred from St Mary's Hospital to the Manchester Medical Society's library in 1927. It included early obstetrical and gynaecological literature collected by the surgeon Dr Thomas Radford and donated to the hospital by him, together with an endowment. Dr Radford also donated his obstetrical museum.

== See also ==
- Healthcare in Greater Manchester
- List of hospitals in England
- Listed buildings in Manchester-M13
