= Manchester operation =

- Other names: Fothergill operation
- Specialty: Gynaecology

The Manchester operation, Manchester repair or simply Fothergill operation is a technique used in gynaecologic surgeries. It is an operation for uterine prolapse by fixation of the cardinal ligaments. Its purpose is to reduce the cystourethrocele and to reposition the uterus within the pelvis. The major steps of the intervention are listed below:

1. Preliminary dilatation and curettage
2. Amputation of cervix
3. strengthening the cervix by suturing cut end of Mackenrodt ligament in front of cervix
4. Anterior colporrhaphy
5. Posterior colpoperineorrhaphy

High amputation of cervix during this procedure may cause cervical incompetence.

== Prognosis ==
Success rate of Manchester operation was re-evaluated at the Department of Obstetrics and Gynecology of Hacettepe University School of Medicine, Ankara, Turkey for clinical characteristics, complications, and satisfaction scores of patients. A high degree of acceptance/satisfaction and a low morbidity rate show the Manchester operation to be a good option for the treatment of uterine prolapse in women who wish to keep their uterus.

== See also ==
- Genital modification and mutilation
