= Bristol Unicornfest =

2023 art exhibition in Bristol, England

Unicornfest was a public arts trail in Bristol, England to celebrate the 650th anniversary of Bristol. The trail featured 60 giant unicorn sculptures designed by artists, designers and local talent. The unicorns were placed in various locations around Bristol, but some were further afield in Weston-super-Mare, Cheddar Gorge and Chew Valley Lake. Over 40 artists had created 60 unicorns between them.

The Unicorns were on display from 2 July until 2 September 2023. In addition to the Unicorns, 40 foals were on display having been decorated schools, colleges, nurseries and community groups.

Unicorns have been a symbol of Bristol since the 17th century and can be seen on top of County Hall, on the SS Great Britain, along with many other locations across the city.

After the trail closed, the Unicorns would be on display at the Unicorn Farewell Festival from 22 to 24 September before being auctioned off on 5 October with money raised going to Leukaemia Care.

== Previous trails ==
Unicornfest was first announced on 8 September 2022 and follows four previous sculpture trails in the city: Wow! Gorillas in 2011, Gromit Unleashed in 2013, Shaun in the City in 2015 and Gromit Unleashed 2 in 2018. Like previous trails, Unicornfest will finish with an auction of all sculptures to raise money for charity, with this trail’s charity being Leukaemia Care.

== Vandalism ==
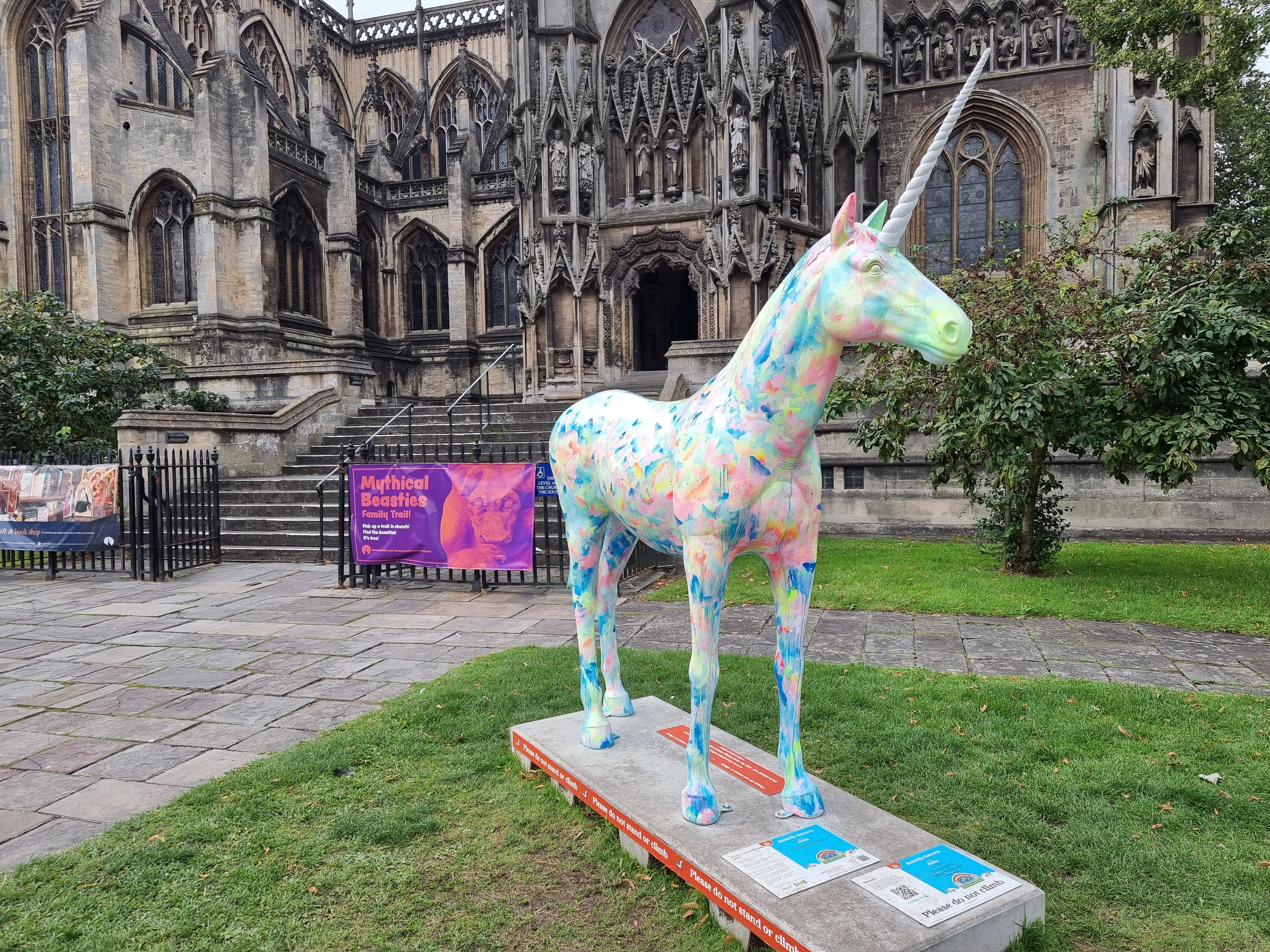
Butterfly Concerto by Cheba, which was vandalised before the trail even opened in front of St Mary Redcliffe Church

Being on public display, the unicorns have suffered damage from time to time.

- Butterfly Concerto designed by renowned street artist Cheba, which is on display in front of St Mary Redcliffe Church, had its horn broken off before the trail had even opened.
- The Golden Unicorn which is near the Merchant Navy Memorial and painted by Bo Lanyon had its horn completely removed during the first weekend.
- Nova painted by Talora Walsh had half its horn broken off.
