= Gator Trails =

Art project

Gator Trails is the name of an art project and series of alligator statues located in Alachua County, Florida, primarily in its county seat of Gainesville. The series was found around the county during the 2000s.

The concept was inspired by the Cows on Parade series in Chicago, which itself was inspired by a similar Zürich-based idea. Gators, having a cultural significance in Gainesville—through its presence as the University of Florida's mascot—and Florida in general, were chosen for the series. The statues were open for sponsorship, with sponsors' names displayed with the gators. They were also auctioned off as fundraisers for the arts in Gainesville.

In January 2001, the series was launched with 50 fiberglass alligator statues which were decorated by local artists. In August and September of that year, the Gainesville City Commission and Alachua County Commission, respectively, granted $20,000 each to the project. Some statues in the series were vandalized. Repairs were made to these statues and the county would prosecute anyone caught vandalizing the statues.

In total, 57 gator statues were unveiled publicly, with an additional three shown at private ceremonies. In July 2002, the last of the public statues were unveiled by the project's coordinator, Jennifer Beamen. The final statues were nicknamed Navigator, Ally the Snowbird Gator, Gator Del Sol, G3000 and Sir Lids-A lot. The statues were scheduled to be taken down in April 2003.
