= Visit Nepal 2020 =

Tourism advertising campaign

Visit Nepal 2020, also known by the initialism VNY 2020, was a tourism advertising campaign released by the Government of Nepal as an extension of Visit Nepal campaigns of 1998 and 2011. The campaign was coordinated by Suraj Vaidya. The folkloric creature Yeti was chosen as the campaign's official mascot. In March 2020, the campaign was cancelled due to the COVID-19 pandemic in Nepal.

== Campaign ==
Visit Nepal 2020 was the third tourism promotion campaign undertaken by the Government of Nepal, following the first in 1998 and second in 2011. The government aims to attract 1.5–2 million tourists in 2020. The 2020 campaign was coordinated by Suraj Vaidya alongside members of the Program Implementation Sub Committee. Vaidya wrote: "The success of VNY 2020 will depend on our national pride, willingness and ability to contribute".

== Promotion ==
To promote the campaign, the team built more than 108 sculptures around Nepal. The official mascot was chosen to be the Yeti, the ape-like creature from Himalayan folklore, and it was created by US-based Nepali artist Ang Tsherin Sherpa. 108 Yeti sculptures were planned to be displayed around Nepal by the end of 2020. Each sculpture measures 7 ft (2.1 m) in height; they were painted by 108 artists, and cost 500,000 Nepalese rupees (approximately US$4,414; £3,380) per piece. Kamal Pariyar of BBC News wrote about the Yeti's design: "Most people seem to agree this probably isn't what they imagine a yeti looks like". The mascot was met with some negative feedback based on the cost of the statues, and "use of religious and cultural motifs".

== Cancellation ==
On 22 March 2020, the government announced the cancellation of the campaign due to the COVID-19 pandemic in Nepal.

== See also ==
- CowParade, a similar public art program
- Moose in the City, a similar public art program in Toronto, Canada
