= Superdragon =

Superdragon may refer to:

- SuperDragons, a public art project in Newport, Wales
- Cray CS6400 computer, codenamed "SuperDragon"
- Bruce Lee: A Dragon Story, a biopic also known as Superdragon
- Secret Agent Super Dragon, a 1966 Eurospy film
- Super Dragon, American professional wrestler
- Super-Dragon, a variant of the M47 Dragon anti-tank missile
- Elizalde Super-Dragon, an aircraft engine
