= Moose in the City =

Series of sculptures in Toronto, Canada

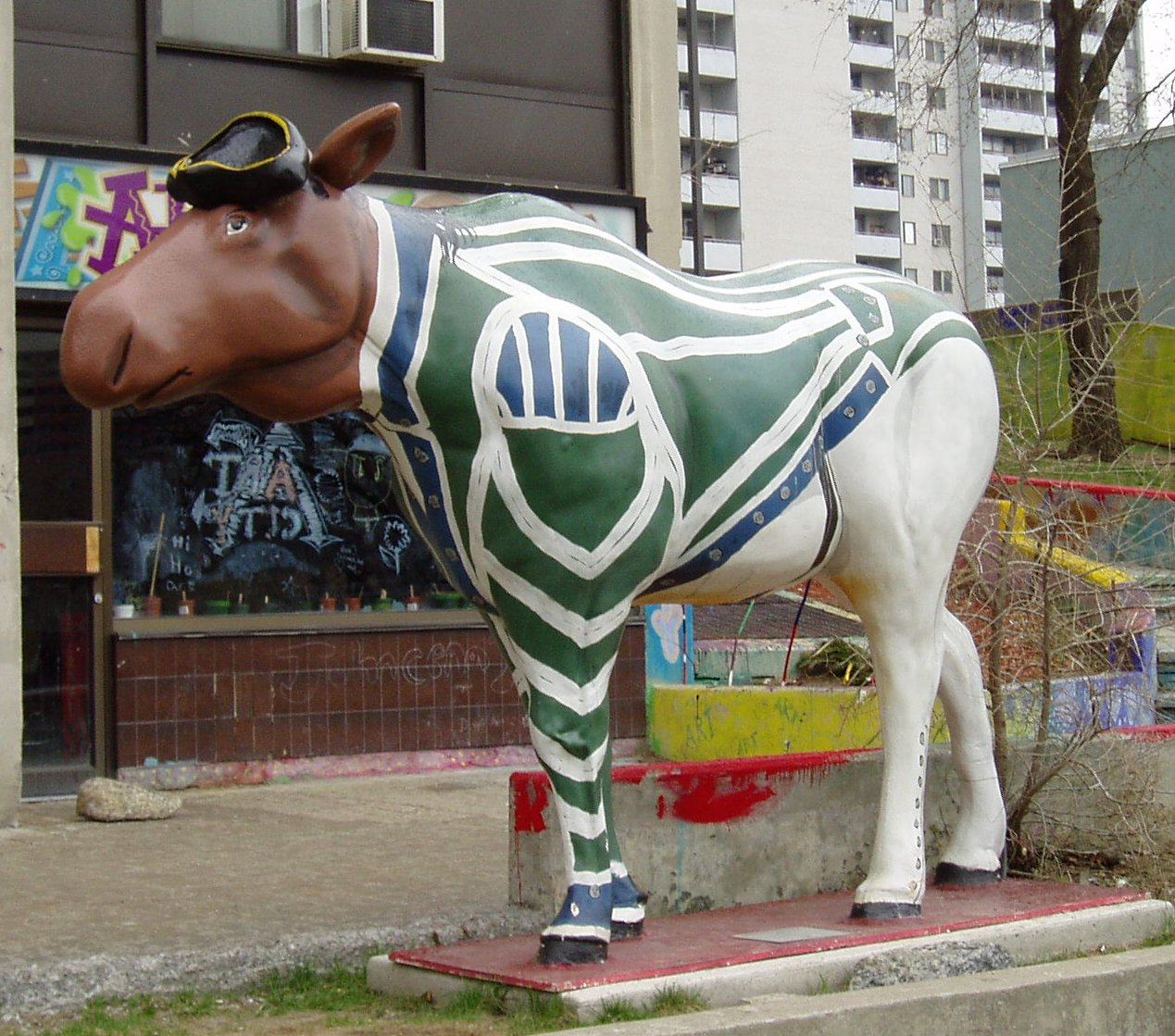
One of the remaining moose, Loyalist Moose at Simcoe Place

Moose in the City was a public art display in the year 2000 in Toronto, Ontario, Canada organized by the municipal government, which throughout the city placed 326 life-sized moose sculptures that had been decorated by local artists.

== Conception ==
McDonald's Canada founder and senior chairman George Cohon conceived of moose statues being placed across Toronto in June 1999, after seeing Chicago's Cows on Parade. After suggesting the idea to Toronto Mayor Mel Lastman, he was named chairman of the campaign. Anti-globalization activist Naomi Klein was quick to criticize Cohon's involvement: "Mr. Cohon is an expert in transforming cityscapes with iconic plastic monuments."

There was no cost to the city to run the campaign.

Corporations paid $6,000 for the statues, with a standard $1,000 fee going to the artists. A July article stated the fee was $6,500. The fee included materials; one artist exceeded their payment by $140. Artists were given coupons for Benjamin Moore paint.

During the project, he was given "hundreds of little moose things from everybody and anybody." They were at least considered, if not collected by the city, as were a large collection of personal papers.

Fibreglass Fabricators Moose Productions Inc. created the plastic and foam moose. Business owner Mark Selkirk would run for Etobicoke—Lakeshore riding in the 2003 municipal election. Moose keychains, when squeezed, would say "I love Toronto" in Mel Lastman's voice.

Woodbridge clothing company Legacy Sportswear had a contract to provide Moose in the City memorabilia.

The Toronto bid for the 2008 Olympic Games included a stop at the CN Tower, complete with moose.

CBC commentator Rex Murphy labelled Lastman the "Moose "R" Us Mayor". On announcing in 2003 that he would not seek another term as mayor, columnists about Lastman fixated on his "moose crusade", and stated that he was the "go-to guy on the moose file."

== Display ==
=== Vandalism and theft ===
Antlers were separate but attached to the moose sculptures. As a result, many were stolen throughout the exhibit, each weighing 2.5 kilograms. As of 22 June, 43.5 of 115 missing antlers were "unaccounted for", and three entire moose were missing. Once vandalism of the moose started, the city started a hotline for moose abuse tips, with messages checked every night.

Steven Dengler, who worked in a Bay Street office, and 12 other lawyers and "techies" launched AntlerWatch.com, a site using digital cameras to record the state of the moose, and act as a centralized, email-based crime reporting service, much like Crime Stoppers. At the time, 14 moose were in the downtown, with 85 more just revealed. Half of the moose being watched by the site were vandalized or spray-painted by the start of June. The group aimed to have realtime monitoring of moose on webcam, and to form a cooperative agreement with the city on moose protection. Daljit Sing Birak of Brampton was arrested by Toronto police in June, when caught with four antlers, after a 911 call to report the crime in progress. The man was charged with mischief under $5,000; if convicted, he faced a maximum penalty of five years in jail.

One letter to the editor suggested that, without antlers, the moose looked like donkeys. Another letter writer suggested it was either a "frustrated naturalist" correcting the bull moose, who have no antlers during the summer, developing them partway through August, or perhaps feminists, angry there were no cows. Endorsing the moose mutilation, globalization critic Naomi Klein dubbed Antler Watch "a group of corporate vigilantes. She suggested that "Mel was bang on about one thing. The moose have become a blank slate onto which this city projects its creativity. Only it turns out that most of that creativity involves some form of moose mutilation."

One guest columnist claimed "squads of municipal employees apparently work throughout the day to ensure that they are clean and unharmed by vandals." One letter writer described the repair process of moose. Tuesday nights, new antlers would be installed, and painted by Wednesday night. They would be gone by the next Monday. Notices were posted around the moose, asking for information, and video camera pointed towards the moose from nearby buildings. By 29 May, the moose was entirely removed from the spot.

In an August interview, Cohon commented "I don't like to talk about all the vandalism. I never expected people would damage them. It's unfortunate, but it's sort of a thing of the past. It seems to be over now."

=== Outside of Toronto ===
Lost Moose, one of the statues sponsored by BMW, was moved to Whitby to avoid the vandalism in Toronto, stationed at the entrance of Iroquois Park. During the 2000 Summer Olympics in Sydney, Australia, Aline Chretien officially opened a bar on Cockle Bay Wharf, to try and shake "Canada's reputation as a slightly dull—if clean and safe—place." Featured was vodka-based "moose juice", and Lastman was expected to appear. A few moose from the Moose in the City program were displayed in Darling Harbour, just west of the downtown, at "Moose Lodge". One eventually made its way to Bermuda. One of the Moose, the Tourist moose, ended up at 1405 Denison Street outside an industrial building in Markham, Ontario.

== Related events ==
On 7 September, the United Way held a Running of the Moose event where the sculptures were raced up and down Bay Street, raising $39,600. Initial publicity had mentioned that they hoped to raise $50,000. The mayor credited his wife, Marilyn, with the idea of the event. "When she told me about it, I couldn't control myself! I said, 'Marilyn! This is the greatest idea ever! It's phenomenal!" Cohon and Lastman were dressed as matadors at the event, and the moose in the race were solid red, yellow, green, blue, or purple, not the actual ones on display.

In August, a moose calling event was held near Yonge and Bloor Streets, with judges including a two-time world champion, and contestants including George Smitherman. The Toronto Santa Claus Parade included a variety of new floats in 2000, including one based on Moose in the city. Cavalcade of Lights in Nathan Phillips Square included a special Holiday Moose on the Square, presented by Labatt Blue.

== Reception ==
A Toronto Star poll in July found 53.5% liked the moose. After a few months, the public received the moose with more openness. An Ipsos-Reid poll for the Globe and Mail and CFRB asked agreement to the statement "I like the 'moose in the city' campaign and think something similar should be repeated next year' drew 57% yes response, 39% no, and 4% "don't know".

=== Commercial influence ===
In response to suggestions the moose were no more than corporate billboards, Cohon noted no more than 10 have logos on them; Christopher Hume questioned the validity of that assertion. Supporting sponsors like Coca-Cola were allowed "enhanced corporate identity." Participants had to follow rules on the amount of corporate presence each moose could have, rules found too restrictive by the National Hockey League and NHLPA, which did not participate. Hume noted irony in the fact that, during the Art Gallery of Ontario launch of the moose in March, Lastman touted "what exposure ... five months of advertising for your business."

=== As an emblem of Lastman ===
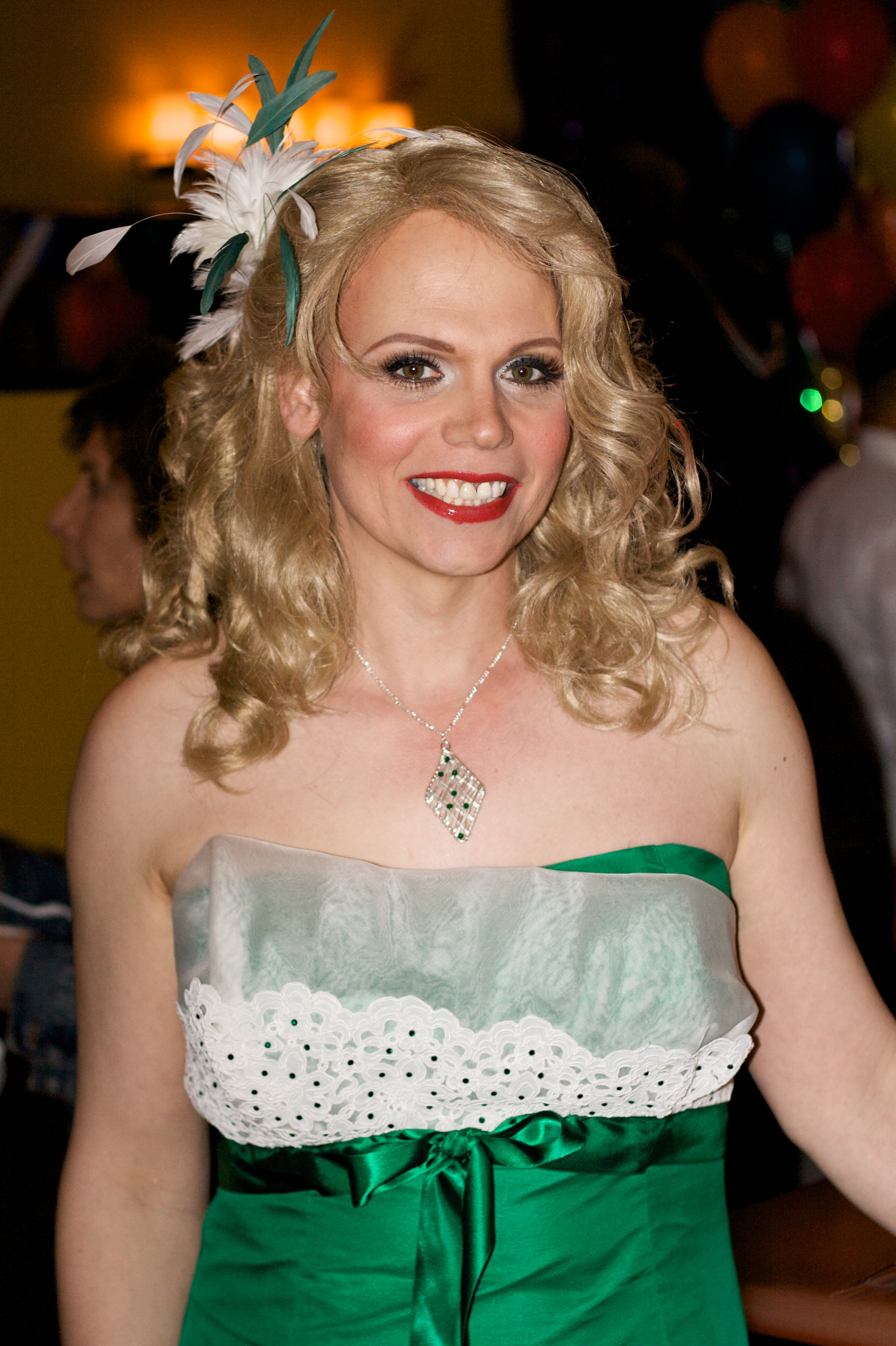
Enza Anderson

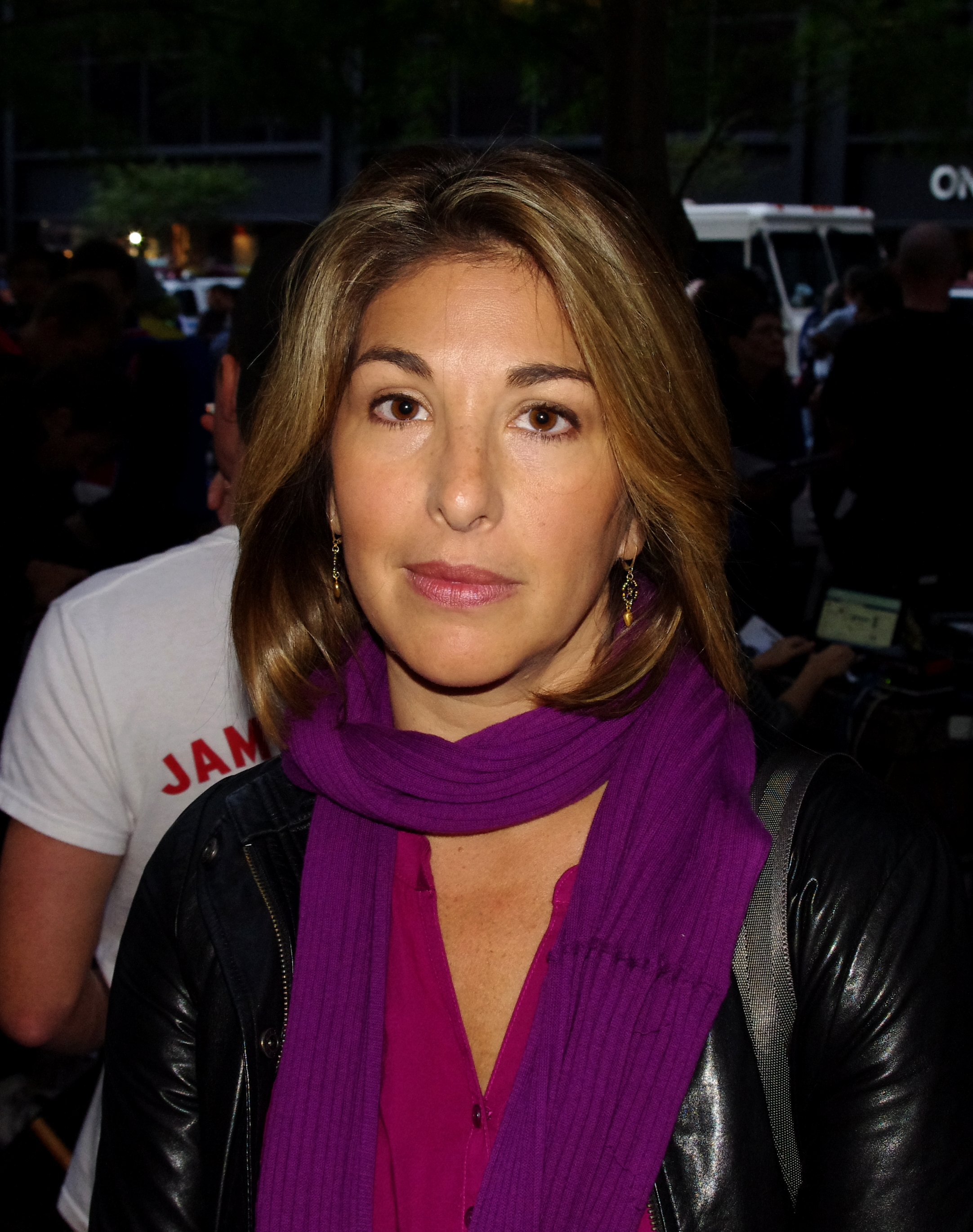
Naomi Klein

Various Torontonians criticized the moose.

On Lastman's announcement that he would run again in 2000, criticism returned. "Instead of going from photo op to photo op unveiling moose, he's going to have to take on the real concerns," stated John Nunziata, then an independent MP. When endorsing Tooker Gomberg for mayor, the Ontario Public Service Employees Union Region 5 highlighted what they felt was Lastman's choice of moose over the homeless.

"He never stops talking about the moose, as though they were the highlight of his first three years in office." Globe columnist John Barber saw Toronto's attitude towards the moose as a sign of their complacency, while a Star guest writer suggested that the city has become "a place that cares more about spectacle and cheap visual thrills than it does about its citizens." Lastman's priorities were scorned even by an underfunded candidate, Enza Anderson.

== Auction and legacy ==
By October, city officials were considering what they'd present the next year, with unicorns, air hockey tables, and UFOs on their list. In 2011, there was a similar snowman project, benefiting Starlight Children's Foundation Canada.

Expectations for the auction were to raise $25,000 on some moose.

== See also ==
- Visit Nepal 2020, an advertising campaign featuring similarly decorated Yeti
