= David Clarke (professor) =

British legal academic

David Clarke is deputy vice-chancellor and Professor of Law at Bristol University.

== Biography ==
Clark studied law at Queens' College Cambridge from 1968 to 1972, obtaining his BA degree in 1971 (MA 1974) and LLM in 1972. He became a Solicitor (Honours) of the Supreme Court in 1975, serving Articles of Clerkship with Andrew & Co, Solicitors of Lincoln and was an assistant solicitor to that firm until his appointment as lecturer in law at the University of Bristol in 1977.

Clark became a visiting lecturer in law at the University of Canterbury in New Zealand in 1985. Promoted reader in 1990, he was subsequently promoted to Professor of Law in the University of Bristol in 1995. He served as head of the Department of Law for three years from 1997 to 2000 and was dean of the Faculty of Law from 2001 to 2003 and dean of law in 2003–2004 on the merger of the Faculties of Social Sciences and Law. He was appointed a pro vice-chancellor in 2005, with responsibility for personnel and took up the newly established role of deputy vice-chancellor in 2008.

Clark has specialised in commercial property law and written extensively in the law of Landlord and Tenant and Commonhold. He was responsible for the Boundaries and Commonhold titles in Halsbury's Laws of England. Clark was a member of the Department of Constitutional Affairs Commonhold Consultation Group. He was also part a group advising the Law Commission on the reform of the law of easements and covenants. He is a co-editor of the Common Law World Review.

Since 1996, Clark has been a legal chairman for the Residential Property Tribunal Service (Rent Assessment Committees and Leasehold Valuation Tribunals) and was a consultant solicitor with Osborne Clarke from 1988 - 2009.

Clark was a school governor of Westbury Park Primary School in Bristol for four years and a Governor at Cotham School in Cotham for seven years, including a period as Chair of Governors.

== Curriculum Vitae ==
=== Education ===
- State Primary Schools and The Lincoln School, Lincoln 1961-1968
- Queens' College Cambridge, 1968–1972
- Bachelor of Arts, University of Cambridge, First Class, 1971. MA, 1975
- Master of Laws, University of Cambridge, First Class
- Admitted a Solicitor of the Supreme Court of Judicature 1975, with Honours

=== Employment history ===
==== Legal Practice ====
Articles of Clerkship, then Assistant Solicitor, with Messrs Andrew & Co, Solicitors, Lincoln 1973-1977

==== University of Bristol ====
- Lecturer in Law, 1977–1990
- Senior Lecturer in Law, 1990–1994
- Reader in Law, 1995–1996
- Professor of Law, 1995-continues
- Pro Vice-Chancellor, 2005–2008
- Deputy Vice-Chancellor, 2008-

=== Appointments ===
==== Visiting appointments ====
- 1985, Lecturer in Law, University of Canterbury, Christchurch, New Zealand
- Visiting Lecturer, SPACE, University of Hong Kong, 1986, and annually from 1995 to 2004, for 2 weeks a year
- 1988–2009. Commercial property law consultant, Osborne Clarke, Solicitors, Bristol
- 1997-continues. Legal Chairman Rent Assessment Committees and Leasehold Valuation Tribunals (Part-time)
- 2000–2006, member of the Department of Constitutional Affairs Commonhold Consultation Groups, assessing and then monitoring the implementation of the new law of Commonhold
- 2002–2010. One of two academic members of the advisory committee to the Law Commission on the reform of easements.

==== University appointments and contributions ====
- Legal adviser - University of Bristol Union, 1980–1983
- Tutor for Postgraduate Admissions, Faculty of Law 1988-1989
- Non-professorial member of Senate1988-1993
- Tutor for Undergraduate Admissions, Faculty of Law 1990-1993
- Convenor of the Non Professorial Assembly, 1990–91
- Chair, Overseas Committee, 1991–1992
- Non-professorial representative of Senate on Council 1990-1993
- Member of Senate 1995-continues
- Head of Department of Law, 1997–2000
- Dean of the Faculty of Law, 2001–2003
- Chair, Travel to Work Group (TWIG) 2001-2004
- Dean of Law, 2003–2004
- Member of Council 1995-continues

=== Research ===
He has published extensively in the field of Property Law generally, and Commercial Property, Landlord and Tenant and Commonhold in particular

=== External examining ===
Periods as external examiner for: the University of Cambridge; University of Durham; University of Hull; University of Sheffield; University of Keele; University College London; Queen's University, Belfast; Newcastle University and the University of Law.

=== Community activities ===
- Governor of Westbury Park Primary School, 1992–1996
- Governor of Cotham Grammar School, 1992–2000, Vice Chair of Governors, 1994–1996, Chair of Governors, 1996–1997. Trustee of Redland Chapel Charitable Trust.
- Clarke purchased Bark at 'Ee, part of the Gromit Unleashed sculpture collection, for £20,000. The oversized stuffed dog is displayed at the Willis Memorial Building on the Bristol University campus.

== Sources ==
- Deputy Vice-Chancellor, Professor David Clarke
