= Burges Salmon =

UK law firm

Burges Salmon LLP
- Headquarters: Bristol, United Kingdom
- No. of offices: Bristol, London and Edinburgh
- No. of lawyers: 340+
- No. of employees: 900+
- Major practice areas: Banking and Finance, Commercial, Corporate, Dispute Resolution, Employment and Pensions, Real Estate
- Revenue: £108.7 million (2021)
- Date founded: 1841 (Bristol)
- Company type: LLP
- Website: www.burges-salmon.com

Burges Salmon LLP is a law firm based in Bristol, England.

== About Burges Salmon ==
Burges Salmon is a UK law firm with a national and international client base.

The firm operates throughout the UK and in European and international jurisdictions. The firm currently has sector expertise in a range of areas including energy, transport, food and farming, real estate, financial services and infrastructure. The firm was a founder member of the Legal Sector Alliance.

In 2012, Burges Salmon chose the Bristol Children's Hospital charity, Wallace & Gromit's Grand Appeal, as its charity of the year - raising £84,000 to help support the expansion of the hospital.

In 2013, the firm became a founding sponsor of Aardman and The Grand Appeal's Gromit Unleashed public art exhibition – sponsoring Aardman's Gromit sculpture at London Paddington station.

The firm publishes an annual review called Insight.

== History ==
The origins of the firm go back to 1841 when Edward Burges set up as a sole practitioner. His father and grandfather had both been lawyers before him.

Following the death of the founder in 1890, the practice was continued by his son W. E. Parry Burges who formed a partnership with a Mr Sloan, resulting in the name becoming Burges & Sloan. In 1947 the partnership was joined by Stuart Evans, who was then practising alone as Salmon, Cumberland and Evans. The firm's move to Narrow Quay House in 1982 saw the shortening of the name to "Burges Salmon".

In 2010, Burges Salmon re-located from Narrow Quay to its current head office at One Glass Wharf in the Bristol Temple Quarter Enterprise Zone. In 2012, the firm also moved its London offices from Chancery Exchange to New Street Square, enabling it to operate from both Bristol and London.

In 2008, allegations were made against Burges Salmon that sub-prime loans may have been mis-sold to farmers, and was investigated by the Solicitors Regulation Authority. In October 2010 the Solicitors Regulation Authority announced that it had closed the investigation with no further action.
