= Gromit Unleashed 2 =

Public arts trail

- The logo for the trail, featuring the subjects of the sculptures: Wallace, Gromit, and Feathers McGraw.
- Artist: Various designers
- Year: 2018
- Medium: Decorated statues
- Subject: Gromit Wallace Feathers McGraw
- Location: Bristol and surrounding areas
- Owner: Wallace & Gromit’s Grand Appeal and Aardman Animations
- Preceded by: Gromit Unleashed (2013); Shaun in the City (2015)
- Followed by: Wallace And Gromit: The Grand Adventure
- Website: www.gromitunleashed.org.uk

Gromit Unleashed 2 was a public arts trail in Bristol, England. The trail featured 67 giant sculptures designed by high-profile artists, designers, innovators and local talent. Sculptures were positioned in high footfall and iconic locations around Bristol and the surrounding area from 2 July to 2 September 2018. A sequel to Gromit Unleashed in 2013, the trail featured statues of Wallace on a life-size bench, Gromit, and Feathers McGraw. On the 23rd of August 2023, a fourth trail was announced, to run in 2025.

The trail raised funds for the Bristol Royal Hospital for Children and St. Michael's Hospital's Special Care Baby unit.

== Background ==
=== Gromit ===
Gromit is a dog belonging to an eccentric inventor, Wallace, in a series of claymation films produced by Aardman Animations, based in Spike Island, Bristol. Three of the films in the Wallace and Gromit film series have won Academy Awards: The Wrong Trousers, A Close Shave and Wallace & Gromit: The Curse of the Were-Rabbit.

=== Wallace and Gromit's Grand Appeal ===
The aim of Gromit Unleashed was to fundraise for Wallace and Gromit's Grand Appeal. Founded in 1995, the charity raises funds for paediatric medical equipment at the Bristol Royal Hospital for Children and St. Michael's Hospital. In collaboration with Aardman, it uses the characters Wallace and Gromit as mascots for the charity.

=== Previous trails ===
Gromit Unleashed 2 is a sequel to Gromit Unleashed that ran between 1 July and 8 September 2013 in Bristol, featuring 80 Gromit sculptures and raising £2.3 million for the Grand Appeal. The Shaun in the City trail featuring 120 sculptures of Shaun the Sheep were distributed between Bristol and London in 2015 and raised £1,087,900 for the charity. Following their respective successes in raising funds for the Grand Appeal, Gromit Unleashed 2 was announced in 2017.

== List of sculptures ==
=== Gromit ===
Name	Original Trail Location	Designer	Sponsor	Sale price
A Grand Gromplication	Bristol Museum	Faculty of Engineering, University of Bristol	University of Bristol	-
Alex the Lion	M Shed	DreamWorks	Creditcall	£18,000
Amazing Grace	Chipping Sodbury High Street	Tim Sutcliffe	Chipping Sodbury Chamber of Commerce	£17,000
Bristol in Bloom	St Mary Redcliffe	Ella Masters	Immediate Media Co.	£13,500
Bristol's Own	Queen Square	Susan Webber	Barcan+Kirby	£22,000
Boss	Showcase Cinema De Lux, Cabot Circus	Wes Anderson	Showcase Cinema De Lux	£16,000
Caractacus Paws	The Galleries	Chitty Chitty Bang Bang team at Eon Productions	The Galleries	£20,000
Champion	Badminton Road, Downend	Mike Ogden	Downend and Bromley Heath Parish Council	£16,000
Cracking Build Gromit!	Cabot Circus	Lego	Cabot Circus	£22,000
Cubby	Avon Valley Adventure and Wildlife Park	Peskimo	Avon Valley Adventure and Wildlife Park	£11,000
Cupid	Woodlands Lane, Bradley Stoke	Blossom & Brush	Dunkley's Chartered Accountants	£15,000
Deerest Gromit	Bower Ashton campus, University of the West of England	Hend Esmat and Lamiaa Diab	UWE Bristol	£15,000
Dias de los Perros	Arnos Vale Cemetery	Gavin Strange	Briz-Graphics	£14,000
Draco	Kings Chase shopping centre, Kingswood	The Knitted Pea	Evan's and Partners	£13,000
Ferne	The Horsefair	Natalie Guy	First Bus	£26,000
Giggles	Grand Pier, Weston-super-Mare	Emily Golden	Grand Pier	£19,000
Gromit	Temple Quay	Nick Park	Canada Life Group Insurance	£42,000
Gromit P. Sullivan (Sulley)	Gromit Unleashed shop, The Mall at Cribbs Causeway	Peter Docter (Pixar Studios)	LDC	£22,000
Gromitronic	M Shed	Renishaw	Renishaw	-
Gromjet	Aerospace Bristol	Rolls-Royce	Rolls-Royce	£25,000
Honeydew	Arnolfini	Tim Sutcliffe	The Yogscast	£11,000
Honeysuckle Rose	St Mary Centre, Thornbury	Sarah-Jane Grace	Thornbury Chamber of Commerce	£16,000
Marshall	Chew Valley Lake	PAW Patrol	Bristol Water	£16,500
Merry-go-Gromit	Puxton Park	Emily Golden	Puxton Park	£12,000
Oceans 1: Deep Blue	We The Curious	Faculty of Engineering, University of Bristol	Airbus	-
Oceans 2: Yellow Sub	M Shed	Faculty of Engineering, University of Bristol	Airbus	-
Peek a Boo!	Blaise Castle Estate	Mandy Sutcliffe	Yankee Candle	£13,000
Pickles McPrickles	Greenway Centre, Southmead	Simon Tozer	YTL Developments	£15,000
Rockin' Robin	Ashton Gate Stadium	Hannah Bone	Ashton Gate Stadium	£16,000
Splash!	St Mark's Road, Easton	Cheba	Destination Bristol	£19,000
Sprinkles	Boston Tea Party, Gloucester Road	Tom Hovey	Arthur David Food with Service Ltd.	£12,500
Stellar	Park Street	Laura Hallett	Cass Art	£30,000
Swallows and Amazons	Willow Brook Centre, Bradley Stoke	StudioCanal	Willow Brook Centre	£18,000
The Bristol Hound	Clifton Suspension Bridge viewpoint, Sion Hill	Zoe Power	Grant Thornton LLP	£17,000
The Brystal Maze	Near South Bristol Community Hospital	Richard Ayoade and The Crystal Maze producers	The Bottle Yard Studios	£15,500
The Hound of Music	Gardiner Haskins, Bristol	Sarah Matthews	Gardiner Haskins	£15,500
The Howl	Royal West of England Academy	Tim Sutcliffe	Redrock Consulting Ltd.	£20,000
ThermoGromit	Royal Fort Gardens	Kacper Sopol and Timmy Wilmott	University of Bristol	£16,000
Toto	Flaxpits Lane, Winterbourne	Jenny Urquhart	AJ Homes	£18,000
Tropi-canis	House of Fraser, Cabot Circus	Maria Burns	House of Fraser	Raffled (Note: The ‘Tropi-canis’ statue was sold via a raffle, rather than through auction. Tickets costed £2.50 each, and were available to residents of Great Britain aged 16 and over. The winner was Chris from Clevedon, who was selected using a random number generator.)
Wild at Heart	Ashton Court	Liza Donoghue	ETEX Building Performance Ltd.	£14,000

=== Wallace ===
Name	Original Trail Location	Designer	Sponsor	Sale price
A Grand Tribute	Millennium Square	Nick Park	We The Curious	£55,000
George	The Downs	Helen Javes	SLX	£20,000
Gnome Sweet Gnome	College Green	Katie Wallis	Natracare	£20,000
Long John Wallace	Cascade Steps, The Centre	Elaine Carr	VWV	£20,000
Rocket Man	Bristol Royal Hospital for Children	Elaine Carr	CAMB Machine Knives International Ltd.	£32,000
Space Oddi-tea	Wapping Wharf, Spike Island	Carys Ink	Wapping Wharf	£24,000
Spock	The Mall at Cribbs Causeway	Star Trek	The Mall at Cribbs Causeway	£17,000
The Wallace Collection	Anchor Road, Bristol	Rachel Bennett	Hargreaves Lansdown	£17,000
The Wensleydale Kid	Clifton Observatory	Paula Bowles	Clifton Observatory	£22,000
Wallace	Bristol Cenotaph	Nick Park	Bristol City Centre BID	£31,000
Wallace in Wonderland	Mall Gardens, Clifton	Beth Waters	BID Clifton Village	£40,000
Wallambard	Near SS Great Britain	Tim Miness	Womble Bond Dickinson	£55,000

=== Feathers McGraw ===
Name	Original Trail Location	Designer	Sponsor	Sale price
Banana-arm-a	North Street, Bedminster	Katie Wallis	Jeremy Gumbley	£13,000
Fangs McGraw	Stanfords, Corn Street	Ruth Broadway	Stanfords	£15,000
Feathers McGraw	Outside Wills Memorial Building	Nick Park	EY	£30,000
Feathers Macaw	Outside Victoria Rooms	Amy Timms	Ashfords	£16,000
Feathertron 3000	Bristol Energy Hub	Jam Factory & Jimmy 2 Eggs	Bristol Energy	£15,000
Fromage McGraw	Quakers Friars	Peter Lord	Bluefin Professions	£15,000
Game of Cones	Bristol Temple Meads railway station	Rachel Bennett	Burges Salmon	£17,000
In-cog-nito	The Mall at Cribbs Causeway	Amalgam	Amalgam	£17,000
Light as a Feather	Clifton Suspension Bridge	Josh & Aimee Williams	Osborne Clarke	£20,500
Oh Bollards!	Aardman Animations studios	Merlin Crossingham	Aardman Animations	£22,000
One in a Minion	Bristol Marriott Hotel City Centre	Illumination	Bristol Marriott Hotel City Centre	£19,000
Plooming Marvellous	Hartcliffe Community Farm Park	Amy Timms	Bristol Post	£19,000
Prima Featherina	Bristol Marriott Royal Hotel	Ruth Broadway	Bristol Marriott Royal Hotel	£14,000
The Emperor	The Podium, Broadmead	Natalie Guy	John James Bristol Foundation	£38,000

== Footnotes ==
'Trailblazer' interactive sculptures
