= St Augustine the Less Church, Bristol =

Demolished church in Bristol, England

St Augustine the Less Church
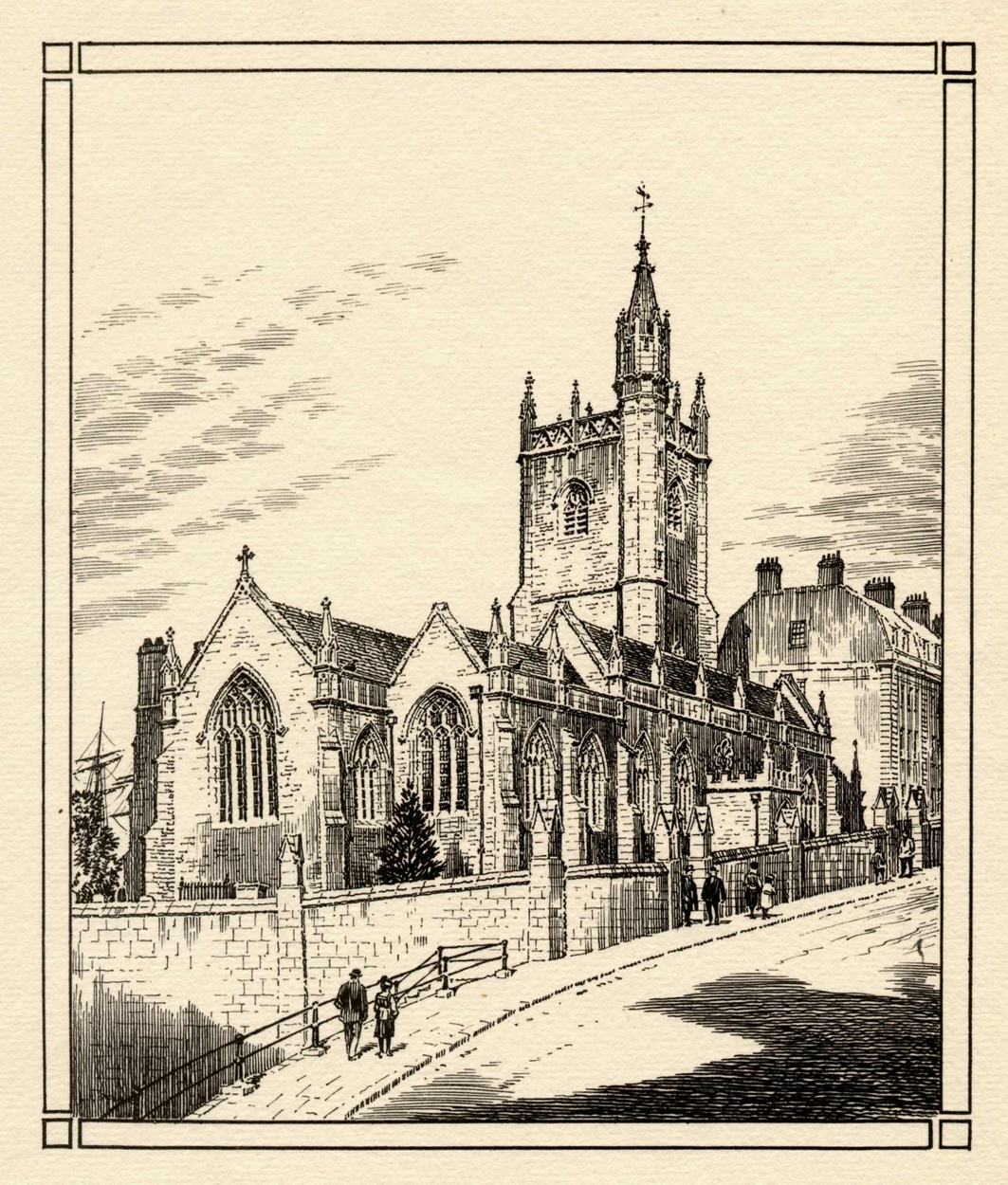
- Plate etching, showing on the left a ship's masts in Bristol Harbour and on the right, housing leading towards College Green and Bristol Cathedral

- Location within Bristol

General information
- Location: Bristol, England
- Coordinates: 51.452105°N 2.598940°W
- Construction started: 13th century
- Demolished: 1962

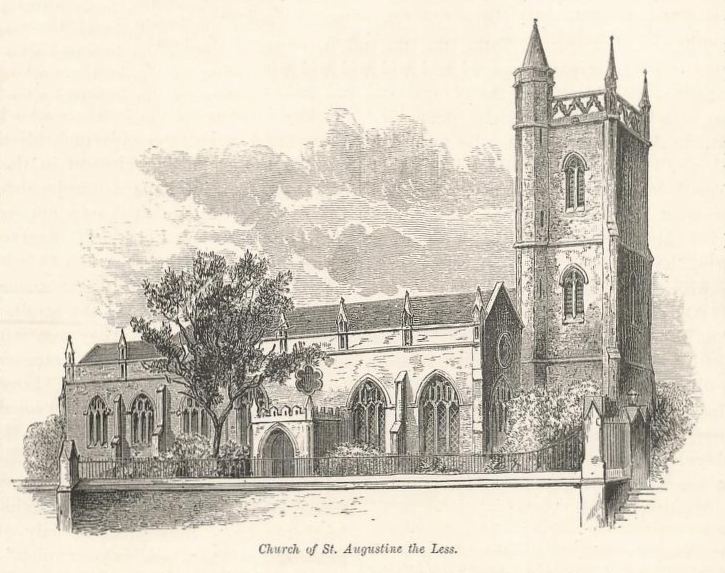
St Augustine the Less, 1881

St Augustine the Less was founded by the canons of St Augustine's Abbey (now Bristol Cathedral) to provide for people living within the precinct of the Abbey but were not themselves part of the abbey. The church was entirely rebuilt c.1480. Following the Dissolution of the abbey in 1539, the church became a Church of England parish church.

Following a decline in the population of the parish in the early twentieth century, the parish was united to that of St George's, Brandon Hill. St Augustine the Less was damaged by fire in the Bristol Blitz of 1940, closed in 1956 and demolished in 1962.

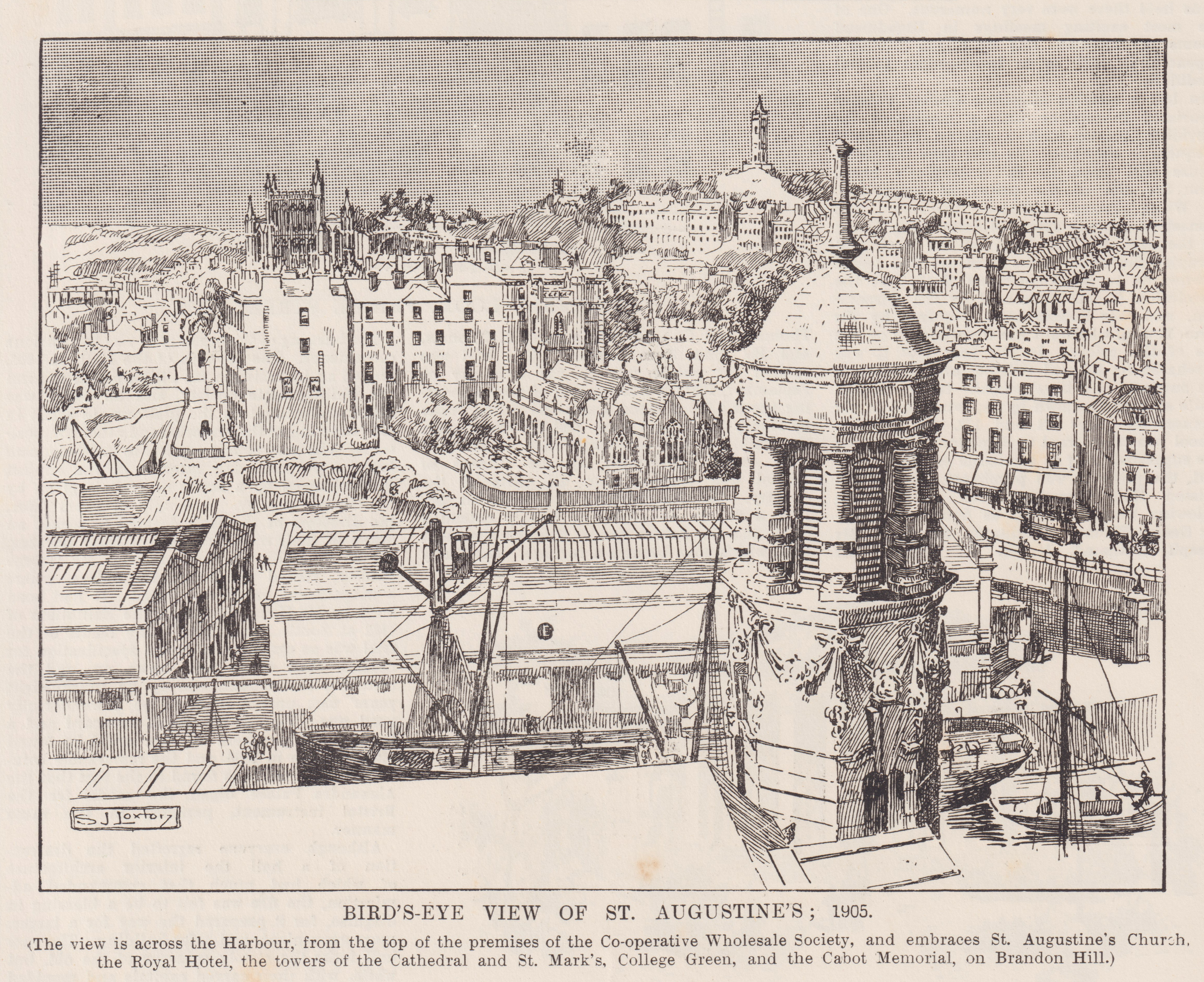
View of St Augustine's, 1905

After demolition the site remained vacant until the early 1980s, when an archaeological investigation was undertaken before an extension to the Royal Hotel was built over it. Archaeological excavations conducted on the church site in 1983-4 uncovered 11th century burials, indicating that there had been a religious site in the area prior to the construction of the Abbey in the 1140s. Over 100 burial vaults were discovered below the former church's floor, together with coins of various periods; the finds were deposited in the Bristol City Museum and Art Gallery.

== Archives ==
Parish records of St Augustine-the-Less church, Bristol are held at Bristol Archives (Ref. P.St Aug) (online catalogue) including baptism and marriage registers and one burial register. The archive also includes records of the incumbent from 1235 to 1938, churchwardens, overseers of the poor, charities, schools, societies and vestry plus deeds.

== See also ==
- Churches in Bristol
