= Wow! Gorillas =

Art installation in Bristol, England

Coordinates: 51°27′N 2°35′W

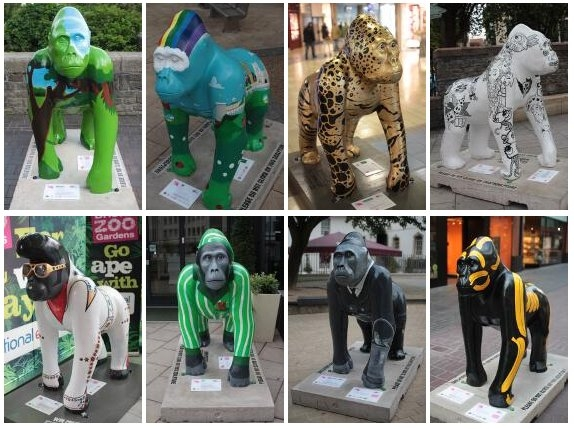

Wow! Gorillas was a project organised by Bristol Zoo in 2011 that displayed 61 decorated life-sized fibreglass gorilla sculptures on the streets of Bristol, England.

The project followed the concept of the “Land in Sicht” the original Swiss project by artistic director Walter Knapp, which has inspired the subsequent worldwide exhibition "CowParade" and similar exhibitions in other cities.

A final gorilla was put on display outside Dunkley's Chartered Accountants in Bradley Stoke. Painted by Eloise Dunkley.

== Significance ==
Gorillas have had an iconic significance for Bristol city since Alfred the gorilla arrived at the Bristol Zoo and was one of the first gorillas successfully kept in captivity. At his death in 1948, Alfred was the oldest gorilla in the world kept in captivity. Alfred became so important for the city and for its meaningfulness in the effort of saving primates, that after his death his body was stuffed by taxidermist Rowland Ward and kept on display at Bristol City Museum.

In March 1956 Alfred's body disappeared from the glass cabinet of the museum for several days before turning up in a doctor's office. The identity of the kidnappers remained unknown for over 50 years. When the mystery of the kidnappers was finally solved, the authorities declared that, although such illegal activities should never be condoned, no action would be taken. The disappearance was not malicious and was indeed regarded as one of the acts related to one of the most loved figures of Bristol city.

This historical and current love and dedication towards primates made the project especially attractive to locals and visitors and initiated a cascade of other initiatives such as schools learning programmes, incorporating art and environmental awareness.

== Aim of the project ==
The aim of the project was to raise awareness about the extinction crisis facing primates in the wild, and it is sponsored by the Bristol Zoo on the occasion of its 175th birthday and its long lasting effort to save primates in Cameroon, most notably at Ape Action Africa. The zoo has saved a number of gorillas and was then taking care of a group of six gorillas.

After the street exhibition (between 6 July and 7 September 2011) the sculptures were sold at auction in Bristol on 29 September, raising £427,300, and the proceeds donated to charity.

== See also ==
- Gromit Unleashed, and its successor Gromit Unleashed 2, similar art projects in the Bristol area
