= CowParade =

International public art exhibit

Bronze casting commemorating Chicago's 1999 exhibition

CowParade is an international public art exhibit that has featured in major world cities. Fiberglass sculptures of cows are decorated by local artists, and distributed over the city centre, in public places such as train stations, important avenues, and parks. They often feature artwork and designs specific to local culture, as well as city life and other relevant themes.

After the exhibition in the city, which may last many months, the statues are auctioned off and the proceeds donated to charity.

There are a few variations of shape, but the three most common shapes of cow were created by Pascal Knapp, a Swiss-born sculptor who was commissioned to create the cows specifically for the CowParade series of events. Pascal Knapp owns the copyrights to the standing, lying, and grazing cow shapes used in the CowParade events.

== History ==
The concept of "cow parade" has its origins in Zürich, Switzerland, in 1998 by artistic director Walter Knapp, it is based on an idea which was realised in the same city for the first time in 1986: lions as the symbol of Zurich were painted and then on display throughout the city.

The Zürich exhibit 1998 was not called "cow parade"—it was called Land in Sicht ("Land ho"). The concept was brought to the United States when Chicago businessman Peter Hanig, along with Commissioner of Cultural Affairs Lois Weisberg, organized an event in Chicago in 1999 called Cows on Parade. A Swiss company, CowHolding Parade AG, started to explore the idea. The American company capitalizing on this idea, CowHolding Parade, was founded in 1999; the Swiss company promptly sued but the case fizzled out without results. A bronze casting of one of the cows is on permanent display in Chicago in commemoration of the city's initial exhibition.

The success of this venture inspired many other cities to host similar fundraising projects. The idea has been taken up by other cities which have chosen animals for public art projects with painted fiberglass sculptures (e.g. Liverpool) (see Similar projects).

== Cows ==
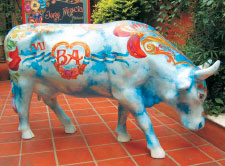
Vaca Fileteada from Buenos Aires's cow parade, 2006

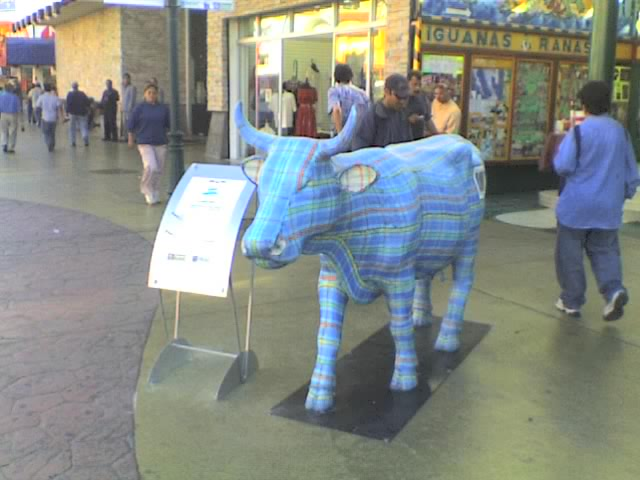
A cow at Revolucion Avenue, from Tijuana CowParade 2008

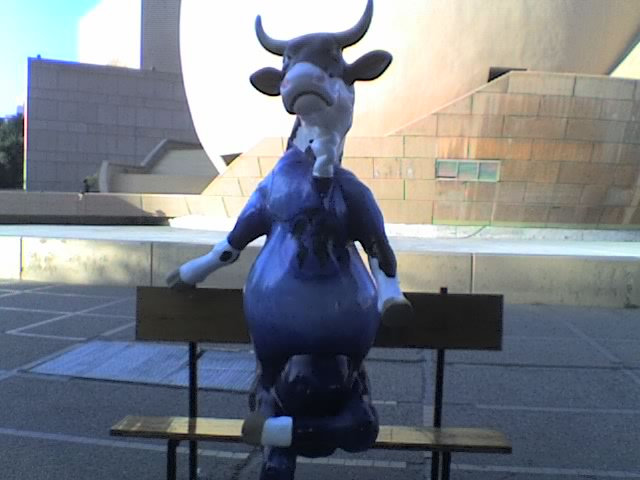
El chico de la banca (the guy on the bench) cow, at CECUT, from Tijuana CowParade 2008

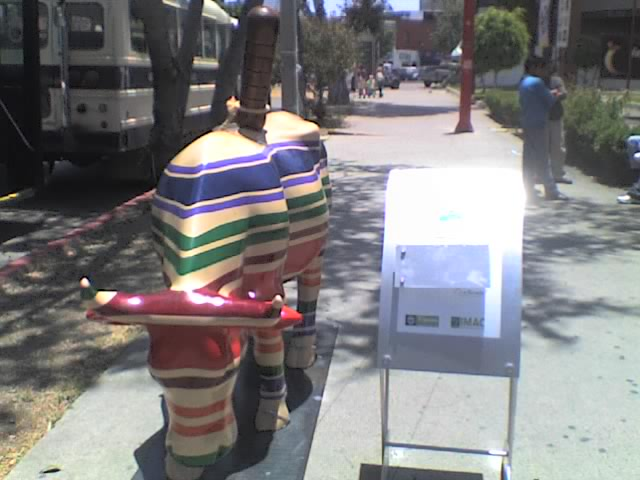
Vacalero cow, in Paseo de los Heroes, from Tijuana CowParade 2008

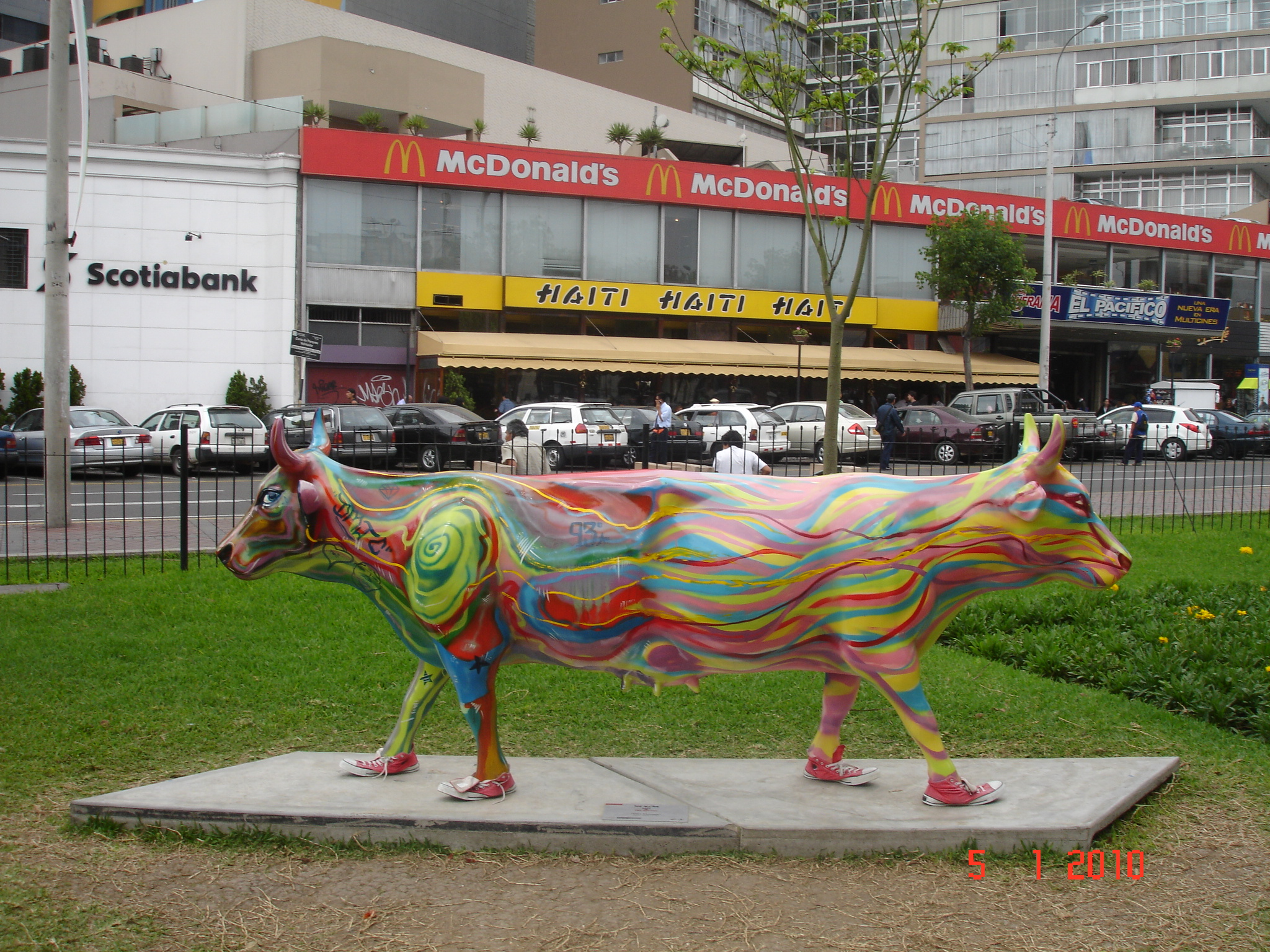
Double-cow in Lima (Peru), 2010

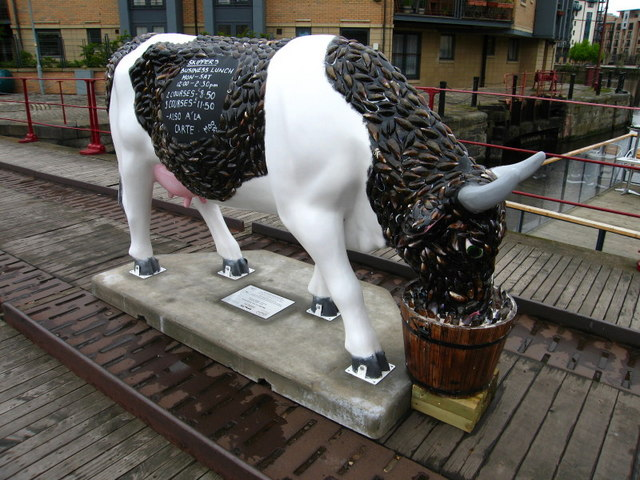
2006 Edinburgh Cow Parade, Moules on the Waterfront

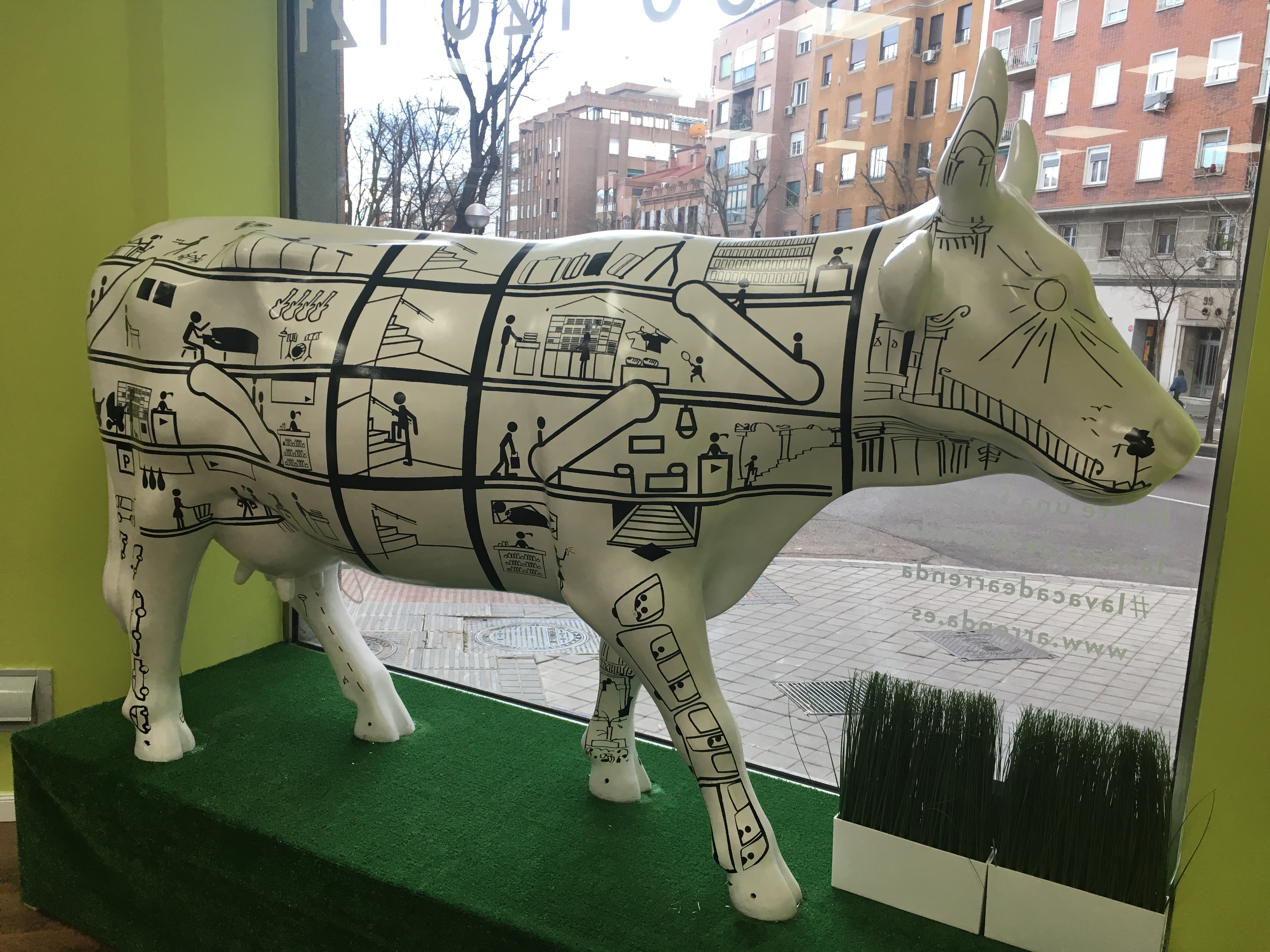
Cow from CowParade in Madrid, 2009

== Past locations ==
- Chicago, Illinois, US (1999)
- New York, New York, US (2000, 2021)
- Bilbao, Spain (2001)
- Ventspils, Latvia (2002)
- Buenos Aires, Argentina (2006)
- Houston, Texas, US (2001)
- Kansas City, Missouri, US (2001)
- Portland, Oregon, US (2002)
- Prague, Czech Republic (2004)
- Manchester, England, UK (2004)
- Athens, Greece (2006)
- Edinburgh, Scotland, UK (2006)
- Denver, Colorado, US (2006)
- Toulouse, France (2012)
- Santa Catarina, Brazil (2011) visiting Blumenau, Camboriú, Florianópolis, Joinville, Rio Negrinho
- Harrisburg, Pennsylvania, US (2004)
- Perth, Western Australia (2016)
- San Luis Obispo, California, US (2016)
- Mississauga, Ontario, Canada (2021)
- Toronto, Ontario, Canada (2022)
- San Antonio, Texas, US (2025)

== Similar projects ==
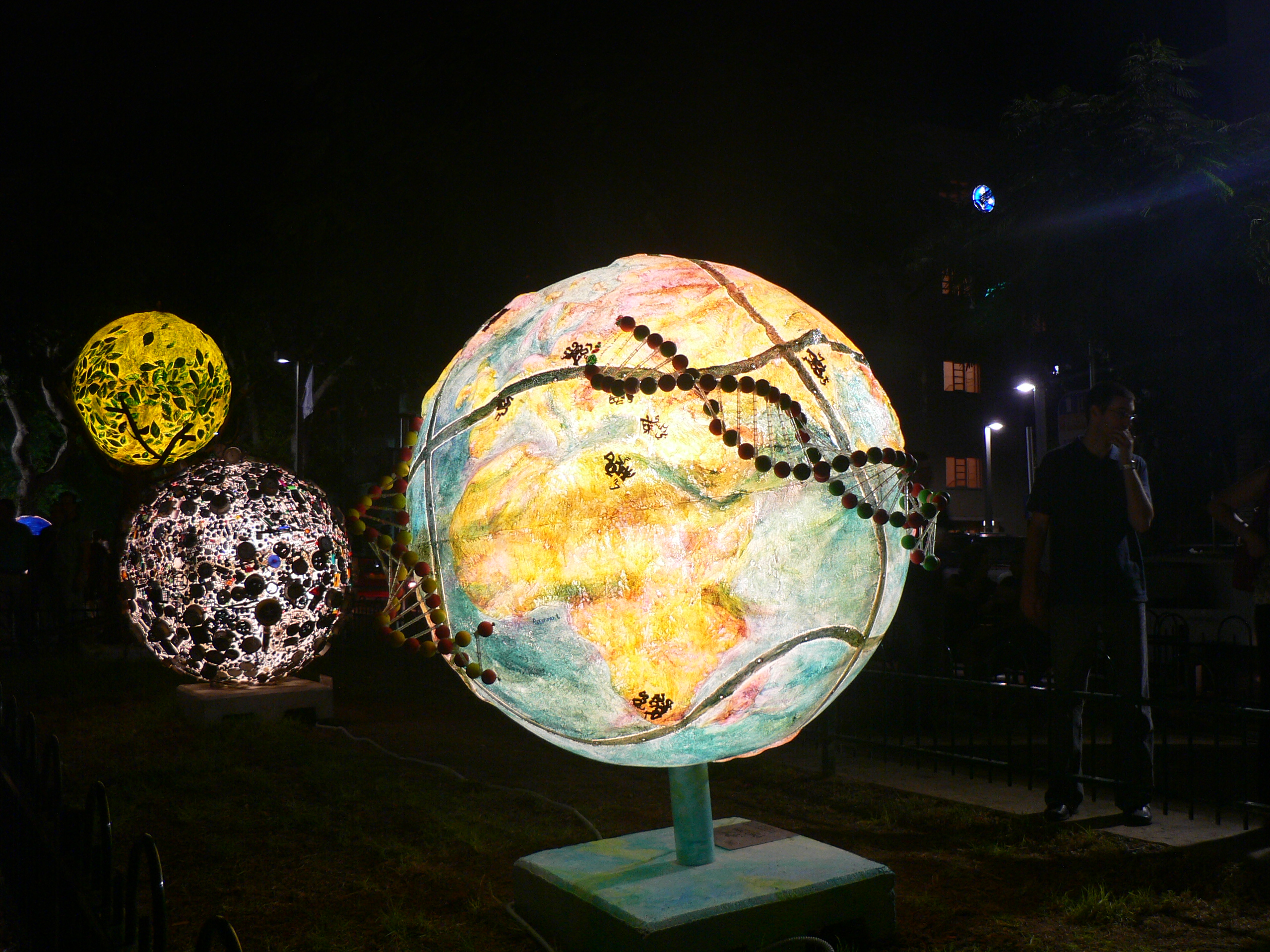
Globe in Tel Aviv, A Gateway to the World, 2007

The phenomenon of CowParade has spawned copy-cat statue decorating projects in a number of cities worldwide.

Zürich itself has adapted the bear theme in the "Teddy-Summer" in 2005.

=== Elephant Parades ===
Elephant Parade is dedicated to saving the Asian elephant from extinction with auctioned off proceeds going to the Elephant Family organisation.

Location	Name	Exhibits	Date
Copenhagen	Elephant Parade	102 baby elephants	2011 June
Hasselt	Elephant Parade		2012
Heerlen	Elephant Parade		2011
London	Elephant Parade		2010
Singapore	Elephant Parade		2011

=== Buddy Bears ===
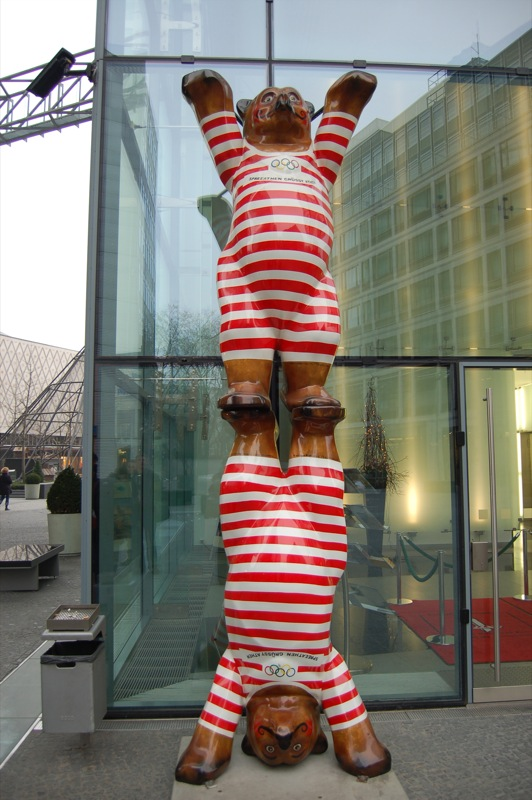
Two Buddy Bears at Kurfürstendamm 21, Berlin

This adopts the Cowparade idea to Berlin's town mascot; however the entailing United Buddy Bears exhibitions are very different from all other urban events. The bears were created by the German artists Klaus and Eva Herlitz. The idea and the philosophy behind the United Buddy Bears exhibitions are unique: with its international approach and its symbolism, this synthesis of the arts globally promotes tolerance, international understanding and a peaceful coexistence.

Location	Name	Number of Buddy Bears	Date
Berlin	Buddy Bear Berlin Show	350	2001 and 2002
Berlin + since 2004 worldwide	United Buddy Bears Worldtour	150	2002 and 2003, since 2004 worldwide

=== Wild in Art ===
Since 2008 Wild in Art has created sculpture trails since 2008 from Aberdeen to Cape Town including events associated with sporting events (2012 Olympics and 2014 Commonwealth Games).

Location	Name	Exhibits	Date
Aberdeen, Dundee, Edinburgh, Glasgow and Inverness	Oor Wullie's Big Bucket Trail	60 Wullies	June 17, 2019, for 6 weeks
Aberdeen	Wild Dolphins	50 Dolphins	June 23, 2014
Ashford, Kent	Snowdogs Discover Ashford	55 Snowdogs	September 12 – November 18, 2018
Birmingham	Big Hoot	89 owls	July 20 to September 27, 2015
Birmingham	Big Sleuth	100 sun bears	July 10 to September 17, 2017
Bournemouth	Pride in Bournemouth	50 lions	2011
Bristol	Gromit Unleashed	80 Gromits	2013
Cambridge	Cows about Cambridge	90 Red Poll cows	June 28, 2021, to September 4, 2021
Chester	Rhino Mania	70 rhinos	2010
Liverpool	Go Penguins	142 penguins	2009
Liverpool	Go Superlambananas!	125 Superlambananas	2008
London		83 Wenlock and Mandeville mascots	2012
London	Year of the Bus Sculpture Trails	41 buses	2014
Manchester	Bee in the City	Over 100 bees	July 23 to September 23, 2018
Norwich	GoGoDragons!	84 large dragons, 120 school dragons	2015

=== Asia ===
- Bat Yam "Masks" (2006–2007)
- Jerusalem, "Lions of Jerusalem" (2002)
- Tel Aviv, "Shvarim VeShe'arim" (2005)
- Tel Aviv, "A Gateway to the World" (2007)
- Dubai, "Camel Caravan" (2003)
- Tokyo, "Totoro Comes to Town" (2021)

=== Europe ===
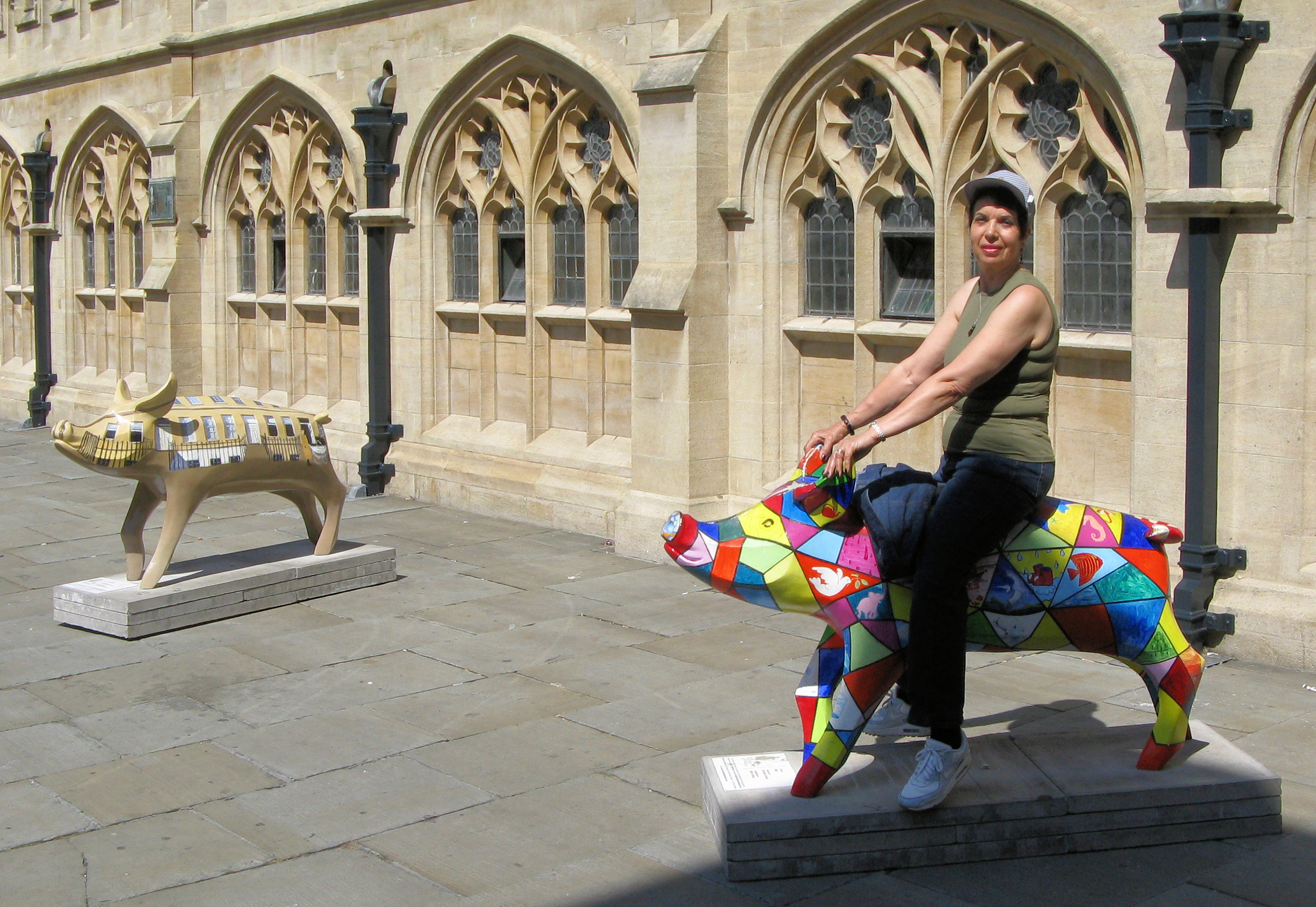
Two of the 104 decorated pigs on display in the English city of Bath. This was a public art event, called "King Bladud's Pigs in Bath". Pig sculptures were on display around the city through the summer of 2008.

Location	Name	Exhibits	Date
's-Hertogenbosch	Garden of Earthly Delights sculpture trail	Figures taken from the Hieronymus Bosch work The Garden of Earthly Delights	2016
Bath	King Bladud's Pigs	104 pigs	2008
Bath	Lions of Bath	100 lions	2010
Bristol	Shaun in the City	Shaun the Sheep visits Bristol in the summer 2015, after the spring 2015 visit to London. To coincide with Shaun the Sheep Movie.	2015
Bristol	Wow! Gorillas	61 gorillas	2011
Colchester	Stand tall	112 giraffes	2013
Dortmund	Dortmunder Nashorn	120 winged rhinos	2005, expanded for 2006 FIFA World Cup
Glasgow	Clyde's Mascot Trail	25 Clydes, the mascot of the 2014 Commonwealth Games	2014
Hamburg	Hans Hummel	100 Hans Hummel	2003
Hannover	Elefanten-Parade	45 elephants	2004'
Istanbul	Shoe Art	500 shoes	2008 September
Hull	Larkin with Toads	40 toads	2010
Kaiserslautern	Fishing for Phantasy	250 fish	2001
Leipzig	LeOLips	100 lions	2002
London	What's in your DNA?	21 double helix sculptures including designed by Zaha Hadid, Orla Kiely and Ai Weiwei	June 29 – September 6, 2015
London	Shaun in the City	50 Shaun the Sheep. Associated with a parade in Bristol in the summer 2015, and release of Shaun the Sheep Movie	March 28 to May 25, 2015
London	Budgie the Little Helicopter Comes to Town		2021
London	The Big Egg Hunt		2012
London	The Paddington Trail	50 Paddington Bears	2014
London	Tusk Rhino Trail	21 rhinos	September 2018
Munich	Löwenparade	500 lions	2004
Neustadt an der Aisch	Aischgruender Karpfen	120 carp	2008 September
Newport South Wales, UK	SuperDragons	60 dragons	2010
Northampton	Pride of Northampton		2010
Norwich	Go Elephants	54 baby elephants	2008
Norwich	GoGoGorillas!	53 gorillas	2013
Paris	Pathé Roosters	50 roosters	2021
Sheffield	Herd of Sheffield	58 elephants	2016
Southampton	Go Rhinos!	rhinos	2013
Versmold	Bunte Borstenviecher	120 pigs	2007
Wells	Swans of Wells	60 swans	2012, to commemorate the Diamond Jubilee of Elizabeth II
Wolverhampton	Wolves in Wolves	30 wolves	5 July 5, 2017 – 24 September 2017
Wuppertal	Pinguinale	200 penguins	2006
Zürich	Teddy-Summer	630 teddy-bears	2005

=== North America ===
- Anaheim, California, baseball player Mickey Mouse, for the 2010 MLB All-Star Week
- Anchorage, Alaska, "Wild Salmon on Parade" (2005)
- Ann Arbor, Michigan, "Wolverines on Parade" (2023)
- Atlanta, Georgia, "Dolphins on Parade" (2011)
- Austin, Texas, "GuitarTown" (2007)
- Baltimore, Maryland, "Fish Out Of Water" (2001), "Crabtown Project" (2005)
- Baraboo, Wisconsin, "Bozo the Clown Comes to Town" (2021)
- Bennington, Vermont, "Moosefest" (2005 & 2009) "PaletteFest" (2006)
- Blacksburg, Virginia, "Gobble de Art" (2006)
- Bloomington, Indiana "Brain Extravaganza" (2012) (22 fiberglass brains)
- Boyertown, Pennsylvania, "Bear Fever"
- Bradenton, Florida, "GECKOFest" (2006)
- Brevard County, Florida "Shuttles Orbiting the Space Coast" (2009)
- Bucks County, Pennsylvania, "Miles of Mules"
- Buffalo, New York, "Herd About Buffalo"
- Cadiz, Kentucky, "Meet the Pigs of Cadiz, Kentucky"
- Cairo, New York, "Bears and Butterflies" (2009–2011)
- Calgary, Alberta, with lifesize cow statues, as a nod to the cattle industry in Alberta
- Catskill, New York, "Cat-N-Around Catskill" (2007–2013)
- Cedar Rapids, Iowa, "Overalls All Over" (2001)
- Chestnut Hill, Philadelphia, Pennsylvania, "AbZOOlutely Chestnut Hill" (2006)
- Chicago, "Horses of Honor" (2015), "Garfield Goose Comes to Town" (2022)
- Cincinnati, Ohio, "Big Pig Gig"
- Clearwater, Florida, "Dolphin Trail" (2012)
- Cleveland, Ohio, "GuitarMania" (2012)
- Crystal City, Virginia, "Crystal Flight" (2008)
- Dallas, Texas, "Pegasus" (2001)
- Detroit, Michigan, "Tigers on Parade" (2022)
- Dothan, Alabama, "Peanuts Around Town" (2001)
- Edmonton, Alberta, Canada, "Bison" (2005)
- El Segundo, California, "Matty Mattel Comes to Town" (2021)
- Elkhart County, Indiana, "ElkArt on Parade" (2011)
- Erie, Pennsylvania, "GoFish!" (2000), "LeapFrog" (2004)
- Eugene, Oregon, "Ducks on Parade" (2002)
- Flagstaff, Arizona "PAWS" (2009)
- Germantown, Tennessee "The Horses are Coming! The Horses are Coming!" (21 Horses) (2008)
- Glendale, Ohio, Black Squirrels
- Glens Falls, New York, "Have a Seat" (Painted Chairs) (2011)
- Gloucester County, Virginia, Beehives (2001)
- Halifax, Nova Scotia, "Lobsters" (2005)
- Hudson, New York, Dogs (2008 & 2009) (Since they're across the river from Catskill's Cats)
- Indiana, "Bison-Tennial" (2016)
- Iowa City, Iowa, "Herky on Parade" (2004)
- Irvington, New York, "Bulldog Gallery" (2023, 2024), inspired by "Cat-N-Around Catskill"
- Jacksonville, Florida, "The Manatees of Jacksonville" (2005)
- Jasper, Alabama, "20-Mule Team Public Art Project" (2011)
- Juneau, Alaska, "Whale Tail Trail" (2012)
- Lakeland, Florida, "Swansation" (2002)
- Langley, British Columbia, "Horsing around Langley"
- Las Vegas, Nevada, "An Affair of the Art" (2013)
- Lexington, North Carolina, "Pigs in the City"
- Los Angeles, California, "A Community of Angels"
- Louisville, Kentucky, "Gallopalooza"
- Madison, Wisconsin, "Bucky on Parade" (2018)
- Memphis, Tennessee, "Tigers Around Town" (100 Tigers) (2011)
- Miami, Florida, "Rooster Walk" (2002)
- Mountain Towns of New York (Windham, Hunter, and surrounding areas), "Rip Lives" (Small concrete replicas of Rip Van Winkle) (2010–2012)
- Naperville, Illinois, United Way hosts an annual exhibit (2001–2007)
- Nappanee, Indiana, "Apple-Picking" (2013)
- New Braunfels, Texas,"Stein Parade" (2006)
- New York, New York, "MLB Statues On Parade" (June–July 2008)
- New Orleans, Louisiana, "Paws on Parade" (2012) "Festival of Fins" (2000)
- Norfolk, Virginia, "Mermaids on Parade" (2000)
- North Tonawanda, New York, "Carousel Horses on Parade" (2021)
- Ocala, Florida, "Painted Horse Trail" (2001)
- Odessa, Texas, "Jackrabbit Jamboree" (2004)
- Oklahoma, "Spirit of the Buffalo"
- Ottawa, Ontario, tulips, at the Ottawa Tulip Festival 2005 in Major's Hill Park and at the Canadian National Exhibition Direct Energy Centre
- Oxford, Maryland, "Take a Tour of Oxford's Picket Fences" (2009)
- Park Ridge, Illinois, "Promise of Park Ridge" (2008)
- Pensacola, Florida, "Pelicans in Paradise"
- Philadelphia, Pennsylvania, "Phanatic Around Town Project" (2010), "Donkeys Around Town" (2016)
- Pinecrest, Florida "SmARTy Dogs for Smart Schools" (2011)
- Pittsfield, Massachusetts, "Sheeptacular" (2004)
- Pittsburgh, Pennsylvania, "DINO-mite Days" (2000)
- Providence, Rhode Island, Mr. Potato Head (2000)
- Racine, Wisconsin, "Monumental Squares" (2014), "Summer Block Buster" (2013), "Summer Trunk Show" (2012), "Potsarazzi" (2011), "Hour Town" (2010), "Sunny and Chair" (2009), "Sphere Madness" (2008), "Lighten Up" (2007), "Bird is the Word" (2006), "Downtown Summer Splash" (2005), "Downtown Bears It All" (2004), "Cat'n Around Downtown" (2003), "Dog Days of Summer" (2002)
- Richmond, Virginia, "Go Fish!" (2001)
- Rochester, New York, "Horses on Parade" (2001), "Benches on Parade" (2009)
- Salem, Oregon, "Salmon in the City" (2005)
- Sarasota, Florida, "Superheroes on Parade, hosted by Southeastern Guide Dogs " (2016)
- St. John's, Newfoundland and Labrador, "Mermaids in the City" (2006)
- St. Joseph, Michigan, "Lighting Up St. Joseph" (lighthouses, 2014), "All Aboard!" (2013), "Beached Pirates" (2012), "Barnyard at the Beach" (2011), "Hot Diggity Dogs" (2010), "Surf 'n Safari" (2009), "Boats-n-Beaches" (2008), "Hot Cars Cool Beaches" (2007), "Beach Bears" (2006), "Horses on the Beach" (2004, 2005)
- St. Louis, "Cakeway to the West" (2014)
- Saint Paul, Minnesota "Peanuts on Parade" (2000-2004)
- San Francisco, California, "Hearts in San Francisco" (2004–2013)
- San Jose, California, "SharkByte" (2001)
- Santa Fe, New Mexico, "Trail of the Painted Ponies".
- Santa Rosa, California, "Peanuts on Parade" (2005, 2006, 2007)
- Saratoga Springs, New York, "Horses, Saratoga Style" (2002, 2007)
- Saugerties, New York, "Hors'n Around Saugerties" (2009 & 2010); "Shine On Saugerties (Lighthouses) (2011); "Sittin' Around Saugerties (Chairs) (2012)
- Seattle, Washington, "Pigs on Parade" (2001, 2007); "Ponies on Parade" (2004); "Nutcracker March" (2006) "Huskies on Parade" (2021)
- Sedona, Arizona, "Javalinas on Parade" (2006)
- Toledo, Ohio, "It's Reigning Frogs" (2001); "Rockets on Parade" (2023)
- Toronto, Ontario, "Moose in the City" (2000)
- Troy, New York, "Uncle Sam Statues" (2013)
- Tucson, Arizona, "Ponies del Pueblo"
- Tulsa, Oklahoma, "Penguins on Parade" (2002); "Captain Cane Comes to Town" (2023)
- Vancouver, British Columbia, "Orcas in the City" (2004); "Spirit Bears in the City" (2006); "Eagles in the City" (2009–2010); "Terracotta Warriors" (2012); "K.C. Bear's Travel" (2023)
- Vancouver, Washington, "HeArts of Clark County" (2013)
- Victoria, British Columbia, "Spirit Bears in the City" (multiple cities) (2005–2006); "Whales"
- Virginia Beach, Virginia, "A Dolphin's Promise" (2005)
- Waco, Texas, "Bears on Parade" (2024)
- Washington, D.C., "Party Animals" (2002), "PandaMania" (2004), "Art in Bloom" (2021)
- Willimantic, Connecticut, "FrogFest"
- Wilmington, Vermont, "Bears in the Valley" (2007), "VerMonsters" (Recycled Object Art) (2008), "Painted Adirondack Chairs" (2010)
- Wimberley, Texas, "Bootiful Wimberley" (2025)
- Winnipeg, Manitoba, "Bears on Broadway" (2005)

== Criticism ==
CowParade has been criticized by contributing artists for their selectivity standards; David Lynch's cow with its flesh partially ripped off, and organs showing, was rejected. The explanation is that this particular CowParade cow was rejected by the City of New York, not the CowParade organisation.

== See also ==
- Bund Bull
- Charging Bull
- Cool Globes: Hot Ideas for a Cooler Planet
- Concrete Cows
- Elephant Parade
- Gladys the Swiss Dairy Cow
- The Big Egg Hunt
- United Buddy Bears
