= Gromit Unleashed =

Public charity art trail

Coordinates: 51°27′N 2°35′W

- The logo for the trail
- Artist: Various designers
- Year: 2013
- Completion date: 1 July 2013 8 September 2013
- Medium: Decorated fibreglass statues
- Subject: Gromit
- Location: Bristol, London
- Owner: Wallace & Gromit’s Grand Appeal and Aardman Animations
- Followed by: Shaun in the City
- Website: gromitunleashed.org.uk

Gromit Unleashed was a public charity art trail led by Wallace & Gromit's Grand Appeal and Aardman Animations, in which 80 giant artist-decorated fibreglass sculptures of Gromit were displayed on the streets of Bristol and the surrounding area between 1 July and 8 September 2013. At the end of the art trail, the sculptures were auctioned to raise funds for Wallace & Gromit's Grand Appeal, the Bristol Children's Hospital Charity. The Grand Appeal pledged to raise £3.5 million for state-of-the-art equipment for Bristol Children's Hospital, including an intraoperative MRI scanner, family facilities and child-friendly artwork to help save the lives of sick children at the hospital. All funds raised by Gromit Unleashed contributed towards this. The project follows the concept of the "Land in Sicht", the original Swiss project by artistic director Walter Knapp which inspired the subsequent worldwide exhibition "CowParade" and similar exhibitions in other cities, including Wow! Gorillas which took place in Bristol in 2011. To date Gromit Unleashed has raised over £5 million for Bristol Children's Hospital.

== Background ==
=== Gromit ===
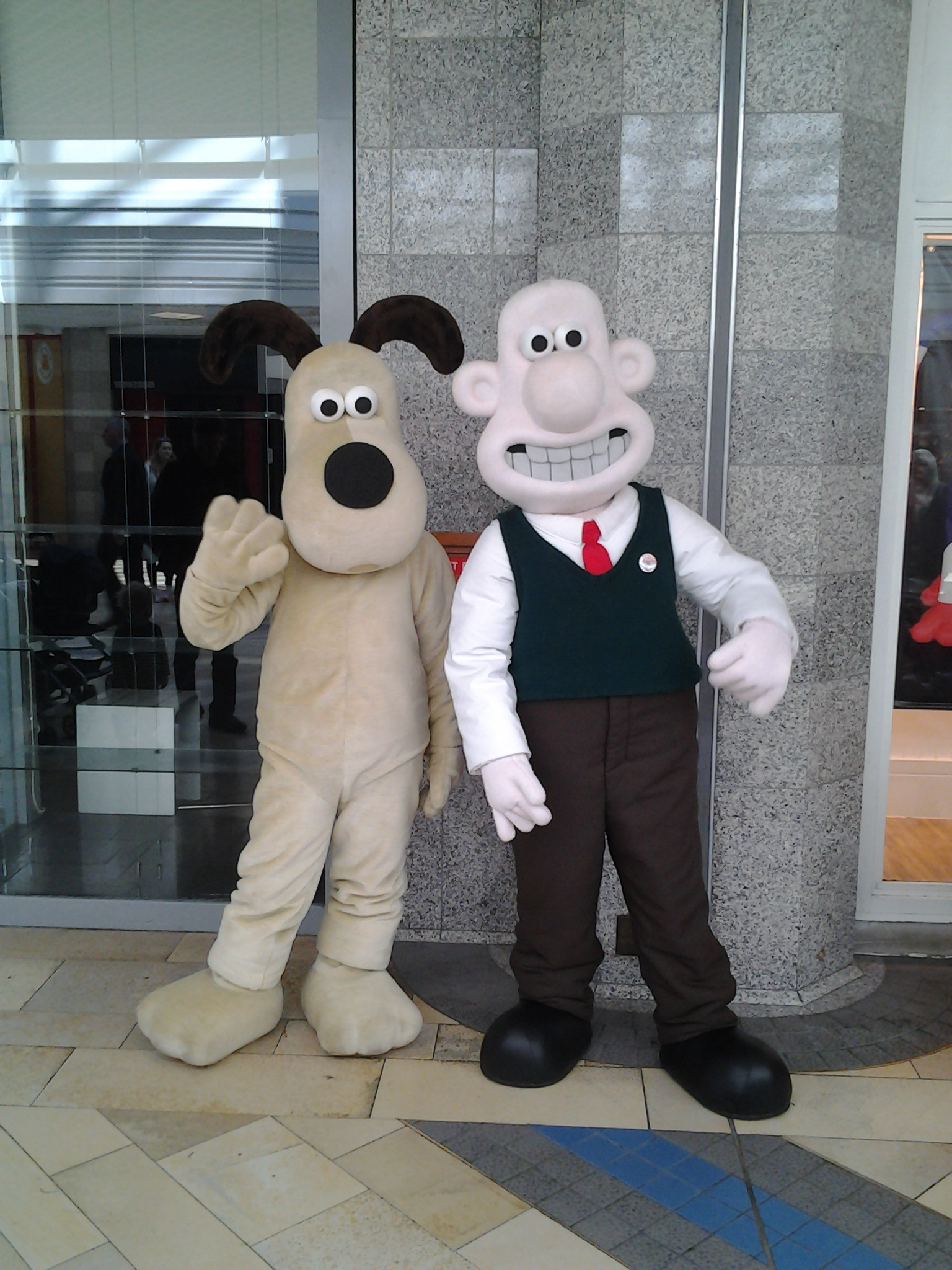
People in Wallace (right) and Gromit (left) costumes, raising money for the charity

Gromit is a dog belonging to an eccentric inventor, Wallace, in a series of claymation films produced by Aardman Animations, based in Spike Island, Bristol. Three of the films in the Wallace and Gromit film series have won Academy Awards: The Wrong Trousers, A Close Shave and Wallace & Gromit: The Curse of the Were-Rabbit.

=== Wallace and Gromit's Grand Appeal ===
The aim of Gromit Unleashed was to fundraise for Wallace and Gromit's Grand Appeal. Founded in 1995, the charity raises funds for paediatric medical equipment at the Bristol Royal Hospital for Children and St. Michael's Hospital. In collaboration with Aardman, it uses the characters Wallace and Gromit as mascots for the charity.

Funds were raised through the sale of trail maps, merchandise, and Detect-o-Gromit, a smartphone app, aimed at helping users find the Gromit sculptures, costing 69p per download. On the first week, Detect-o-Gromit reached #1 on the Entertainment chart and #2 on the Paid chart on Apple's App Store.

== Sculptures ==
=== Creation ===
A Gromit statue prior to decoration. These undecorated statues were distributed to celebrities and artists to freely design.

In the months prior to the trail, 79 blank fibreglass statues measuring 5 feet (1.5 m) in height were distributed to designers and celebrities selected by Nick Park. Each recipient was free to design their statue as they wished, producing a vast array of designs. Some of the statues were publicly painted by their designers in the Galleries shopping centre. Each statue was then transported to an undisclosed warehouse in Bristol to be treated with a lacquer and erected onto a concrete plinth. Nick Park's own sculpture, Newshound, is the only sculpture which feature Wallace, alongside his trusty canine sidekick Gromit.

On 1 July 2013, the statues were distributed around Bristol and tourist attractions in the Greater Bristol area. One was also placed at London Paddington station, but was moved to the Gromit Unleashed HQ for the final week of the exhibition. Sculptures were decorated by a range of artists and celebrities, including Joanna Lumley, Sir Peter Blake, Trevor Baylis and Jools Holland. The Royal Mint and mosaic artist Stephanie Roberts created a special Royal Mint Gromit, decorated with coins. US Animation studio Pixar contributed Gromit Lightyear, based on their character Buzz Lightyear. The sculptures were auctioned in October to raise funds for Bristol Children's Hospital.

In addition a number of smaller Gromit sculptures were distributed to schools and community groups to decorate. Bristol tourism staff have estimated that Gromit Unleashed could bring as much as £58 million to the city during the two-month display, with many visitors expected from the United States and Japan, where Wallace and Gromit are popular. The local media reported on the use of a new word "Gromiting", being used on social media sites to describe the search for the sculptures.

=== Vandalism ===
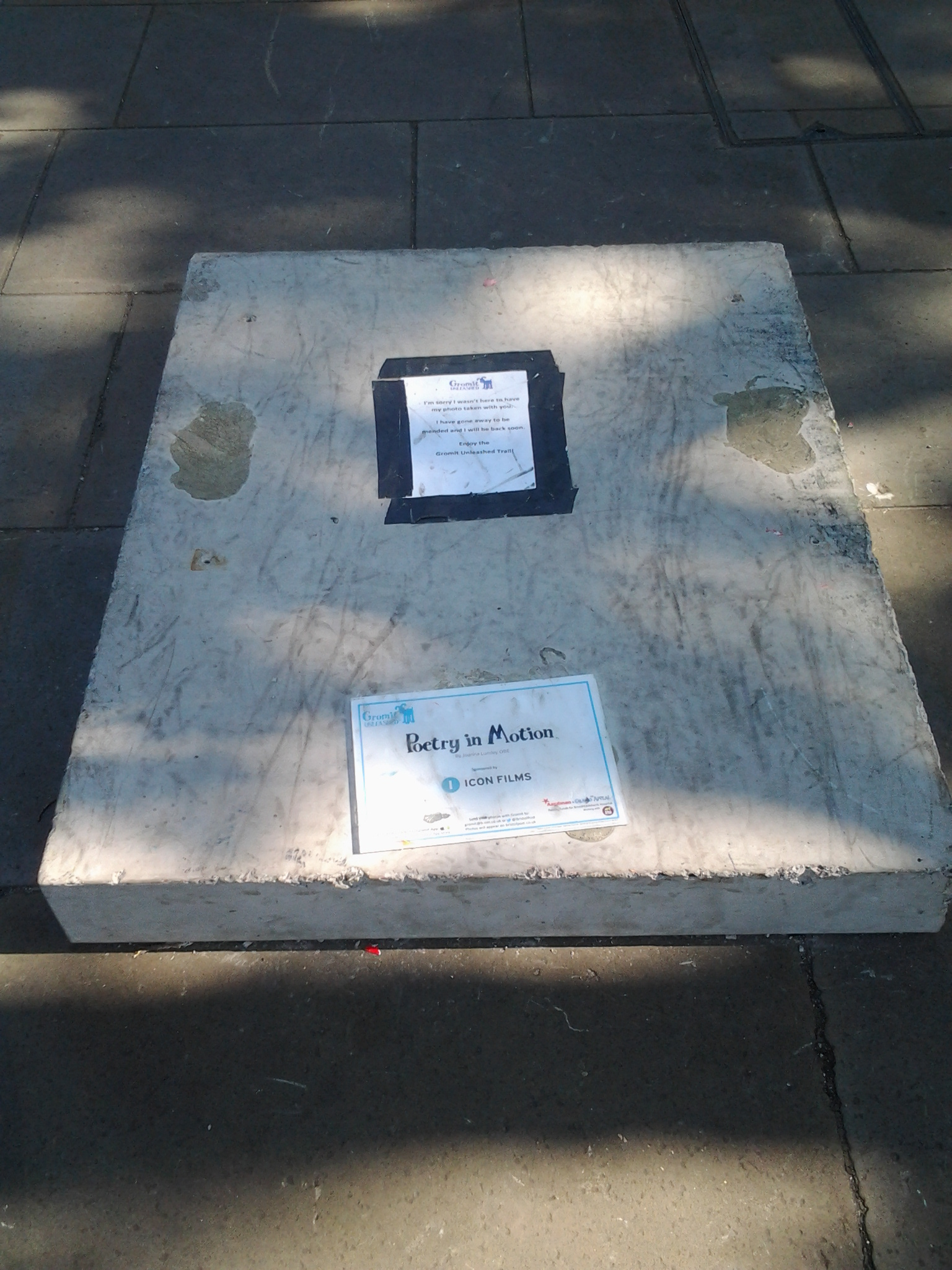
An empty plinth while Poetry in Motion was being repaired.

Due to the openness of the outdoor sculptures in the trail, they were vulnerable to vandalism. In total, five sculptures were vandalised during the exhibition:

- Poetry in Motion by Joanna Lumley was removed before the first day of the trail on 28 June, after vandals ripped off its tail. It was restored and replaced back on 17 July.
- Carosello by Giuliano Carapia was ripped from its plinth two days into the trail (3 July). It was restored and replaced back on 11 July, to applause from bystanders.
- Groscar by Chris Taylor had its ear ripped off on the night of 17 August. It was restored and replaced back on 28 August.
- Bark at Ee by Leigh Flurry and Patch by Emily Golden were also damaged during the trail.

== Auction ==
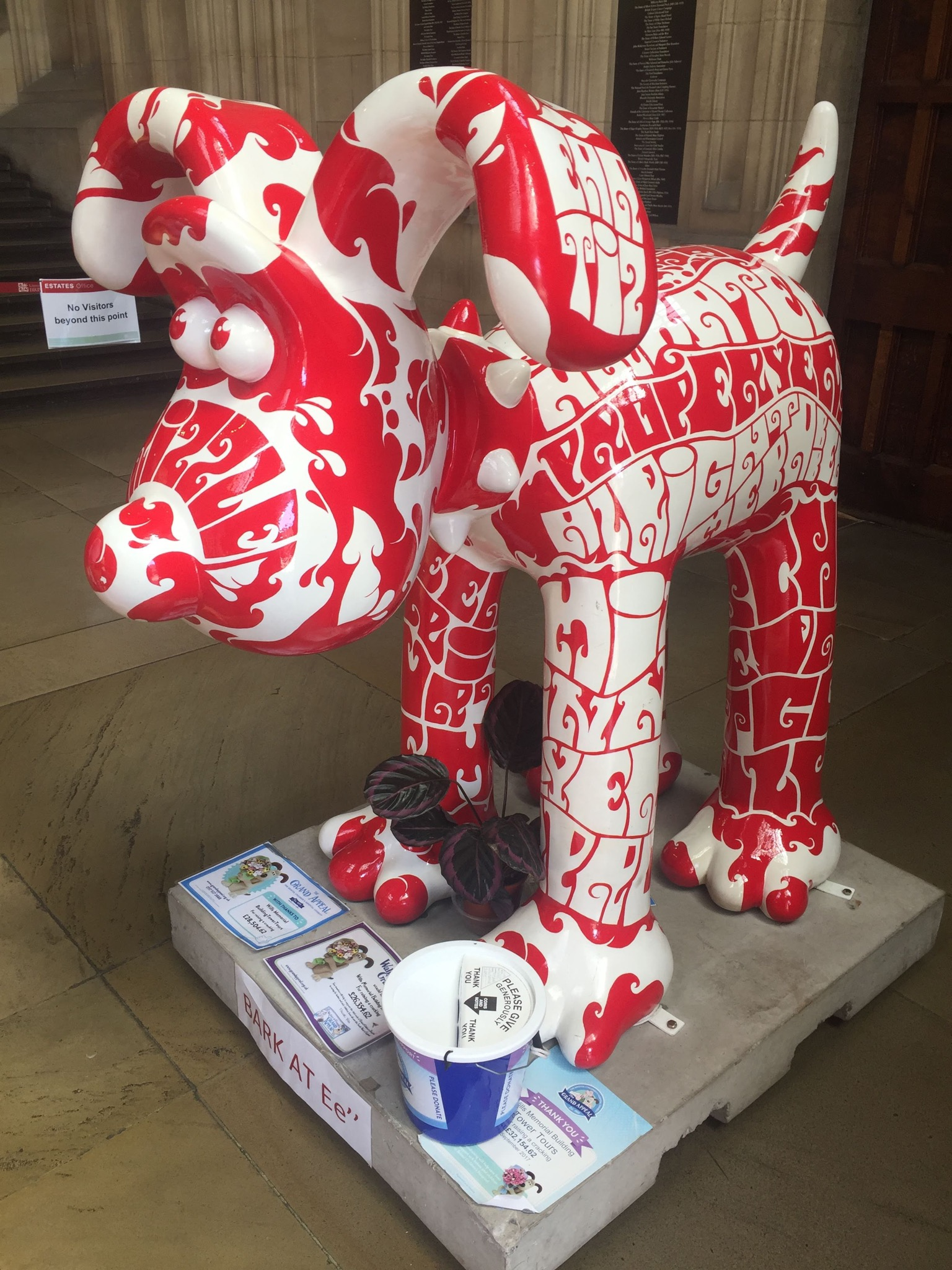
The "Bark at 'Ee" sculpture, which £20,000 to David Clarke, Deputy Vice-Chancellor at Bristol University. It is permanently situated in the Wills Memorial Building, alongside a charity donation box for the Grand Appeal.

After the trail had finished, all of the Gromit statues were collected and displayed together at a marquee at The Mall, Cribbs Causeway, which attracted more than 25,000 visitors.

On 3 October 2013 the 81 statues, alongside 11 smaller statues, were auctioned off at a special event hosted by Sotheby's auctioneer and TV presenter Tim Wonnacott at the marquee. Wonnacott was paid to host the auction, to some criticism, as it was a charitable event. The pressure group Fathers 4 Justice were reportedly banned from bidding on one statue, Hero, over claims that it would use the statue for publicising their campaign if they won it.

The pre-auction estimate for the grand total was £1 million; this was exceeded after the 39th statue was sold. Every statue also exceeded the reserve price of £10,000. The Gromit which attracted the highest bid was Gromit Lightyear, designed by Disney Pixar and based on the Toy Story character Buzz Lightyear which sold for £65,000. The grand total raised from the sale of the sculptures was £2,357,000.

== Impact and legacy ==
The sale of the Gromit statues, app downloads and merchandise initially raised £2.3million for Wallace and Gromit's Grand Appeal. The money was spent on lifesaving medical equipment and products to enhance patient comfort at the Bristol Royal Hospital for Children, during its planned expansion. An intraoperative MRI scanner was bought for the hospital using the funds, which the hospital previously did not have.

Gromit Unleashed's financial success led organisers to plan a sequel almost immediately after the trail finished. David Sproxton, the chair of Aardman Animations, suggested that a trail involving Shaun the Sheep, another Wallace and Gromit character, could be "rolled out nationally... or even internationally". This idea developed into the Shaun in the City sculpture trail, which was held in London and Bristol in the spring and summer of 2015 respectively. A sequel, Gromit Unleashed 2 was unleashed 2018 which features sculpture statues of Gromit, Wallace on a life-size bench, and Feathers McGraw. A third Gromit Unleashed trail has been announced for 2025.

== List of Gromit sculptures ==
All information is taken from the Gromit Unleashed website.

Name	Original Trail Location	Designer	Sale price
A Close Shave	Bristol Tourist Information Centre	Harry Hill	£24,000
A Grand Day Out	Temple Quarter Enterprise Zone	Andy O'Rourke	£24,000
A Mandrill's Best Friend	Bristol Zoo	Vivi Cuevas	£18,000
aMazing Gromit	Cheddar Gorge, Somerset	Tom Berry	£24,000
Antique Rose	The Mall at Cribbs Causeway	Cath Kidston	£30,000
Astro Dog	Millennium Square	Ignition DG Ltd	£21,000
Bark at Ee	Queen Square	Leigh Flurry	£20,000
Being Gromit Malkovich	SS Great Britain	Thomas Dowdeswell	£21,000
Blazing Saddles	DoubleTree by Hilton, Bristol City Centre	Carys Ink	£21,000
Blossom	The Downs	Emily Ketteringham	£24,000
Bristol Bulldog	Bristol Airport	Dan Shearn	£26,000
Bumble Boogie	Colston Hall	Jools Holland	£20,000
Bunty	St Mary Redcliffe	Paula Bowles	£31,000
Bushed	Royal West of England Academy	David Inshaw	£24,000
Butterfly	Bristol Old Vic	Philip Treacy	£20,000
Canis Major	Hotel du Vin, Bristol	Katy Christianson	£26,000
Carosello	Spyglass, Welsh Back	Giuliano Carapia	£16,000
Collarfull	Castle Park	Hannah Cumming	£22,000
Creature Comforts	Riverside Garden Centre, Clift House Road	Sneaky Raccoon	£19,000
Dog Rose	Whiteladies Road	Ros Franklin	£20,000
Doodles	Cabot Circus	Simon Tofield	£34,000
Eldoradog	Westonbirt Arboretum, Gloucestershire	Seb Burnett	£28,000
Feathers	Gloucester Road	Dave Bain	£25,000
Fiesta	Avon Gorge Hotel, Clifton	Lindsay McBirnie	£28,000
Fish Tales	Blue Reef Aquarium	Jeremy Wade	£20,000
Five a Day Dog	Henleaze Road, Henleaze	Laura Cramer	£22,000
Gizmo	Art of Gromit Unleashed Shop, Upper Maudlin Street	Quentin Blake	£32,000
Gnashional Gromit	Bristol Marriott City Centre hotel	The Beano	£28,000
Golden Gromit	Victoria Rooms	Julie Vernon	£30,000
Grant's Gromit	Ashton Court	Rosie Ashforth	£36,000
The Green Gromit	The Mall at Cribbs Causeway	Zayn Malik	£26,000
Grom Voyage!	The Greatest Dog Show on Earth, Bristol	Vivi Cuevas	£20,000
Gromberry	The Pump House, Hotwells	Simon Tozer	£32,000
Gromit	London Paddington station	Aardman Animations	£35,000
Gromit Lightyear	Showcase Cinema de Lux, Cabot Circus	Pixar	£65,000
Gromit-o-Matic	Brunel Mile, Bristol	Donough O'Malley	£26,000
Gromitasaurus	The Galleries	Huncan Daskell	£24,000
The Grommalo	Bristol Central Library	Axel Scheffler	£26,000
Groscar	Thunderbolt Square, Bristol	Chris Taylor	£28,000
Grosmos	Harvey Nichols, Cabot Circus	Cheba	£28,000
Grrrrromit	Windmill Hill City Farm	Carys Ink	£26,000
Harmony	The Beaufort Arms, Hawkesbury Upton	Marie Simpson	£23,000
Hero	Subway, Bristol city centre	Tom Deams	£26,000
Hound Dog	Arnolfini	Peter Blake	£28,000
Hullaballoon	Arnos Vale Cemetery	Monster Riot	£26,000
Isambark Kingdog Brunel	Bristol Temple Meads railway station	Tim Miness	£36,000
It's Kraken, Gromit!	The Downs, Bristol	Filthy Luker	£18,000
Jack	Hargreaves Lansdown, Anchor Road	Martin Band	£36,000
The King	King Street	Stephen McKay	£25,000
Lancelot	Quakers Friars	Paul Smith	£22,000
Lodekka	Lawrence Hill Roundabout	Ignition DG Ltd	£28,000
Malago	Broadmead	Dan Collings	£24,000
May Contain Nuts (& Bolts)	Inside Bristol Temple Meads railway station	Natalie Guy	£30,000
National Treasure	M Shed	Royal Mint	£28,000
NewFoundLand	The Matthew, Bristol Harbour	One Red Shoe	£30,000
Newshound	Bristol Museum & Art Gallery	Nick Park	£50,000
Nezahualcoyotl	Stanfords, Corn Street	Joseph Dunmore	£20,000
Oops a Daisy	Tyntesfield, Wraxall	Diarmuid Gavin	£22,000
Paisley	North Street, Bedminster	Nia Samuel-Johnson	£21,000
Patch	Clifton Hill	Emily Golden	£36,000
Poetry in Motion	College Green	Joanna Lumley	£35,000
Poochadelic	County Cricket Ground, Bristol	Lisa Hassell	£25,000
Roger	Top to Bottom Ltd, Staple Hill	Richard Williams	£29,000
Salty Sea Dog	The Cascade Steps, Bristol city centre	Peter Lord	£32,000
The Secret Garden	Lye Cross Farm, Redhill, Somerset	Sarah Jane Grace	£44,000
Sheepdog	The Mall Gardens, Clifton	Richard Starzak	£23,000
Ship Shape & Bristol Fashion	Sion Hill	Sarah Matthews	£26,000
Sir Gromit of Bristol	St George's Bristol	Ian Marlow	£28,000
Snow Gromit	Junction 3 Library, Baptist Mills	Raymond Briggs	£32,000
Stat's the Way to Do It, Lad	Aardman Animations	Gavin Strange	£29,000
Steam Dog	We The Curious (Note: We The Curious was called At-Bristol at the time of the Gromit Unleashed trail.)	Dan Shearn	£26,000
Sugar Plum	Redgrave Theatre	Celia Birtwell	£22,000
TutanGromit I	Bristol Museum & Art Gallery	Dale Evans	£24,000
Two Eds are Better than One	Woodlands Lane, Bradley Stoke	Peter Brookes	£23,000
Vincent van Gromit	Elton Road, University of Bristol	Laura Cramer	£25,000
Watch Out Gromit!	M Shed	Gerald Scarfe	£50,000
What a Wind Up	Redcliffe Street	Trevor Baylis	£25,000
Where's Wallace	Marriott Royal Hotel, Bristol	Martin Handford	£30,000
Why Dog? Why?	St Nicholas Market	Mark Titchner	£18,000
The Wild West	Cribbs Causeway Retail Park	Amy Timms	£22,000
Zodiac	Arnolfini	Inkie	£24,000

== See also ==
- Gromit Unleashed 2
- Shaun in the City
