= SuperDragons =

Public art exhibition in Newport, Wales

SuperDragons is a community-arts initiative of Newport City Council. Modelled on the worldwide CowParade public art exhibitions, local artists were asked to submit designs with the winners being turned into community artwork by the artists themselves. So far the initiative has taken place in 2010 and 2012 with approximately 60 large, decorated, fibreglass dragons being presented on each occasion.

The 2010 event was arranged to celebrate the city's hosting of the Ryder Cup. After they had been on display from June to September 2010, most of these SuperDragons were auctioned, raising almost £100,000 for charity, while a few were later on display around the city at locations including Newport International Sports Village, Newport Museum and the Riverfront Arts Centre.
