= Royal Hotel, Bristol =

The Royal Hotel
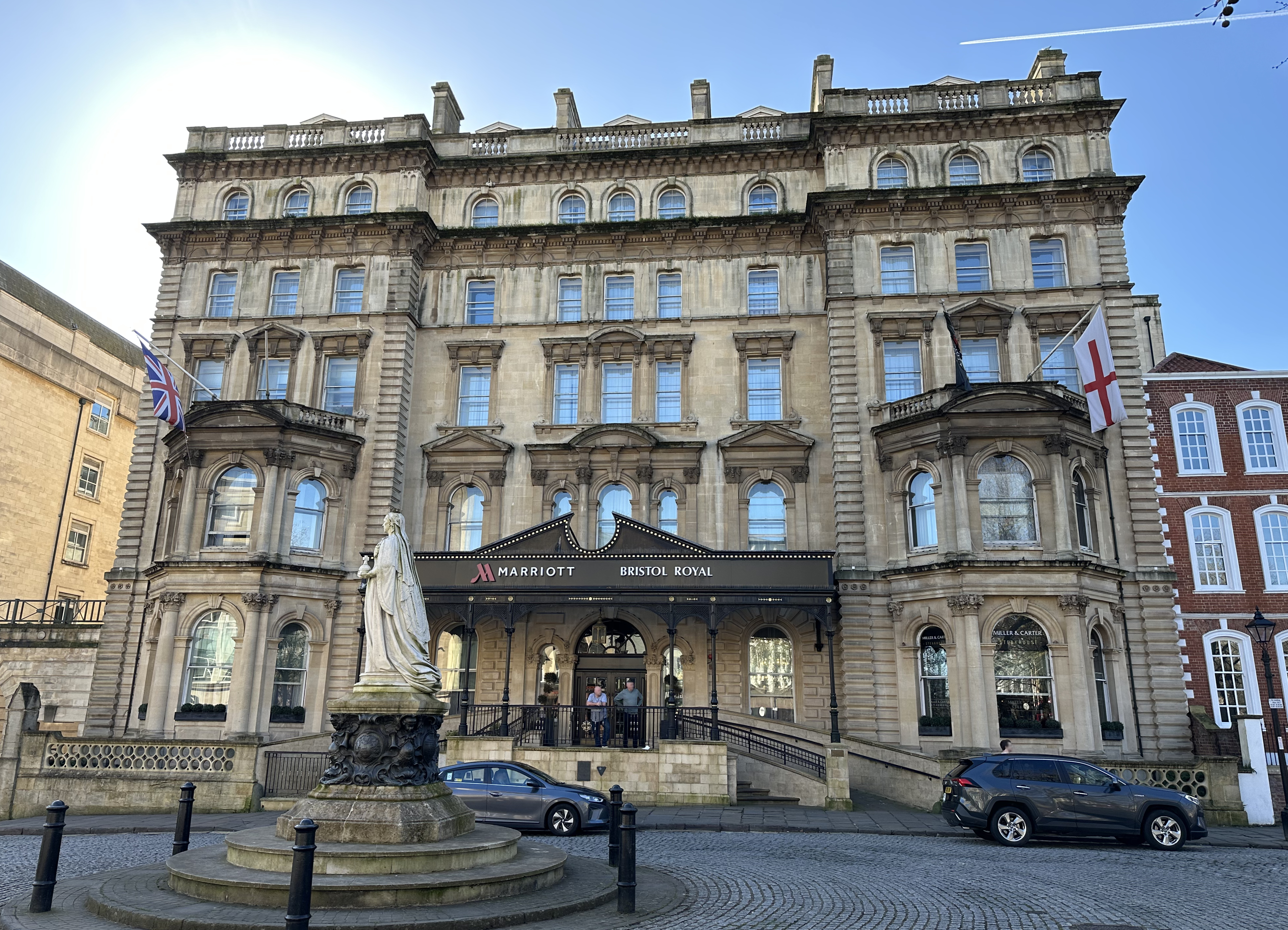
- The Bristol Marriott Royal Hotel, 2026

- Location within Bristol
- 51°27′07″N 2°35′57″W
- Type: Hotel
- Location: College Green, Bristol

Site notes
- Area: Bristol
- Architect: W. H. Hawtin
- Owner: Marriott Hotels & Resorts

Listed Building – Grade II
- Official name: Former Swallow Hotel and attached front entrance balustrades
- Designated: 1978
- Reference no.: 1025010

The Royal Hotel (Bristol Marriott Royal Hotel) was opened on 23 March 1868 as the largest purpose-built hotel in Bristol. It the oldest hotel in the city and has been a Grade II Listed Building since 1978. It operates today as part of Marriott Hotels & Resorts.

== History ==
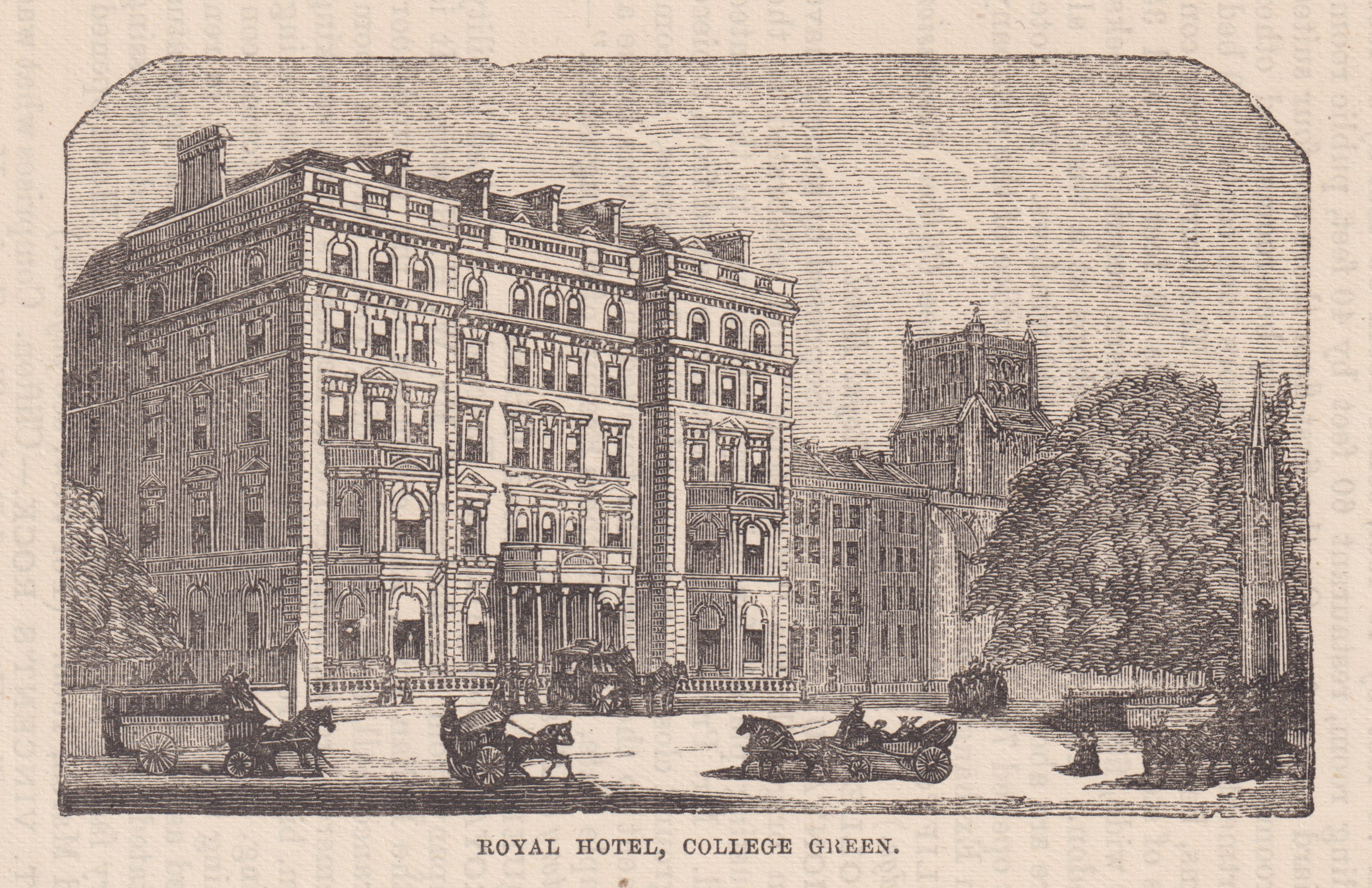
Royal Hotel in 1872

In October 1863, the College Green Hotel Company was formed as a limited liability company, raising £40,000 to acquire and build a hotel on College Green, Bristol. Dwelling houses between Bristol Cathedral and the parish church of St Augustine the Less, were demolished to make way for the new structure. The hotel was designed in the Italian style by the Bristol architect W. H. Hawtin, with over seventy bedrooms and substantial kitchens to facilitate catering for large functions.

Some late Victorian reviewers were unhappy with the quality of the accommodation or food that Bristol's city centre hotels had to offer, which included the Royal Hotel. One complained of the 'unutterable lowness in catering' of the central hotels, with their 'unanalysable compound of liquid impurity which is misnamed coffee'.

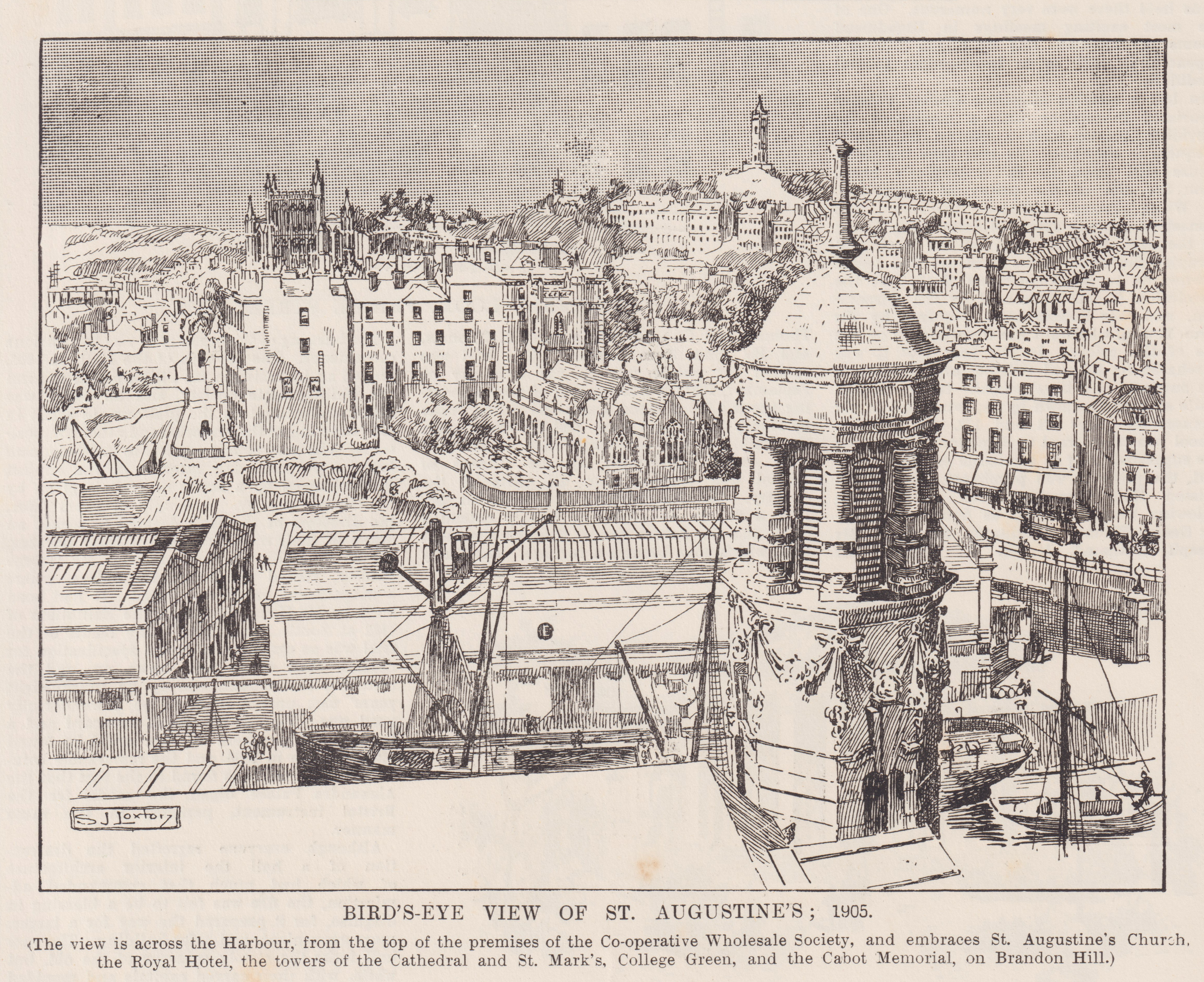
Royal Hotel, St Augustine and Bristol Cathedral by Samuel Loxton, 1905

Contemporaries regarded the Royal Hotel as being of 'colossal proportions', especially in the way that it 'dwarfed' St Augustine. The Bristol journalist and historian, George Frederick Stone, felt the construction of the hotel transformed character of College Green, with the hotel having become its 'dominating feature'. He included an illustration of the area prior to the construction of the hotel as well as a 1905 birds-eye view of the area by Samuel Loxton which illustrates this. The effect became less noticeable over time as other large buildings, such as the Bristol Central Library (1906) and the Council House (1956) were constructed around the Green.

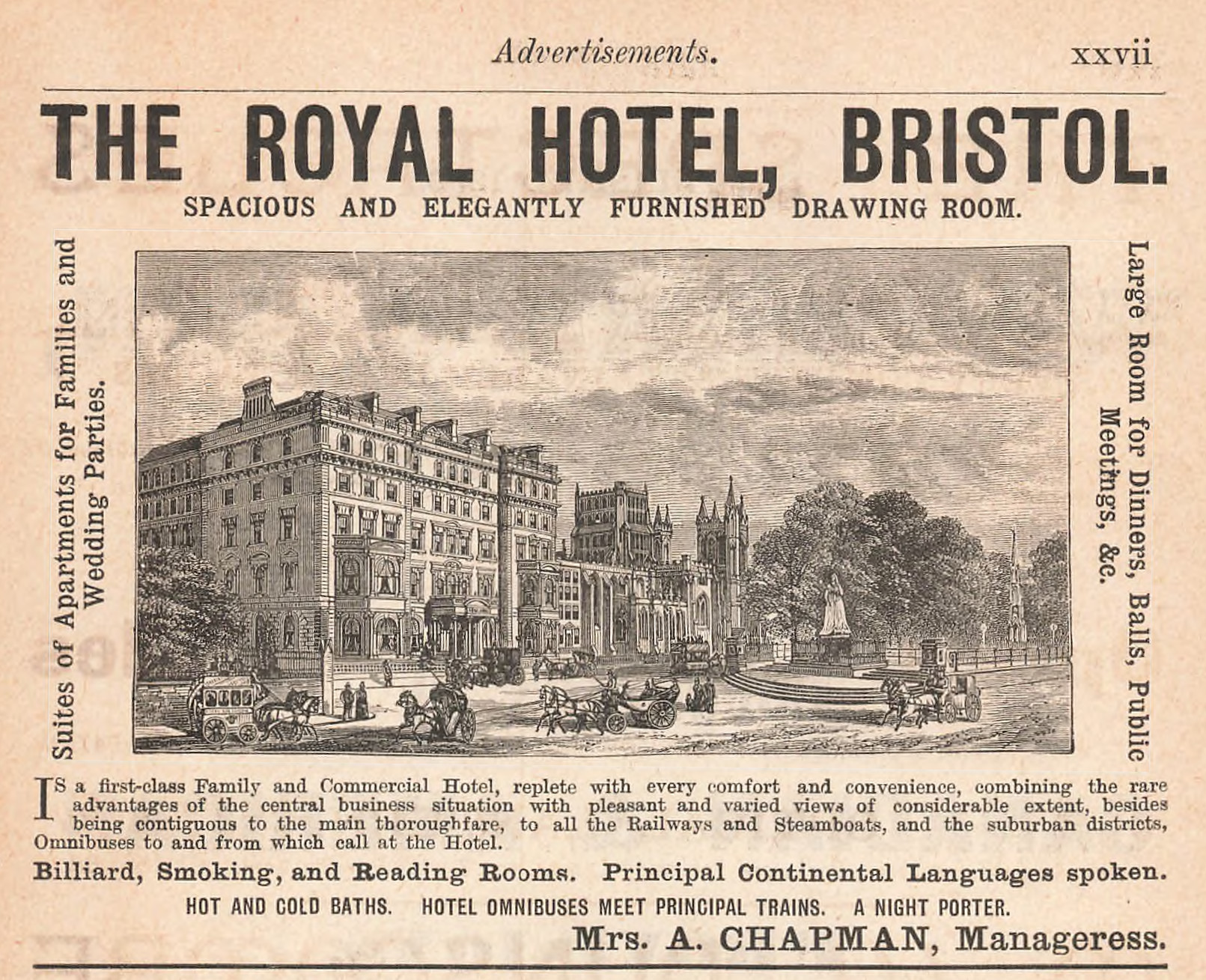
Advert for the Royal Hotel emphasising its service for large functions, 1893

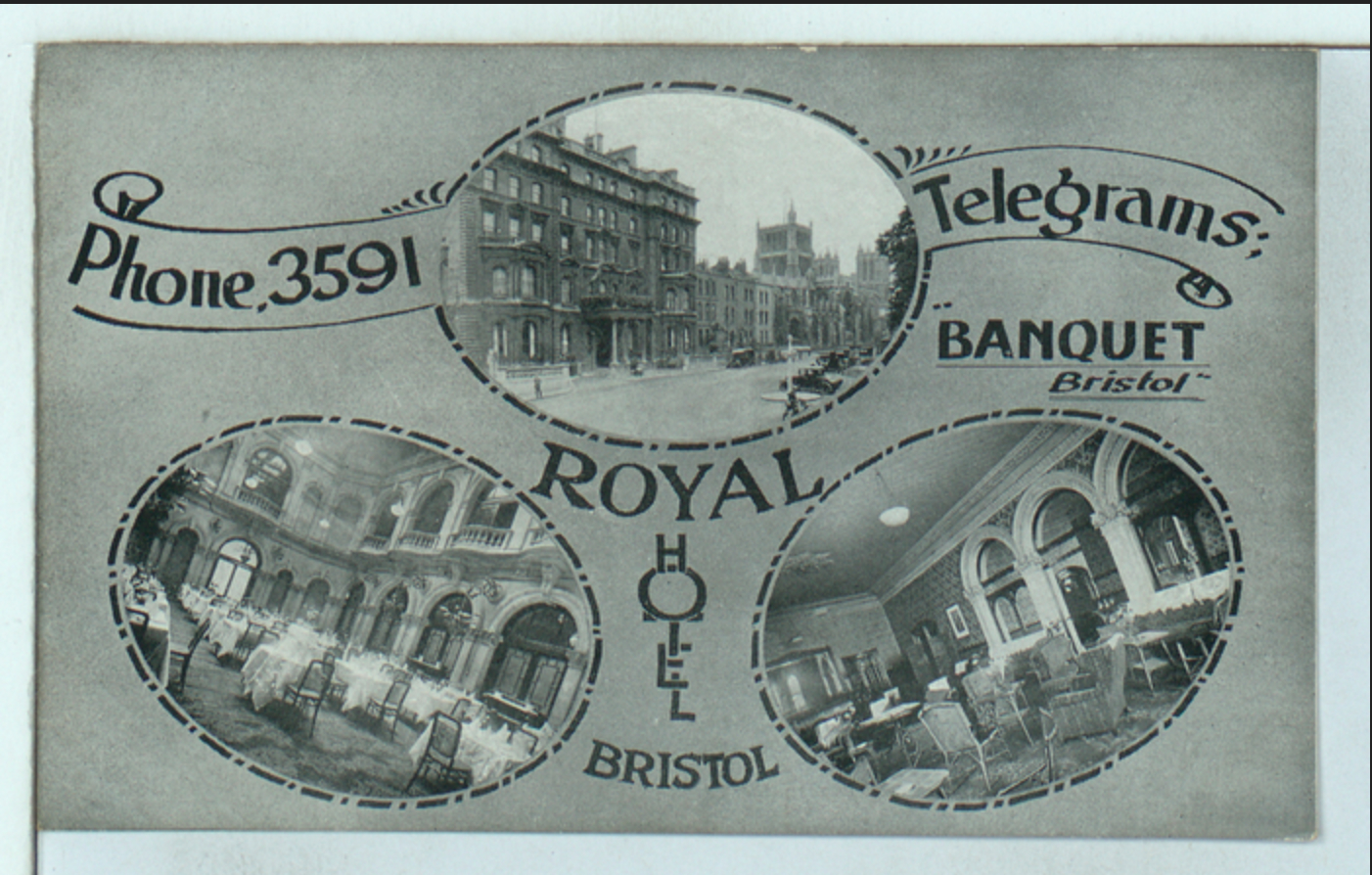
Promotional postcard of the Royal Hotel, 1928

The early twentieth century hotel was regarded as Bristol's chief hotel, particularly for meetings and functions. It was the base for an official campaign to encourage visitors from North America in 1910 and it was the first hotel listed in an official guide to the city published in 1925. By 1935 it had slipped to third place in another civic guide, behind the Grand Hotel in Broad Street and the Grand Spa Hotel in Clifton.

During the twentieth century the hotel published postcards featuring images of the hotel, which could be bought by guests. Bristol Archives have digitised c.18 of these postcards from its Vaughan Collection.

During the 1980s the hotel traded under the name Swallow Royal Hotel, but fell into disuse. In 1991 it was acquired and refurbished by the Marriott group.

== Modern Day ==
The Hotel today operates as part of the Marriott Hotels & Resorts group as the Bristol Marriott Royal Hotel. In 2019 the Daily Telegraph praised its 'multi-million restoration', giving it a 7/10 review.

== Official Website ==
Bristol Marriot Royal Hotel
