= Shaun in the City =

2015 arts trail in Bristol

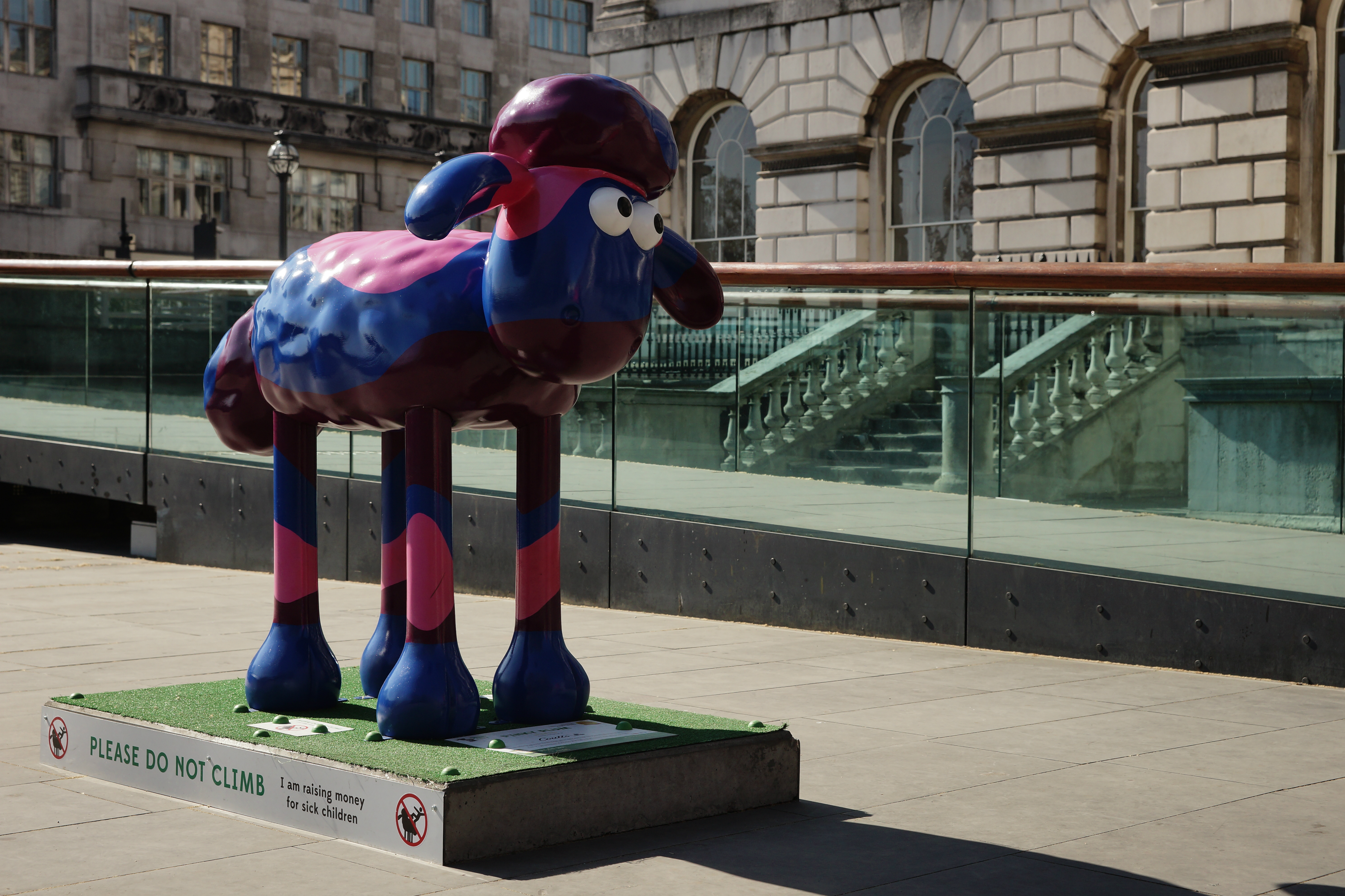

Shaun in the City was a public charity arts trail organised by Wallace & Gromit's Children's Foundation and Aardman Animations, in which 120 giant, artist and celebrity-decorated fibreglass sculptures of Shaun the Sheep were displayed in famous locations and green spaces around London and Bristol. The first 50 Shaun sculptures appeared in London from 28 March to 31 May 2015, with a further 70 Shaun sculptures appearing in Bristol from 6 July to 31 August 2015.

The charity project aims to raise funds for sick children in hospitals across the UK, with funds from the London trail supporting Wallace & Gromit’s Children’s Charity, and funds from the Bristol trail supporting Wallace & Gromit’s Grand Appeal, the Bristol Children's Hospital Charity. It follows on from Gromit Unleashed, a charity arts trail which saw 80 sculptures of Gromit placed on the streets of Bristol in 2013, raising £2.3 million at auction for The Grand Appeal.

== Shaun the Sheep ==
Created by Nick Park of Aardman Animations, Shaun the Sheep is an unusually clever sheep who first appeared in the 1995 Oscar-winning short film A Close Shave, helping Wallace and Gromit to rescue his flock from being turned into dog food by a malfunctioning robotic dog. In 2007 he was given his own stop-motion animated television series, and in 2015 he starred in a feature-length movie, titled Shaun the Sheep the Movie. In 2014 he was voted the nation's favourite children's television character in a poll conducted by the Radio Times and the British Film Institute.

== Shaun in the City London Trail ==
On 24 March 2015, Shaun in the City launched to the public and press in London. A number of sculptures were driven across Tower Bridge and London Bridge on a trailer drawn by a tractor. Nick Park, creator of Shaun the Sheep, was also in attendance, helping to unveil more sculptures in a sheep pen near the Thames.

The 50 London sculptures were placed in famous locations and green spaces around the capital including Trafalgar Square, Tower Bridge, The London Eye, Covent Garden, St. James's Park, and The Shard.

The charity also launched a dedicated Shaun in the City Youtube Channel, showing films promoting the trails and app, interviews with celebrity designers including David Gandy, and behind-the-scenes videos of artists at work.

== Shaun in the City Bristol Trail ==
The Bristol trail launched on 2 July 2015, with Shaun the Sheep creator Nick Park driving a vintage tractor across Clifton Suspension Bridge, pulling a trailer containing several sculptures.

The 70 sculptures were then distributed around the city for the beginning of the trail on 6 July, with locations including Bristol Temple Meads station, Bristol Harbourside, Clifton Suspension Bridge, Staple Hill, and Bedminster. Designs were again contributed by artists and celebrities, with VIP designs including Bagpuss Shaun by Bagpuss creator Peter Firmin, and Sheepish, a giant pink poodle created by fashion designer Wayne Hemingway. Aardman Directors Nick Park and Peter Lord also designed Shaun sculptures.

The charity organisers also created the Shaun in the City: Nature Explorer, a booklet of activities intended to get young children engaging with nature and learning about the environment as they visited six sculptures in green locations throughout Bristol during the trail.

== Shaun in the City: Sheep Spotter App ==
Wallace & Gromit's Grand Appeal and the digital team at Aardman Animations developed an interactive app called Shaun in the City: Sheep Spotter for the two trails, available for Apple and Android devices. Within 24 hours of release the app took the number one spot in the Apple iTunes App Store chart for paid-for apps. By the middle of the Bristol trail over 1,000,000 sculptures had been ticked off using the app, which also allowed visitors to complete special trails, learn about the sculptures and artists, and earn interactive trophies.

== Great Sheep Round Up Exhibitions ==
Following the end of the Bristol trail, all 120 Shaun sculptures from both the London and Bristol trails were united for two special 'Great Sheep Round Up' exhibitions, the first in Bristol at The Mall at Cribbs Causeway, and the second in London's Covent Garden. There was extremely high public demand for tickets for the Bristol exhibition, with over 25,000 visitors attending over the course of nine days.

== Auction ==
On 8 October 2015, all 120 sculptures were auctioned to raise money for sick children in hospitals across the UK, in a special evening hosted by Sotheby's auctioneer and TV presenter Tim Wonnacott. Money raised from the London sculptures benefited Wallace & Gromit's Children's Charity, and money raised from the Bristol sculptures benefited The Grand Appeal, the Bristol Children's Hospital Charity. 5 miniature Shauns – ‘Little Princess’, ‘Jetsetter’, ‘Catch of the Day’, and two Shauns decorated by young patients in Bristol – were also auctioned in aid of Bristol Children's Hospital.

The auction raised £1,087,900 in total for the two charities. The Shaun sculpture which attracted the highest bid on the night was ‘Globetrotter’ by Sarah Matthews, selling for £28,000. ‘Sparkles the Unicorn’ by Emily Golden was also the subject of a bidding war, finally selling for £25,000.
