= Bristol Homeopathic Hospital =

Hospital in England, specialising in homeopathic treatments

- University Hospitals Bristol NHS Foundation Trust
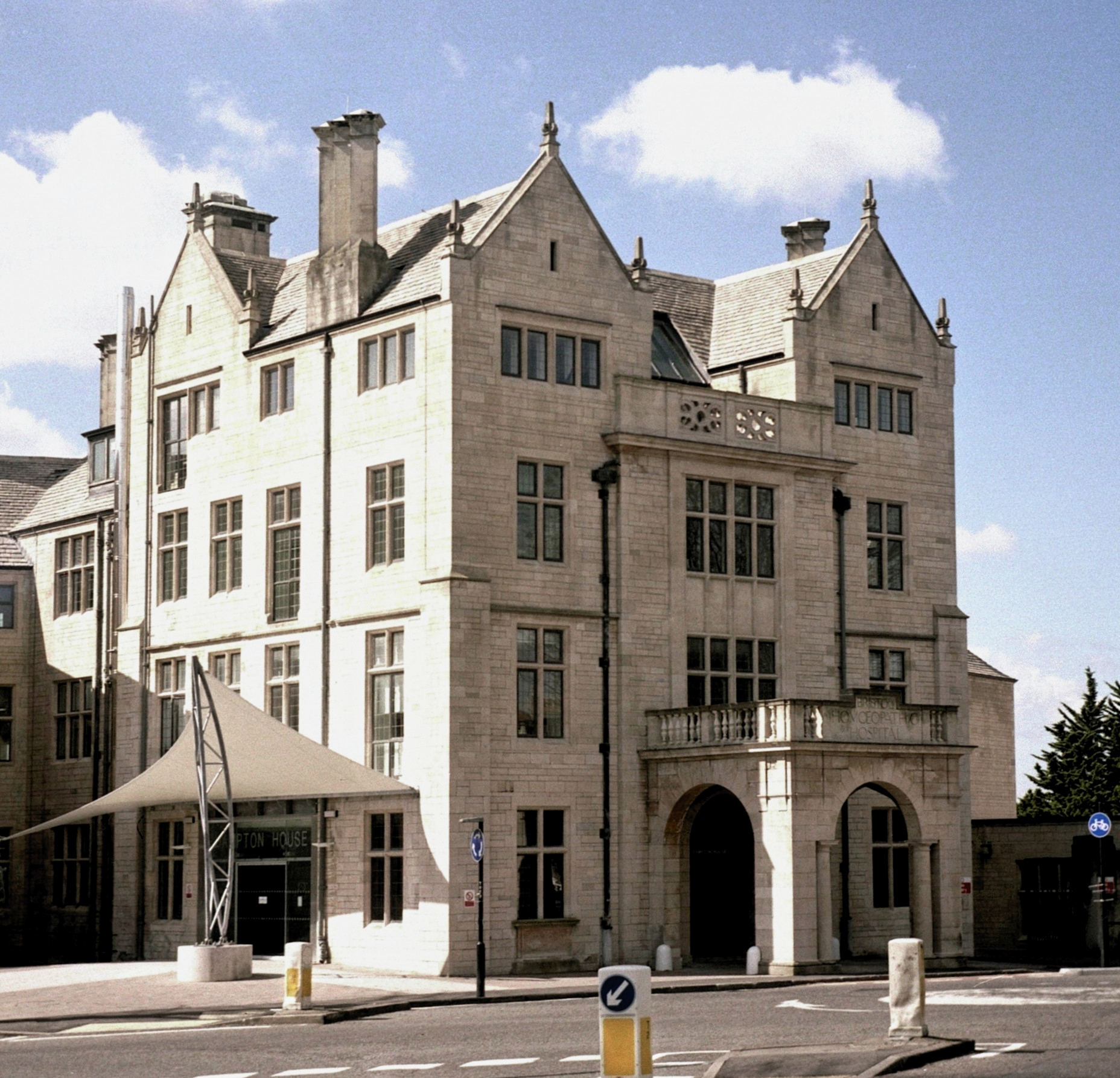
- Hampton House, the former site of Bristol Homeopathic Hospital

- Shown in Bristol

Geography
- Location: Bristol, England, United Kingdom
- Coordinates: 51.4621°N 2.6037°W

Organisation
- Care system: Public NHS
- Type: Teaching

Services
- Speciality: Homeopathy

History
- Founded: 1852
- Closed: 2015

Links
- Lists: Hospitals in England

Bristol Homeopathic Hospital was a hospital in the city of Bristol in southwest England, specialising in homeopathic treatments. The Hampton House building, designed by George Oatley, is a Grade II listed building. Hampton House is now being used as the student health service for Bristol University, offering a range of services to the students of the university.

== History ==
The hospital was founded as a dispensary in 1832 and became a hospital in 1852.

From 1925, the hospital was based in its own building, Hampton House, in the Cotham area of Bristol. It joined the National Health Service in 1948. On 7 January 2013, the hospital moved operations from Cotham to the South Bristol Community Hospital. In-patient services had been provided at Hampton House until 1986, when they were moved to the Bristol Eye Hospital, with out-patients continuing at Hampton House.

Homeopathic services ceased at the hospital in October 2015, partly in response to a 10:23 Campaign, which opposed the public funding of homeopathy, led by the Good Thinking Society and public figures such as Simon Singh and Edzard Ernst. University Hospitals Bristol confirmed to the clinical commissioning group (CCG) that it would cease to offer homeopathic therapies from October 2015, at which point homeopathic therapies would no longer be included in the contract.

Homeopathic services in the Bristol area were relocated to the Portland Centre for Integrative Medicine, described as "a new independent social enterprise." In response to a Freedom of Information Act request, Bristol CCG revealed in 2015 that "there are currently no (NHS) contracts for homeopathy in place with the Portland Centre."

The grounds of the old hospital are now used by Bristol University, housing its health service, counseling service and disabilities service, as well as its department of philosophy and multi-faith chaplaincy.
