= Weston General Hospital =

NHS district hospital

- Bristol NHS Foundation Trust
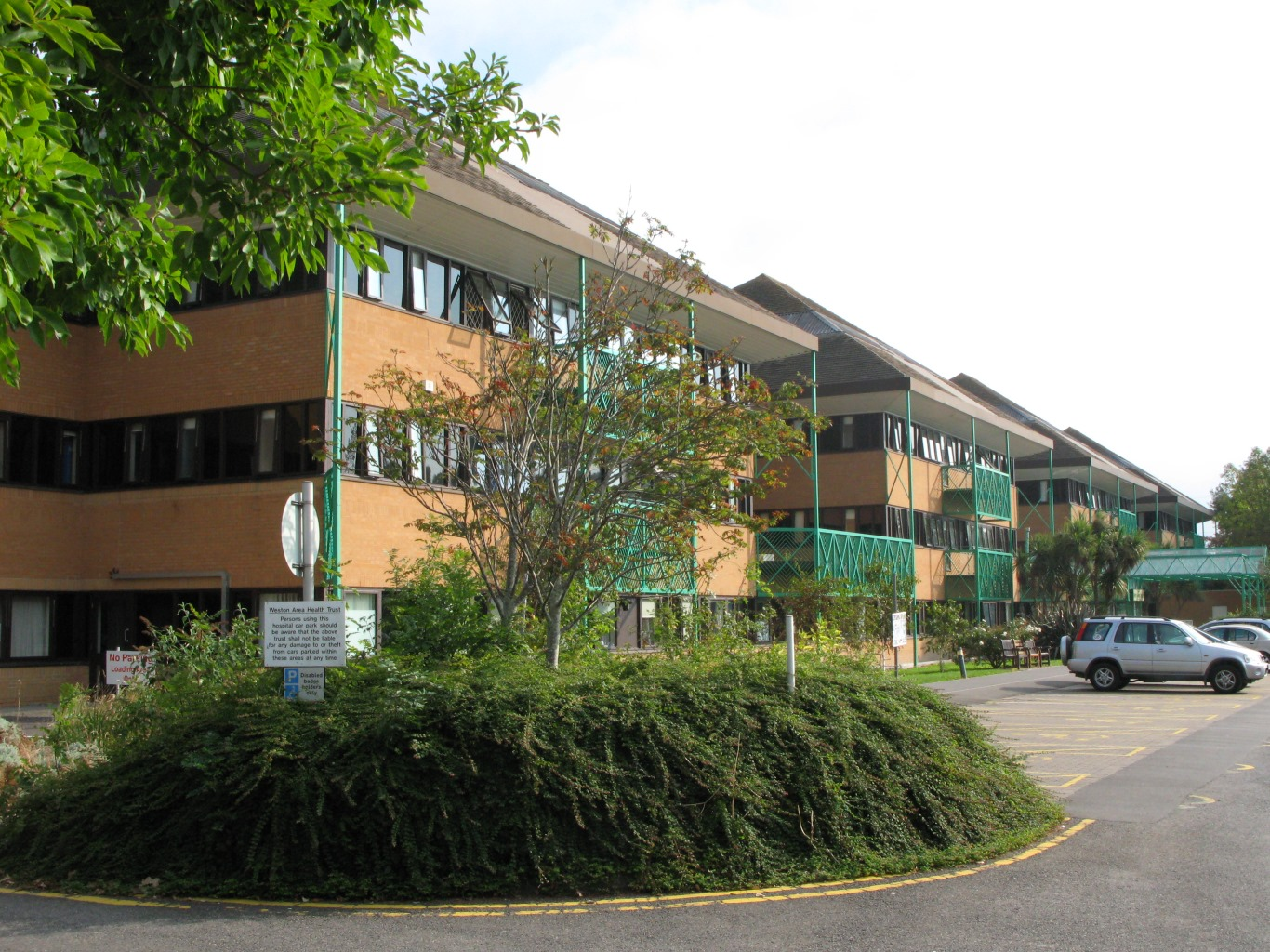
- Weston General Hospital

- Shown in Somerset

Geography
- Location: Weston-super-Mare, Somerset, England, United Kingdom
- Coordinates: 51°19′16″N 2°58′17″W

Organisation
- Care system: Public NHS
- Type: District General

Services
- Emergency department: Yes (Note: Since 4 July 2017, the hospital's emergency department closes every night between 22:00 and 08:00.)
- Beds: 261

History
- Founded: 1986

Links
- Website: www.waht.nhs.uk
- Lists: Hospitals in England

Weston General Hospital is an NHS district general hospital in the town of Weston-super-Mare, Somerset, England, operated by University Hospitals Bristol and Weston NHS Foundation Trust. As of June 2019, the hospital had 261 beds and around 1,800 clinical and non-clinical staff. It has a part-time Accident & Emergency department, an intensive care unit, an oncology and haematology day unit, and a day case unit. The hospital also has a 12-bed private unit, The Waterside Suite, wholly owned by the hospital trust, with profits being re-invested into the main hospital.

== History ==
The Duke and Duchess of York officially opened the Queen Alexandra Memorial Hospital on The Boulevard in 1928. Over the years, equipment was added and updated. Portable and temporary buildings were added to the hospital in an attempt to keep pace with the growing needs of the community.

With the growth in the town of Weston, and in particular around the area of Worle, it became evident that the town needed a new hospital. Much debate took place resulting in a new hospital being built and opened on 16 September 1986, on the edge of Uphill village.

In January 2003, the hospital opened a new oncology and haematology day unit, the Jackson Barstow Wing. Thus patients could receive treatments, including chemotherapy and blood transfusions without having to travel to Bristol.

Weston General Hospital opened a new paediatric unit, the Seashore Centre, in February 2007. The unit, which treats outpatients and has a ten-bed day ward, was needed because the only major children's facilities in the region are at Bristol Royal Hospital for Children and at Musgrove Park Hospital in Taunton.

On 25 May 2020, during the COVID-19 pandemic, the hospital stopped accepting new admissions after an outbreak in which 40% of the 60 staff and patients tested in one week were positive for the disease. This meant around 6% of the hospital staff were infected with the disease, but asymptomatic. A phased re-opening of the hospital to new admissions began on 10 June.

=== Merger ===
The trust announced in 2011 that it was not viable in its present form. Taunton and Somerset NHS Foundation Trust submitted a bid in 2014 to take it over, but this was rejected in October 2015 by the NHS Trust Development Authority. North Somerset clinical commissioning group (CCG) stated in 2017 that the hospital and Weston Area Health Trust should become "part of a larger organisation". In January 2018, it was announced that the Weston trust was to merge with University Hospitals Bristol NHS Foundation Trust, which runs eight hospitals in the nearby city of Bristol. On 1 April 2020, the merger was completed with the formation of the University Hospitals Bristol and Weston NHS Foundation Trust.

The A&E department was closed temporarily overnight from June 2017. In January 2019, the CCG agreed that this should be permanent, so that the A&E would be open between 8 am and 10 pm; and that emergency and complex surgery and critical care outside these hours should be transferred to the larger hospital trusts in Taunton and Bristol.

== Performance ==
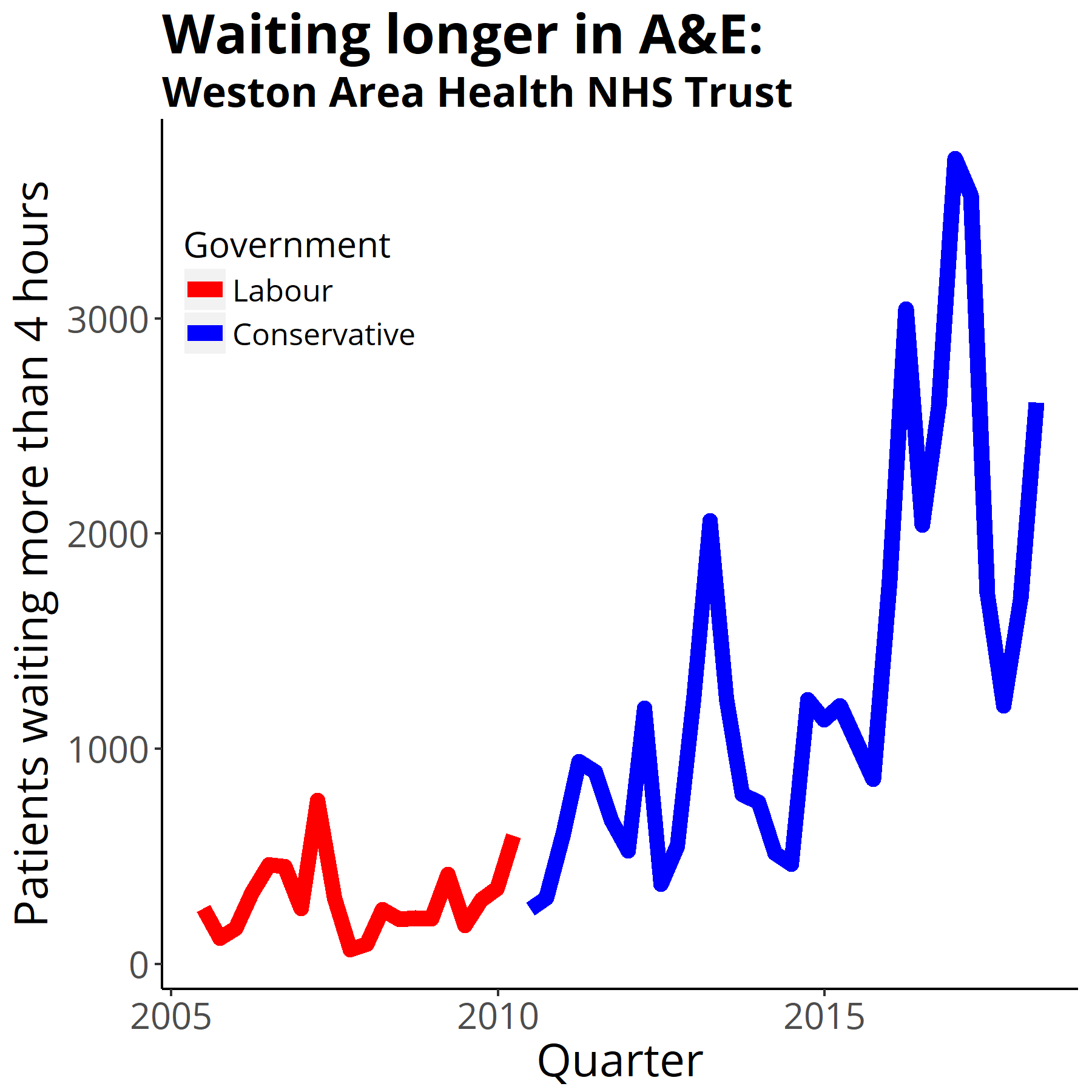
Failures against four-hour target in A&E. Quarterly figures from NHS England.

The Healthcare Commission and its successor the Care Quality Commission (CQC) have inspected Weston General Hospital and published their findings. In the 2005/2006 period, on the quality of the healthcare it provided, the hospital was rated as weak on a four-point scale of weak, fair, good and excellent. This placed the hospital in the bottom performing 9% of trusts in the country. On the same scale, the hospital's use of resources was also rated weak, placing it in the bottom 37% of trusts in the country. In the 2006/2007 period, the hospital's quality of healthcare score was upgraded to fair, but its use of resources rating remained at weak.

The hospital, like others, has had problems with hospital-acquired infections such as MRSA and Clostridioides difficile (C. diff). In 2003, the trust had the highest rate of MRSA infections in the country. In August 2007, the hospital was criticised in the local press following the death of a 75-year-old cancer patient from C. diff. Responding, the hospital stated that it had reduced infection rates by 25% through 2007. Performance figures released by the trust in September 2007 showed that hospital-acquired infection rates had fallen further, with just one case of MRSA in August and 18 of C. diff, compared with more than 30 just a few months previous. These improvements were attributed to a new "bare below the elbow" initiative to ensure that staff clean their hands and wrists, plus regular steam cleaning of patient beds.

On 7 July 2003, BBC Television programme Inside Out broadcast allegations from a whistleblower that senior management within the hospital were putting pressure on employees to manipulate waiting list statistics to make them look more favourable. An independent enquiry in 2004 concluded that this manipulation did take place. In 2006, one of the managers named by Inside Out lost a libel case against the BBC, which had alleged that she was involved in the falsification of waiting lists. Waiting list issues continued, and in 2006 the hospital was one of only eight in the country that failed to reduce waiting times for treatment.

The trust was forced to borrow £7.7 million in June 2016 because it was having trouble retaining clinicians.

Since June 2017, the trust has been forced to close the hospital's emergency department overnight after warnings from the CQC that it was overcrowded, understaffed and unsafe, and relying on locum staff.

In April 2021, Health Education England removed ten foundation year one doctors on placement in the hospital. It was said: "The working conditions for medicine trainees at Weston General Hospital were unacceptable, with junior medical staff frequently left without adequate senior supervision and support on understaffed wards. The trust was not meeting the standards we require."

== Voluntary organisations ==
The hospital is served by a number of voluntary organisations including an active League of Friends whose volunteers staff the hospital shop and raise money for projects within the hospital; Freewheelers EVS, who use motorcycles to provide emergency out-of-hours transport of blood, diagnostic specimens and drugs; and Sunshine Radio, a hospital radio station manned by volunteers. The hospital also works closely with nearby Weston Hospicecare which provides palliative care for patients with life-threatening conditions such as cancer. The new children's centre was partly funded by an appeal, Weston Super Kids, backed by many in the town including the mayor, who made it her chosen charity in 2006 for her year in office.

== See also ==
- Healthcare in Somerset
- List of hospitals in England
