= Bristol General Hospital =

Hospital in Bristol, England

- University Hospitals Bristol NHS Foundation Trust
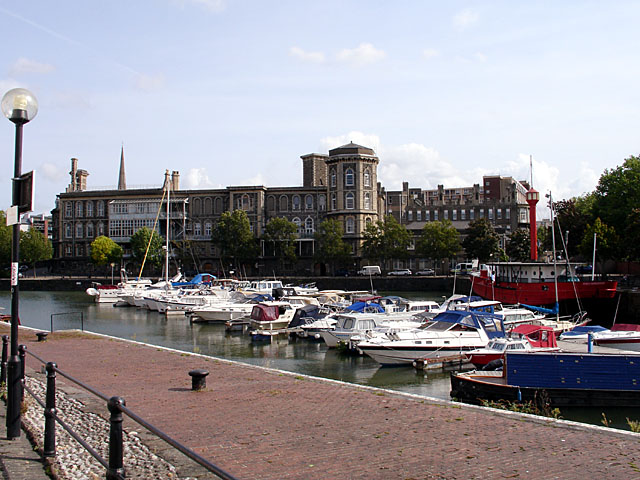
- Western view of the hospital

- Shown in Bristol

Geography
- Location: Bristol, England, United Kingdom
- Coordinates: 51.4465°N 2.5928°W

Organisation
- Care system: Public NHS
- Type: District General

Services
- Emergency department: No Accident & Emergency
- Beds: 77

History
- Founded: 1832
- Closed: 4 April 2012

Links
- Website: Trust page on United Hospitals Bristol site
- Lists: Hospitals in England

Bristol General Hospital (sometimes referred to as BGH or Bristol General) was a healthcare facility in Guinea Street, Harbourside, Bristol, in the south west of England. It opened in 1832 and closed in 2012. The BGH was managed by the University Hospitals Bristol NHS Foundation Trust. The building has since been converted into apartments.

== History ==
The hospital has its origins in a small house in Guinea Street where it was established with 20 beds in 1832, primarily with support of Quakers. Construction of purpose-built facility, at a site previously occupied by Bathurst Ironworks and designed by William Bruce Gingell, was undertaken between 1852 and 1856. An extension was opened by the Duke of Edinburgh in 1891. The nurses accommodation, designed by Henry Crisp and Sir George Oatley, was completed in 1895 and extended in 1907.

The King Edward VII Wing, a substantial additional clinical facility, followed in 1914, just before the start of the First World War. The ogee dome on the roof of the hospital was completely destroyed and the roof badly damaged during the Second World War.

Although for much of the post-war period the hospital continued to be one of the main providers of clinical services to the Bristol and North Somerset area, in later years it became a specialist rehabilitation hospital. In 2008, the hospital was used as the filming location for the BBC Three drama series Being Human, which was broadcast in early 2009.

After services moved to the Bristol Royal Infirmary and to the new South Bristol Community Hospital, the hospital closed on 4 April 2012. The site was subsequently acquired by City & Country, a property developer, who have restored the ogee dome on the roof of the hospital as part of works to convert the hospital into apartments.

== Archives ==
Records and plans of the Bristol General Hospital are held at Bristol Archives (Ref. 40530) (online catalogue) and (Ref. 44931) (online catalogue).

== See also ==
- List of hospitals in England
