= University of Bristol Dental Hospital =

- Bristol NHS Foundation Trust
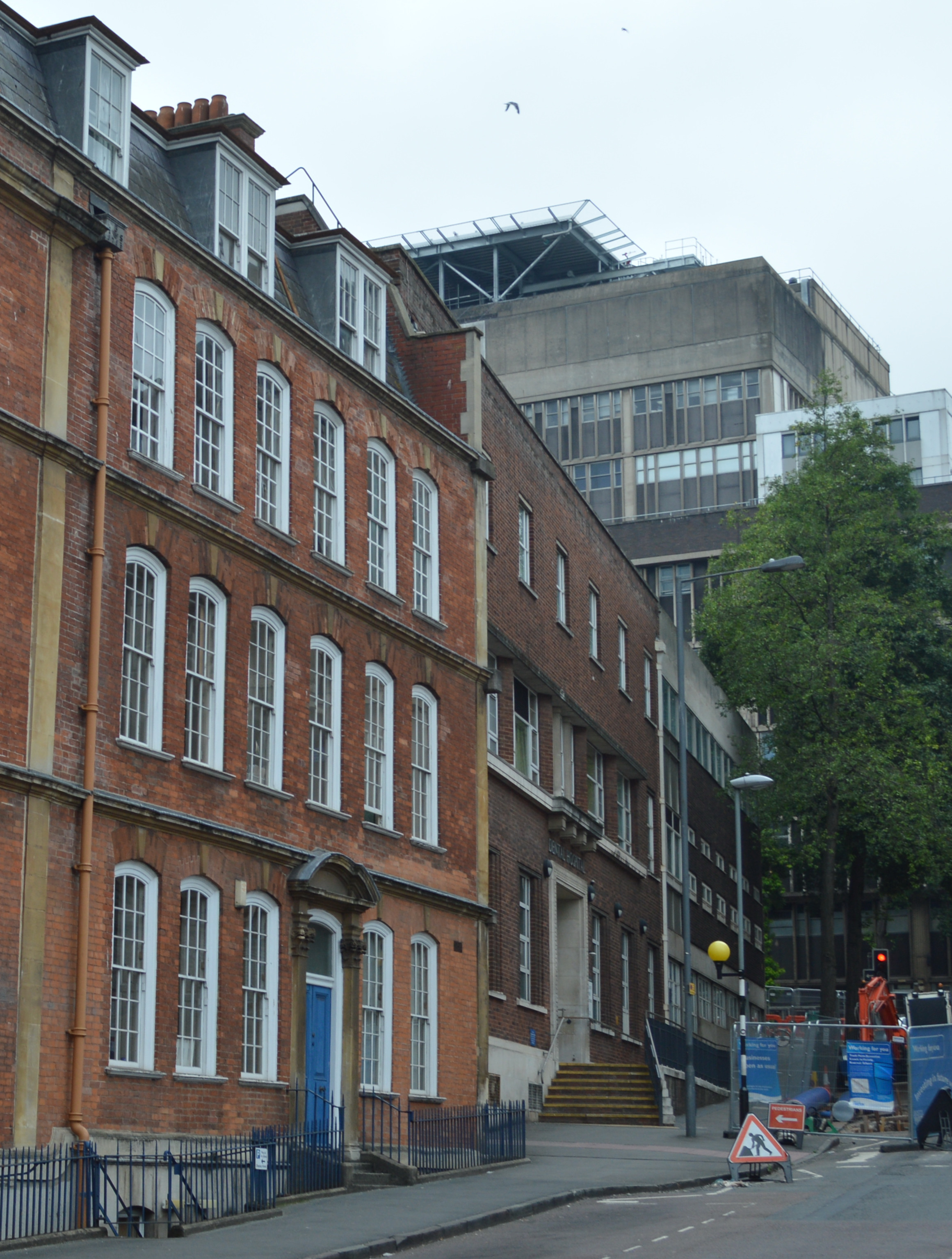
- University of Bristol Dental Hospital

- Shown in Bristol

Geography
- Location: Bristol, England
- Coordinates: 51.4586°N 2.5952°W

Organisation
- Care system: NHS
- Type: Teaching
- Affiliated university: University of Bristol, Faculty of Health and Social Care University of the West of England

Services
- Emergency department: Daytime
- Speciality: Dentistry

History
- Founded: 1935

Links
- Website: www.uhbristol.nhs.uk/patients-and-visitors/your-hospitals/university-of-bristol-dental-hospital/
- Lists: Hospitals in England

The University of Bristol Dental Hospital is a specialist hospital for dental treatment in Bristol, England. It operates in conjunction with the University of Bristol Dental School. The Bristol Eye Hospital is adjacent, and the Bristol Royal Infirmary nearby. It is managed by the University Hospitals Bristol and Weston NHS Foundation Trust.

== History ==
The hospital has its origins in the Dental Department of the Bristol Royal Infirmary which was established in 1883. The first dental degree was awarded to a student in 1912.

A site for a purpose-built dental hospital was selected in Lower Maudlin Street and construction started in 1935. The dental hospital and school opened in 1939 and was extended in 1965, 1973, 1985 and 1995. A major expansion and refurbishment was completed in 2009.
