= Southmead Hospital =

- Bristol NHS Foundation Trust
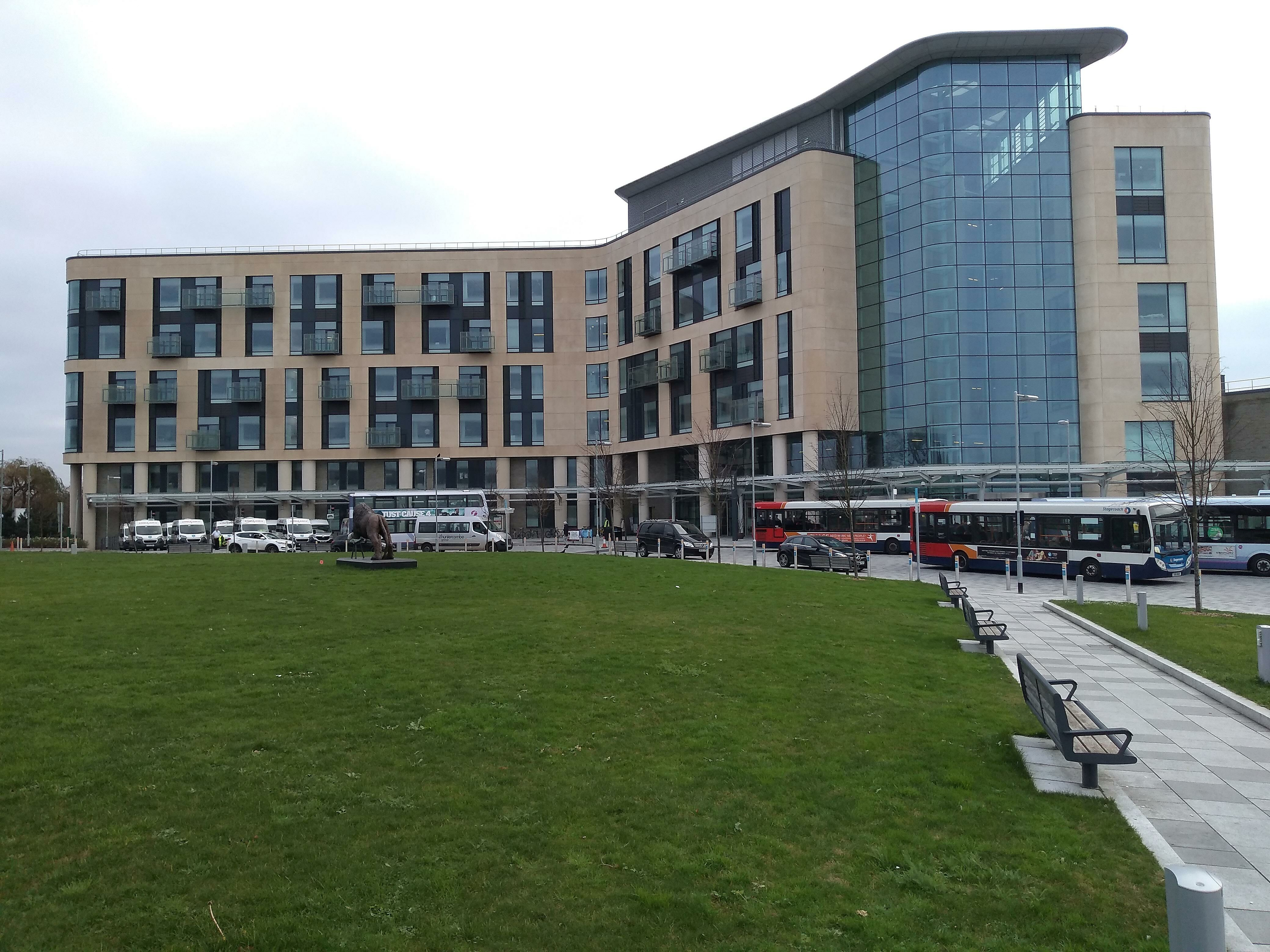
- North end of Brunel Building

- Shown in Bristol

Geography
- Location: Southmead, Bristol, England
- Coordinates: 51.4968°N 2.5916°W

Organisation
- Care system: NHS
- Type: District General hospital
- Affiliated university: University of Bristol; University of the West of England

Services
- Emergency department: Major Trauma Centre – Adults
- Beds: 996

Helipads
- Helipad: Yes

History
- Founded: 1902

Links
- Website: www.nbt.nhs.uk/our-hospitals/southmead-hospital
- Lists: Hospitals in England

Southmead Hospital is a large public National Health Service hospital, situated in the area of Southmead, though in Horfield ward, in the northern suburbs of Bristol, England. It is part of the North Bristol NHS Trust. The 800-bed Brunel Building opened in May 2014, to provide services (including Accident and Emergency), which transferred from Frenchay Hospital in advance of its closure. The hospital site covers 60 acres (24 ha).

== History ==
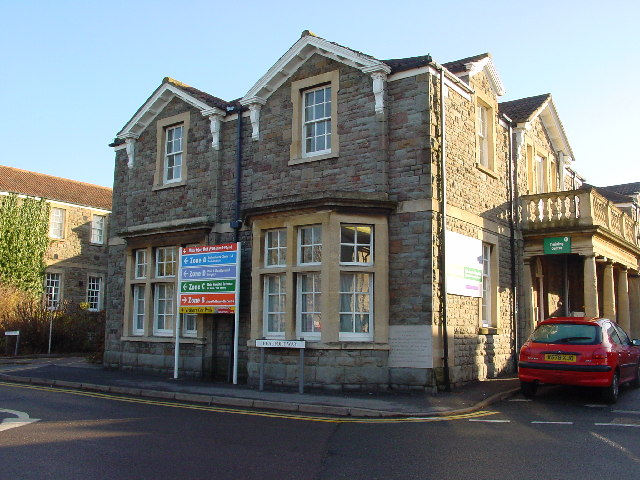
The original workhouse building now used as a training centre

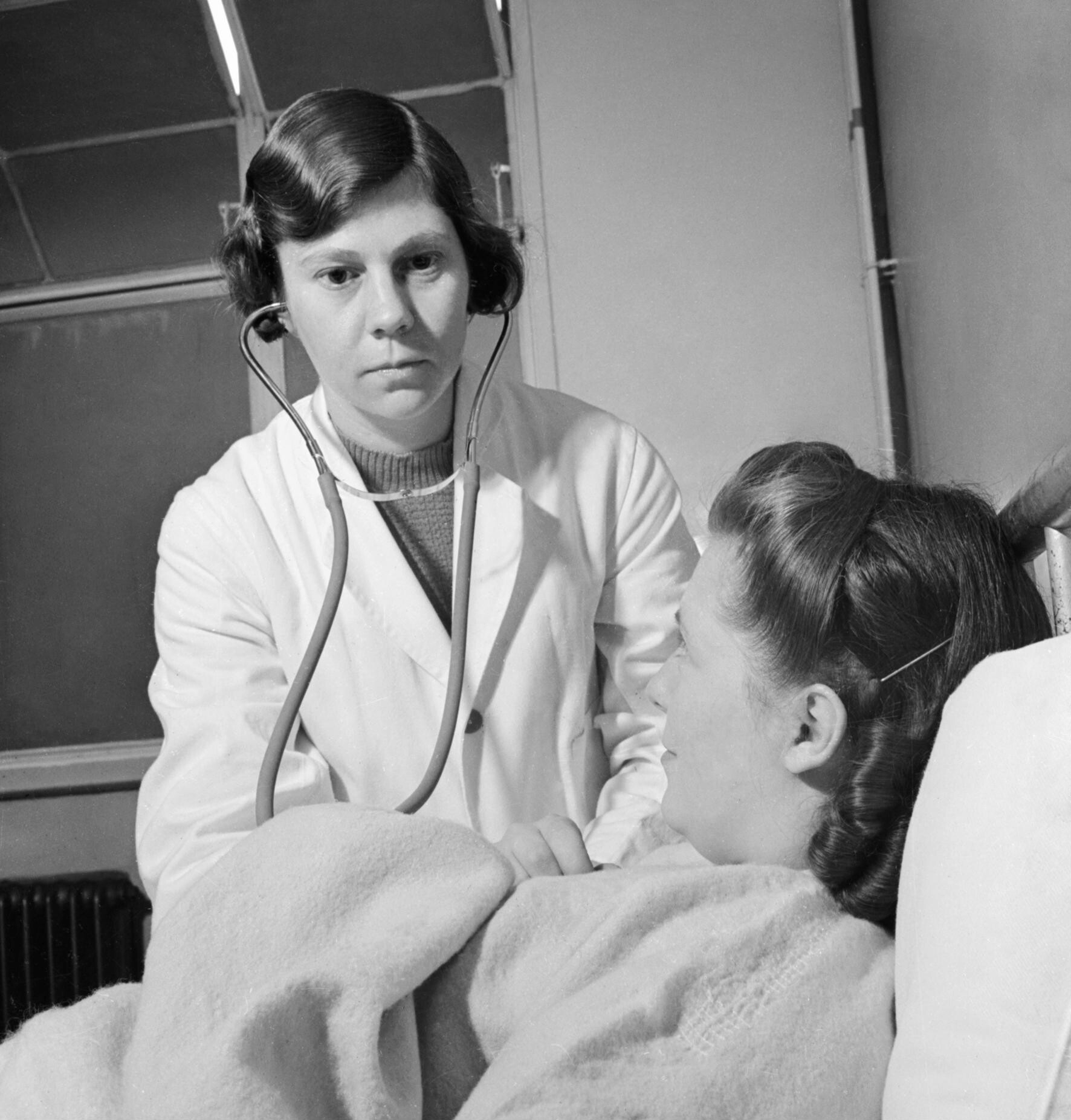
Dr Gibson-Hill examines a patient at Southmead Hospital in 1942

=== Early history ===
The hospital originated in 1902, when the Barton Regis Poor Law Union opened a new workhouse. The Barton Regis Union had been obliged to open a new workhouse when it lost its urban areas, and with them its workhouse at Eastville, to Bristol in 1897. An innovation in the new workhouse at Southmead was that in a separate building it included an infirmary, with 28 beds for the sick and provision for three nurses.

By 1911, there were 520 beds. During the First World War, the Memorial Wing at Bristol Royal Infirmary together with Southmead Hospital were requisitioned by the War Office to create the 2nd Southern General Hospital, a facility for the Royal Army Medical Corps to treat military casualties. The facilities reverted to a workhouse in the early 1920s and were then greatly extended to accommodate all the sick. In 1924, the Southmead Infirmary was built and was later renamed Southmead Hospital.

Notable former medical staff include Grace M Westbrook, matron from 1958, who was the first practising nurse to be elected chair of the Staff Side of the Nurses and Midwives Whitley Council, and Geoffrey Tovey, serologist and founder of the UK Transplant Service, which was formed in 1972 and was initially based at the hospital.

=== Brunel building ===
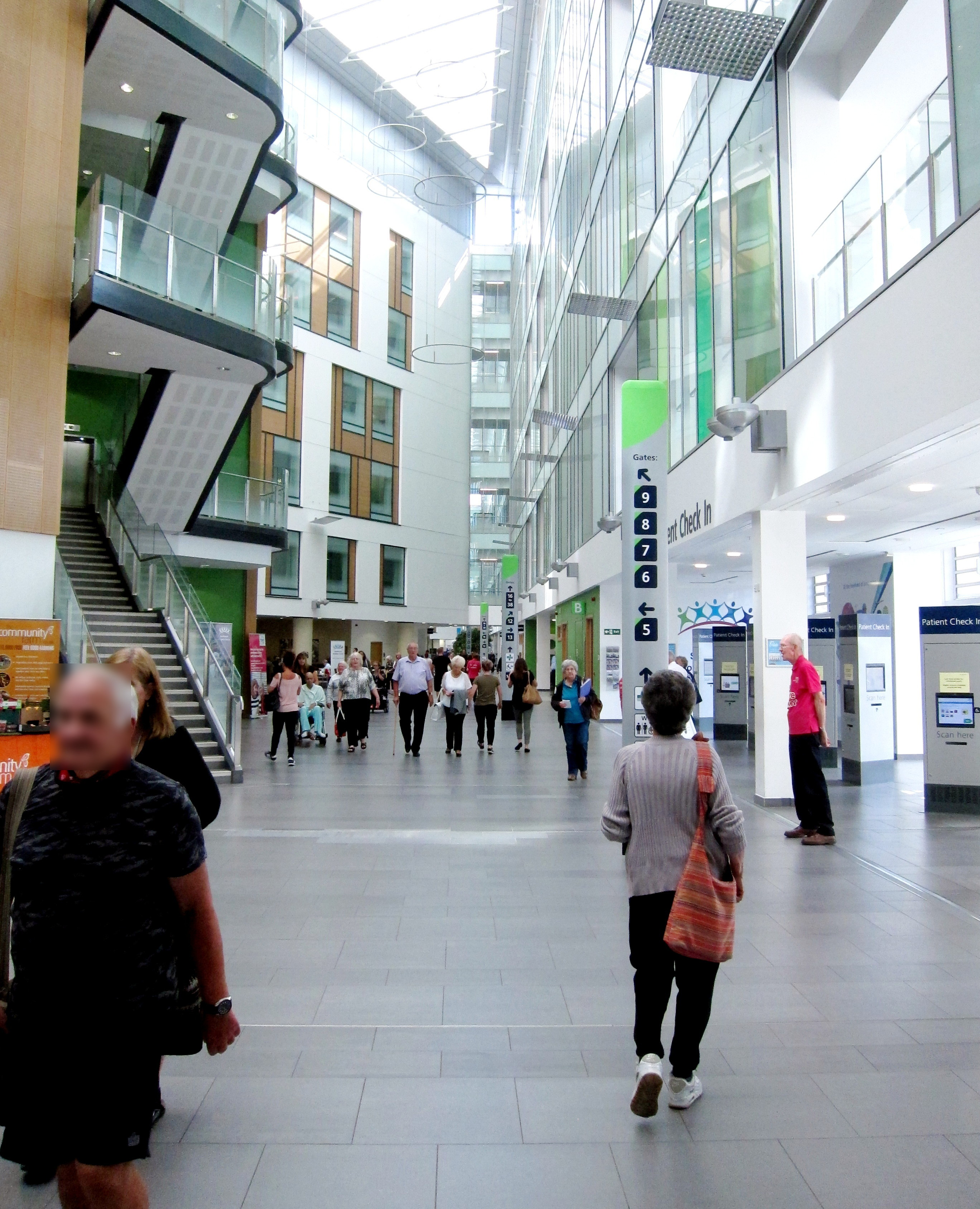
The atrium in the main hospital building (Brunel) gives access to reception, outpatient departments, coffee shops, and a small supermarket

In 2005, a major expansion was planned which included moving most services from Frenchay Hospital to the Southmead site, with Frenchay being downgraded to a Community Hospital. Full approval for the project was given by the NHS South West board in January 2009. A new building, which was designed by the Building Design Partnership and built by Carillion at a cost of £430 million, was procured under a Private Finance Initiative contract in 2010. The scheme brought all departments and services together under one roof. Called the Brunel building, it would have 800 beds, 24 operating theatres, patient gardens, a public square, a helipad and visitors' multi-storey car park. In 2013, ahead of the opening of the expanded hospital, a public poll was held on whether to keep the hospital's name as Southmead Hospital or to change it; the outcome was to keep the original name. Another proposed name, Bristol Brunel, named after Bristol engineer Isambard Kingdom Brunel, was subsequently given to the new main building, which became the Brunel Building.

The accident and emergency department at Frenchay closed on 19 May 2014 and reopened at Southmead the next day.

In early 2014, the second phase of the hospital redevelopment began with the demolition of the old main building to enable construction work to begin on a Brunel Building extension, together with enlarging the area in front of the hospital. The extension includes a new multi-storey car park for patients and visitors, a cycle centre with storage for 300 bikes, more shops, changing and shower facilities for staff and a community arts space.

Following the 2014 opening of the Brunel building, there was a shortage of parking spaces owing to high demands from visitors, patients, and staff. In 2014 and 2015, patients and visitors parked at the nearby Beaufort Way multi-storey car park. Improvements were made in 2016, including the construction of a 400-space multi-storey car park next to the Brunel building.

=== Recent history ===
In June 2024, Anne, Princess Royal was admitted to Southmead Hospital after sustaining concussion and minor head injuries on her Gloucestershire estate, believed to have been caused by a horse. She was discharged three days later.

== Facilities and services ==
Southmead Hospital contains one of two adult Major Trauma Centres for South West England, providing specialist care and treatment for major trauma as part of the Severn Major Trauma Network. The Network covers the former Avon county area as well as parts of Gloucestershire, Somerset and Wiltshire.

== Archives ==
Records relating to hospitals within the Southmead Health Authority are held at Bristol Archives (Ref. 39880).

== See also ==
- Healthcare in Bristol
- Bristol Royal Hospital for Children
- List of hospitals in England
