= Frenchay Hospital =

Hospital in South Gloucestershire, England

- North Bristol NHS Trust
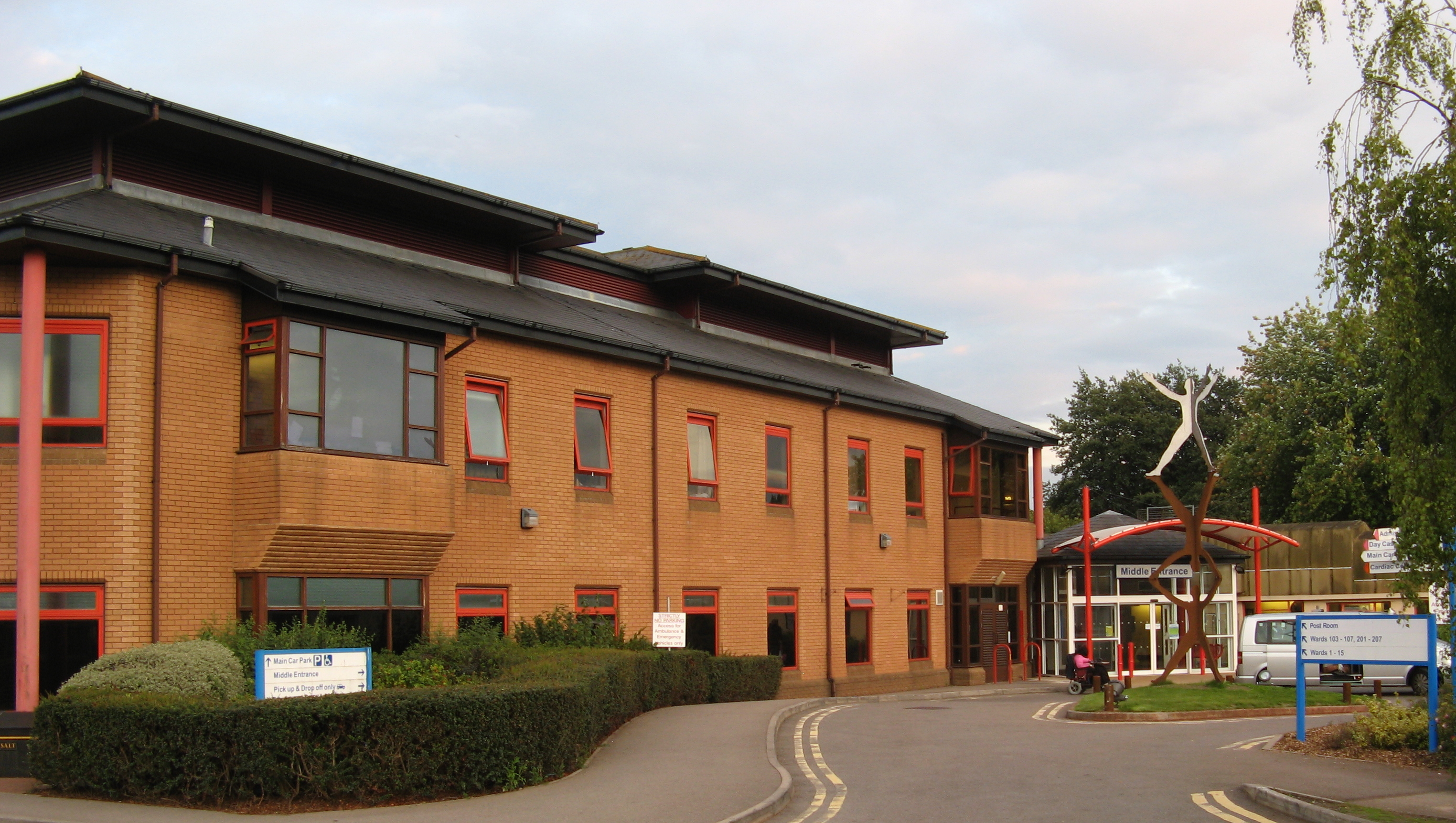
- Frenchay Hospital, middle entrance

- Shown in Gloucestershire

Geography
- Location: Frenchay, South Gloucestershire, England, United Kingdom
- Coordinates: 51.4977°N 2.5249°W

Organisation
- Care system: Public NHS
- Type: District General
- Affiliated university: University of Bristol, Faculty of Health and Social Care University of West of England

History
- Founded: 1921
- Closed: May 2014

Links
- Website: www.nbt.nhs.uk/our-hospitals/frenchay-hospital
- Lists: Hospitals in England

Frenchay Hospital was a large hospital in Frenchay, South Gloucestershire, on the north east outskirts of Bristol, England, which closed in 2014. It was managed by North Bristol NHS Trust.

From April to December 2014, most of Frenchay Hospital was progressively closed, with the majority of services moving to a new building at Southmead Hospital. Accident and Emergency was transferred on 19 May 2014. Child services moved to the Bristol Royal Hospital for Children. Services relating to brain and head injuries remained at the site and later moved into a newly built clinic.

== History ==
=== Early history ===
The hospital, situated in the grounds of a Georgian mansion, Frenchay Park, started life as a tuberculosis hospital (Frenchay Park Sanatorium) in 1921, when Bristol Corporation acquired the land. In 1931, five purpose-built buildings were constructed to extend the hospital beyond the original house.

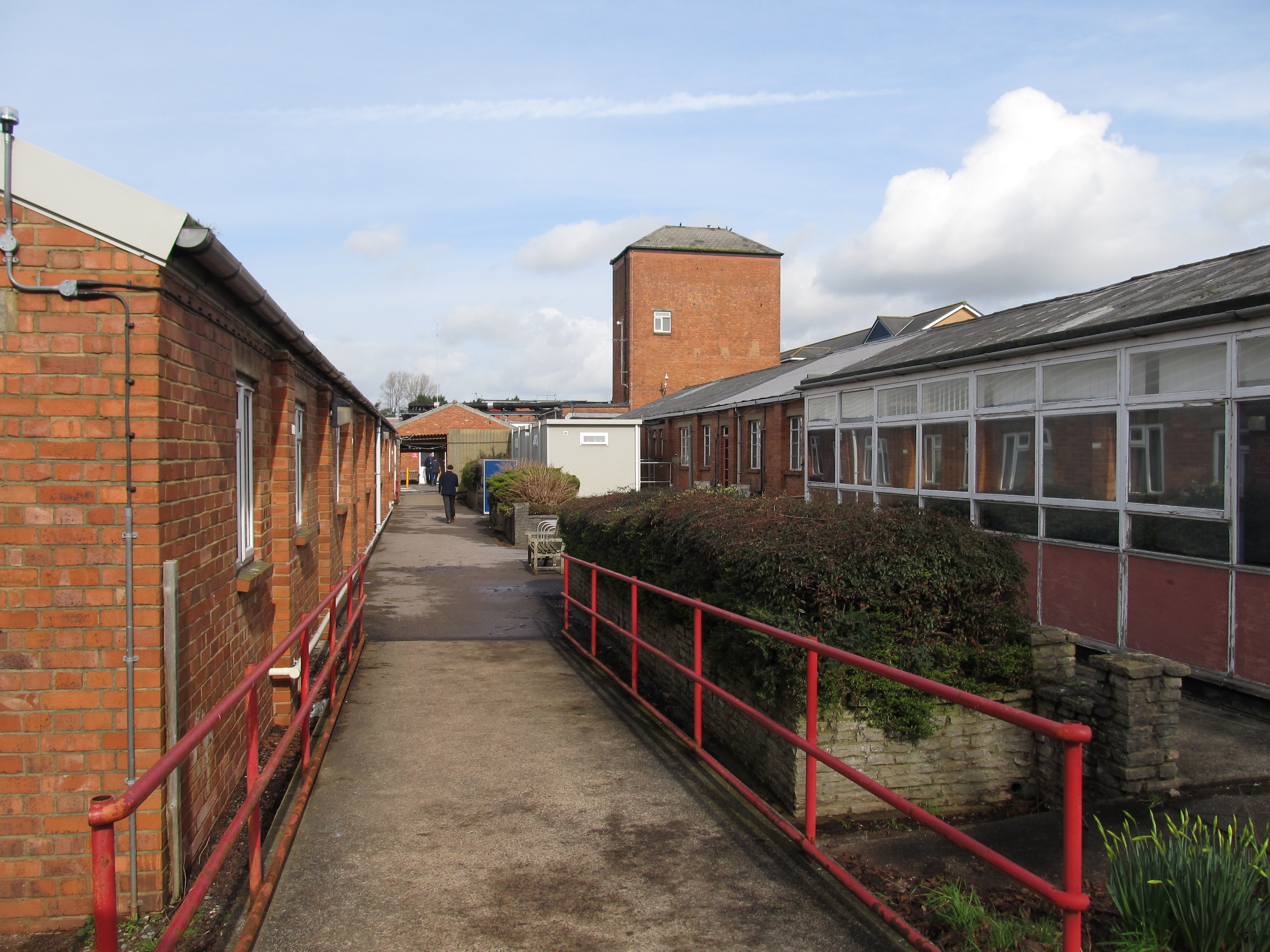
Modernised World War II wards in 2014

Concerns about the possibility of heavy bombing casualties led to the hospital being greatly expanded between 1938 and early 1942. Although Bristol was severely bombed, the new facilities remained unused.

When US forces arrived in 1942, the city handed the new hospital facilities over to the Americans, as a sort of reverse Lend-Lease. The initial units of the Medical Corps were the 2nd and 77th Evacuation Hospitals and the 152nd Station Hospital. Further expansion to the facilities including 27 wards, occurred in late 1942 and it was occupied by the 298th General Hospital. Initially, the Americans used the hospital mainly as training facility for their medical staff. After D-Day, however, the hospital was used in earnest, under the control of the 100th and then 117th General Hospitals. Casualties were flown into Filton or arrived by train from the channel ports. Between 5 August and 31 December 1944 a total of 4,954 patients were discharged from Frenchay.

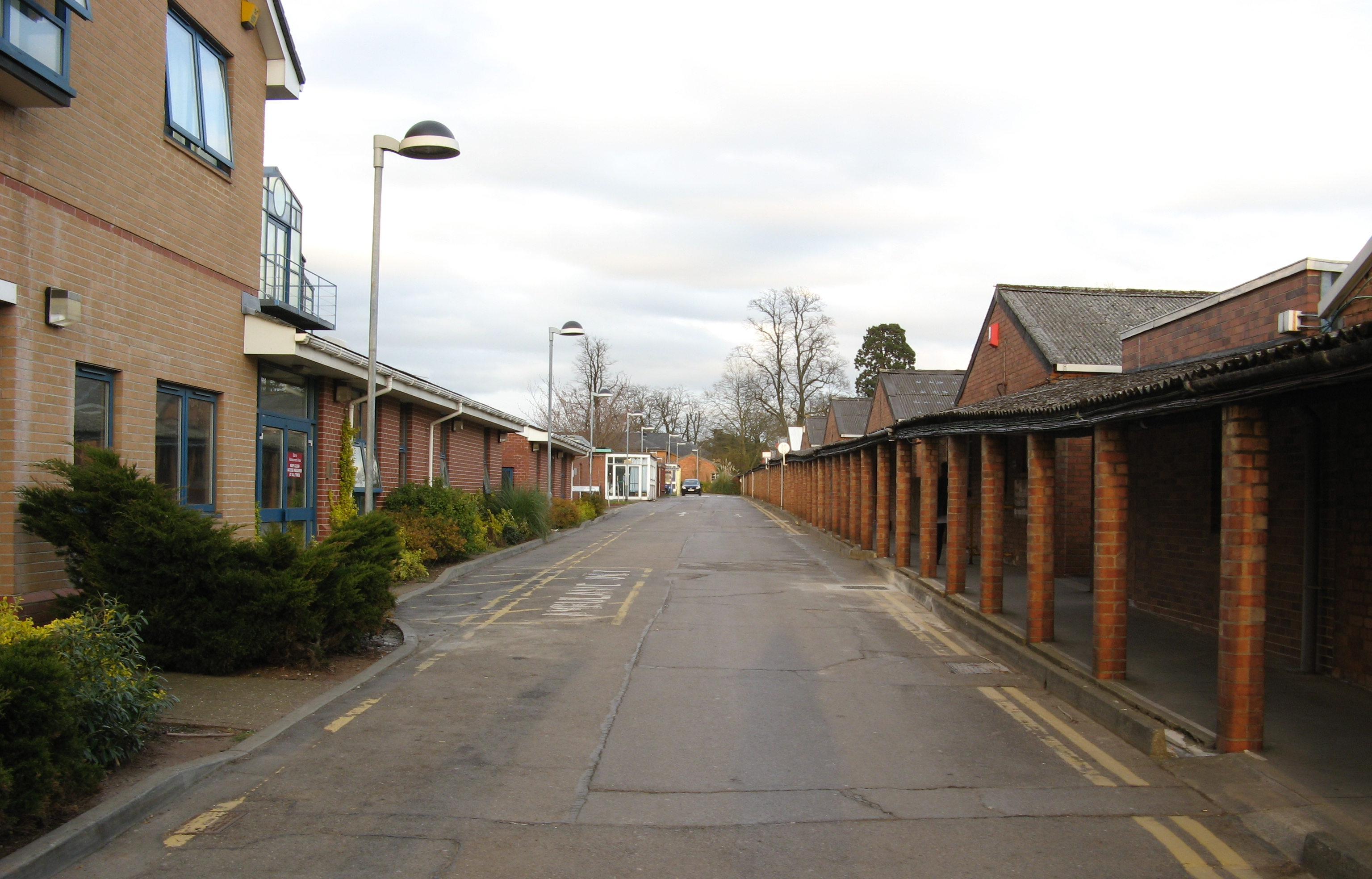
New and Second World War buildings in 2009

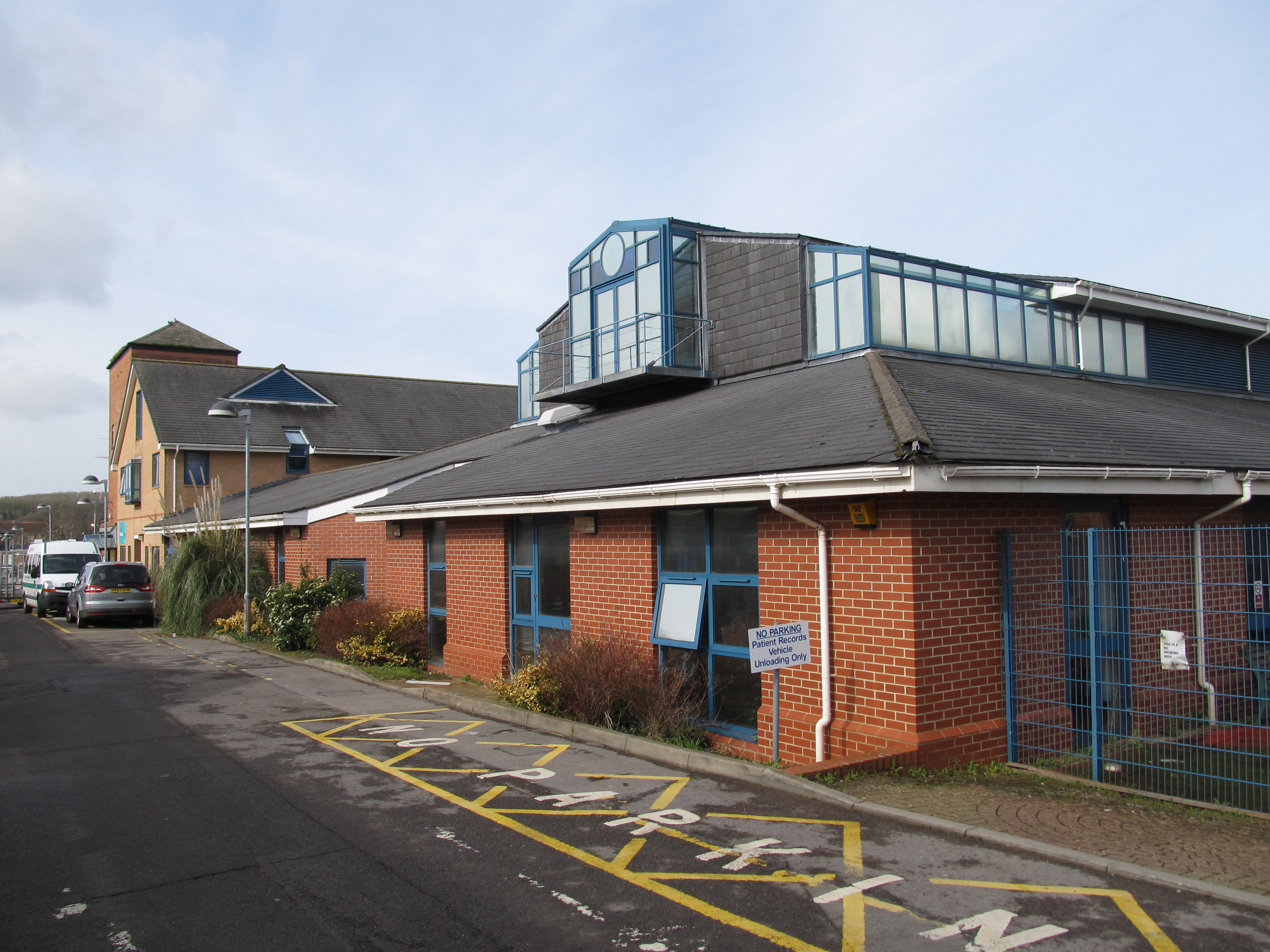
Barabara Russell Children's Unit just before closure

After the Second World War, the Americans handed the hospital back to the corporation. The hospital joined the National Health Service in 1948. In 1953, patients and the staff were visited by Frank Sinatra when he was appearing at the local Bristol Hippodrome.

=== Redevelopment ===
Over the second half of the 20th century, the hospital facilities were slowly modernised, but some wartime buildings were retained. In 2000, a new children's ward, The Barbara Russell Children's Unit, was opened after public fundraising toward the £4 million cost.

Frenchay Hospital was downsized after many services were transferred to Southmead Hospital in spring 2014. The hospital had extensive grounds some of which were marketed for sale. A Save Frenchay Hospital campaign was fronted by Steve Webb, the local Member of Parliament. The campaign's main arguments were that Frenchay Hospital afforded greater possibility for expansion than the Southmead site and that emergency access was easier due to its proximity to the motorway.

An extension was built at the Bristol Royal Hospital for Children to accommodate child services which moved from Frenchay in March 2014, including neuroscience, scoliosis surgery, burns and plastic surgery, bringing all inpatient child services in Bristol to one location.

The accident and emergency department was transferred to the new Southmead Hospital on 19 May 2014, following local advertising of the change.

The Save Frenchay Hospital campaign group pressed for a community hospital to be opened on the site. In 2015, the site – which had extended to 63 acres (25 ha) – was reduced to 6 acres (2.4 ha) with the construction of 490 homes, a school and a clinic. The clinic, housed in the Beckspool Building, treats head injuries and has a brain injury rehabilitation centre.

== See also ==
- Bristol Royal Infirmary
- Healthcare in Bristol
- List of hospitals in England
