= North Bristol NHS Trust =

NHS Hospitals Trust in Bristol 1999–2026

Coordinates: 51.4984°N 2.5916°W

- Type: NHS trust
- Established: 18 March 1999; 27 years ago
- Disbanded: 1 July 2026
- Headquarters: Southmead Hospital, Westbury-on-Trym, Bristol
- Hospitals: Southmead Hospital; Bristol Centre for Enablement; Cossham Hospital
- Chair: Ingrid Barker
- Chief executive: Maria Kane
- Staff: 13,000
- Website: www.nbt.nhs.uk

North Bristol NHS Trust was a National Health Service trust that provided community healthcare and hospital services to Bristol, South Gloucestershire, and North Somerset, England. The trust employed over 13,000 staff and delivered healthcare through several medical institutions, including Southmead Hospital, Cossham Hospital, and the Bristol Centre for Enablement, as well as through various community-based clinics. In addition, medical teaching facilities are provided in association with the University of the West of England, Bristol University, and the University of Bath.

On the 1st of July 2026, the trust merged with University Hospitals Bristol and Weston NHS Foundation Trust to create Bristol NHS Foundation Trust.

== History ==
North Bristol NHS Trust was formed on 18 March 1999 after merging the former Southmead Health Services NHS Trust and Frenchay NHS Trust. The trust's headquarters were at Frenchay Hospital, moving to Southmead Hospital when Frenchay was closed in 2014.

In December 2023, it was announced that North Bristol NHS Trust and University Hospitals Bristol and Weston NHS Foundation Trust would be appointing a joint chief executive and joint chair. In July 2024, Maria Kane was named as the new joint chief executive, following Ingrid Barker being named as the joint chair in April 2024.

In March 2026, the trust announced plans to merge into University Hospitals Bristol and Weston NHS Foundation Trust to create Bristol NHS Foundation Trust. The two trusts officially merged on the 1st of July 2026

== Facilities and services ==
Until 2014, Frenchay had Accident and Emergency (A&E) facilities whilst Southmead had a Minor Injuries Unit (MIU). The trust decided in 2005 to centralise activities at Southmead, where there was more room for expansion. From April to December 2014, Frenchay Hospital was progressively closed, with the majority of services moving to a new building at Southmead. A&E was transferred on 19 May 2014. Services relating to brain and head injuries remained at Frenchay after the hospital closed. The first patients moved into the new Brunel building at Southmead in May 2014.

The trust ran inpatient geriatric services at Blackberry Hill Hospital until 2005, when it ceased activities at the site, transferring most services to Frenchay and Southmead, and eventually selling the trust's part of the site.

In August 2015, the trust announced that they were not bidding for the contract to continue providing the Children's Community Health Partnership services which they won in 2009, because of the "non-core nature of the service", a "lack of management capacity" and "financial pressure".

North Bristol was scheduled to be the first trust to go live with Lorenzo patient record systems, but as of November 2015 are experiencing problems in transitioning from the Cerner system.

=== Brunel Building, Southmead Hospital ===
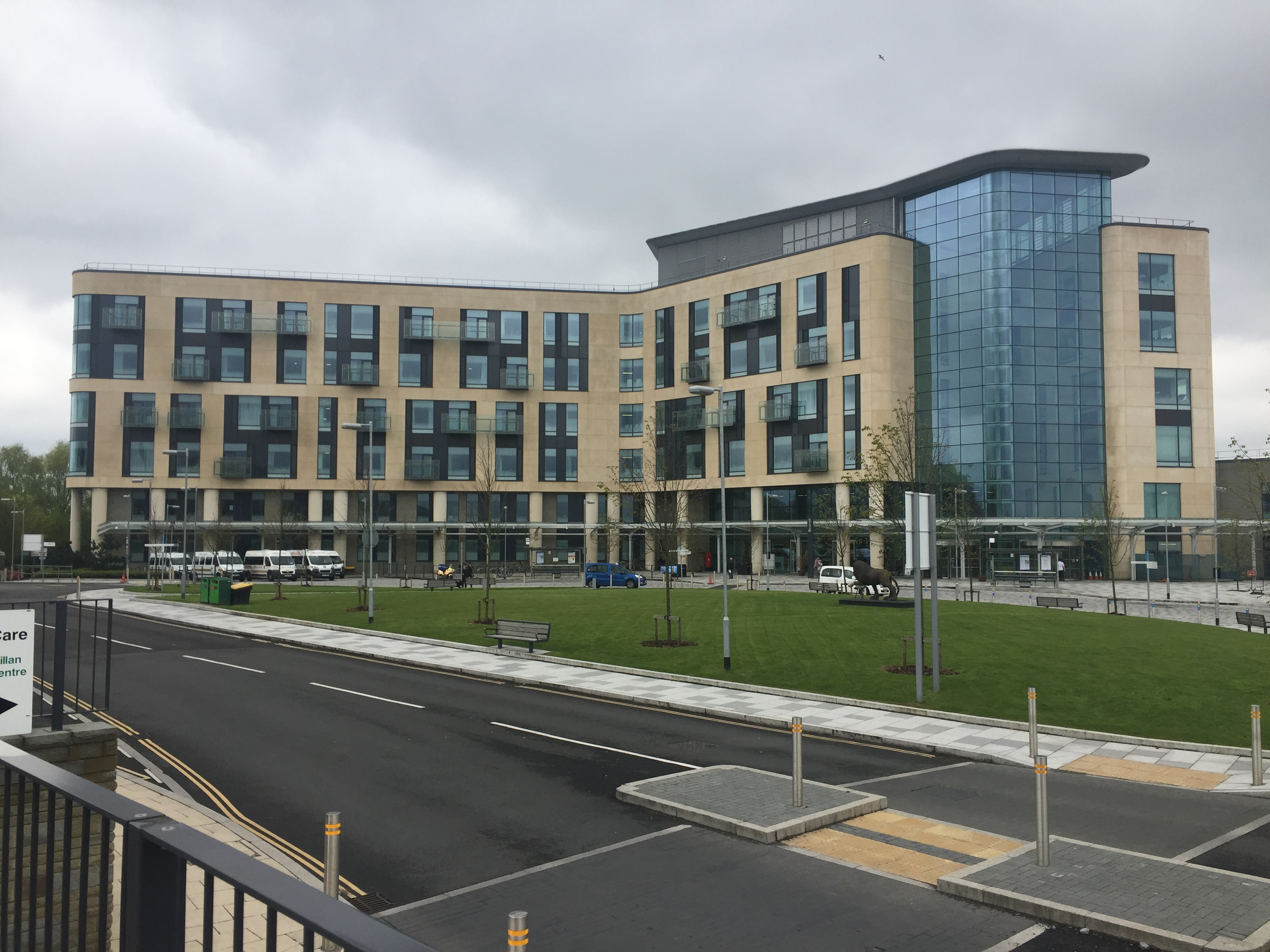
Brunel Building, showing main entrance

The trust opened the doors of its new building, Brunel, at Southmead Hospital, in 2014. At the heart of the 800-bed hospital is a public concourse which simplifies access to the medical wards and departments. The concourse, known as the 'atrium', is naturally lit and ventilated and provides cafes, winter gardens and artwork. Bedrooms have large areas of unobstructed glazing and are naturally ventilated, providing the patient with control of their own environment. The bedroom wings are on the eastern side, naturally shaded from the afternoon sun by the mechanically ventilated clinical block which houses 24 operating theatres, intra-operative MRI suite, 48 critical care bedrooms, advanced imaging suites, cardiac catheter labs and endoscopy unit. Of the 800 beds, 75% are single en-suite rooms, aiming to improve patient dignity and privacy.

The trust's Brunel Building has received two RIBA awards, an internationally-recognised mark of excellence awarded by the Royal Institute of British Architects. The building, designed by BDP architects, won RIBA South West Award 2018 for its architecture, as well as RIBA South West Client of the Year 2018.

The hospital recruited a group of volunteers, known as 'Move Makers', to aid the transition from the Frenchay site. The volunteers proved useful, so it was decided to keep them on indefinitely. In 2019, they were awarded the Queen's Award for Voluntary Service.

== Performance ==
Between July and September 2014, the trust had the third worst performance in the country against the requirement to treat and discharge or admit 95 per cent of A&E patients within four hours. It produced an operational resilience and capacity plan, envisaging the trust would achieve performance of 92 per cent against the A&E four-hour standard by April which was rejected. The biggest reason for avoidable breaches of the target was said to be the availability of suitable beds to admit patients. The trust had a deficit of £20.1 million at the end of August, £6.7M worse than planned. An unnamed whistleblower claimed a lack of beds was putting patient safety at risk because small rooms designed for minor procedures, such as injections, were being used to keep patients in overnight. The trust claimed these single rooms were entirely appropriate for safe and dignified patient care.

In February 2015, it was reported that the trust had 247 patients who had waited more than a year for elective treatment, 201 of them waiting for spinal surgery. It spent £20.8M, 7.1% of its total turnover, on agency staff in 2014–2015. In February 2016, it was expecting a deficit of £33.7M for the year 2015–2016.

It ended 2015–2016 in deficit of £51.6M.

In December 2017, the trust reported 122 breaches of the 12-hour target in A&E – the worst performance in England and only 70.3 per cent of patients were seen within the four-hour target. 122 people at Southmead Hospital were left on trolleys in corridors for more than 12 hours during December. In 2017-18, only 77.1% of A&E patients were seen within four hours.

PwC partnered with the trust to introduce Perform, a behavioural change methodology to reduce outliers, bed occupancy and rising demand. They deployed patient flow transformation discharge teams to help staff at all levels. The impact of the programme included releasing 50 beds, reducing length of stay by 13 per cent and enabling a 10.2 per cent increase in the four-hour performance. The trust received a HSJ Partnership Award in 2019 as a result of this programme.

The trust has welcomed many expansions and successes in clinical services. Neuromuscular services at the trust and University Hospitals Bristol and Weston NHS Foundation Trust have been recognised by Muscular Dystrophy UK for providing outstanding care for people with muscle-wasting conditions.

In September 2019, the trust was rated by the Care Quality Commission (CQC) as outstanding for caring, and good overall. The trust was also rated outstanding for well-led.

== Healthcare and clinical specialties ==
North Bristol NHS Trust, located in South West England, is distinguished as a Centre of Excellence for Health Care in a number of medical disciplines, and is one of the largest hospital trusts in the UK. The Trust has earned national and international recognition for its advances in treatments and medical care.

=== Neurosciences ===
The Institute of Neurosciences is located in the Brunel building at Southmead Hospital, the institute is the regional centre for neurological services serving the South West of England.

The service receives patient referrals from across the South West, throughout the UK, and worldwide. Using the latest techniques, the Neurosciences team treat a wide range of conditions. Some examples include the use of deep brain stimulation techniques for the treatment of functional disorders such as Parkinson's disease, led by Professor Gill, and developing the use of robotic surgery to deliver drugs directly into the brain.

In February 2019, a BBC documentary filmed over six years, The Parkinson's Drug Trial: A Miracle Cure followed a group of volunteers with Parkinson's disease as they take part in a groundbreaking medical trial. The trial was funded by Parkinson's UK with support from The Cure Parkinson's Trust and in association with the trust.

=== Orthopaedics ===
The Avon Orthopaedic Centre delivers such as hip and knee surgeries, carrying out 1,000 knee replacements a year.

=== Severn Major Trauma Network ===
The Severn Major Trauma Network was set up to manage and influence care for seriously injured patients from injury to rehabilitation. The network serves both adult, and children's major trauma. They have an adult population of around 2.3 million, and children's population of approximately 810,000.

== Overseas patients ==
The trust issued invoices to patients thought to be ineligible for NHS treatment totalling £1.2M in 2018–19, but only collected £0.2M.

== Working for the trust ==
The trust employs around 13,000 medical and non-medical professionals,supported by volunteers. It takes a progressive approach to staff wellbeing. The Wellbeing Programme is funded by their charity, Southmead Hospital Charity, and is made up of a range of physical, psychological and lifestyle support. This includes a free over-the-phone physiotherapy assessment service, bespoke psychological support sessions, Arts on Referral and the Mental Health First Aid network. Staff also have access to a 24/7 free, confidential helpline offering counselling about financial, legal, relationships and more, provided by partner organisation Health Assured. This programme was recognised by the NHS Parliamentary Awards in 2019.

=== Professional development and healthcare careers ===
Learning and development at the trust is based in the Learning and Research Centre at Southmead Hospital. The trust has links with University of the West of England and University of Bristol who support undergraduate and postgraduate education and work placements across many professions.

=== Nursing recruitment ===
Southmead Hospital is host to regular engagement days and study days. Nurses across the region are welcomed into the trust for professional development seminars, and clinical teams provide an insight into clinical developments, give attendees a chance to network with senior and staff nurses and access to complimentary CPD hours towards revalidation.

This continues on appointment to a role at the trust, as the trust offers a wide range of benefits. This includes bespoke rotations, wellbeing support, personalised travel plans, and a structured preceptorship.

== See also ==
- Healthcare in Bristol
- Healthcare in Somerset
- Healthcare in Gloucestershire
- List of NHS trusts
