= St Michael's Hospital, Bristol =

St Michael's Hospital
- Bristol NHS Foundation Trust
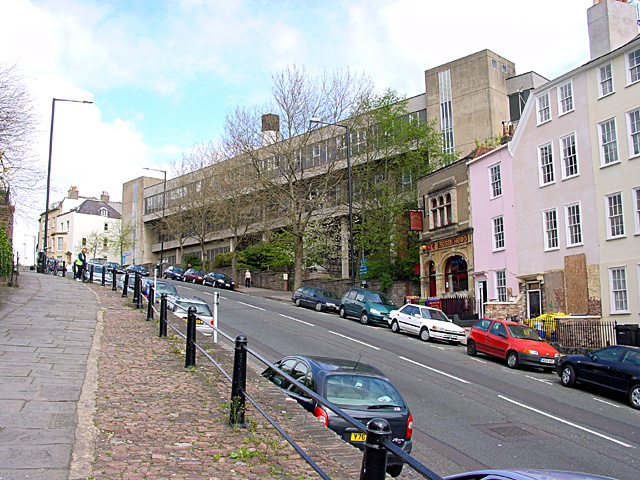
- Hospital from St Michael's Hill

- Shown in Bristol

Geography
- Location: Southwell Street, Bristol, BS2 8EG, Bristol, England, United Kingdom
- Coordinates: 51.4591°N 2.5994°W

Organisation
- Care system: Public NHS

Services
- Beds: 114

History
- Founded: 1975

Links
- Website: www.uhbristol.nhs.uk/patients-and-visitors/your-hospitals/st-michaels-hospital/
- Lists: Hospitals in England

St Michael's Hospital is a hospital in Bristol, England. Built in 1975, it provides maternity services for Bristol. The hospital is managed by University Hospitals Bristol and Weston NHS Foundation Trust.

== History ==
The hospital was established in 1865 at Alfred Place as the Temporary Home for Young Girls Who Have Gone Astray. It moved to Southwell Street in 1871, before briefly relocating to St Michael's Hill in the 1940s. It joined the National Health Service as the Bristol Lying-In Hospital in 1948, but then moved to Queen Victoria House on Durdham Down where Clementine Churchill conducted an official opening in November 1950. It returned to St Michael's Hill as the Bristol Maternity Hospital in 1975, and became known as St. Michael's Hospital in the 1980s.

On 22 May 2025, there was a partial evacuation of the building due to a fire on its roof. The hospital reopened some two hours later.

== Services ==
The hospital has a total of 114 beds. The midwifery staff provide choices to pregnant women, when deciding how best their pregnancy, labour and post-labour care is delivered. The hospital has a Neonatal Intensive Care Unit (NICU), which cares for sick and premature babies from across the South West region of England and South Wales. The hospital also provides gynaecology services. Other services such as ENT and Clinical Genetics are on the site. Patients coming to St Michael's are offered support from the chaplaincy team. There is a quiet room for use by all denominations. Services are almost entirely 24 hours. There is no A&E department.

== The Cots for Tots appeal ==
The Cots for Tots appeal was set up in 2010 by Wallace & Gromit's Grand Appeal, the Bristol Children's Hospital charity, to support St Michael's intensive care unit.

== See also ==
- Healthcare in Bristol
- List of hospitals in England
