= Geoffrey Tovey =

Geoffrey Harold Tovey (29 May 1916 – 19 December 2001) was a medical doctor whose scientific contributions in the field of haematology brought him an international reputation. He was also an expert in serology and founder and Director of the UK Transplant Service.

== Childhood and early life ==
Geoffrey Harold Tovey was born on 29 May 1916 at Midsomer Norton, Somerset, the middle of three children to Harold Tovey, a builder, and his wife Gerty. His mother died of acute pneumonia when Geoffrey was a child. After his mother's death, he attended Wycliffe College school, then the University of Bristol.

== Career ==
For a short while he worked as a GP in Bristol. He was then appointed House Physician at the Bristol Royal Infirmary, where he met his wife Margaret, a nurse. During the Second World War, he joined the Royal Army Medical Corps and was posted to the Army Blood Transfusion Service from 1941 to 1946, headed by haematologist Brigadier General L E H Whitby (from New Year 1945 as Brigadier General Sir Lionel Whitby) at Southmead Hospital, Bristol and helped in training RAMC privates at Clifton College as Blood Transfusion Orderlies (including J D R Thomas later famed for ion-selective electrodes that came to be used in blood electrolyte analysis – from 1994 Emeritus Professor of Chemistry at Cardiff University, whom Dr Tovey telephoned soon after being written to about his letter in The Daily Telegraph of 15 April 1998 on "New blood won't revive Service"); in 1945-46 Tovey had command of No.3 Base Transfusion Unit in Poona, India Command. After the war Dr Geoffrey Tovey returned to the Blood Transfusion Service unit in 1946 at Southmead Hospital, Bristol. In that year he was appointed Director of the South West Regional Blood Transfusion Service. It was in the evening of J D R Thomas's Cardiff marriage on 23 September 1950 that he went with his new wife Gwyneth from Bristol's Royal Hotel to the Reunion at Southmead Hospital of the wartime Blood Transfusion Unit, where they met several former colleagues who'd joined Dr Geoffrey Tovey's staff at the South West Regional Blood Transfusion Service. Dr Tovey held the post of Director from 1946 to 1978

Dr Tovey was one of the first surgeons regularly to perform intrauterine blood transfusions on unborn babies. In 1959 he advocated the induction of birth at 36 weeks pregnancy to prevent stillbirth in babies affected by Rhesus Haemolytic Disease; this subsequently saved many lives.

He performed early work on the typing of red cells and their antigens, white blood cells (Human Lymphocyte Antigens or HLAs), and the transfusion of platelets and later stem cells in the treatment of leukaemia.

He collaborated with transplant surgeons such as Christiaan Barnard, Michael De Bakey and Sir Roy Calne. He also appeared as an expert witness in a paternity case involving Cary Grant. He was also secretly consulted when the Shah of Iran was dying of leukaemia. He was appointed by the World Health Organization to advise countries around the world on the development of safe blood stocks. With the American firm Technicon, he helped to develop the first automated blood grouping machines.

In 1972 he founded and became the director of the UK Transplant Service. He was also president of the International Society of Blood Transfusion.

He was Consultant Adviser on Blood Transfusion at the Department of Health and Social Security from 1979 to 1981.

== Publications ==
He was the co-author of 70 papers between 1944 and 1978 and also published Techniques of fluid balance: Principles and management of water and electrolyte therapy (1957).

== Honours ==
Tovey was appointed CBE in 1977. Additionally, the Geoffrey Tovey Academic Centre at the University of Bristol commemorates him. Tovey served as President of the International Society of Blood Transfusion from 1973 to 1976.

== Personal life ==
Tovey married Margaret Davies in 1941. They had two sons, Charles and Stuart – Charles died in 1973, leaving behind a grandson, James, who regained contact with Geoffrey, Margaret and Stuart in 1994. As an enthusiastic genealogist in his spare time, Geoffrey traced his family history back to 1577; where records show a William Tovie as owner of The George Inn, Norton St Philip, Somerset, today claimed as one of the oldest public houses in the UK, first licensed to sell alcohol in 1397.
