= South Bristol Community Hospital =

- Bristol NHS Foundation Trust
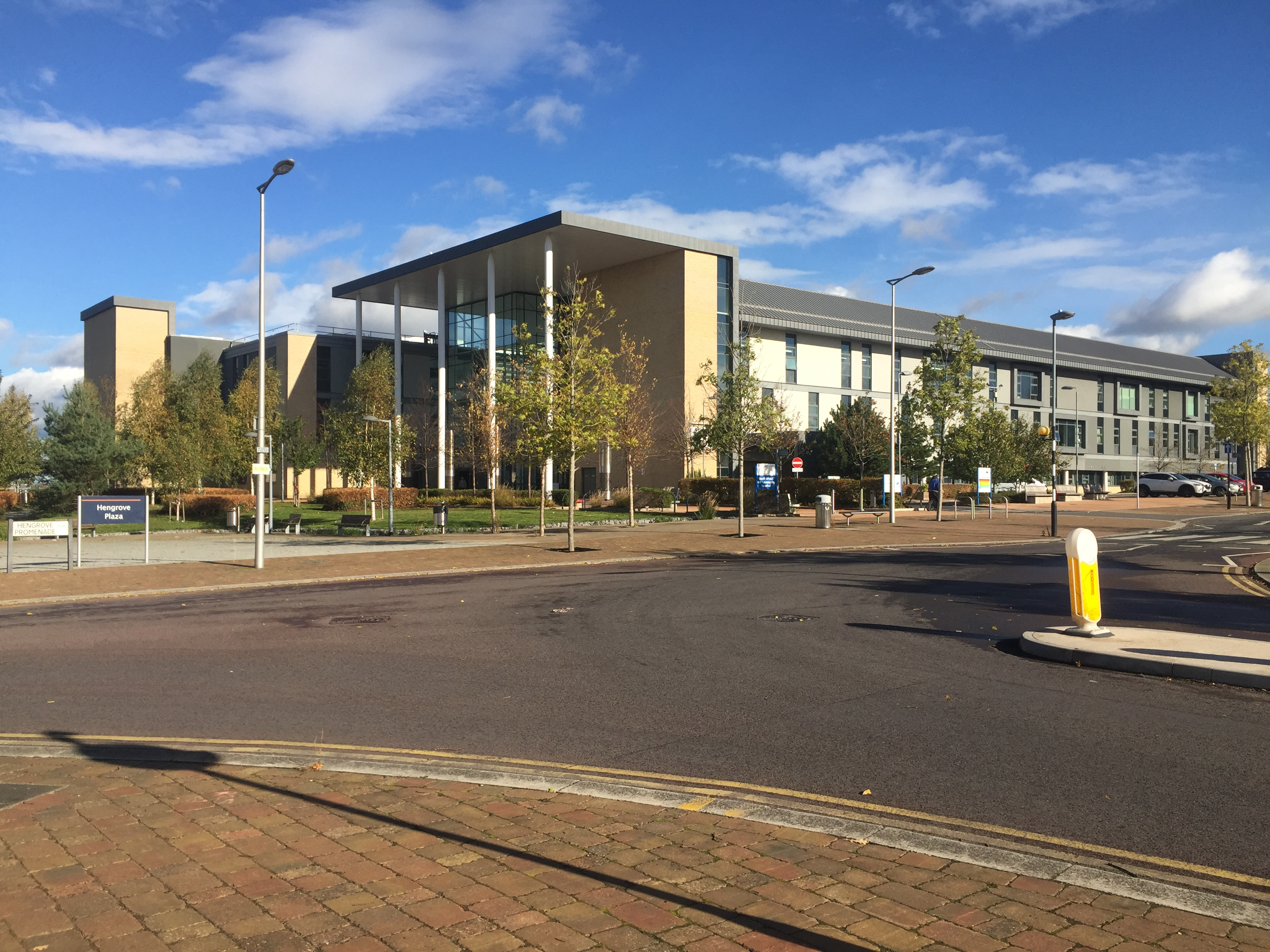
- The Hospital in 2018.

- Shown in Bristol

Geography
- Location: Hengrove Park, Bristol, England
- Coordinates: 51.4129°N 2.5863°W

Organisation
- Care system: NHS England
- Type: Community

Services
- Emergency department: No
- Beds: 60

History
- Founded: March 2012

Links
- Website: www.uhbristol.nhs.uk/patients-and-visitors/your-hospitals/south-bristol-community-hospital/

South Bristol Community Hospital is a community hospital in the Hengrove area of Bristol, England, on the site of the former Whitchurch Airport. It opened in March 2012. It is managed by the University Hospitals Bristol and Weston NHS Foundation Trust.

== History ==
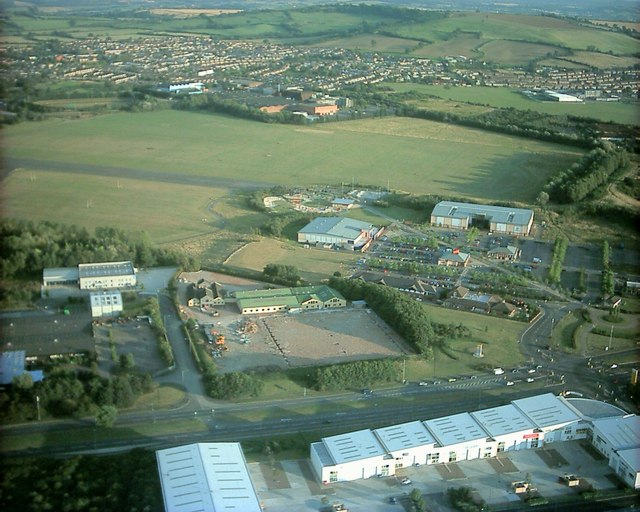
Hengrove Park, site of the hospital. The former runway can be seen left-centre

The hospital is a key part of the Hengrove Park Regeneration Project that will include a new Skills Academy, a sports and leisure centre, corporate headquarters and transport infrastructure improvements. There had been debate about a new hospital for South Bristol for a considerable time. The last plans by Bristol and Weston Health Authority were shelved in the late 1980s. The current development comes from plans instituted by Bristol Health Services Plan in 2000.

Planning permission for the hospital was granted in March 2008. The NHS South West board approved the £54 million facility in January 2009. The hospital was developed by NHS Bristol in conjunction with Bristol Infracare LIFT Ltd, a public-private partnership setup to provide new healthcare facilities in Bristol. Final go ahead was given in early 2010. The ground-cutting ceremony was held on 5 March 2010. Construction, which cost £45 million, was completed in the spring of 2012, although not all services were operating in March 2012.

The hospital provides a minor injuries unit, an out-of-hours GP service, day surgery facilities, stroke rehabilitation, medical imaging and dental facilities. It replaces outdated facilities at Bristol General Hospital.

On 7 January 2013, the Bristol Homeopathic Hospital moved its operations from Cotham House to the hospital, but homeopathy services ceased in October 2015, when the Portland Centre took over the service. In September 2018 CCGs in the area decided to cease funding homeopathy.

== See also ==
- List of hospitals in England
