= Bristol NHS Foundation Trust =

- Type: NHS trust
- Established: 1 July 2026
- Headquarters: Bristol, England
- Hospitals: Bristol Eye Hospital; Bristol Royal Hospital for Children; Bristol Royal Infirmary; Cossham Hospital; South Bristol Community Hospital; Southmead Hospital; St Michael's Hospital; University of Bristol Dental Hospital; Weston General Hospital
- Staff: 28,000
- Website: www.bristolft.nhs.uk

Bristol NHS Foundation Trust is an NHS foundation trust which serves Bristol and surrounding areas of South West England.

== History ==
The trust was formed on 1 July 2026 following the merger of North Bristol NHS Trust and University Hospitals Bristol and Weston NHS Foundation Trust.
