= Bristol Eye Hospital =

- Bristol NHS Foundation Trust
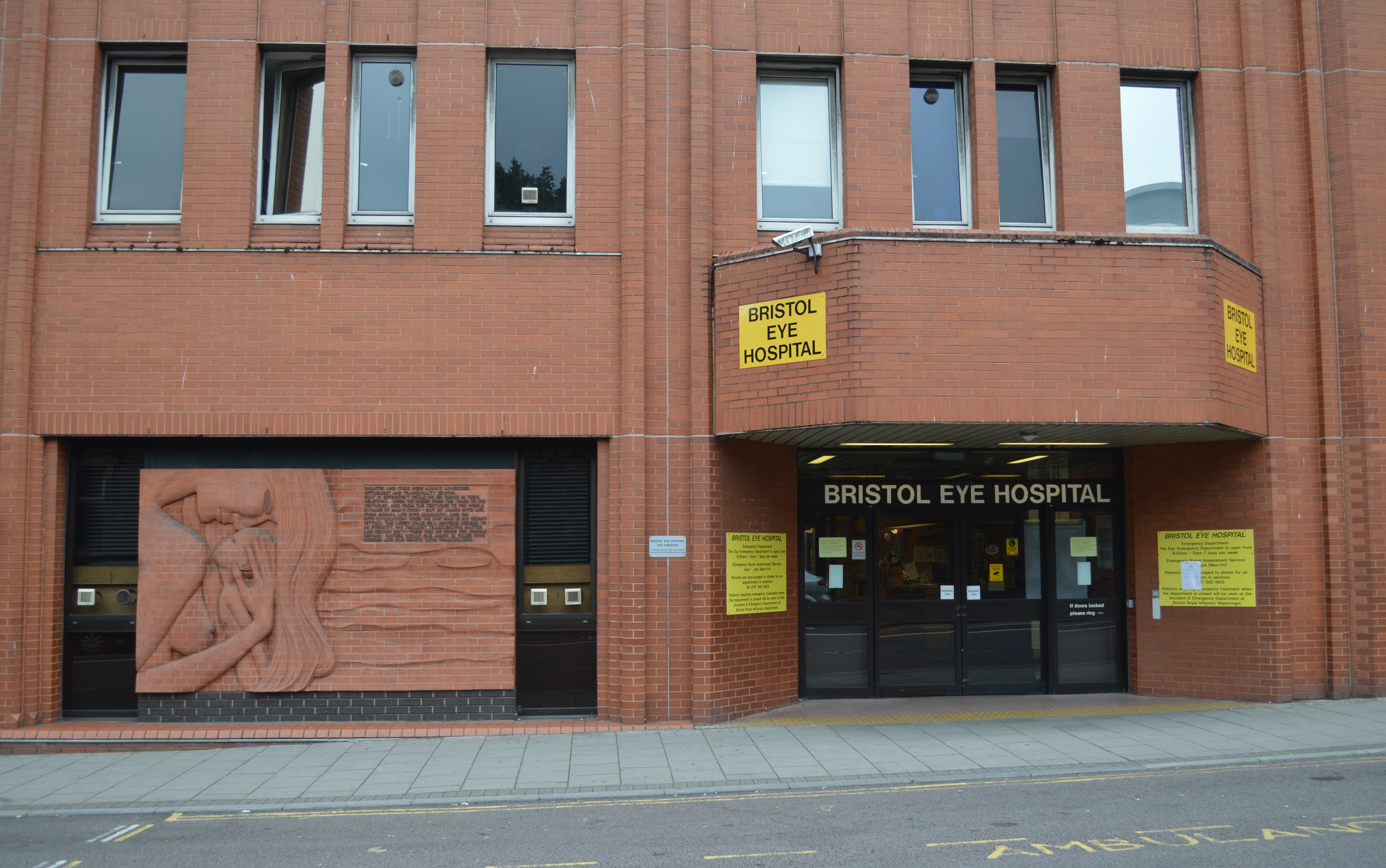
- Entrance and one of five art works, called The Creation by Walter Ritchie, along the hospital frontage

- Shown in Bristol

Geography
- Location: Bristol, England, United Kingdom
- Coordinates: 51.4584°N 2.5943°W

Organisation
- Care system: Public NHS
- Type: Teaching
- Affiliated university: University of Bristol, Faculty of Health and Social Care University of the West of England

Services
- Emergency department: Daytime
- Beds: 11
- Speciality: Ophthalmology

History
- Founded: 1808

Links
- Website: www.uhbristol.nhs.uk/patients-and-visitors/your-hospitals/bristol-eye-hospital/
- Lists: Hospitals in England

Bristol Eye Hospital is a specialist ophthalmic hospital in Bristol. It is part of the University Hospitals Bristol and Weston NHS Foundation Trust. The University of Bristol Dental Hospital is adjacent, and the Bristol Royal Infirmary is nearby.

== History ==
The hospital was founded in 1808 by Dr William Henry Goldwyer as "The Institution for the Cure of Disease of the Eye Amongst the Poor" in Lower Maudlin Street. In 1839, and again in 1898, it expanded into adjoining buildings. In 1935 a new building was completed, which was in turn replaced in 1982 creating the present hospital which opened in 1986. A refurbishment and expansion took place between 2010 and 2011.
