= Walter Ritchie =

British sculptor (1919–1997)

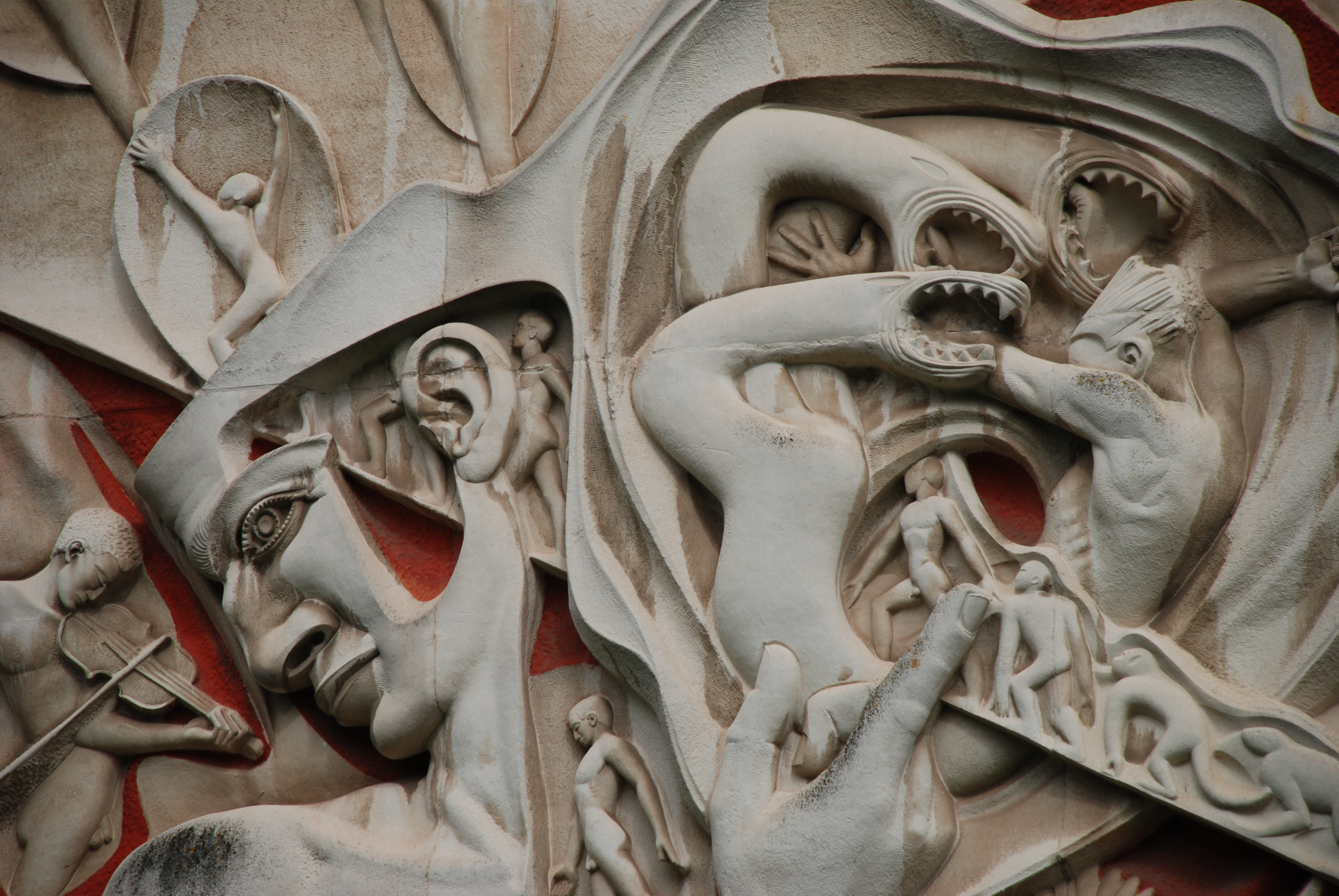
Detail of Man's Struggle by Walter Ritchie, Herbert Art Gallery and Museum.

Walter Ritchie (1919–1997) was a British sculptor.

== Biography ==
Ritchie was one of the last living pupils of Eric Gill at Pigotts near High Wycombe before the Second World War. Eric Gill died in 1940. Many of his public works were in stone, wood, metal and brick relief, as many of his commissions were for public buildings it depended on how much money was available to what materials were used and a lot of schools and public building chose brick as they could get more for the money, but some have suffered loss from building redevelopment.

Sir Herbert Read took an interest in the young sculptor and tried to introduce him to the London social life where he would be assured commissions. Instead, Ritchie chose to stay at home in Kenilworth which he had moved to in 1940 because of the Coventry Blitz.

== Public works ==
- Man's Struggle: Two large Portland stone reliefs in Coventry Precinct (created between 1954 and 1959) Since relocated to the outer wall of the Herbert Art Gallery and Museum in Coventry.
- "Richard Lee Memorial Sculpture - Dove of Peace" Bronze approx 4570mm, on 4m pole, Richard Lee School, The Drive, Coventry. Wooden sculpture for the Dove before casting in Bronze is displayed in the Belgrade Theatre, Coventry.
- The Queen and the Washerwomen: Intaglio relief in brown-veined Napoleon marble. Commission for Natwest Bank 1980. 32 Corn Street Bristol.
- The Creation: Series of large carved brick relief panels at Bristol Eye Hospital (created between 1981 and 1986).
- Len Hutton: The Oval cricket ground, London (created between 1988 and 1993).
- Three Aspects of a Girls Education: North Leamington School.
- Lovers: Brick relief panel, Delapré Abbey Walled Garden, Northampton (damaged).
- Lady with Kittens: Brick relief panel, Delapré Abbey, Northampton.
- The Flight into Egypt: Brick relief at St Joseph's Church, Whitnash, Warwickshire.
- Growth: Aluminium sculpture, Kenilworth School and Sixth Form, Kenilworth, Warwickshire.

== Gallery ==
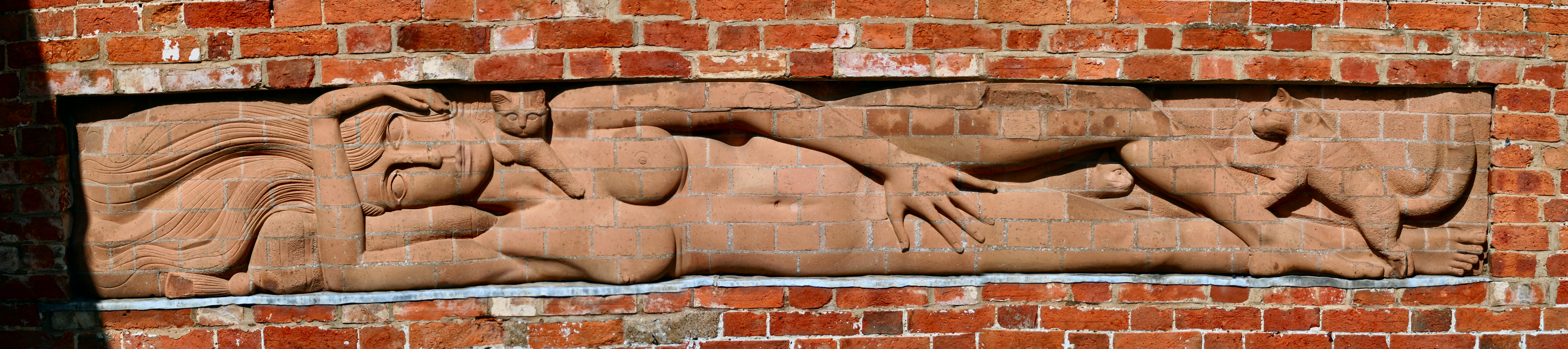
Lady with Kittens, Delapré Abbey.

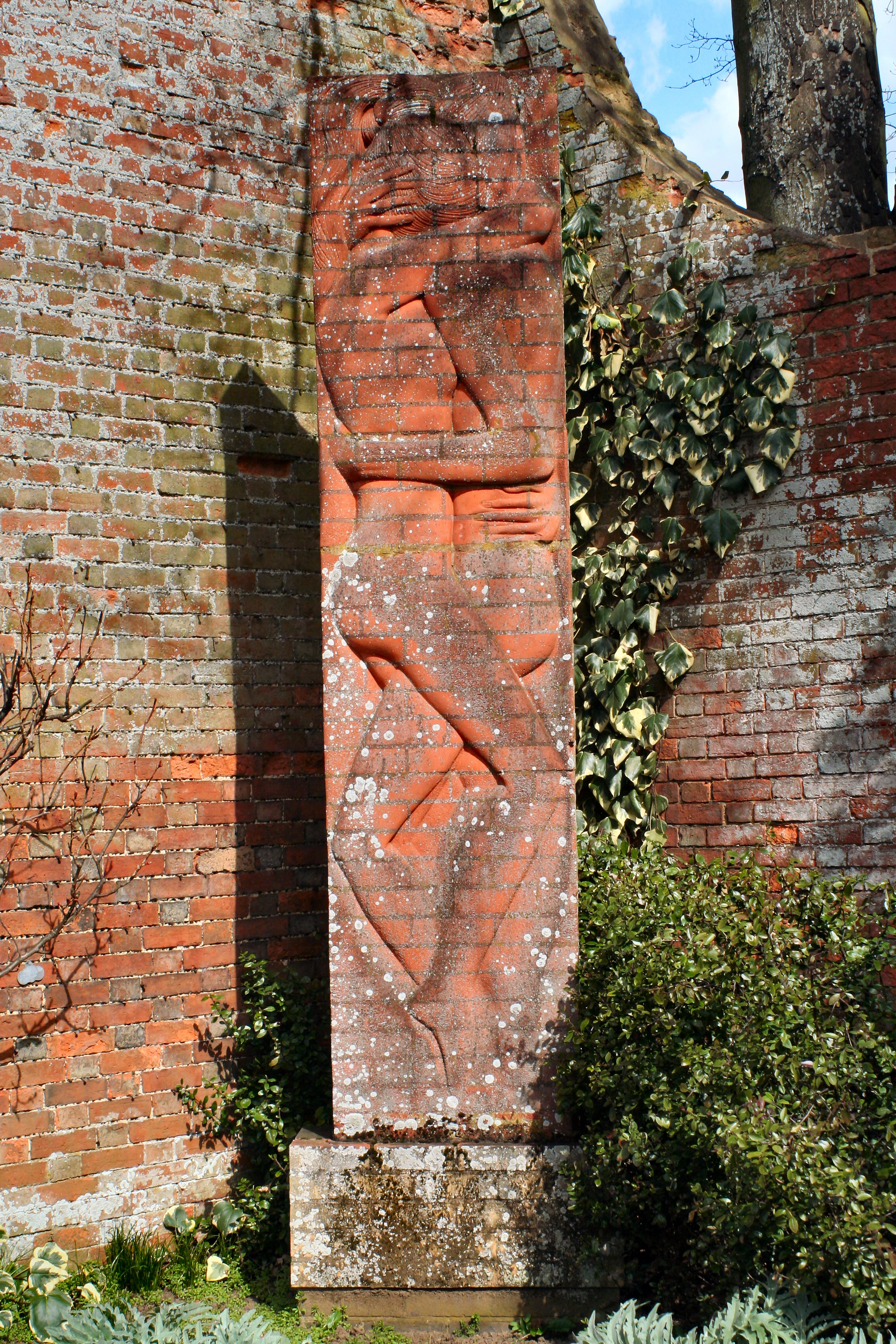
The Lovers, Delapré Abbey.

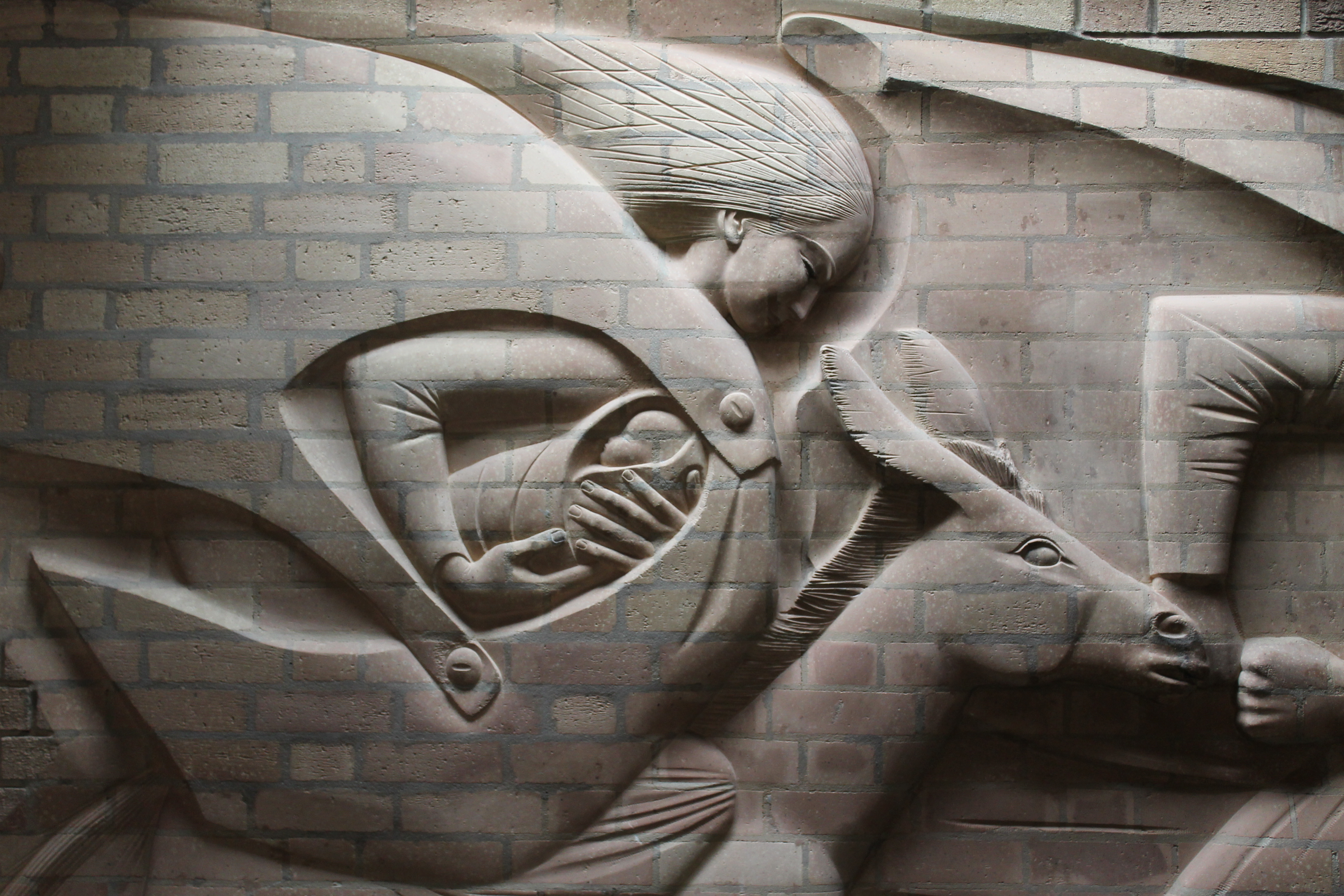
Detail of Flight into Egypt, Whitnash.

== Publications ==
- —— (1978). Sculpture In Brick & Other Materials. Walter Ritchie. ISBN 978-0950620503.
- —— (1979). Brick Sculptures.
- —— (1994). Walter Ritchie Sculpture. W. Ritchie. ISBN 978-0950620558.

== Illustrations for publications ==
- Quadruped Octaves (1983) (ISBN 095062053X / 0-9506205-3-X) Hall, Gaston. Illustrated by W. Ritchie.
- Alphabet Aviary (1986) by Gaston Hall, ISBN 0-9506205-4-8 illustrations W. Ritchie.

== Published by Ritchie (Kenilworth) ==
- My time with Eric Gill – A Memoir by Donald Potter (1980) ISBN 0-9506205-1-3. Limited edition of 500 copies [An erratum slip glued into books states that only 400 copies were printed].
- Damaged Beauty needs a new design: 20 Poems (1981) by John Bate. Limited edition of 310 copies.
