= University Hospitals Bristol and Weston NHS Foundation Trust =

NHS hospital trust in south west England 2020–2026

Coordinates: 51.4590°N 2.5963°W

- Former name: University Hospitals Bristol NHS Foundation Trust; United Bristol Healthcare NHS Trust
- Type: NHS foundation trust
- Established: 1 April 2020; 21 December 1990 as United Bristol Healthcare NHS Trust
- Disbanded: 1 July 2026
- Headquarters: Marlborough Street, Bristol
- Hospitals: Bristol Eye Hospital; Bristol Haematology and Oncology Centre; Bristol Heart Institute; Bristol Royal Hospital for Children; Bristol Royal Infirmary; South Bristol Community Hospital; St Michael's Hospital; University of Bristol Dental Hospital; Weston General Hospital
- Chair: Ingrid Barker
- Chief executive: Maria Kane
- Staff: 12,519 (2023/24)
- Website: www.uhbw.nhs.uk

The University Hospitals Bristol and Weston NHS Foundation Trust (UHBW) was a National Health Service foundation trust in Bristol and Weston-super-Mare, England. The trust ran Bristol Royal Infirmary, Bristol Heart Institute, Bristol Royal Hospital for Children, Bristol Eye Hospital, South Bristol Community Hospital, Bristol Haematology and Oncology Centre, St Michael's Hospital, University of Bristol Dental Hospital and, from 1 April 2020, Weston General Hospital.

On 1 July 2026, the trust merged with North Bristol NHS Trust to form Bristol NHS Foundation Trust.

== History ==
The United Bristol Healthcare NHS Trust was established on 21 December 1990, taking over the management of Bristol Royal Infirmary and associated sites from the Bristol and Weston Health Authority. In June 2008, the trust achieved NHS foundation trust status, becoming University Hospitals Bristol NHS Foundation Trust.

The trust agreed in 2011 that breast and urology services would pass to North Bristol NHS Trust during 2012, while in 2013–14 children's services, paediatric burns and neurosciences would transfer from North Bristol to the trust.

In January 2018, it was announced that University Hospitals Bristol NHS Foundation Trust was to merge with Weston Area Health NHS Trust, which runs the district general hospital in Weston-super-Mare, 19 miles (31 km) southwest of Bristol. This was formally completed on 1 April 2020, creating the University Hospitals Bristol and Weston NHS Foundation Trust.

In March 2026, the trust announced plans to merge with North Bristol NHS Trust to create Bristol NHS Foundation Trust. The two trusts officially merged on 1 July 2026.

== Leadership ==
Eugine Yafele, a former mental health nurse, was appointed chief executive in 2022, moving from the same position at Dorset HealthCare University NHS Foundation Trust. He topped the ranking of the Health Service Journal's rating of NHS chief executives. In November 2023, it was announced that Yafele was standing down as chief executive in early 2024 to take up a new role in Australia.

In December 2023, it was announced that North Bristol NHS Trust and University Hospitals Bristol and Weston NHS Foundation Trust would be appointing a joint chief executive and joint chair. In July 2024, Maria Kane was named as the new joint chief executive, following Ingrid Barker being named as the joint chair in April 2024.

== Performance ==
UHBW did well in the 2014 cancer patient experience survey and agreed to pair with South Tees Hospitals NHS Foundation Trust, which did badly, in a scheme intended to "spread and accelerate innovative practice via peer-to-peer support and learning". In September 2016, the trust was selected by NHS England as one of twelve Global Digital Exemplars.

In March 2017, the Care Quality Commission (CQC) rated UHBW as 'outstanding' and praised it for its strong culture of safety. It was the first NHS trust in England to jump from 'requires improvement' to 'outstanding' between two inspections. The CQC's chief inspector of hospitals, Professor Sir Mike Richards, hailed this as a "tremendous achievement".

In August 2019, the CQC rated UHBW as outstanding overall.

== Hospitals charity ==
Bristol & Weston Hospitals Charity (BWHC) fundraises for all UHBW hospitals, to provide additional facilities for patients, their families and staff. It was formerly known as Above & Beyond. BWHC has existed since 1974 and raises around £2M each year, funding a wide variety of projects including equipment, ward refurbishments and additional extras.

In 2009, BWHC raised £850,000 towards the opening of the Bristol Heart Institute.

In 2013, the charity launched the Golden Gift Appeal, which went on to raise £6M. The money was used towards a range of projects at the Bristol Royal Infirmary and Bristol Haematology and Oncology Centre.

The charity's Funny Bones comedy night in 2018, which featured performances from Russell Howard and Jon Richardson, raised £100,000.

== Research ==
Research and development within the UHBW NHS Foundation Trust primarily work in partnership with the University of Bristol, University of the West of England and North Bristol NHS Trust as well as other agencies on a multiple clinical research programmes.

== Wales ==
The trust decided in February 2014 that it would stop undertaking all "non-specialised, elective activity" for Welsh local health boards, unless covered by an existing contract, because of continuing payment issues.

== See also ==
- Healthcare in Bristol
- Healthcare in Somerset
- List of NHS trusts in England
