= Bristol Royal Hospital for Children =

Bristol Royal Hospital for Children (Bristol Children's Hospital)
- Bristol NHS Foundation Trust
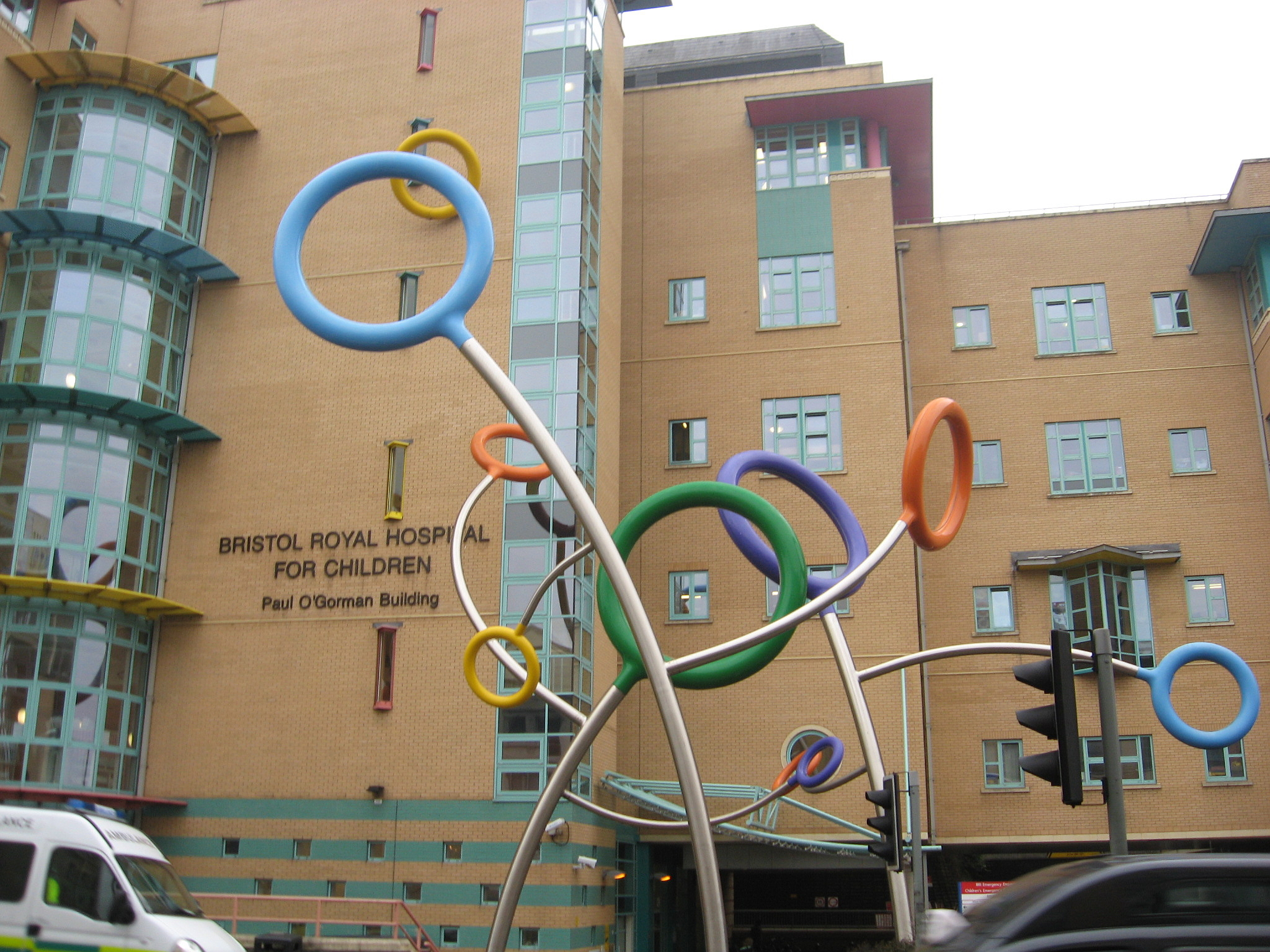
- Bristol Royal Hospital for Children

- Shown in Bristol

Geography
- Location: Bristol, England, United Kingdom
- Coordinates: 51°27′28″N 2°35′50″W

Organisation
- Care system: Public NHS
- Type: Paediatric hospital

Services
- Emergency department: Children's major trauma centre
- Beds: 152

Helipads
- Helipad: Yes

History
- Founded: 22 April 2001; 25 years ago

Links
- Website: www.uhbristol.nhs.uk/patients-and-visitors/your-hospitals/bristol-royal-hospital-for-children/
- Lists: Hospitals in England

Bristol Royal Hospital for Children, also known as the Bristol Children's Hospital, is a paediatric hospital in Bristol and the only paediatric major trauma centre in South West England. The hospital is part of the University Hospitals Bristol and Weston NHS Foundation Trust (UHBW), which includes eight other hospitals. The hospital is located next to the Bristol Royal Infirmary in the city centre.

== History ==
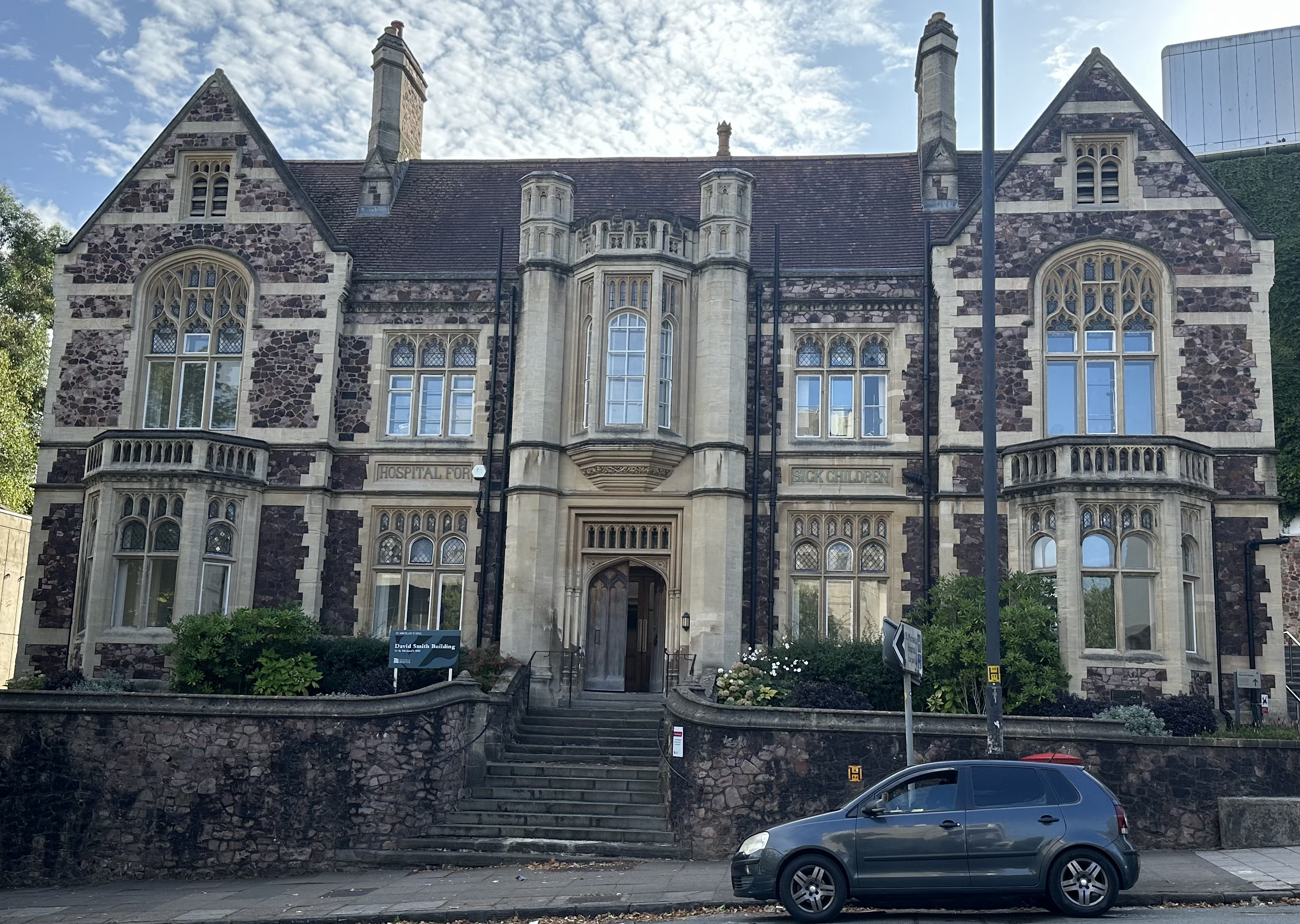
The earlier children's hospital, Bristol Royal Hospital for Sick Children, a grade-II listed building built 1885

The hospital has its origins in the Hospital for Sick Children on St Michael's Hill founded in 1866. The initial building was a large converted dwelling house on Royal Fort Road, south of the Royal Fort gatehouse, with accommodation for 40 patients. One of the hospital's first salaried doctors was the pioneering female surgeon, Eliza Walker, appointed as House Surgeon in 1873.

A much expanded hospital was built nearby to the designs of Robert Carwen in the Tudor gothic revival style in 1885. Only the entrance building fronting on to St Michael's Hill now survives. The hospital was later renamed as the Bristol Royal Hospital for Sick Children.

The new Children's Hospital opened on 22 April 2001, replacing the old children's hospital on St Michael's Hill, at a cost £30 million. One of the main aims of the design, in addition to providing the most up-to-date facilities possible, was to overcome many of the difficulties that face patients, families and staff.

In February 2014, it was agreed an inquiry would be held into the Bristol heart scandal, following heart surgery deaths at the hospital. The inquiry published a report in June 2016, saying that “parents had been let down”.

An extension was built to accommodate services moved from Frenchay Hospital in 2014, including neuroscience, scoliosis surgery, burns and plastic surgery, bringing all inpatient children's services in Bristol to one location. In 2015, a neuro-rehabilitation unit was built to support the moved services. In May 2014, a new helipad on the roof of the neighbouring Bristol Royal Infirmary became fully operational and will receive air ambulances from Bristol and the surrounding area, which will speed up transfer times for patients who are air lifted to the hospital. The HELP Appeal supported the construction of the helipad with a grant of £500,000.

== Charities ==
=== Wallace and Gromit's Grand Appeal ===
Wallace & Gromit's Grand Appeal is the only charity that fundraises exclusively for the hospital and the neonatal intensive care unit at St Michael's Hospital, to provide facilities and comforts for patients and their families.

The Grand Appeal raised £12M towards the new building for the child-friendly hospital, which opened in April 2001. Since then, the charity has funded a wide variety of programmes for patients valued at over £5M including arts, entertainment, education, play and music programmes; equipment; family accommodation facilities; comforts for patients; ward enhancement and new medical facilities in the Neonatal Intensive Care Unit.

At the beginning of July 2013, The Grand Appeal launched a project named Gromit Unleashed, a public art exhibition led by Wallace & Gromit's Grand Appeal and Aardman Animations, in which eighty 5-foot (1.5 m) tall artist-decorated fibreglass sculptures of Gromit were placed on the streets of Bristol and the surrounding area for ten weeks. Sculptures were decorated by a range of artists and celebrities, including Joanna Lumley, Sir Peter Blake, Cath Kidston and Jools Holland.

At the end of the art trail, each sculpture was auctioned to raise funds for Bristol Children's Hospital. The Grand Appeal has pledged to raise £3.5M for equipment for Bristol Children's Hospital, including a CT Scanner, an intraoperative MRI scanner, family facilities and child-friendly artwork. All funds raised by Gromit Unleashed will contribute towards this.

=== Bristol & Weston Hospitals Charity ===
Bristol & Weston Hospitals Charity (BWHC) raises around £2M for all ten hospitals in the trust. It provides equipment, ward refurbishments and additional extras. It was formerly known as Above & Beyond and has existed since 1974. In 2013, the charity's Golden Gift Appeal raised £6M.

== Art ==
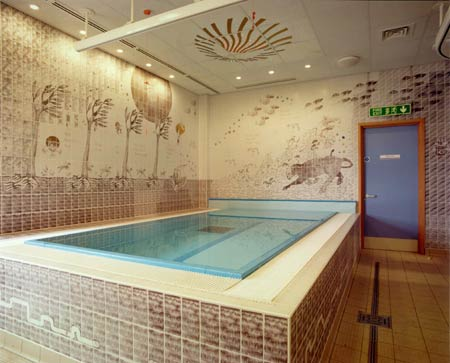
Hydrotherapy Pool Wall Mural, Bristol Royal Hospital for Children, 1998

In 1997, arts consultant, Lesley Greene, was commissioned to develop an arts strategy for the new hospital. This project was committed to integrated designs, a commitment to consultation and the family. Her active research programme led to the appointment of lead artist, Ray Smith, Eva Elsner, and Annie Lovejoy who contributed to the planning of the commissions programme.

Artworks were commissioned from more than twenty artists, many of which were site specific. These commissions were funded by the hospital's own fundraising arm, The Wallace and Gromit Grand Appeal.

== Archives ==
Records of the Bristol Royal Hospital for Children are held at Bristol Archives (Ref. 37424) (online catalogue) and School of Nursing records (Ref. 38973) (online catalogue).

== See also ==
- List of hospitals in England
