= Bristol Royal Infirmary =

Hospital in Bristol, England

- Bristol NHS Foundation Trust
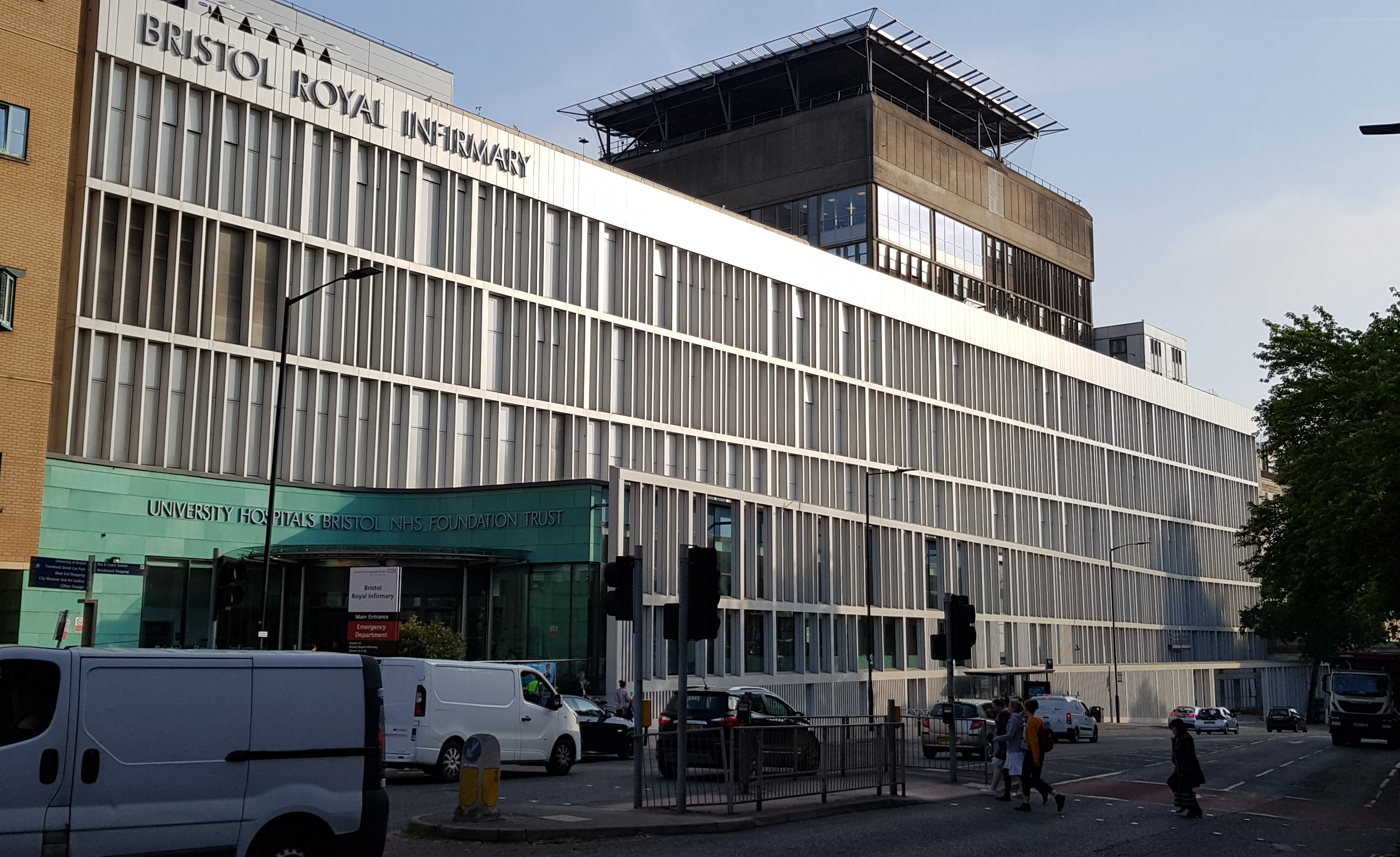
- Bristol Royal Infirmary

- Shown in Bristol

Geography
- Location: Bristol, England, United Kingdom
- Coordinates: 51.4590°N 2.5963°W

Organisation
- Care system: Public NHS
- Type: Teaching
- Affiliated university: University of Bristol, Faculty of Health and Social Care University of the West of England

Services
- Emergency department: Yes Accident & Emergency
- Beds: 669
- Speciality: Cardiothoracic services for the South West region, adult cystic fibrosis centre for Severn

Helipads
- Helipad: Yes

History
- Founded: 1735

Links
- Website: www.uhbristol.nhs.uk/patients-and-visitors/your-hospitals/bristol-royal-infirmary/
- Lists: Hospitals in England

The Bristol Royal Infirmary (BRI) is a large teaching hospital in the centre of Bristol, England. It has links with the nearby University of Bristol and the Faculty of Health and Social Care at the University of the West of England, also in Bristol.

The BRI is one of nine hospitals operated by Bristol NHS Foundation Trust. It is on the same site as the Bristol Royal Hospital for Children, Bristol Haematology and Oncology Centre, and Bristol Heart Institute (BHI). The Bristol Haematology and Oncology Centre has 49 beds and the Bristol Heart Institute has 107, which are not included in the main hospital's total.

== History ==
=== Early history ===
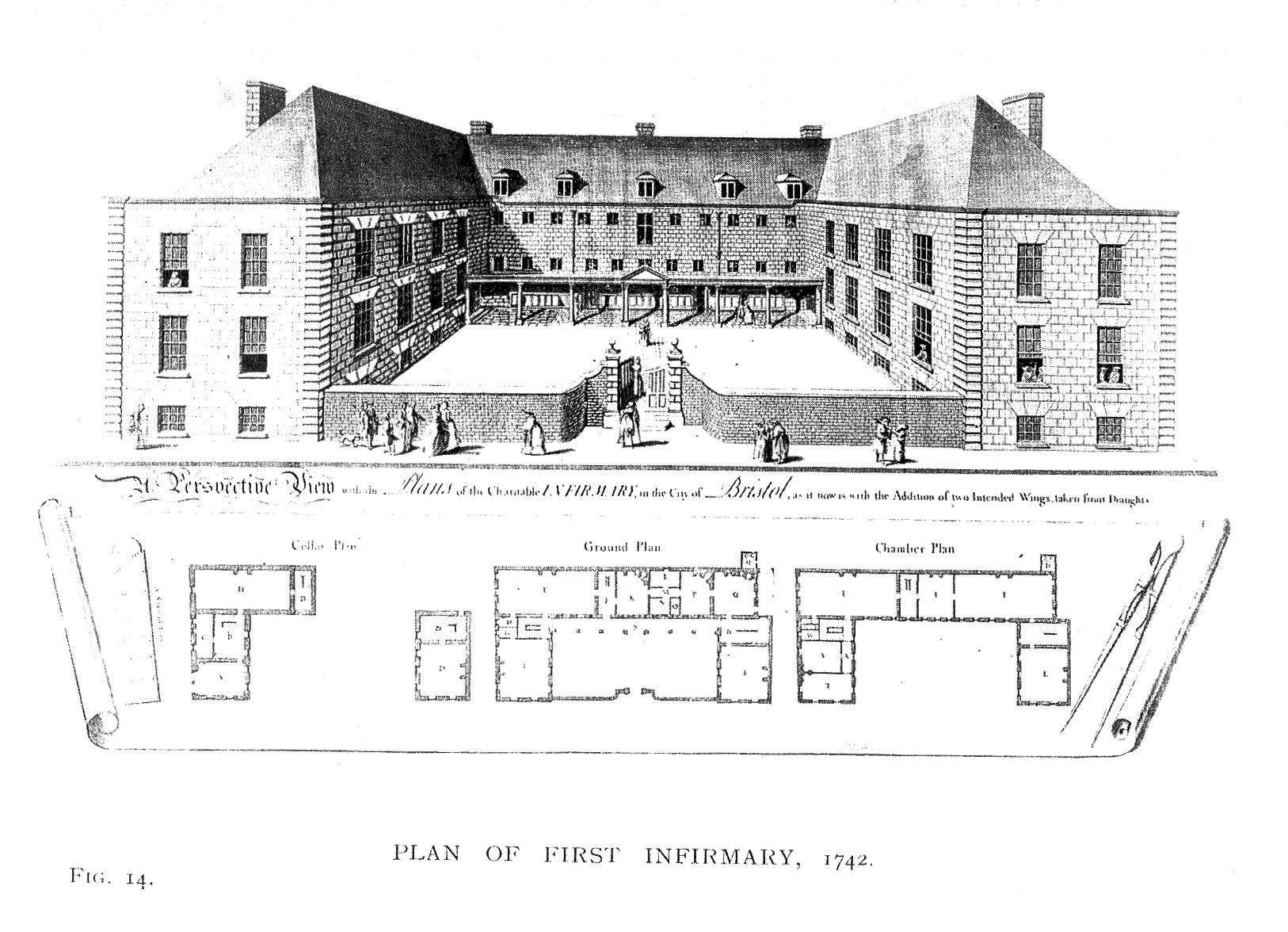
Plan of the first infirmary, 1742

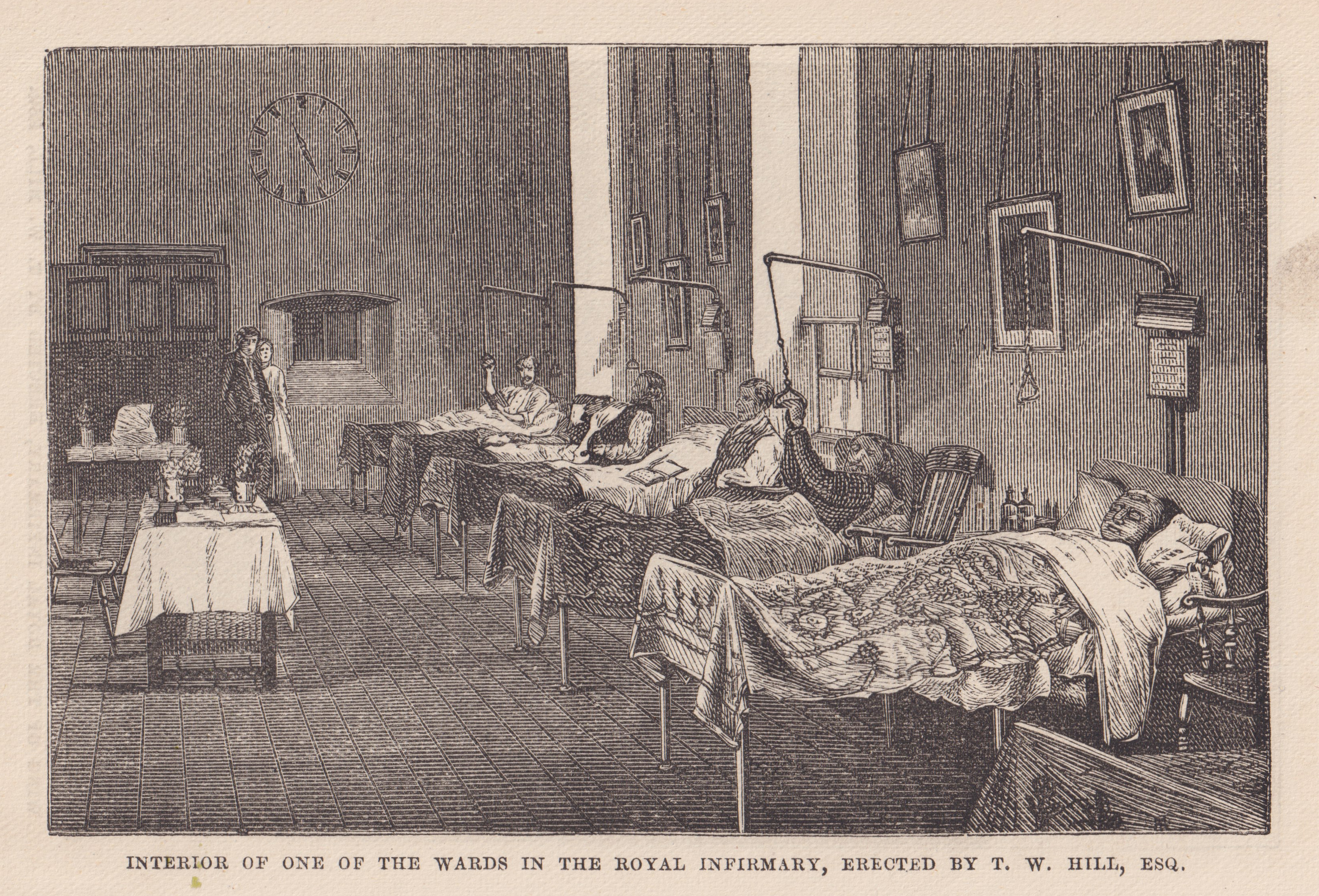
A ward in the BRI, 1872

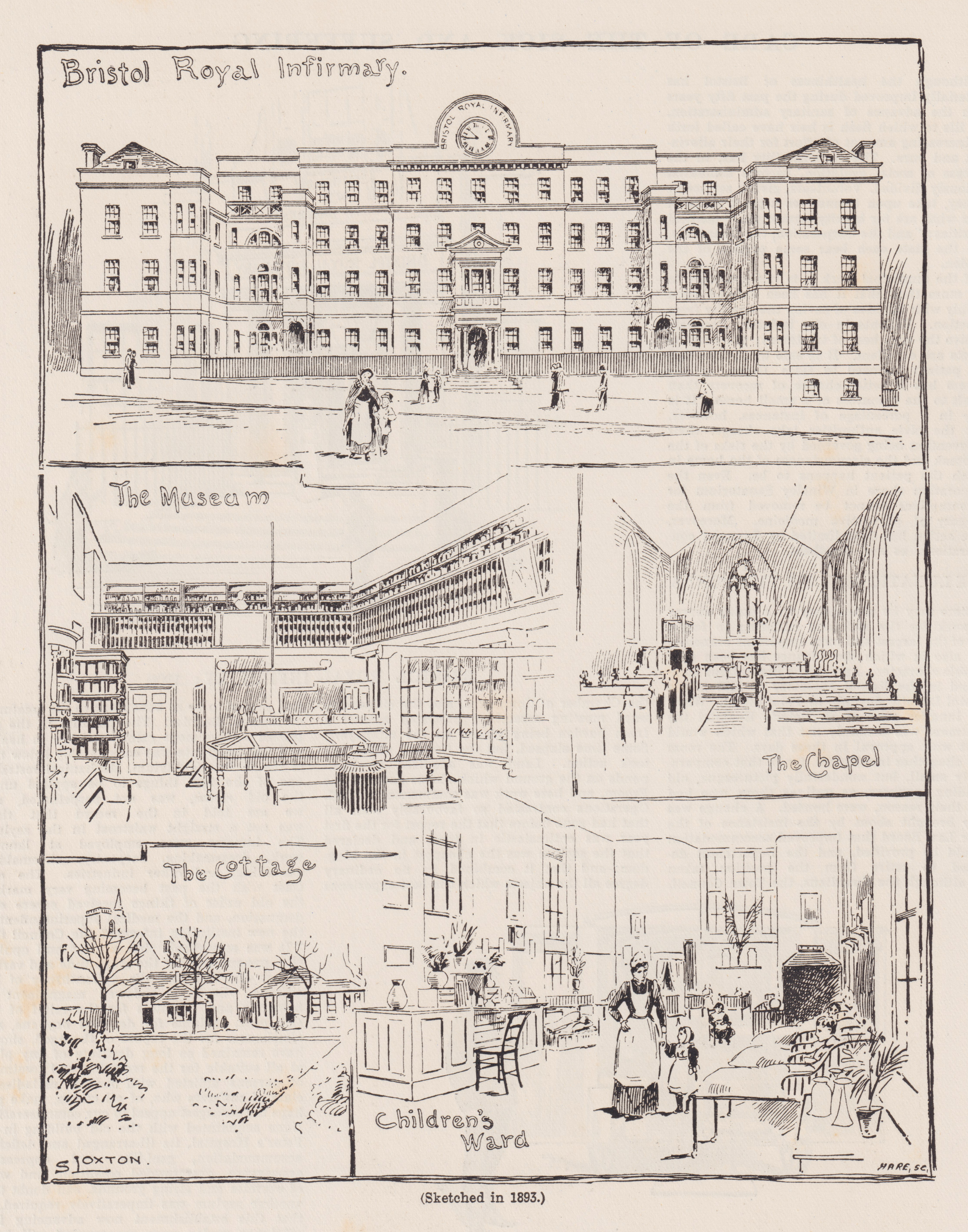
Newspaper illustration of BRI, 1893

The Bristol Royal Infirmary was founded by public subscription in 1735, making it one of the oldest infirmaries in the United Kingdom. The infirmary was opened on Maudlin Lane (now Lower Maudlin Street) in December 1737, taking 17 male and 17 female patients. One of its benefactors in 1762, was John Tonge from the prominent Tonge slave trading family of Bristol.

In 1904, Sir George White, who gave Bristol its first electric tramway service and established what was to become the Bristol Aeroplane Company, released the hospital from debts of over £15,500. This was achieved by holding a fundraising carnival at Bristol Zoo in 1905 which raised £4,000, together with donations of £7,500 by Sir George and £4,000 by his brother Samuel.

George White was appointed president of the hospital in 1906. Recognising the need to modernise the hospital building to keep up with innovations in science and medicine, he established a £50,000 fund for a new hospital building. This led to the construction of the Edward VII Memorial Wing which was designed by Charles Holden and completed in 1912. Annual income came from subscribers, whose number increased from 1,272 in 1906 to 3,771 in 1913.

A fireplace in the entrance hall of the Edward VII building was tiled with Persian style designs typical of the work of William De Morgan who was associated with the Arts and Crafts movement.

During the First World War, the Memorial Wing at Bristol Royal Infirmary together with Southmead Hospital were requisitioned by the War Office to create the 2nd Southern General Hospital, a facility for the Royal Army Medical Corps to treat military casualties.

After the war, there were attempts to amalgamate the Royal Infirmary with Bristol General Hospital to allow greater division of labour and the provision of specialist services. In 1920, Henry Herbert Wills sought to promote this by depositing £105,070 in a trust to be handed over if the hospitals could be combined. This proved impossible because of a century-long rivalry between the two, exacerbated by the Royal Infirmary being supported primarily by Anglican Tories, while the General Hospital was supported by nonconformist Whigs. The joke in Bristol was that 'patients going to the Infirmary would receive a sovereign remedy, but those at the Hospital a radical cure'.

=== Post-war development ===
Geoffrey Tovey, serologist and founder of the UK Transplant Service, worked at the hospital shortly before the Second World War. The hospital became part of the National Health Service in 1948 and was greatly extended in the 1960s. The Queen's Building extension opened in 1972; the Bristol Haematology and Oncology Centre, behind the main hospital building, opened in 1971; and the adjacent Bristol Heart Institute opened in 2009.

=== Bristol heart scandal ===
The Bristol heart scandal, which resulted in the deaths of a number of babies and young children during heart surgery (1984–1995) led to the Kennedy Report into paediatric cardiac surgical services at the hospital. The report, published in 2001, led to greater emphasis on clinical governance within the NHS and the publication of the performance ratings of individual heart surgeons.

=== Redevelopment ===
In April 2011, the trust board approved an £80 million redevelopment of the hospital, consisting of a new ward block on Terrell Street behind the hospital, the refurbishment of the Queen's building, the conversion of wards in the King Edward building and the decommissioning of the Old Building. In September 2011, it was announced that Laing O'Rourke had signed a contract to redevelop the hospital and build an extension to the Bristol Royal Hospital for Children.

The redevelopment project included purpose-built medical and elderly care admissions units, a state-of-the-art intensive care unit, a surgical floor and a helipad on the roof of the Queen's Building.

The redevelopment also included building a new Welcome Centre at the main entrance of the hospital and a new facade for the Queen's building, once voted one of the ugliest buildings in Bristol, designed by the Spanish firm Nieto Sobejano Arquitectos. Construction began on the new hospital ward block in March 2011, with the demolition of buildings on Terrell Street. The newly completed Welcome Centre was opened to the public in December 2013. In May 2014, the helipad became fully operational and started receiving air ambulances from Bristol and the surrounding area, speeding up transfer times for patients who were being airlifted to the hospital. The HELP Appeal supported the construction of the helipad with a grant of £500,000.

=== Notable staff ===
- Anna Ballie RRC (1864–1958). Matron 1898–1923, also Principal Matron Territorial Force Nursing Service 2nd Southern General Hospital (BRI and Southmead Hospitals), 1914–1919. Baillie trained at The London Hospital under Eva Luckes in 1888. Before Baillie was appointed to Bristol she was matron of the Hospital of St Cross, Rugby. She became one of the first supporters and promoters of the College of Nursing (now RCN). Baillie was noted as an 'inspiring manager' who established a well respected training school for nurses.
- Emily 'Margaret' Cummins, RRC (1866–1934). In 1898 she was recommended as for a sister's position under Anna Baillie. Shortly after moving to Bristol, Cummins was appointed Assistant Matron. Whilst there she undertook a session as a Lecturer on Nursing for the Merchants Venturers Technical College, Bristol. In 1903 she was appointed as matron of Cumberland Infirmary in Carlisle. From 1911 until 1924 Cummins was matron of the Liverpool Royal Infirmary.
- Henrietta Hannath RRC and Bar (1864–1939) was a night sister at the hospital 1895-1898. She became matron of the Royal Hospital, Wolverhampton in 1906. She was also Matron of the 5th Northern General Hospital, Leicester.

=== Archives ===
The archives of the Bristol Royal Infirmary are held at Bristol Archives. The School of Nursing, records of surgery and the dispensary, and records relating to the 1991 inquiry into children's heart surgery at the infirmary are also held at Bristol Archives. A substantial quantity of material about the history of the infirmary can be found in papers collected by the surgeon Richard Smith.

== Hospital charity ==
Bristol & Weston Hospitals Charity (BWHC) raises money for all ten hospitals in the trust, to provide equipment, ward refurbishments and additional extras. It was formerly known as Above & Beyond and has existed since 1974. In 2013, the charity's Golden Gift Appeal raised £6 million. For the year to March 2022, the charity's income was £2.64 million.

== In popular culture ==
Holby City Hospital, in the fictional city of Holby, which appears in the BBC medical dramas Casualty and Holby City, is based on the BRI.

== See also ==
- Healthcare in Bristol
- Southmead Hospital

== Sources ==
- Munro Smith, George (1917). A history of the Bristol Royal Infirmary. J.W. Arrowsmith – via Internet Archive.
- Perry, C. Bruce (1984). The Voluntary Medical Institutions of Bristol (Bristol Historical Association pamphlets, no. 56), 20 pp.
