= Nia King =

American art activist and podcaster

Nia King is an art activist, journalist, and podcaster in Oakland, California. She is best known for her podcast "We Want the Airwaves," where she interviews queer and trans artists about their lives and work.

== Career ==
King's work focuses on topics such as race, self-reflection, and sexuality, and considers participation in political movements to be essential to her work.

King co-edited the book Queer and Trans Artists of Color: Stories of Some of Our Lives (2014) with Jessica Glennon-Zukoff and Terra Mikalson. This collection was based upon the first year of the podcasts she created, which primarily focuses on experiences of Black and Latin persons. The book includes King's interviews with Ryka Aoki, Yosimar Reyes, Kortney Ryan Ziegler, Julio Salgado, Leah Lakshmi Piepzna-Samarasinha, Janet Mock, and others. The Advocate listed this book on its list of the Year's 10 Best Transgender Non-Fiction books in 2014.

Her second book, Queer and Trans Artists of Color, Volume 2 is a collection of interviews discussing race, sexuality, and systematic oppression.

Both works were self published. King has stated this is because her work is not mainstream enough for larger publishing institutions to be interested in backing her work. She has also stated that she finds self-publishing more accessible than traditional publishing to marginalized authors.

King is host and producer of the podcast We Want the Airwaves. The podcast consists of interviews of queer and trans artists of color. King has stated that the title is a reference to a song by American punk band The Ramones, and ties into her views that marginalized people should have more space within media.

King worked as an illustrator for Voices of Mixed Heritage: Crossing Borders, Bridging Generations, a curriculum kit for grades 6–12 published by Brooklyn Historical Society.

== Personal life ==
King graduated from Mills College in 2011. She is originally from Boston, Massachusetts. She is mixed race and of Black/Lebanese/Hungarian descent. King also identifies as queer.

== Selected works ==
- Art School is Hell (2013)
- Angry black-white girl: Reflections on my mixed race identity
- MXD zine!: True stories by mixed race writers, a collection of poems and articles about being a mixed race person in the United States
- Borderlands: Tales from disputed territories between races and cultures, a sequel to MXD zine!
- Borderlands 2: It's a family affair
- We Are Not White Lesbians, a collection of comics about Nia King and her boyfriend, a transgender man
