= Joff =

Joff may refer to:

- Joff Ellen (1915–1999), Australian actor and comedian
- JoFF Rae (born 1966), New Zealand artist and event producer
- Joff Bush (born 1987), composer for the Australian children's TV series Bluey
- Joff Oddie, guitarist in the English band Wolf Alice

== See also ==
- Xerjoff
