= Schools Not Prisons =

1. SchoolsNotPrisonsTour
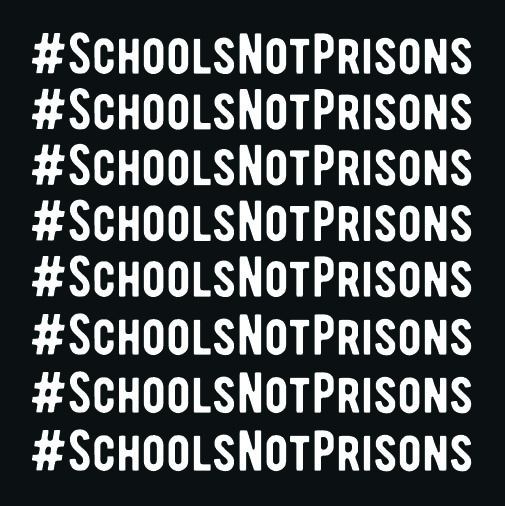
- Begins: August 6, 2016
- Founder: Revolve Impact
- Area: California, U.S.A.
- Website: https://schoolsnotprisons.com/

The #SchoolsNotPrisons Tour is a free music and art initiative that partners with California communities affected by the overuse of punishment and incarceration.

The #SchoolsNotPrisons Tour promotes nonviolence and youth activism, while also encouraging voting as a key tool for communities committed to safety, justice, and peace to create positive change. The tour highlights the issue of mass incarceration in California, where state spending has prioritized prisons under the mistaken belief that punishment ensures safety. In reality, this approach has disrupted families and communities—particularly communities of color—and limited opportunities for young people.

Since 1980, California has built 22 prisons but only one University of California campus, and in 2014, youth arrests exceeded youth voter turnout. Tour partners and artists advocate for a new model of community and school safety rooted in health, education, and investment in youth.

The 2016 #SchoolsNotPrisons Tour was produced by Revolve Impact, with support from The California Endowment and The California Wellness Foundation.

== Partners ==
- The California Endowment
- Revolve Impact
- The California Wellness Foundation
- Asian American Advancing Justice
- All of Us or None
- ACCE Action
- Anti-Recidivism Coalition
- Alliance for Boys and Men of Color
- California Calls
- Californians for Safety and Justice
- Children's Defense Fund
- CHIRLA
- Ella Baker Center for Human Rights
- Immigrant Legal Resource Center
- Mobilize the Immigrant Vote
- PICO California
- Presente.org
- Youth Law Center
- Always Knocking Inc.
- East Bay Asian Youth Center
- Sacramento Area Congregations Together
- Sol Collective
- Youth Development Support Services
- Faith in Fresno
- Fresno Barrios Unidos
- The Know Youth Media
- New America Media
- American Civil Liberties Union
- California Partnership
- Coachella UnIncorporated
- Raices Cultura
- TODEC Legal Center]]
- Social Immigration Project
- San Diego State University
- Fathers and Families of San Joaquin
- Little Manilla
- San Joaquin Pride Center
- Sons and Brothers
- Reinvent South Stockton Coalition
- Blu Educational Foundation
- Congregations Organized for Prophetic Engagement
- ICUC
- Life Center Church
- Youth Action Project
- Youth Law Center
- Culture Strike
- California Immigrant Policy Center
- National Council of La Raza
- RYSE Center
- Operation Street Kidz Philanthropy Kidz Club
- African Coalition Workforce
- Advancement Project
- Mother of Many
- California School-Based Health Alliance
- FuseBox Radio
- First Place For Youth
- Southeast Asian Resource Action Center
- Coleman Advocates
- Acta Non Verba Youth Urban Farm Project
- Centro Legal De La Raza
- Movement Strategy Center
- The Unity Council
- The Gathering For Justice
- World Trust Educational Services

Date	Location	Events	Location	Performers
August 6, 2016	Sacramento, CA	Schools Not Prisons	Sacramento City College	Ty Dolla $ign, Buyepongo, John Forté, Mystic, Orijanus, Mariachi Arcoiris de Los Angeles, and DJ Ome.
August 27, 2016	San Bernardino, CA	Schools Not Prisons	Cal State San Bernardino	Diggy Simmons, Audio Push, Mistah F.A.B., Jasiri X, Low Leaf, The Occupation, Orijanus, and local artists from San Bernardino.
September 10, 2016	Oakland, CA	Schools Not Prisons	Private	La Santa Cecilia, Jasiri X, Mistah F.A.B., Audio Push, Buyepongo, Mystic, Sake One, Ceci Bastida, Sellassie, Georgia Music Group, Young Gifted and Black, and Brotherhood of Elders. In conjunction with the Formerly Incarcerated People and Families Movement.
September 18, 2016	Calipatria, CA	Schools Not Prisons	Calipatria State Prison	Pusha T, John Forté, Mike De La Rocha.
September 24, 2016	Fresno, CA	Schools Not Prisons	Fresno City College	La Santa Cecilia, Fashawn, Mistah F.A.B., Audio Push, Low Leaf, Mariachi Arcoiris de Los Angeles, Sake One, Dulce Upfront, and local Fresno artists.
September 30, 2016	Los Angeles, CA	Schools Not Prisons	Youth Justice Coalition	Los Rakas, Buyepongo, Audio Push, Jasiri X, Kimya Dawson, Seti X, AJ Subat, and local Los Angeles artists.
October 8, 2016	Oxnard, CA	Schools Not Prisons	Oxnard Pal Teen Center and Juvenile Justice Complex	Immortal Technique, Buyepongo, Chino XL, Ceci Bastida, John Forté, Mystic, DJ J Scratch, Nicko and Raj, Moxie Raia, Kimya Dawson, and Sound Effect.
October 14, 2016	San Diego, CA	Schools Not Prisons	Jacobs Center for Neighborhood Innovation	Aloe Blacc, Maya Jupiter, Big June, Buyepongo, Mike De La Rocha, DJ Antiq, and Ceci Bastida.
October 22, 2016	Corona, CA	Schools Not Prisons	California Institution for Women	Los Rakas, Mike De La Rocha, and Mystic
October 28, 2016	Stockton, CA	Schools Not Prisons and Freedom Fest	Stockton Civic Auditorium	Los Rakas, Mistah F.A.B., Low Leaf, Supaman, Orijanus, Mystic, Natural Revolution, Culture Strike, Brotherhood of Elders, and local artists from Stockton
