= Artivism =

Art activism

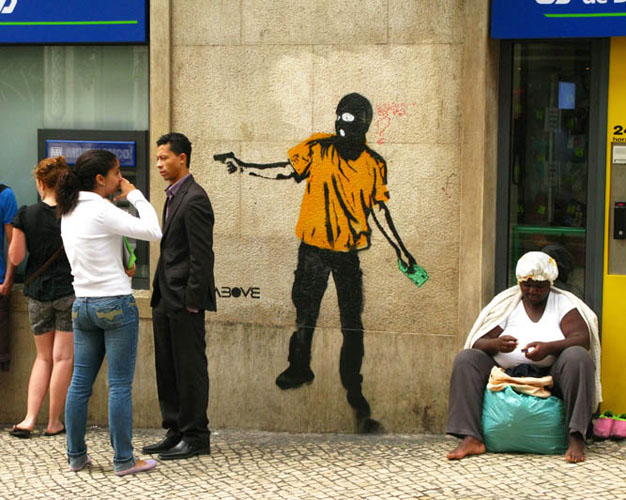
Giving to the Poor, a stencil by American street artist Above addressing the issue of homelessness (Lisbon, Portugal, 2008)

Artivism is a portmanteau word combining "art" and "activism", and is sometimes also referred to as social artivism. It may be seen as a modern form of protest art.

== History ==
Protest art has a long history. Artists have long expressed their views on society and the world around them, with the intent of bringing about change.

The term artivism in US English has its roots in a 1997 gathering of Chicano artists from East Los Angeles and the Zapatistas in Chiapas, Mexico. The words "artivist" and "artivism" were then popularized through a variety of events, actions and artworks via artists and musicians such as Quetzal, Ozomatli, and Mujeres de Maiz, among other East Los Angeles artists, and at spaces such as Self Help Graphics & Art.

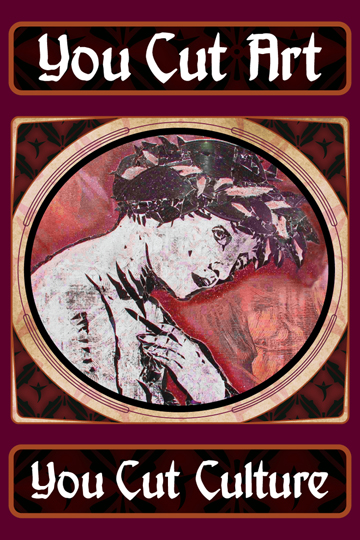
You Cut Art, You Cut Culture by Artica Concepts

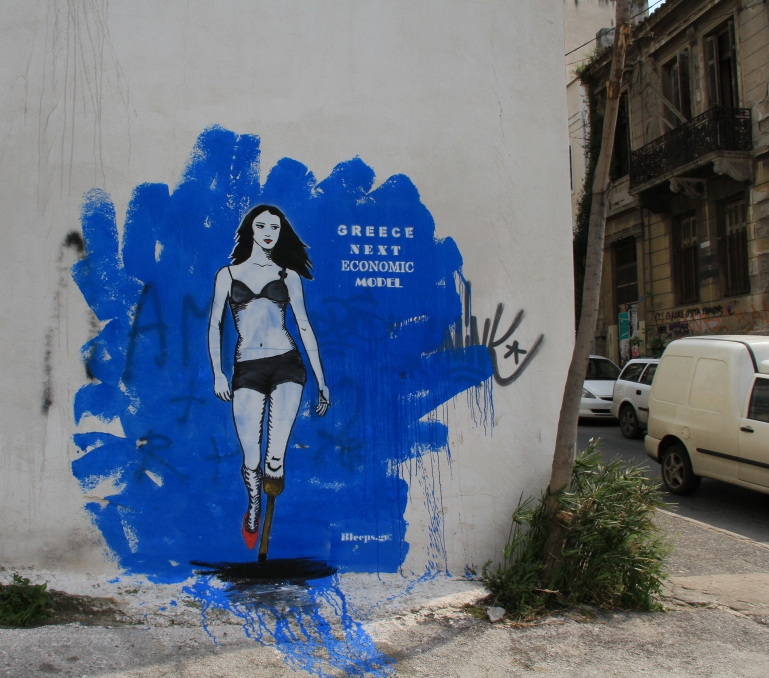
Greece Next Economic Model by Bleepsgr in Athens, Greece

Artivism further developed as antiwar and anti-globalization protests emerged and proliferated. In many cases artivists attempt to push political agendas by the means of art, but a focus on raising awareness of social, environmental, and technological problems is also common.

By 2005, the term had made its way into academic writing, when Slovenian theatre scholar Aldo Milohnic used the term to discuss "autonomous ('alter-globalist', social) movements in Slovenia that attracted wide attention. In carrying out their political activity they made use of protests and direct actions, thereby introducing the 'aesthetic', willingly or not". In 2008, Chela Sandoval and Guisela Latorre published a piece on Chicano/a artivism and M. K. Asante using the term in reference to Black artists.

In 2013 Cromoactivismo, a Brazilian group of women artists, started working with collectives, groups, and schools in direct actions using color for social change.

The impact of artivism vs. conventional activism was tested in a public scientific experiment in Copenhagen, Denmark, in 2018. The results, reported in the journal of Social Movement Studies, suggest that artivism may be more effective than conventional activism.

== Description ==
Artivist Eve Ensler described artivism thus:

This passion has all the ingredients of activism, but is charged with the wild creations of art. Artivism—where edges are pushed, imagination is freed, and a new language emerges altogether." Bruce Lyons has written: "... artivism ... promotes the essential understanding that ... [humans] ... can, through courageous creative expression, experience the unifying power of love when courage harnesses itself to the task of art + social responsibility.

Besides using traditional mediums like film and music to raise awareness or push for change, an artivist can also be involved in culture jamming, subvertising, street art, spoken word, protesting, and activism.

There is a chapter on artivism in the book It's Bigger Than Hip Hop by M. K. Asante, published in 2008. Asante writes of the artivist:

The artivist (artist + activist) uses their artistic talents to fight and struggle against injustice and oppression—by any medium necessary. The artivist merges commitment to freedom and justice with the pen, the lens, the brush, the voice, the body, and the imagination. The artivist knows that to make an observation is to have an obligation.

According to UN Peacekeeping, artivism "has become an essential part of global peace campaigns, turning abstract concepts like peace and security into tangible, relatable experiences". On the 2024 International Day of Peace, the UN Department of Peace Operations collaborated with street artist Detour, who created a "live painting" event at the UN headquarters in New York City. Attendees were encouraged to contribute their own messages of peace on a second canvas. Actor Nikolaj Coster-Waldau, who was UNDP Goodwill Ambassador, along with American actress Kat Graham, and Paris mayor Anne Hidalgo contributed.

== Conference ==
The Inaugural Global Artivism Conference took place in Tshwane, South Africa, in September 5-8, 2024.

== Artivists ==
Notable artivists and self-identified artist-activists include:

- Above
- Ai Weiwei
- Aja Monet
- Alfredo Meschi
- Aloe Blacc
- Annie Sprinkle
- Anomie Belle
- Banksy
- Bleepsgr
- Bordalo II
- Daniel Arzola
- David Wojnarowicz
- Deborah De Robertis
- Deeyah Khan
- Donald "C-Note" Hooker
- Ernest Zacharevic
- Favianna Rodriguez
- Fredericka Foster
- Gianluca Costantini
- Guillermo Gómez-Peña
- JoFF Rae
- JR
- Jeanmarie Simpson
- Judy Baca
- Julio Salgado
- Kwame Akoto-Bamfo
- Las Cafeteras
- Lila Downs
- Lost Children of Babylon
- Lynnette Haozous
- Martha Gonzalez
- Marina DeBris
- Martin Aveling
- Maya Jupiter
- Michel Platnic
- Milo Moiré
- Norm Magnusson
- Pamina Sebastião
- Paolo Cirio
- Pavel 183
- Peter Joseph
- Quetzal (band)
- Qween Jean
- Reverend Billy and the Church of Stop Shopping
- Rap Against Dictatorship
- Sabo
- Saul Williams
- Self Help Graphics & Art
- Tania Bruguera
- Tinkebell
- Valie Export
- Walela Nehanda
- Parimah Avani
- Weapons of Mass Creation
- Will St Leger
- Chaiamorn Kaewwiboonpan

== Collectives and organizations ==
Artivists often work in interdisciplinary collectives that are stand-alone' or operate as a creative part of the greater activist groups, such as Gran Fury of AIDS Coalition to Unleash Power (ACT UP). Other groups include:

- Artivist Film Festival
- Crass
- Da! collective
- The Fearless Collective
- Gran Fury
- Guerrilla Girls
- Riky Rick Foundation for the Promotion of Artivism
- Sol Collective
- The Yes Men

== See also ==
- The arts and politics
- Graffiti
- Hacktivism
- Invisible theater
- Satire
- Social center
- Timeline of Extinction Rebellion actions
- Whirl-Mart
- Brooklyn Immersionists
