= Alexander Williams (cartoonist) =

English cartoonist and animator (born 1967)

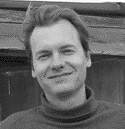
- Born: 18 October 1967 (age 59); London, England
- Education: Westminster School
- Alma mater: Merton College, Oxford
- Known for: Animation, cartoons
- Notable work: Queen's Counsel
- Father: Richard Williams
- Website: Alex Williams Animation

Alexander Steuart Williams (born 18 October 1967) is an English cartoonist and animator. He is the eldest son of animator Richard Williams. He has worked on many animated films, and is the author of the satirical King's Counsel cartoon strip in The Times, for which he won the Cartoon Art Trust Award for Strip Cartooning in October 2017. Williams is Dean of Animation and Visual Effects at Escape Studios in London.

== Early life ==
Williams was born in London in 1967, the son of Canadian animator Richard Williams. He played the voice of Tiny Tim in his father's 1971 television adaptation of A Christmas Carol. He was educated at Westminster School, Camberwell School of Arts and Crafts, and Merton College, Oxford.

== Career ==
In 1987 Williams was 20 years old and in his first year of studies at the University of Oxford when he started work as an in-betweener on Who Framed Roger Rabbit, working under animator Simon Wells and later as an assistant animator to Marc Gordon-Bates. Williams initially worked unpaid as an intern, and was later invited by producer Patsy de Lord to work on the film full-time. The university agreed to his taking a suspension of studies for a year. The following year, in 1988, he joined the Disney-MGM Studio in Orlando, Florida, working on the short film RollerCoaster Rabbit.

=== Cartoons ===
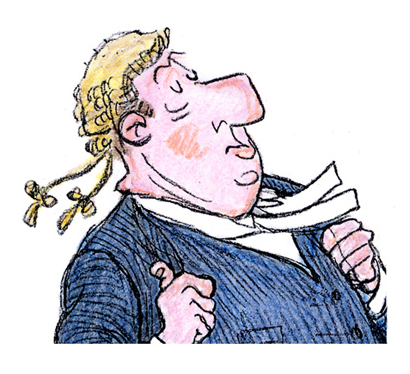
Sir Geoffrey Bentwood QC, one of the King's Counsel characters

In 1993 Williams and Graham Francis Defries created the comic strip King's Counsel, a satire on law and lawyers, published in the law pages of The Times newspaper, under the pseudonyms Steuart and Francis. At the time, Williams and Defries were working as research assistants for Members of Parliament at the House of Commons.

A number of collections of the cartoons have been published by Robson Books and HarperCollins.

Williams also drew Writer's Block, a cartoon strip published in the books section of The Times from 2005–6, and The Dealers, published in The Tatler from 1994–95. He also illustrated the characters for the Baby Barista blog by fellow ex-barrister Tim Kevan.

Williams is a trustee of the Cartoon Museum in London.

=== Animation ===
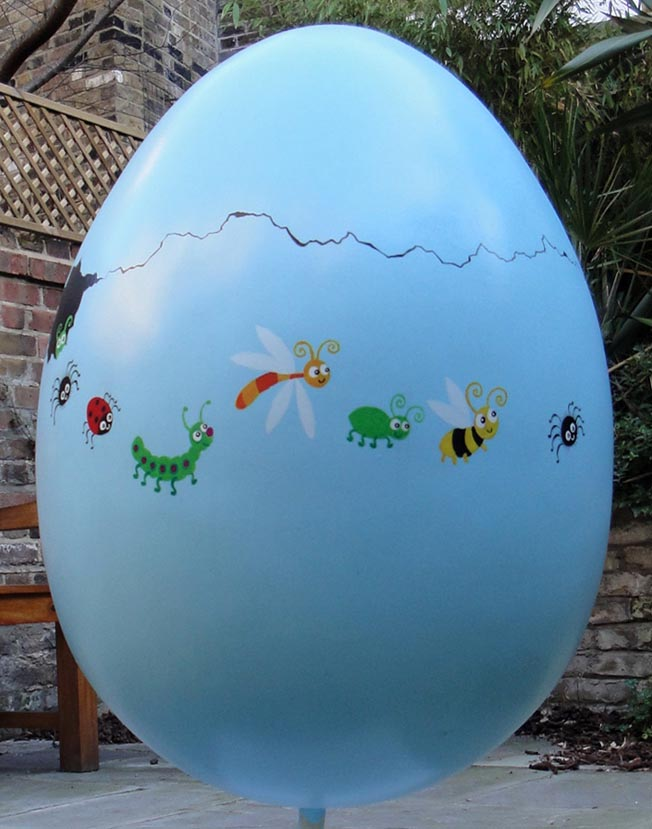
Design by Williams for The Big Egg Hunt.

Williams was a barrister at 12 King's Bench Walk Chambers in London before leaving in 1996 to pursue a full-time career in film animation, joining Warner Bros Feature Animation, where he was lead animator on the villain "Ruber", voiced by Gary Oldman, in Quest for Camelot. Williams gave the character a "nervous twitch", a "wrestler's strut" and "big hands with broken nails that look creepy on close-ups".

His work as an animator includes Who Framed Roger Rabbit (1988), The Princess and the Cobbler (1993), The Lion King (1994), Quest for Camelot (1998), The Iron Giant (1999), The Road to El Dorado (2000), Spirit: Stallion of the Cimarron (2002), Piglet's Big Movie, Sinbad: Legend of the Seven Seas (2003), Robots (2005) and Open Season (2006).

Williams has also worked on visual effects in Racing Stripes (2005), Monster House (2006), Underdog (2007), Beverly Hills Chihuahua, Inkheart (2008), Harry Potter and the Half-Blood Prince (2009), Marmaduke (2010) and The Chronicles of Narnia: The Voyage of the Dawn Treader (2010)

He has contributed designs to Deckchair Dreams, a fundraising event organised by the Royal Parks Foundation in support of the London Royal Parks. In 2012 he contributed a design for The Big Egg Hunt, a charity fundraiser billed as the world's largest ever Easter egg hunt.

=== Teaching ===
He lives in London and teaches at various academies and studios including Escape Studios, and tutors animation at Bucks New University in High Wycombe as a senior lecturer.

Williams has also founded the world's first online based MA in animation at Buckinghamshire New University, beginning in September 2015.

In 2012 he founded an online animation school, Animation Apprentice.

== Filmography ==
Year	Title	Credits
1988	Who Framed Roger Rabbit	Assistant Animator
1989	Rollercoaster Rabbit	Animator
1992	The Thief and the Cobbler	Animator
1994	The Lion King	Animator
1995	Pocahontas (1995 film)	Animator (uncredited)
1998	Quest For Camelot	Lead Animator ("Ruber")
1999	The Iron Giant	Animator
2000	The Road to El Dorado	Animator
2002	Spirit: Stallion of the Cimarron	Lead Animator
2003	Piglet's Big Movie	Animator
2003	Looney Tunes: Back in Action	Animator
2003	Sinbad: Legend of the Seven Seas	Animator
2005	Robots (2005 film)	Animator
2005	Racing Stripes	Animation Supervisor
2006	Open Season (2006 film)	Animator
2006	Monster House (film)	Animator
2007	Underdog (2007 film)	Animation Supervisor (Cinesite)
2008	Beverly Hills Chihuahua	Animation Supervisor (Cinesite)
2009	Harry Potter and the Half Blood Prince (film)	Animator (Cinesite)
2010	The Chronicles of Narnia: The Voyage of the Dawn Treader	Animator (MPC)
2010	Marmaduke	Animation Supervisor (Cinesite)

== Published work ==
- Queen's Counsel – A Libellous Look at The law, Robson Books, 1995
- Queen's Counsel – Judgment Day, Robson Books, 1996
- Queen's Counsel – Laying Down the Law, Times Books, 1997
- The Times – Best of Queen's Counsel, Times Books, 1999
- Lawyers Uncovered – Everything you always wanted to know but didn't want to pay £500 an hour to find out, JR Books, 2007
- 101 Ways to Leave the Law, JR Books, September 2009
- 101 Uses for a Useless Banker. JR books, September 2009
- The Queen's Counsel Official Lawyers' Handbook, Robson Press October 2011
- The Queen's Counsel Lawyer's Omnibus, Law Brief Publishing, 1 October 2013
- For a Few Guineas More - The Legal Year in Cartoons, Law Brief Publishing, 13 December 2019
