= Into Light Project =

Into Light Project is an American non-profit organization founded in 2019 by Theresa Clower and focused on destigmatizing drug addiction.

The main initiative of the non-profit is to organize portraits exhibitions of people who died of substance use disorder, with the aim to organize one in every state. The organization partners with local artists to make black and white portraits, shown alongside a biography of the person depicted. Artists work with local families who volunteered for the project.

The exhibitions are described as a grieving and cathartic process for families and as an example of art activism that fosters social change. The exhibitions are often held in college towns. They are accompanied educational programming to improve the general public's understanding of addiction.

The idea for the project comes from a portrait that Theresa Cower made of her son after he overdosed in 2018, that helped her grieve.
