= Queens Council =

Queens Council may be:

- Queen's Counsel - are jurists appointed by letters patent to be one of Her Majesty's Counsel learned in the law
- Queens Borough Council
- The Times cartoon satire Queens Counsel
