= Pearson College =

Pearson College may refer to:

- Pearson College (UK) in London and Manchester, United Kingdom
- Pearson College UWC, a United World College, located in Victoria, British Columbia, Canada

== See also ==
- Pierson College, a residential college of Yale University
