= Elephant Parade =

Art exhibition

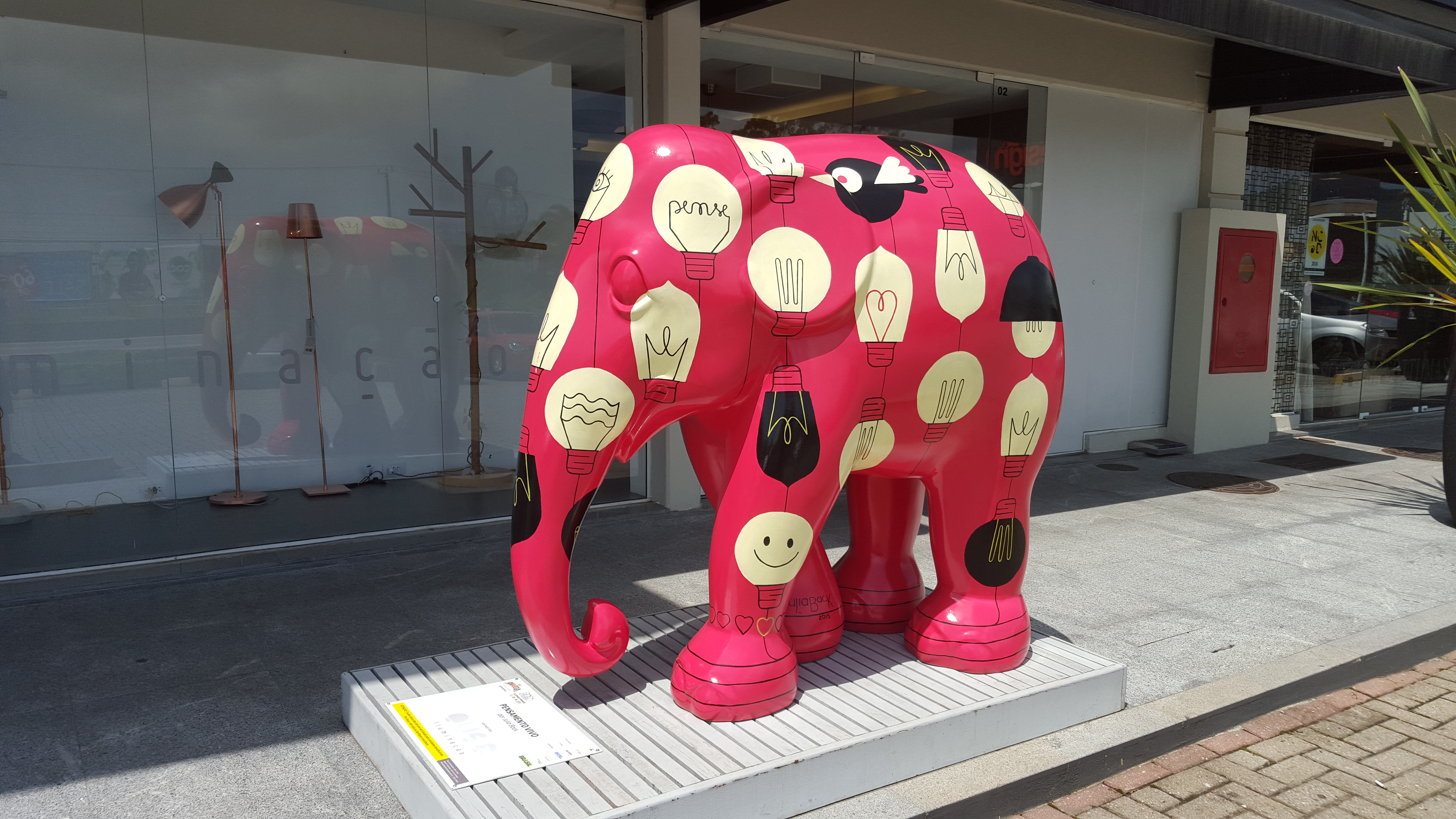
An elephant statue on public display in Florianópolis

Elephant Parade (registered as Elephant Parade BV) is an open-air exhibition dedicated to saving the Asian elephant from extinction. For one or more months, hundreds of painted elephant sculptures specially created by artists are placed in the streets of one or more host cities to increase public awareness of the plight of the elephant and gain support for Asian elephant conservation. They are then auctioned off, with the proceeds going to the Elephant Family organisation.

== History ==
The event was created in 2006 by Marc Spits and his son Mike. It was inspired by Marc Spits' visit (while logging in Myanmar) to the elephant hospital in Thailand, which constructs prosthetic legs for elephants that encounter landmines. There he saw Mosha, a baby elephant who lost her foot when only seven months old. Mosha was the first elephant to receive a prosthetic limb. She is fitted with a new leg every year, and must then learn to walk all over again. The documentary film The Eyes of Thailand (narrated by Ashley Judd) shows the work of Mosha's caregiver, Soraida Salwala.

The first Elephant Parade was held in Rotterdam in 2007. Antwerp followed in 2008. In 2009, Elephant Parade visited Amsterdam. In 2010, Elephant Parades were held in Emmen and London. In 2011, they were held in Heerlen, Copenhagen, Milan, Singapore and Hasselt; they were later held in Trier, Luxembourg and Dana Point, California in 2013. In 2014, Elephant Parade visited the UK (during a national tour) and Hong Kong, followed by Calais, Suzhou, Bangkok and Florianópolis in 2015. In 2016, Elephant Parade came to Taiwan and celebrated its 10th anniversary in Chiang Mai, Thailand. Elephant Parade returned to the Netherlands in 2017 and held another anniversary parade in Laren. Expositions were also held in São Paulo in 2017 and in India in 2017/2018.

The elephant sculptures in the Elephant Parade are all unique works donated by the artists, who include both established and emerging unknowns and celebrities. They are exhibited in the streets of the host city for one or more months and then auctioned off (by a well-known auction house such as Christie's or Sotheby's), with the proceeds going to Elephant Family and the Friends of the Asian Elephant Hospital, home of Mosha, in Lampang, which seeks to save the Asian elephant and return it to its natural habitat. The sculptures are 150 centimetres (59 in) tall. Limited-edition miniatures are also made of most, varying in size between 5 and 75 centimetres (2.0 and 29.5 in); these are hand-painted in Thailand and sold on the Elephant Parade website, with the proceeds from all online sales associated with the Elephant Parade also going to Elephant Family and FAE. Money raised through Elephant Parade has been used to support projects from elephant medical care to leasing land where elephants have sufficient space to migrate, breed and live in peace.

=== Elephant Parade Amsterdam ===
In 2009, over 100 art elephants participated in Elephant Parade Amsterdam, created by artists including Jan des Bouvrie, Henk Schiffmacher, Menno Baars, Ilse DeLange, Corneille, Rob Scholte, Raymond Hoogendorp and Daryl van Wouw. The elephants were auctioned by Christie's in November 2009. The best-selling elephant was by Corneille, a well known Dutch painter of the COBRA group, and was sold for €42,000. The BaarsFant by Menno Baars was sold for €30,000. Only a few weeks after the auction, Baars designed a second elephant, named BabyBelly. This time, however, he painted the elephant during a live session at the Kalvertoren, a shopping mall in the Kalverstraat, a famous shopping street in Amsterdam. BabyBelly is a smaller art elephant and is pregnant, depicting the conservation of its species.

=== Elephant Parade London ===
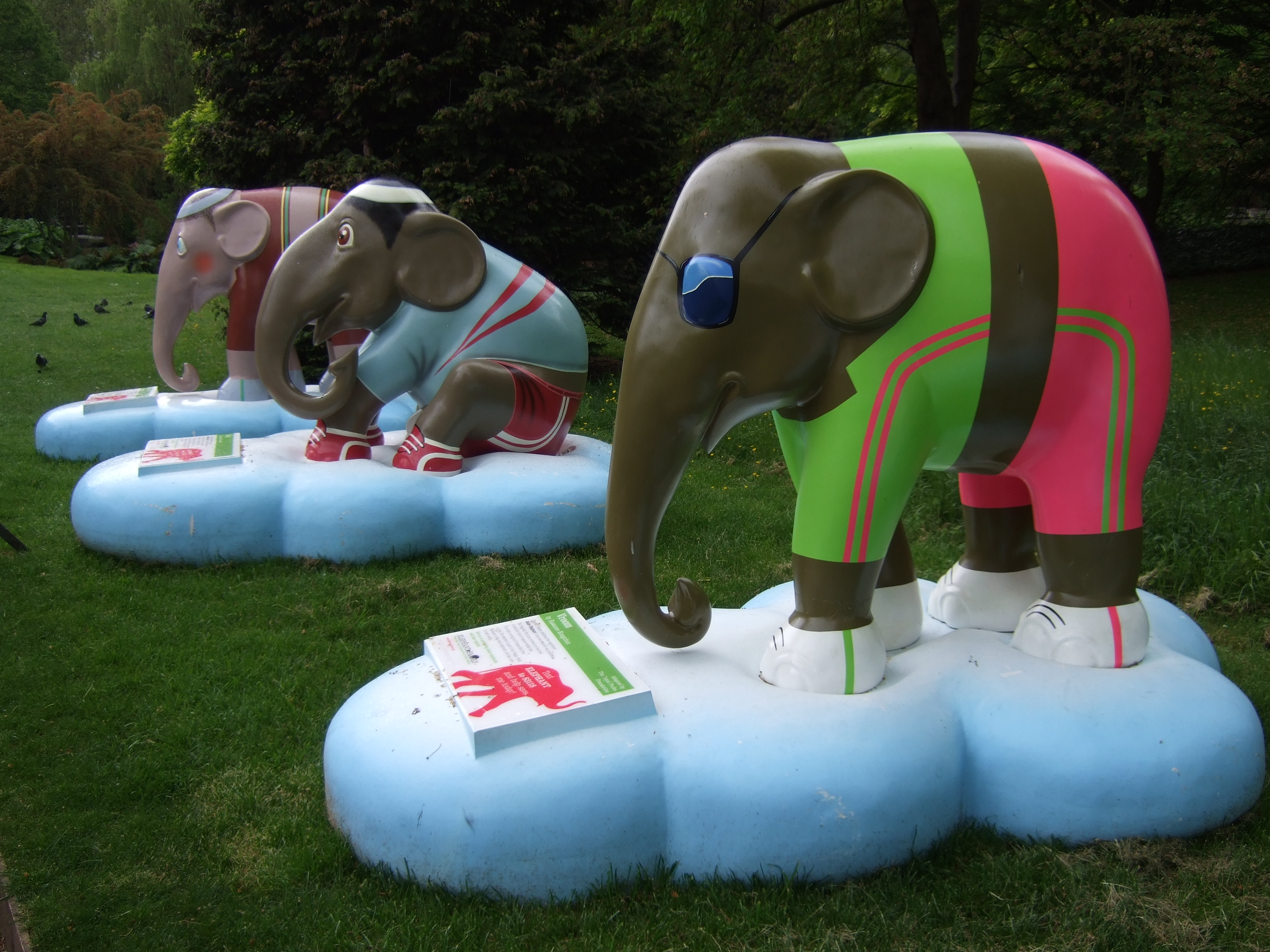
The Elephant Parade in Hyde Park 2010

In 2010, UK conservation charity Elephant Family executed the exhibition. Over 250 art elephants were designed for the London exhibition by Tommy Hilfiger, Graeme Le Saux, Lulu Guinness, Martin Aveling, Diane von Furstenberg and others. The elephants were transported by Eco Movers over the course of the parade, up to the celebrity auction held in June 2010. The auction raised over £4 million ($7,150,000). Marc Quinn’s elephant would be sold to Amanda Eliasch while the elephant created by Jack Vettriano attracted the highest bid, £155,000 ($252,600).

=== Elephant Parade Emmen Zoo ===
Also in 2010, Elephant Parade visited Emmen, in the northeastern Netherlands, for the 75th anniversary of the Emmen Zoo. From Ascension Day, 13 May, until the end of August, 75 art elephants were exhibited in the centre of the town and in the zoo itself. Most were created by artists from the region. The auction, held by Christie's, was at the Eden Hotel in Emmen on 9 September 2010. The best-selling elephant was again by Corneille, and was sold for €68,000 ($98,188). By a sad coincidence, Corneille had died only three days earlier.

=== Elephant Parade Tour Bergen ===
In Bergen, Netherlands, the first Elephant Parade Tour was organized. 65 smaller, 75-centimetre (30 in) elephants were exhibited in the windows of shops and galleries in the centre of the town beginning on 22 August and then auctioned by Christie's on 30 October. €127,000 ($181,600) was raised. On the last day of the exhibition, it was announced that the town council had acquired an art elephant by George Jurriaens to be placed at the local Museum Kranenburgh. Elephants from previous Elephant Parades had been temporarily placed in museums such as the Natural History Museum in London, but Bergen's was the first to acquire a position in the permanent collection of a museum.

=== Elephant Parade 2011 ===
In 2011, Elephant Parade elephants swarmed the streets of four cities. The first Elephant Parade that year was in Heerlen, from 25 March through 25 May, organized by Stichting Vrouwen laten Heerlen Glimlachen (Foundation Women Put a Smile on Heerlen) and exhibited 40 art elephants. The auction was held on 28 May 2011. Elephant Parades were also held in Copenhagen (1 June – 25 August 2011, 102 elephants), in Milan (16 September – 15 November 2011) and in Singapore (11 November 2011 – January 2012).

=== Elephant Parade 2012 ===
In 2012, the Elephant Parade was held in Hasselt, Belgium from 1 September to 1 November.

=== Elephant Parade 2013: Trier and Luxembourg ===
From 18 July to 18 October 2013, 40 elephants were on display in Trier as well as 55 in Luxembourg, marking the first time cities in Germany and Luxembourg have hosted the Elephant Parade.

=== Elephant Parade: Welcome to America ===
Also in 2013, for the first time on American soil, dozens of life-size baby elephant sculptures were on display in the Orange County, California seaside city of Dana Point. Elephant Parade USA Ambassador Dana Yarger appeared on a local Los Angeles news station in May 2013 to advertise the event. Since Dana Point is only 60 miles (97 km) south of Hollywood, actors and artists (including Khloé Kardashian, Lily Tomlin, Loree Rodkin, Phyllis Stuart, Li Bingbing and other entertainment industry personalities) were participating designers.

=== Elephant Parade 2014: Hong Kong ===
In 2014, Elephant Parade came to Hong Kong where it had over 100 statues on display. The auction raised approximately $277,398 which was donated to the Asian Elephant Foundation, whose conservation efforts range from funding hospitals to lobbying governments.

=== Elephant Parade 2015: Florianópolis ===
In December 2015, for the first time in Brazil, Elephant Parade was held in Florianópolis until March 2016. The sculptures were placed around the city (both on the island and mainland sides).

=== Elephant Parade 2017: São Paulo ===
In June 2017, Elephant Parade was held in São Paulo. Around 85 sculptures were created and placed in public places around the city, making the Parade the largest art exhibition in the city's history.

=== Elephant Parade 2018: Rio de Janeiro ===
From August to November 2018, Elephant Parade was held in Rio de Janeiro. The concept of the event was "Colorir o Rio é a Parada."

== Supporters ==
Supporters of Elephant Parade include Boris Johnson (former mayor of London), Sarah, Duchess of York, Sir Evelyn de Rothschild, Goldie Hawn, Khloe Kardashian, Katy Perry, Tommy Hilfiger, Isaac Mizrahi, Lucy Fleming, jewellery designer Loree Rodkin, Diane von Fürstenberg, Paul Sorvino, Ilse DeLange, Jan Mol, Joanna Lumley, Job Cohen (former mayor of Amsterdam), Jonnie Boer, Michael Palin, Rob de Nijs, and Prince Henrik of Denmark, who also created an elephant for Elephant Parade Copenhagen.

== See also ==
- The Big Egg Hunt, a 2012 charity event that also raised money for elephants
- CowParade, the first such international exhibition of animal sculptures
