= Pamina Sebastião =

Angolan feminist artivist

- Born: January 31, 1988 (age 38); Luanda, Angola
- Other name: Paula Sebastião
- Education: Master's degree (International Law and Relations)
- Occupations: Artist, activist, lawyer
- Awards: Prince Claus Award

Pamina Sebastião, also called Paula Sebastião, (born in Luanda, January 31, 1988) is a non-binary person from Angola who is dedicated to multidisciplinary visual artivism. Their award-winning work involves writing, audiovisual pieces, photography, and collages from a decolonial and socio-imaginative perspective. Along with being an artist, Sebastião also has a legal background and a master's degree in International Law and Relations.

== Biography ==
Sebastião has a legal background; they earned a master's degree in International Law and Relations from the University of Lisbon in Portugal. They had various shift work jobs before they decided to restructure their career to prioritize life over work.

=== Social movement ===
They cofounded the LGBTQI feminist collective Archive of Angolan Identity (Arquivo de Identidade Angolano in Portuguese, abbreviated as AIA). Along with Jaliya The Bird, they cofounded WikiLuanda, a collective of Wikipedia editors. Sebastião was part of the feminist collective Ondjango and project LINKAGES Angola. She participated in the seventh episode of GALA Queer Archive's project Archives of the Intimate.

=== Artistic research ===
Their research contributes to collective reflections about colonial trauma and the way decolonization can be a path to not only dismantle the body as a site of inscription, but also to propose new places of care. It explores the construction an imaginary in which forms of existence other than corporeal are possible. Their work also serves as an artistic avenue for exploring queer experiences.

In 2022, along with Jamil Parasol, they founded the Break Center in the bar Chicala II in Luanda. Break is a free art center where they host workshops and form new generations of artists with a social perspective.

=== Awards ===
They received an award from the Prince Claus Fund for their work on matters of racial justice, gender equality, and queer expression within the disciplines of artistic research, performance, and visual arts.

== Personal life ==
Sebastião uses they and them pronouns. She strongly enjoys literature. When asked in an interview what she would save from a hypothetical house fire if she could choose one thing, she responded, "I would take books. I would take, All About Love by Bell Hooks. [Also] Contrasexual Manifesto by Paul B. Preciado."
