= Daniel Arzola =

Venezuelan artist, LGBT rights activist

- Born: Daniel Alexander Arzola; May 6, 1989 (age 37); Maracay, Venezuela
- Occupations: Artist, writer
- Known for: LGBT activism, digital art
- Notable work: No Soy Tu Chiste; Be True To You

Daniel Alexander Arzola (born May 6, 1989) is a Venezuelan writer, visual artist, graphic designer and human rights defender. He (Note: Arzola uses he/him, she/her and they/them pronouns in English. For consistency, this article uses he/him.) is most well known for being the creator of No Soy Tu Chiste (In English, "I Am Not Your Joke"), a series of fifty posters that became the first Venezuelan LGBT campaign to go viral globally in 2013. He refers to his use of artwork for activism as "Artivism."

== Personal life ==
Arzola was born in Maracay, Venezuela on May 6, 1989. Arzola is gay and non-binary and uses he/him, she/her, and they/them pronouns in English.

Arzola studied graphic design at the Pascal University Institute of Technology and the Maracay drama school.

He was diagnosed with Asperger syndrome at the age of 18, and has been open about his condition in his art.

Arzola currently works at the Boynton Health's Marketing and Communication department at the University of Minnesota in the United States. He teaches about Artivism at universities in the United States, Chile, Argentina, and around the world. Due to harassment and death threats after his art received global attention, he was forced to flee Venezuela and live internationally.

== Efebos ==
Between 2011 and 2012, Arzola exhibited Efebos, a multimedia artwork that tried to reimagine the male image through thirty portraits of men between sixteen and twenty-two years old. Efebos was exhibited at several different artistic spaces in the city of Maracay, including the museum of history and anthropology, where Arzola received a special mention for being the youngest person to have an individual exhibit in that space. Efebos is an exhibition that mixes photography with poetry, both made by Arzola.

== No Soy Tu Chiste ==
Arzola created No Soy Tu Chiste (In English, "I Am Not Your Joke") in 2013 as an online campaign based on his own illustrations of well-known LGBT figures and characters alongside empowering messages. The campaign addressed issues of abuse, mockery, and violence towards people over their differences, and specifically for reasons of gender or sexual orientation, calling for acceptance and an end to homophobia. No Soy Tu Chiste went viral around the world and had been translated from Spanish into twenty different languages.

On January 31, 2014, Arzola received an honorary award from the Canadian embassy in Venezuela for his artistic work in support of human rights. In March 2014, No Soy Tu Chiste partnered with the It Gets Better Project to create seven new posters in support of LGBT youth around the world, in twenty languages.

Five pieces from Arzola's project were selected by Katy Perry to be a part of Madonna's Art for Freedom initiative.

Despite the international acclaim that this project brought him, Arzola faced considerable backlash and harassment within Venezuela and was forced to flee to the Netherlands.

== Artivism ==
In addition to the global impact of the series No Soy Tu Chiste, Arzola's work has been a symbol of social causes in Colombia and Argentina. After homophobic harassment by teachers caused the suicide of Colombian student Sergio Urrego in 2014, Arzola spoke out again homophobia. He paid tribute to Sergio Urrego by illustrating a portrait of him alongside the phrase, "Ignoring abuse makes us violent." Days before his suicide, Urrego had shared a poster from No Soy Tu Chiste on his Facebook profile, which featured the quote, "My sexuality is not a sin, it is my own paradise." Both works became symbols of the fight against homophobia in Colombia.

In Argentina, in July 2016, a bill was presented to rename a recent subway station in Buenos Aires after renowned LGBT activist Carlos Jáuregui. To support the cause, Arzola illustrated a portrait of Jáuregui to promote the campaign. It gained much attention from the public in Argentina and various public figures, including the Nobel Peace Prize winner Adolfo Pérez Esquivel. On March 20, 2017, Arzola exhibited a fourteen-meter mural at newly named Carlos Jáuregui station, including a portrait of the pride flag on the stairs to the station and six illustrations on the balconies. This was Arzola's first permanent exhibition.

== Awards and nominations ==
- Youngest person to exhibit in the museum facilities. Museum of history and anthropology of Maracay. – 2012
- Honorable Mention Human Rights Award from the Canadian Embassy. – 2013.
- Madonna's Art For Freedom Official Selection . – 2013–2014.
- 7 talented young Venezuelans. Tendencia Magazine, 2014.
- Winner of the United Nations Population Fund Super Youth contest, 2014.
- Representative of Latin America at Amsterdam Pride Event. Radio Netherlands Worldwide, 2014.
- Winner of the short essay contest of the United States Embassy in Venezuela, 2014.
- LGBT activism award, Affirmative Union 2015.
- Winner of the Human Rights Award at the International Queer and Migrant Film Festival in Amsterdam 2016.
- Winner of Logo Trailblazers Honors from Logo (television channel)
