= Cripple Creek Theatre Company =

Non-profit theatre company in New Orleans

The Cripple Creek Theatre Company is a grassroots, non-profit theatre company in New Orleans, Louisiana, United States, known for producing productions with large, diverse casts. The company was founded in December 2005 by Andrew Kingsley and Andrew Vaught for the purpose of instigating action toward social and economic justice in the South. The founders both attended Kenyon College in Gambier, Ohio, where they studied American history and theater. The theatre has been identified a driving force in the recovering city.

== Productions ==
In March 2007, the theatre produced The Green, Gold and Purple Shuffle a satire of Louisiana politics featuring former governor Edwin Edwards and klansman David Duke. The production, performed in Washington Park in the Marigny, employed the device of invisible theatre. The City of New Orleans refused access to the Moon Walk adjacent Jackson Square because of the controversial subject matter.

Bury the Dead, an anti-war zombie play. The production was nominated for three Ambie Awards, including best drama. Andrew Vaught was nominated for best direction and Andrew Kingsley for best lighting design.

The company's production of the Inspector General by Nikolai Gogol and adapted by Andrew Kingsley was taped by CNN. The play coincided with the establishment of the City of New Orleans' Office of the Inspector General. Robert A. Cerasoli addressed the audience following many performances.

The theatre was asked to restage its inaugural production, Tennessee Williams' 'Kingdom of Earth' at the Tennessee Williams Festival in the spring of 2009.

== Programs ==
The company also runs the Louisiana Stage Writers' Workshop which encourages playwright development in New Orleans.
