= Escape Studios =

Animation and visual effects school in London, England

- Founder: Dominic Davenport
- Established: 2002
- Address: 6 Mitre Passage, North Greenwich, London, SE10 0ER
- Location: North Greenwich, London, United Kingdom
- Website: www.escapestudios.ac.uk

Escape Studios is one of the UK's animation, games and VFX schools training professionals and students in the creative industries. Its main campus is situated in North Greenwich, London, offering short courses and degrees at undergraduate and postgraduate level. Escape Studios' primary offering includes study programmes in Visual Effects (VFX), Game Art, Game Design, Concept Art, Programming, Animation, Motion Graphics and Technical Art..

== History ==
Escape Studios was founded in April 2002 by Dominic Davenport and James Huggins as an independent visual effects academy; initially based in Notting Hill, and later in Shepherd's Bush, London, offering short courses in Visual Effects (VFX), Games, Animation and later Motion Graphics. The goal was to become "Europe's top VFX school". In 2010 Davenport described Escape Studios as a "finishing school for the visual effects industry in this country", often taking students with an existing undergraduate degree and helping them to break into the industry.

In 2010, Escape Studios starting offering postgraduate degrees in Visual Effects Production with two pathways, one specialising in 3D and one in compositing.

In 2011 general manager Mark Cass explained in an interview with the BBC that demand for trained VFX talent was such that "we literally cannot train people quick enough to get out the door", and that the philosophy of Escape Studios is "recreate, as far as possible, the work environment that its graduates will hopefully enter".

In 2012 Escape Studios attempted to break into the United States setting up a training campus in LA but closed shortly after. Shortly after Escape Studios closed operations in LA it spun off its software re-selling business, creating a new company, Escape Technology, "targeting the media industry", allowing Escape Studios to "concentrate fully on the continued growth of its classroom and online academies and recruitment services".

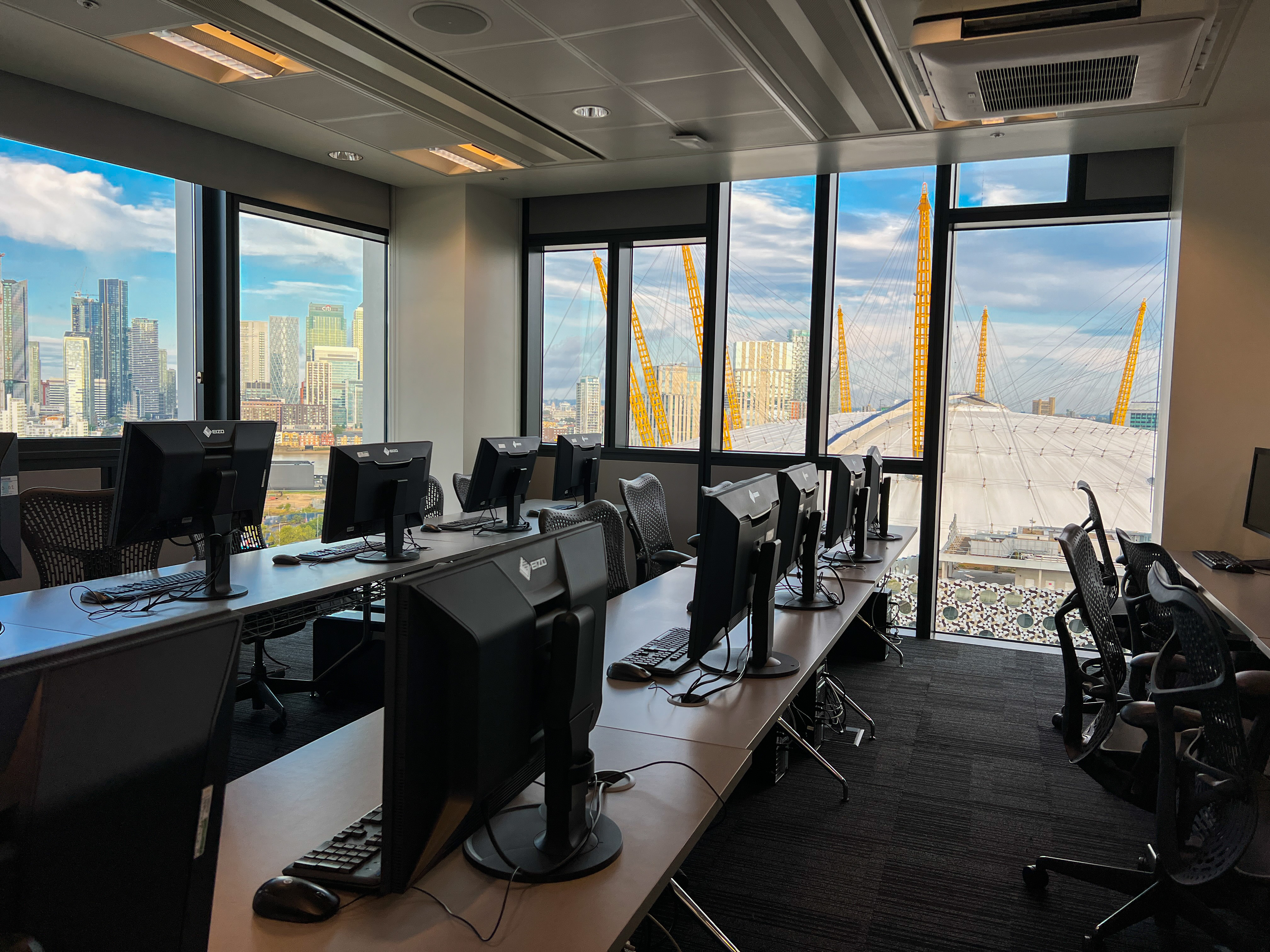
Studio space at Escape Studios with a view of surrounding North Greenwich location.

In October 2013 Escape Studios was acquired by Pearson plc, and from September 2016 it began offering undergraduate degrees as a subsidiary of Pearson College London.

Escape Studios tutors are required to have worked in industry with many work between education and the creative industries. Animator, Alexander Williams., is the Director of Animation and Visual Effects at Escape Studios.

In June 2023 Escape Studios was acquired by AAP Education Limited, a new partnership between Sterling Partners and Coventry University. AAP Education is committed to maintaining high quality student experiences and outcomes and to creating a sustainable and exciting future. The trading name remains as Escape Studios.

In April 2024, Escape Studios received its UKVI licence and therefore welcomes aspiring talent and creatives from around the globe. Receiving the UKVI licence allows the institution to sponsor international students to join programmes on a student visa.

== Industry Partnerships ==
Industry partners include Atomhawk, Bild Studios, Black Kite, BlueBolt, Blue Zoo, Boulder Media, Cinesite, Climax, Creative Assembly, DBLG, DNEG, DNEG Animation, Electric Square, Electric Theatre Collective, Epic Games, Framestore, Fudge Animation, Goodbye Kansas, ILM, Milk, Outpost VFX, Passion Pictures, Peerless, Pixomondo, Playground Games, Rise, Rebellion, State of Play, The Boundary,The Third Floor, Time Based Arts, Territory Studio and Union VFX. In 2012 Escape Studios launched the first VFX Festival in London, in partnership with MPC, Framestore and Cinesite. which was reimagined into Escapeverse Live in 2025. Escapeverse Live is free festival of online events showcasing projects and talent across the VFX, Games, Animation and Technology industries.

Escape Studios participates in the National Saturday Club, an outreach program that aims to help students from diverse backgrounds gain access to the creative industries. It also co-operates with ScreenSkills to offer courses aimed at under-represented groups such as women and minorities.

In 2025 Escape Studios announced a new undergraduate degree in comics and visual storytelling developed in collaboration with Comic Book UK. Escape Studios develops all of its programmes with industry input using a unique Degree Concept Team approach which brings together academics, industry and students to develop and review programmes to ensure they are aligned to the skilled needed in the workplace.

== Awards ==
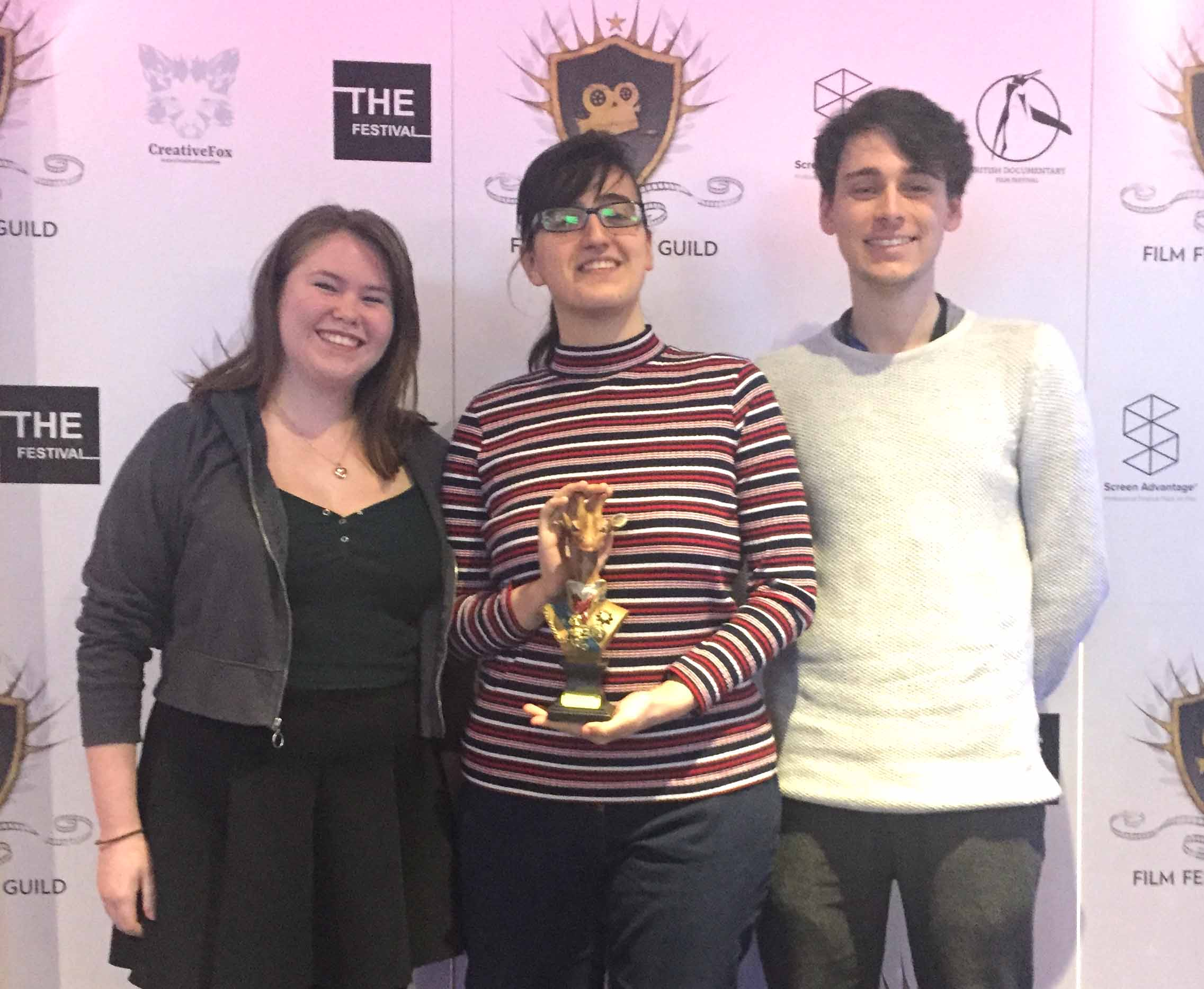
Best Student Animation Winners at the British Animation Film Festival 2019

Students from Escape Studios have won a number of awards. The short film Home Sweet Home, directed by Maria Robertson, won Best Student Animation at the 2019 British Animation Film Festival. The short film Jericho was short-listed for a student BAFTA in 2019.
