= Xerjoff =

Italian fragrance company

- Industry: Fragrance
- Founded: 2007; 19 years ago in Turin, Italy
- Founders: Sergio Momo; Dominique Salvo
- Headquarters: Turin, Italy
- Key people: Sergio Momo (CEO and creative director)
- Website: Official website

Xerjoff is an Italian fragrance company from Turin founded in 2007 by Sergio Momo and Dominique Salvo.

== History ==
Xerjoff was founded in Turin in 2007 by Sergio Momo and Dominique Salvo. The name comes from "Joff", a nickname for Momo from his Slavic grandmother, which was extended to "Sir Joff" by English colleagues. Momo, a former painter and designer, studied perfumery in Grasse in 2005. Andrea Tessitore became the company's president in July 2018. As of 2019, the brand's "commercial heart" is in London, where it generates one fifth of its revenue.

In 2009, Xerjoff acquired the rights to Casamorati, a historic Italian perfume house founded in Bologna in 1888, and revived the brand after its perfumes had been absent from the market for more than 60 years. The revival retained Casamorati's original bottle design and logo.

Some of Xerjoff's perfumes have been created with various partners. Save Me was announced in January 2021 for Brian May's Save Me Trust as part of Xerjoff's charity fundraising collection Spray to Help. Scent of Dark was released with Tony Iommi alongside a song of the same name in November 2021. In 2025 they collaborated with Duran Duran, releasing two fragrances. Xerjoff has sponsored the ATP Finals since the tournament moved to Turin in 2021, releasing tennis-inspired scents each year.
