= Lynnette Haozous =

Native American artist

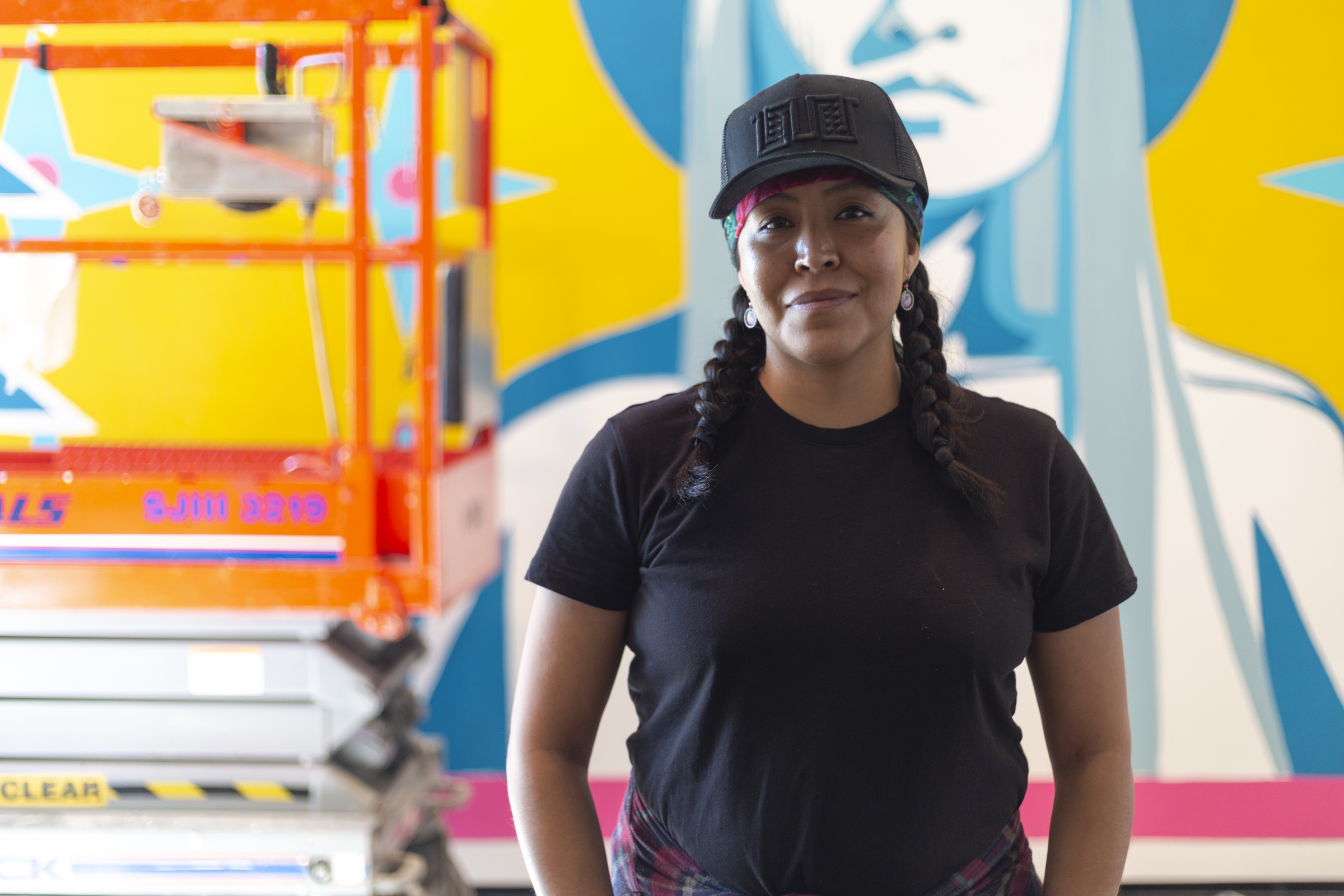
- Haozous in 2021
- Born: 1985 (age 40–41)
- Citizenship: San Carlos Apache Tribe, United States
- Education: New Mexico Highlands University, Central New Mexico Community College
- Known for: Murals, Painting, Mixed Media
- Style: Artivism, Art of the American Southwest
- Website: www.lynnettehaozous.com

Lynnette Haozous (born 1985) is a Native American painter, printmaker, jeweler, writer, and actor. She is an enrolled member of the San Carlos Apache Tribe and of Chiricahua Apache, Navajo, and Taos Pueblo ancestry. Haozous works in acrylics, watercolors, spray paint, jewelry, screen-printing, writing, and acting on stage and in film. She is known for her murals and uses a blend of art and advocacy to bring attention to social conditions and injustices.

== Biography ==
Lynnette Haozous is of Chiricahua Apache, Navajo, and Taos Pueblo ancestry. She spent her childhood and adolescence in Arizona and New Mexico. Haozous has said that moving a lot and spending time with family in each of these locations helped her to develop a "profound connection to all sides of my ancestors, and each has had an influence on my work." Haozous is from an artistic family and was influenced by her great-uncle, Allan Houser, a renowned sculptor.

Haozous graduated from New Mexico Highlands University in 2016 with a bachelor's degree in social work. She also studied studio arts at Central New Mexico Community College.

== Career ==
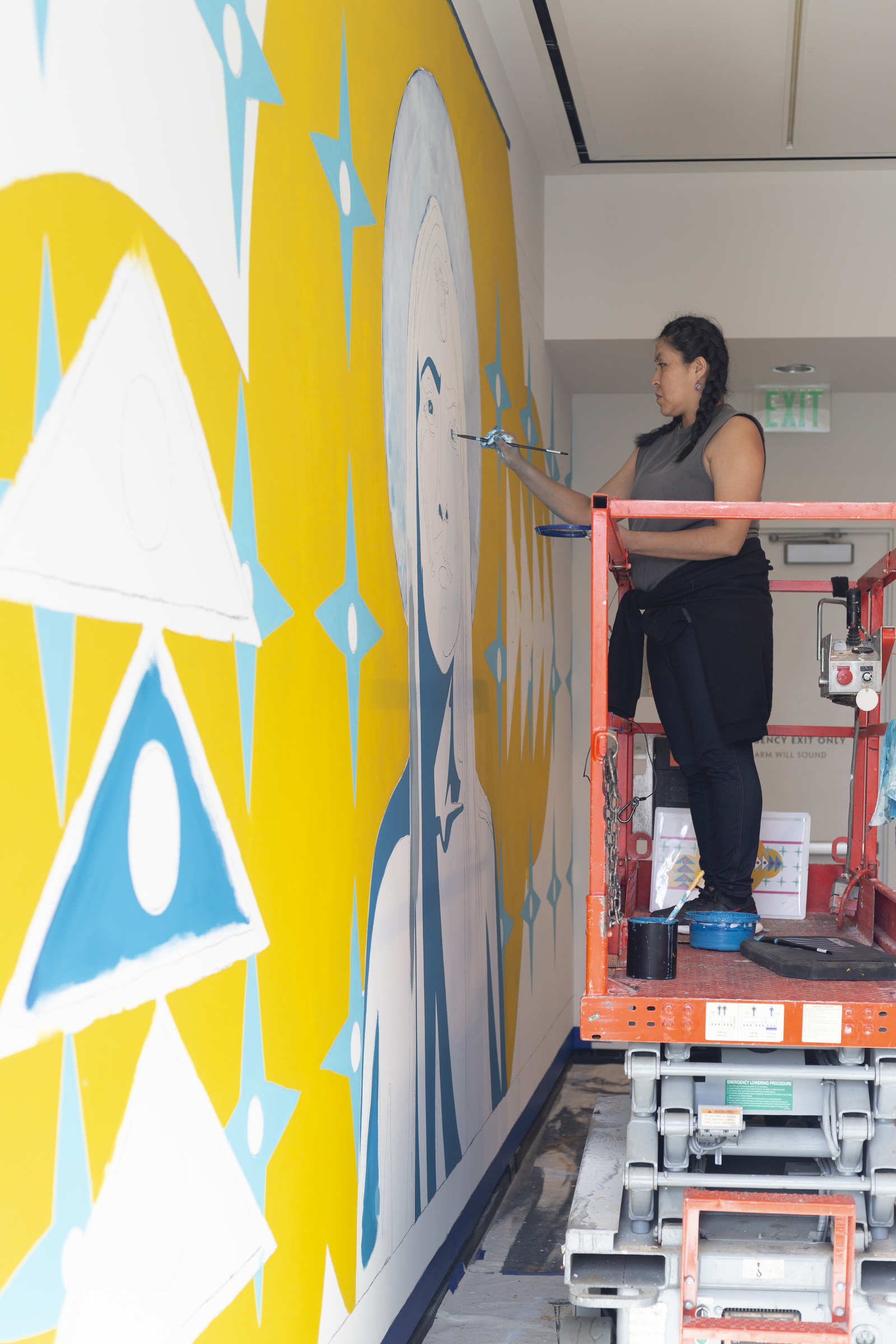
Lynnette Haozous painting Into the Sun (2021)

Lynnette Haozous is an artivist, using art for positive social change to empower and strengthen communities. She works in many mediums including painting, jewelry, screen-printing, writing, and acting, but is most well known for her murals, which use a combination of spray paint and stencils. Haozous has said, "What I like about doing murals is that they speak directly to the community; they're readily available. You can speak directly to the people about these social issues that are impacting them in their own neighborhoods and communities."

In 2020 Haozous's mixed media installation, Braiding Reconciliation, was featured in the Reconciliation exhibit at the IAIA Museum of Contemporary Native Arts (MoCNA). The exhibit was developed by Native American and Indo-Hispano artists and centered truth, racial healing, and transformation—grounded in the promise of reconciliation. The exhibit responded to a decades long journey to end La Entrada, a local annual pageant depicting the 1692 reconquest of New Mexico by the Spanish empire. Lynnette Haozous's installation used cords to represent past traumas and the future promise of reconciliation. Knots in the cords recalled those used by Pueblo runners to communicate and mark time during the successful Pueblo Revolt of 1680. At the base of Haozous's installation, rocks from communities throughout the region anchored the cords. Lynnette Haozous's first art installation outside of New Mexico was commissioned by the Portland Art Museum as part of the Mesh exhibit. The 2021 Mesh exhibit featured the work of four Native American artists whose multidisciplinary work touched on social issues including the ongoing fight against racial injustice and conflicts over Indigenous land rights. The exhibit spotlighted Native American culture and reminded viewers that art is an essential form of activism. Haozous's mural, titled Into the Sun, "re-matriates" or reasserts the presence and power of Native women in a colonial space.

In 2023 Haozous's mural Seeds of Change was selected from a call to artists to represent The Harwood Museum's 100th birthday in Taos, New Mexico. The mural measures eight feet tall and 10 feet wide and depicts a baby and three young Taos Pueblo women. Haozous said of the artwork, "I like to paint portraits of Native people in their element today, living both in the modern world, while carrying on our traditions of a thousand years."

== Works ==
=== Murals ===
Name of Mural	Exhibit	Museum	Location	Year	Other Information
Seeds of the Future	The Harwood 100	Hardwood Museum of Art	Taos, New Mexico	2023-2024	Selected to represent the 100th anniversary of The Harwood.
100% Taos County Initiative Mural	N/A	N/A	105 Camino de la Placita, Taos, New Mexico	2022 -	
Into the Sun	MESH	Portland Art Museum	Portland, Oregon	2021 - 2022	
Abolishing the Entrada	Reconciliation	IAIA Museum of Contemporary Native Arts (MoCNA)	Santa Fe, New Mexico	2019 - 2021	
Original Inhabitants	N/A	N/A	OT Circus, Albuquerque, New Mexico	2018 -	Collaboration with Joeseph Arnoux
Braiding Reconciliation Mural	N/A	The Hardwood Museum of Art of the University of New Mexico	Santa Fe, New Mexico	2018	
Artist Rooms at Nativo Lodge	N/A	N/A	Albuquerque, New Mexico	2017 -	

=== Mixed Media ===
Name of work	Exhibit	Museum	Location	Year
Braiding Reconciliation	Reconciliation	IAIA Museum of Contemporary Native Arts (MoCNA)	Santa Fe, New Mexico	2019 - 2020
Braiding Reconciliation	N/A	The Hardwood Museum of Art at the University of New Mexico	Santa Fe, New Mexico	2019

=== Google Doodle ===
On November 3, 2023, in honor of Native American Heritage Month, the Google Doodle of the day featured Allan Houser, which was illustrated by Lynnette Hoazous. The doodle included Apache stars; a yucca plant to represent the desert and homeland of Apache people; an Apache wikiup; the Sun, which is central to Apache culture; and the Three Sisters Mountain, which is one of four mountains sacred to Chiricahua/ Apache People.

=== Artist Residence ===
- 2018–2019 Santa Fe Art Institute Truth and Reconciliation Residency
- 2017 Nativo Lodge Artists Rooms Residency
- 2012 Nativo Lodge/SWAIA Artist Residency

=== Fellowship ===
- 2020 Native Arts and Culture Foundation Mentor Artist Fellowship Award

=== Awards ===
- 2023 Hardwood Museum of Art, Centennial Call to Artists, Winner for Seeds of the Future
- 2023 Southwest Contemporary, 12 New Mexico Artists to Know Now
