= Italia Independent Group =

Italian eyewear company

- Company type: S.p.A. (Public Limited Company)
- Traded as: BIT: IIG
- Industry: Holding company
- Founded: 2008
- Founder: Lapo Elkann, Andrea Tessitore, Giovanni Accongiagioco
- Defunct: 2024
- Headquarters: Turin, Italy
- Products: Eyewear and Sunglasses
- Net income: ▲€581,248 (2014)
- Total assets: ▲€47,634,619 (2014)
- Total equity: ▲€15,998,426 (2014)
- Subsidiaries: Italia Independent; Independent Ideas; Spirit Vodka; Sound Identity; Care Label; Independent Value Card
- Website: Italiaindependentgroup.com

Italia Independent Group S.p.A. is a holding corporation for an Italian company that produces and distributes eyewear and sunglasses.

== History ==
The brand Italia Independent was founded in 2007 by Lapo Elkann, Andrea Tessitore and Giovanni Accongiagioco.

The first model of sunglasses was made of carbon fiber, handmade in Italy and presented at the Pitti Uomo in Florence.

Italia Independent, the design company, is entirely owned by its holding company, Italia Independent Group. The holding company debuted in the Italian Stock Exchange in 2013.

Italia Independent launched on January 9, 2007 during Pitti Uomo. In 2008 Italia Independent was acquired by Italia Independent Group, created to manage new divisions of the company. Italia Independent Group debuted in the stock exchange in 2013. In 2009 opened the brand's first showroom in Milan with sunglasses and clothing collections. On 28 June 2013, Italia Independent Group was listed on the AIM segment of the Italian Stock Exchange, the market for smaller Italian companies, with code IIG.

== Technology ==
The company received an award from the MIT Technology Review for use thermosensitive fiber and microfiber linings.
