= Daniel R. White =

American attorney and author

- Born: August 2, 1953 (age 73); Atlanta, Georgia

Daniel R. White (born August 2, 1953, in Atlanta, Georgia) is an American attorney and author. His first book, The Official Lawyer's Handbook,, a satire of the legal profession, was a bestseller in the early 1980s. The success of the Handbook, which ranked #1 on The Washington Post bestseller list.

== Early life ==
White graduated from The Westminster Schools, a co-educational college preparatory school in Atlanta, Georgia. He obtained a B.A. in Government from Harvard College, graduating magna cum laude in 1975.

After college, he traveled to Seoul, Korea, where he wrote and edited travel articles for the Korea National Tourism Corporation, an agency of the Republic of Korea. The following year he attended Columbia Law School, where he obtained a J.D. in 1979. He served as Articles Editor of the Columbia Law Review, which published his first legal writing, "Pacifica Foundation v. FCC: 'Filthy Words,' the First Amendment, and the Broadcast Media," during White's second year. That article, which discussed a ruling by the U.S. Court of Appeals for the District of Columbia Circuit on comedian George Carlin's "Seven Dirty Words" monologue, was cited by the U.S. Supreme Court in a related ruling. At Columbia, White was a Harlan Fiske Stone scholar and the recipient of the Archie O. Dawson Advocacy Award, which provided clerkships for the study of advocacy at the three levels of the federal judiciary, including a period in the chambers of U.S. Supreme Court Justice Thurgood Marshall.

White served as law clerk to U.S. District Court judge Thomas A. Flannery, and then joined Hogan & Hartson, where he spent roughly three years. Upon leaving Hogan & Hartson, he spent four years promoting his first book, commencing his career as a public speaker and corporate entertainer, and attempting to become a screenwriter. For several years White practiced law sporadically with the firm of Ross, Dixon & Masback. Thereafter, for just over a year, White worked as a legal business consultant for the accounting and consulting firm Arthur Andersen. There he consulted primarily for corporate law departments, where he performed such tasks as a substantive and stylistic overhaul of Exxon's "Guidelines for Use of Outside Counsel".

== Career ==
=== Writing ===
Daniel White's first book, The Official Lawyer's Handbook, ranked #1 on The Washington Post bestseller list and #5 on the Publishers Weekly national list. On the basis of this book The Washington Post called White "the legal profession's court jester" and credited him with having "helped launch the current wave of legal humor." The American Lawyer magazine named White "The Official Lawyer's Comedian". The book was re-published in updated form as Still the Official Lawyer's Handbook, and then released in revised form in Britain, with Philip R. Jenks as co-author.

White's subsequently published White's Law Dictionary, a parody of the classic legal lexicon, Black's Law Dictionary; Trials and Tribulations – An Anthology of Appealing Legal Humor; and What Lawyers Do – And How To Make Them Work for You, a light-in-tone but essentially substantive book that enjoyed the distinction of becoming a Book-of-the-Month Club selection. White has also written a number of relatively minor volumes, a nonexhaustive list of which includes The Classic Cocktails Book, The Martini, Really Redneck, The Birthday Book, and Horrorscopes. Moreover, White wrote a tribute poem to legal practitioners, An Ode to Litigation, which was met with general acclaim when it appeared in the National Law Journal, and one of its 32 stanzas is quoted in Jennifer L. Pierce's treatise, Gender Bender Trials: Emotional Lives in Contemporary Law Firms:

=== Journalism ===
Less known as a journalist, White has contributed to such publications as American Bar Association Journal, Cosmopolitan. Of Counsel, Barrister, Medical Meetings, the Atlanta Journal-Constitution, Atlanta, The Washington Weekly, Minnesota Law & Politics, Docket (ACCA), Employment Law Strategist, Marketing for Lawyers, and Law Firm Partnership & Benefits Report.

At the New York Law Publishing Company, where he worked from 1994 to 1996, White served as editor-in-chief and primary writer for Law Firm Partnership & Benefits Report, a national newsletter for law firm partners and managers. He served as managing editor of two other national newsletters for lawyers, Employment Law Strategist and Marketing for Lawyers, and edited articles for the National Law Journal.

Although his roots lie in legal comedy, White has demonstrated a broader range beginning in 1992–1993, when he served as editor-in-chief of, and primary writer for, Current Comedy, a twice-monthly "Humor Service for Public Speakers & Business Executives" founded by former television gag writer and presidential speechwriter Robert Orben. White has written jokes for Jay Leno. His parody of Ernest Hemingway's writing style appeared in The Best of Bad Hemingway, an anthology. Contrasting himself with lawyers who ridicule the legal profession with "lawyer jokes" and engage in "lawyer bashing", White has said his jabs are soft-gloved and affectionate, because he is "a member of that union", being a lawyer himself and coming from a family of lawyers.

=== Other activities ===
He has addressed bar associations, medical conventions, law firms, and other gatherings across the United States and abroad.
