= The Big Egg Hunt =

2012 Fundraising event

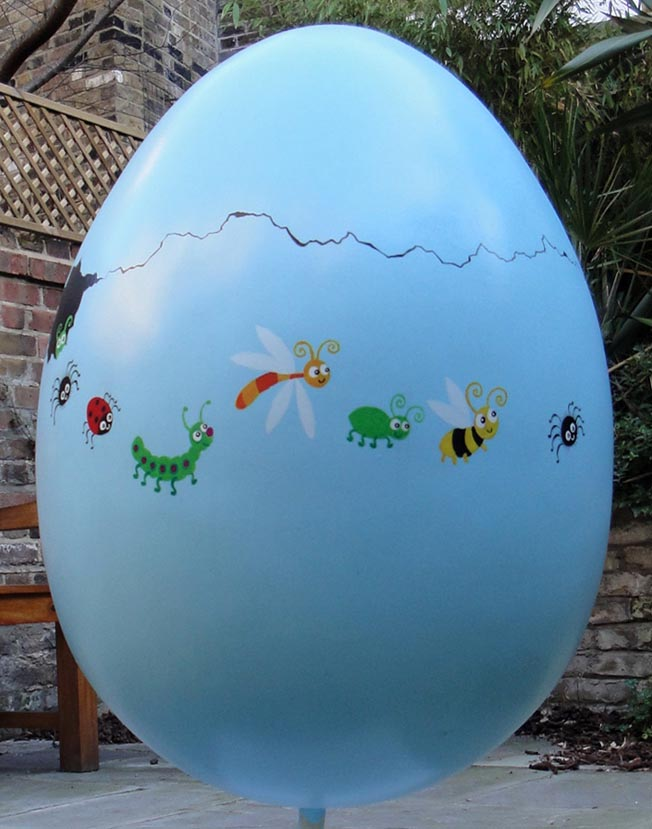
The Great Eggscape by Alexander Williams.

The Big Egg Hunt, also known as the Faberge Big Egg Hunt, was a 2012 charity fundraising campaign in aid of Action for Children and Elephant Family and sponsored by the jeweller Faberge. The two charities backed the largest-ever Easter egg hunt, known as The Big Egg Hunt, in London in the spring of 2012. Around 200 artists, celebrities and designers created and painted metre-high fibreglass eggs which were then placed in selected locations in London. Londoners had forty days from 21 February 2012 to locate the various giant eggs around the capital.

== Background ==
The event followed the Elephant Parade of 2010, organized by Mark Shand and Ruth Powys of Elephant Family, which saw 260 decorated fibreglass elephants installed throughout London. Elephant Parade raised around £4m for elephant-related charities through sponsorship and by selling the individual works of art at auction. The top price paid for a decorated elephant was £155,000 for Jack Vettriano's The Singing Butler Rides Again. Elephant Parade was itself inspired by CowParade, which had its beginnings in Switzerland in 1998 but has since spread around the world.

== Launch ==
The Big Egg Hunt was first launched in November 2011 by food writer Tom Parker Bowles, who created a special "Eggs Faberge" breakfast for the celebrities in attendance. The metre-high eggs were then distributed to various artists and designers. Among the artists contributing designs were Sir Peter Blake, Polly Morgan, the Chapman Brothers, Vivienne Westwood, Giles Deacon, Zandra Rhodes, Diane von Fürstenberg, Sophie Dahl, Martin Aveling, cartoonist Alex Williams, artist and banker Shivani Mathur and film director Sir Ridley Scott.

On 21 February 2012, the Big Egg hunt went "live," with over 200 eggs distributed throughout London in what was billed as the world's largest-ever Easter egg hunt. Each egg displayed a unique code which allowed participants in the egg hunt the opportunity to win a so-called Diamond Jubilee egg, crafted by Faberge and worth over £100,000.

== Missing and Rejected eggs ==
On 25 February, it was reported that two of the eggs had gone missing, presumed to have been stolen. The event organisers appealed for their safe return. The two missing eggs were the "Egg Letter Box" created by Benjamin Shine, located on Carnaby Street, and "Hatch" created by artist Natasha Law. Law's egg was recovered by police a few hours later, but had been damaged and needed repairs. Following the theft, Elephant Family founder Mark Shand was reported as saying that the other eggs had been secured and were now "unstealable." On 28 February, it was reported in the Evening Standard that the "Egg Letter Box" had also been recovered by police.

One egg, the "sub-terra" egg designed by theme park Alton Towers to promote its "Nemesis" ride, was rejected by a number of locations for being too scary.

== Charity auction ==
Around 30 of the eggs were auctioned on 20 March in front of a celebrity audience at the Royal Courts of Justice, where a total of £667,000 was raised for the two charities. Marc Quinn’s egg sold for £40,000 and that of architect Zaha Hadid raised £45,000. A chocolate egg set a record for the world's most expensive chocolate egg.

The remaining eggs were auctioned online, with bids closing at 5pm on Monday 9 April 2012. From 3 to 9 April, all the eggs were displayed together, in Covent Garden, for the first and last time.

== World record ==
On Easter Sunday, Guinness World Records announced that a new title had been achieved for the most participants in an Easter egg hunt, with more than 12,000 people taking part in the charity fundraiser.

== See also ==
- CowParade
- Elephant Parade
