= Martin Aveling =

English wildlife artist

Martin Aveling 'Mart' (born 1982) is an artivist who uses his work to promote wildlife conservation and generate funds for its support.

== Early life ==
Mart grew up in England, Kenya and the Democratic Republic of Congo with his conservationist parents, Conrad and Rosalind Aveling, who at one time ran the Mountain Gorilla Project in Rwanda. While the family was moving to southern Sudan in 1983, Conrad was kidnapped by Sudanese rebels and held hostage. After a dramatic rescue, plans changed, and they ended up moving to the Democratic Republic of Congo where they helped to establish the International Gorilla Conservation Programme (IGCP) in the Virunga National Park.

== Career ==
Mart's first solo exhibition, Metamorphosis, was held at the Pool Room gallery in Nairobi in 2001. After graduating from the University of Bristol in 2004 with a degree in Geography, he became a regular on the London wildlife art scene, and has exhibited with the Society of Wildlife Artists and at the David Shepherd Wildlife Foundation’s ‘Wildlife Artist of the Year’ event.

Mart coined the phrase ‘wildlife artivism’ after questioning the narrative presented by most wildlife art accusing it of largely ignoring the suffering experienced by animals at the hands of humans, which he has likened to only posting about the good times on social media.

Mart has often used the annual ‘Wildlife Artist of the Year’ competition to promote his artivism. In 2017 he gave his rhino horn drawing, titled ‘KERATIN’, a black market valuation of £48,000 to draw attention to scale of the task conservation organisations are faced with when tackling wildlife crime. In 2020 he protested inaction on the climate crisis by exhibiting a jar of ashes, titled ‘Koala in Patel Pencil’ with a QR code on the jar lid that linked to a video of his original koala drawing being burnt. His work titled ‘Plenty More Fish In The Sea’ was Highly Commended at the 2021 exhibition, and depicts a single mackerel on a largely blank page, highlighting destructive fishing practises across the globe.

His work titled, ’Best Before’ was completed in 2020 to bring attention to the captive lion industry in South Africa. It features a lion cub in a tin can with an expiry date of 2025, referencing the age at which a captive lion could expect to lose its life in a canned hunt. The work featured as part of a campaign by the group, ‘Blood Lions’ in 2020 called ‘800 Voices for 800 Lions’, which aimed to achieve a zero quota of lion skeletons exported from South Africa. In 2021 the South African government announced that they intend to end the industry in captive lion breeding. Mart points to this as an example of wildlife artivism really working.

In 2010 Mart drew the first illustration of the newly discovered Myanmar snub-nosed monkey. He also designed an elephant for the London Elephant Parade in 2010, and an egg for The Big Egg Hunt by Fabergé, which took place in London over Easter, 2012. His elephant, named 'Nanook' sold at auction for £9,500, raising funds for Elephant Family and Fauna and Flora International. His egg, 'Pandora', sold for £4,250, raising funds for Elephant Family and Action for Children.

In 2021 Mart was awarded the inaugural ‘David Shepherd Art of Survival Award’ at the 2021 ‘Wildlife Artist of the Year’ online ceremony.

== Representation and associations ==
Mart is a global ambassador for the Derwent Cumberland Pencil Company and produced the cover art for their pastel pencil range. He is a signature member of Artists for Conservation and a partner artist of the David Shepherd Wildlife Foundation. In 2020 he established the Ingrid Beazley Award - a £5,000 grant designed to help wildlife, promote creativity amongst young people, and support people suffering with eco-anxiety.

Mart's work has been auctioned in Paris, and featured in charity auctions hosted by Christie's and Sotheby's.

He currently resides in Bristol.
