= Bleepsgr =

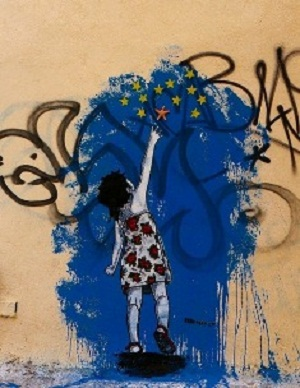
- "The Stars and the Starfish", 2011
- Born: Vlassios M. Kakouris; Athens, Greece
- Known for: Street art, artivism, Social commentary
- Website: www.bleeps.gr

Bleepsgr (or Bleeps) is the pseudonym used by Vlassios (M.) Kakouris, who is a Greek artist. He creates political street art, paintings and installations; he is associated with the artivism movement. Much of his street art is in Athens, but his paintings are also to be found in other parts of Greece, and more widely in Europe.

== History ==
Bleeps was born in Peristeri district, which is located in the West Bank of Athens circa 1980 and he grew up in a low - mid class environment. Vlassios Kakouris, aka Bleepsgr, studied dentistry in the University of Athens, having succeeded in the entry exams in 1996.

Bleeps started creating street art while he was in Bristol, UK, between 2003 and 2005, where he studied painting in City of Bristol College, simultaneously becoming familiar with the local underground scene.

== Style and themes ==
Most of Bleeps' street art projects derive elements from conceptual art, folk art and various past art movements, while the protagonists depicted are associated with Bleeps' interpretation of social life.

His stated goal is to examine systemic figures such as religion, politics, monetary system and consumerism.

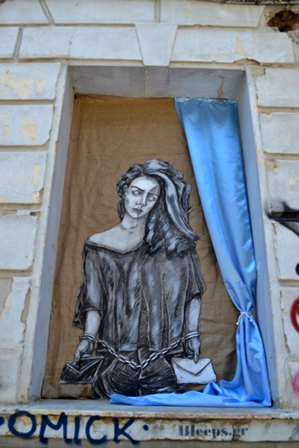
Bleeps' work: part of the windows series 2015

== Financial crisis ==
Since the beginning of the Greek financial crisis in 2008, Bleeps has been creating a series of works related to the crisis' impact on ordinary people and the lower middle class, globally and in his country, in the form of critical discourse.

== Bibliography ==
- Tsilimpounidi Myrto, Walsh Aylwyn (27 June 2014). Remapping 'Crisis': A Guide to Athens. Zero Books. Archived from the original on 4 March 2016.
- Vodeb Oliver, Janovic Nikola (5 February 2014). InDEBTed to INTERVENE. Octivium Press, Queensland College of Art, Griffith University & Memefest. Archived from the original on 4 March 2016.
- Yvan Tessier, Stéphanie Lemoine (15 October 2015). Les Murs Revoltes. Editions Alternatives.
- Ayers David, Hjartarson Benedikt, Huttunen Tomi, Veivo Harri (December 2015). Utopia The Avant-Garde, Modernism and (Im)possible Life. Degruyter.
- Maria Boletsi, Janna Houwen, Liesbeth Minnaard (September 2020). Boletsi, Maria; Houwen, Janna; Minnaard, Liesbeth (eds.). Languages of Resistance, Transformation, and Futurity in Mediterranean Crisis-Scapes. SpringerLink. doi:10.1007/978-3-030-36415-1. ISBN 978-3-030-36414-4. S2CID 240756700.
- Stampoulidis, Georgios (22 May 2021). Street Artivism on Athenian Walls. Lund University Sweden. ISBN 978-91-89213-49-4.
- Tsangaris, Michael (8 November 2021). Radical Communications: Rebellious Expressions on Urban Walls. Lexington Books. pp. 60–62. ISBN 9781793608567.
- Di Siena, Antonio (12 December 2025). Turisti a casa nostra. Tra le macerie invisibili del neoliberismo urbano. ladedizioni. pp. 81–100. ISBN 979-1281995079.

== Selected media publications ==
- International Herald Tribune, (The Global Edition of the New York Times), p. 1 (Cover Photo), p. 3 (Interview), 15–16 October 2011.
- Financial Times DEUTSCHLAND, p. 28, 22 November 2011.
