= Weapons of Mass Creation =

Hip hop band from Anaheim, California

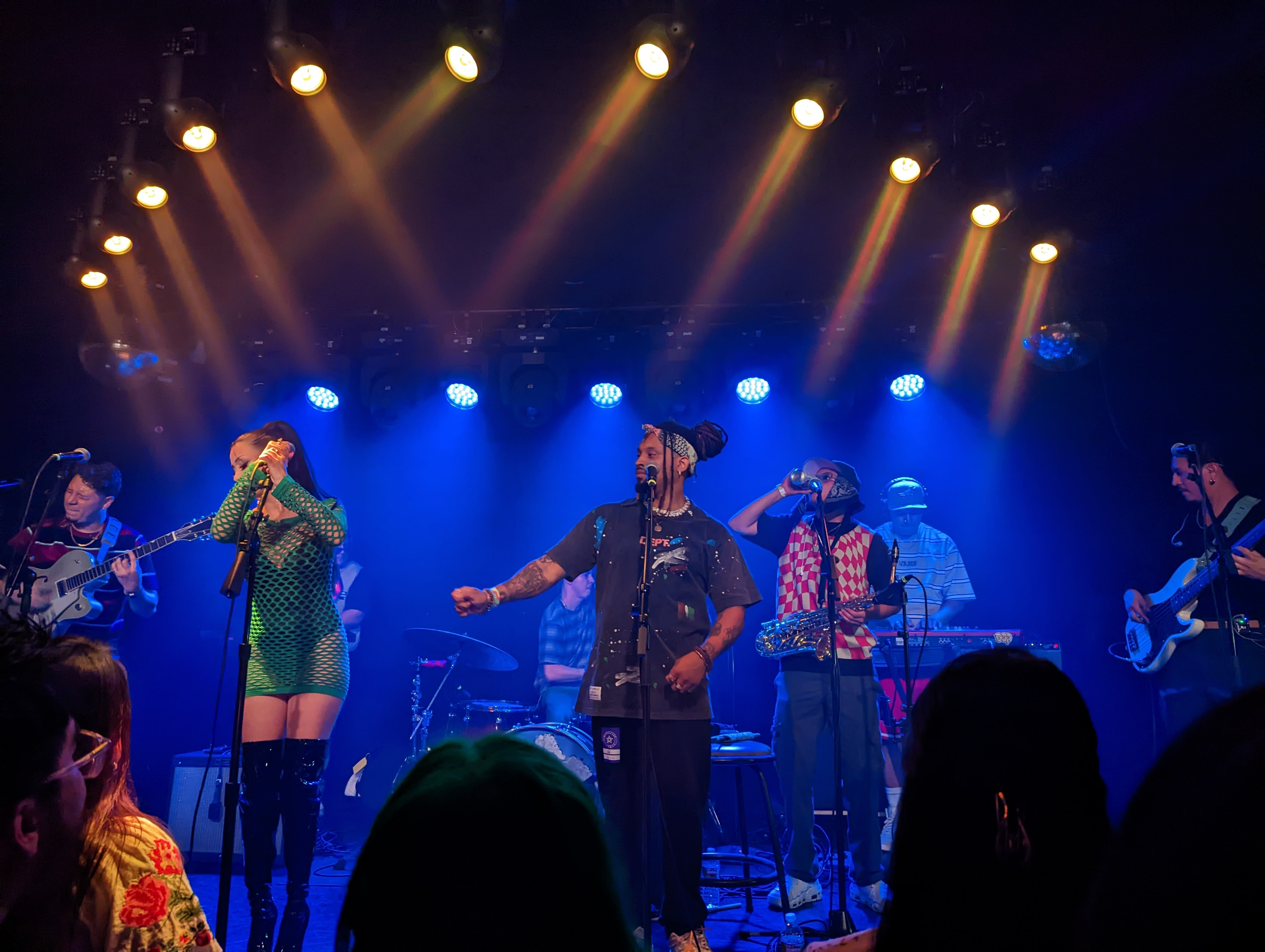

Background information
- Also known as: WOMC
- Origin: Anaheim, California, United States
- Genres: Hip Hop; soul; cumbia
- Years active: 2014–present
- Members: Joules; Jacob; Crudo; Luis; Moe Budda; Solitude; Silas; EQ; HiiKu
- Website: womc714.com

Weapons of Mass Creation also known as WOMC is a hip hop band based in Anaheim, California that plays a blend of hip hop, soul, funk and cumbia among other styles. The band views music as a form of activism and has explored themes of generational trauma, police brutality and misogyny through their music.

== Career ==
Before 2014 WOMC performed under the band name Franco Funktion, composed solely of the Franco siblings Julia, Jacob, Joseph, Luis, and Moses. The musical project was put on hold after the siblings went off to pursue higher education at different institutions in the UC system: UCLA, UCSC and UCSD. In 2014, Josh Quiñonez, family friend and former rapper with group Analytiks, was invited to join the Francos to form Weapons of Mass Creation. Their debut EP titled Five out of Five was released in March 2016 and covered themes of immigration, police brutality, sexism and capitalism. Also in 2016, they released "Rest in Paint" a track dedicated to Gustavo Najera, an old friend who was murdered by Anaheim police.

WOMC released their 2nd EP, Labor of Love on September 28, 2019, at the Long Beach Museum of Art. That same year, they added band member and younger Franco sibling Silas to the group. WOMC received recognition from the OC Weekly as the BEST HIP HOP Act of 2019. The band began performing Labor of Love throughout Orange County and Los Angeles, until the COVID-19 pandemic forced their performances to a standstill. The band used this as an opportunity to focus on their individual artistry and reinvent their collective sound. In June 2021, they released their single, "All I Do" which strayed from their usual sound to a more bouncy, upbeat love song. In February 2023, WOMC released a single titled "Suave".

== Members ==
The members of the band include:

- Julia Franco (Joules): Vocals, songwriting
- Jacob Franco: Bass, vocals, songwriting
- Joseph Franco (Crudo): Keys, composer/producer
- Luis Franco: Guitar, vocals, songwriting
- Moses Franco (Moe Budda): Drums, emcee, composer/producer
- Josh Quiñonez (Solitude): Vocals, songwriting
- Silas Franco: Saxophone, vocals
- Enrique Quiñonez (EQ): Vocals, songwriting
- HiiKu (JEFFPESOS): Keys, composer/producer

== Discography ==
=== Extended plays ===
Title	Details
Five out of Five	Released: April 1, 2016; Format: Digital download
WOMC Mixtape	Released: August 31, 2016; Format: Digital download
Live at Sanctuary Sound	Released: November 6, 2017; Format: Digital download
Labor of Love	Released: October 1, 2019; Format: Digital download
Family Business	Released: August 4, 2023; Format: Digital download

Source: Bandcamp
