= JoFF Rae =

New Zealand artist (born 1966)

- Born: Joffre Ray Kopu; 14 October 1966; Hamilton, New Zealand
- Known for: Production visuals New Media; Music; Graffiti; Urban art Sculpture
- Movement: Artivist; Culture jamming
- Patrons: Steve 'Foot' Kanuta, Graeme Nesbitt
- Website: http://www.artivist.co.nz

JoFF Rae is the pseudonym of New Zealand artist, producer and creative director known for his work in event production, immersive media and visual arts (born Joffre Ray Kopu; 14 October 1966). He has worked on a variety of projects spanning live events, digital media, immersive technologies and collaborative arts initiatives.

== Career ==
Concept design & event management; Creative Director & Technical Director with Urban Arts entity ARTIVIST : creative by any means necessary!; produced various projects in New Zealand & Internationally.

Present roles in production & contracting; & contract Creative Director, Impresario & Producer.

In a Producer role for immersive media company iSPARX.group limited developing immersive media, XR, AR, Ai, spatial media, 360° & VR content & the iSPARX platform for CPS, Edge & 6G technologies; developing art & programs with fine artists & design of event & media concepts for private, NGO & government clients; & developing a commercial boutique template mobile App concepts.

Recent work has involved:

· development of performance contract models based on the Nash Equilibrium and concept production values using 'Propaganda of the deed' ideology;

· production and contracting for Salmonella Dub, a popular New Zealand band;

· developing practical production models based on a venue the James Cabaret and NJL Productions;

· Creative and Producer role with arts initiative th'ink+ & ARTIVIST : creative working projects and management for the entity;

· Producer & Director for hybrid art+media studio and digital commissioning service Guerrilla Media Agency (GMA) - by TOI AGENCY Limited in media development and education in the production and event industry including live streaming and broadcast hybrid concepts;

· facilitating an arts studio with Artists in Residence including Kereama Taepa, Sheyne Tuffery, HAHA (Regan Tamanui, Melbourne) and Nelio (FR); and works with Artist and Activist Tame Iti (NZ); and renown Curator and Artist Reuben Friend (Pataka Gallery, NZ).

== Background ==
With a background in the 1980s and 1990s as a stagehand and sound engineer touring with bands in New Zealand, Australia and Europe, JoFF Rae worked with several artists and promoters on large scale productions while developing an interest and skill in New Media and design. During the 1990s his role was redefined to Production Manager and Line Producer; later still to Event Director and New Media developer; he commuted from Wellington, New Zealand to Melbourne and Sydney for various works in UK, Europe, US and Australia.

In 2001, JoFF Rae (under the nickname RuBbErDuCk), worked with teenage hackers from Australia and Canada on IRC network AustNet to demonstrate media streaming and broadband. They presented for Southern Cross Cable with an installation SXPress Cafe, at Internet World, NOW2001, and CeBIT as 2Xstreams PTY contracted to Jack Morton Worldwide. An award-winning project, the exhibition was a unique demonstration of streaming media on demand (several years prior to YouTube and Vimeo).

Later, in 2004 he established AgentC Guerrilla Media as an urban arts collective to develop artistic productions and urban arts projects; the entity was responsible for recordings with Emma Paki; youth and community event concepts; the formation of !@M3 Sk8 (Lame Skate & BMX Jam incorporated); and funded and produced nationwide tours by New Zealand band Rhombus in 2008 and Salmonella Dub in 2009.

Moving back to Wellington in 2013 he reopened the venue The James Cabaret with a friend Jon 'Jammo' Jameson hosting several domestic and international bands and shows. The venue was the "home of music" for the New Zealand International Arts Festival.

== Art, production and concept development ==
JoFF Rae has developed templates and concept models for IP management, contracting and producing events. His work with shared profit and the Nash Equilibrium in contracting production and performance has been utilised in several successful event contracts.

He has produced idiosyncratic staging and visual production and content systems for works with the contemporary bands Salmonella Dub, Rhombus and fine artist Michel Tuffery MNZM, Mau Arts Forum, AWME (Australasian World Music Expo) & various commercial and private installations. Commercial broadcast concepts included design and management of TV3 celebrity boxing live broadcast 'Fight For Life' in 2001 – breaking records for live broadcast viewers in New Zealand.

== Art and demonstration ==
As a youth JoFF Rae was involved in direct action motivated by artistic causes and social politics; he was employed in the late 1980s in the UK by OXFAM & by Greenpeace in New Zealand in the early 1990s. He has had direct involvement in high-profile clandestine actions involving cultural, environmental and social issues. High-profile actions against French Nuclear Testing at Moruroa involved an active direct role in Bastille Day demonstrations and clandestine direct actions against the French Embassy in Wellington when a test was conducted.

In December 1990 JoFF Rae organised & participated in a "dramatic" action by disturbing the New Zealand Parliament for over 20 minutes & eventually dropping to the floor of the debating chamber from the gallery covered in horse blood demonstrating against sending troops to the Persian Gulf. JoFF Rae instigated several other peaceful protest actions with large scale demonstration marches in Wellington against the Gulf War with up to 10,000 marchers. Other actions involved graffiti in prominent places throughout New Zealand using the slogan "No Blood For Oil" in red & black.

In 2005 JoFF Rae was committed to a maximum security mental institution, a ward of the Henry Rongomau Bennett Centre, for 2 weeks over Christmas following a 6 am raid and arrest by the Armed Offenders Squad after repeatedly challenging Police actions involving allegations of assault & misconduct. He faced several charges in the dispute which were eventually dropped. A diagnosis from the hospital stated "his delusions of grandeur have substance".

After the 2007 New Zealand anti-terror raids JoFF Rae provided resources for protests at the Rotorua Court House for initial charges against Tame Iti & other accused including video equipment to document the proceedings & actions. He edited video as a presentation for peoples in the Urewera mountain range near the town of Ruatoki where the raids occurred. JoFF Rae continued to provide practical support including production for events in the Tuhoe nation with artistic performances by Mau Dance Company and other arts projects.

Mayday Demonstrations, 1 May 2011, JoFF Rae was involved in coordinating and disseminating information and media including a video message from the internet activist group Anonymous to the New Zealand Parliament. The message was taken seriously & gained nationwide press. Several reports claimed the Government website had suffered intermittent failure.

The months leading up to March 2012 with the trials of Tame Iti and the Urewera 4 inspired a series of projects with Ha-Ha the prominent Melbourne based stencil artist and a campaign of "watch this space – Guilty of ART!//" statements in street art, graffiti and installations.

== Personal ==
Born Joffre Ray Kopu on 14 October 1966 at Hamilton, New Zealand.

His partner since 1992 Audrey Holyoake is a collaborator as a producer & graphic artist in their artistic & commercial ventures. The couple have 3 children – Cole (Jan '94), Oscar (Dec'94) & Bram (July 2000) & with 3 cats they reside in Wellington, New Zealand.
