= The Official Lawyer's Handbook =

1983 book by Daniel R. White

- Author: Daniel R. White
- Publisher: Simon & Schuster
- ISBN: 978-0452266940

The Official Lawyer's Handbook is a best-selling satire on law and lawyers written by the lawyer Daniel R. White, and originally published in the United States by Simon & Schuster in 1983. The Handbook was adapted and republished in Britain under the name The Queens Counsel Official Lawyers' Handbook, published by the Robson Press, an imprint of Biteback Publishing.

== Background ==
Public distrust of lawyers reached record heights in the United States after the Watergate scandal. In the aftermath of Watergate, legal self-help books became popular among those who wished to solve their legal problems without having to deal with lawyers. Lawyer jokes (already a perennial favorite) also soared in popularity in English-speaking North America as a result of Watergate. In 1989, American legal self-help publisher Nolo Press published a 171-page compilation of negative anecdotes about lawyers from throughout human history.

== Content ==
The Official Lawyer's Handbook described itself as "the ultimate guide to surviving a legal career". Tips included: "The Bar Exam – Thousands of morons have passed – so can you", "Partnership: you can make it, if you know what to kiss, and whose", and "Understanding what lawyers do – and how to stop them doing it to you".

== Response ==
The Official Lawyer's Handbook was a best-seller, ranking #1 on The Washington Post best seller list and #5 on the Publishers Weekly national list. Critical reviews were generally supportive. The Washington Post declared White "the legal profession's court jester" and credited him with having "helped launch the current wave of legal humor." It was described by Time magazine as a book which would "not win an award from the American Bar Association".

== Other editions ==
The Handbook was updated and re-printed in 1991 as Still the Official Lawyer's Handbook, It was also published in revised form in Britain in 1991, by Harriman House publishing, with Philip R. Jenks as co-author. The UK edition was described by The Times as "one of the most irreverent, funny and perceptive books about the legal profession ever published". In 2011, the Handbook was again adapted and republished in Britain under the name The Queens Counsel Official Lawyers' Handbook, by the Robson Press, with Alex Williams as artist and co-author.
