= Pearson College London =

British higher education institution

Coordinates: 51.5167°N 0.1233°W

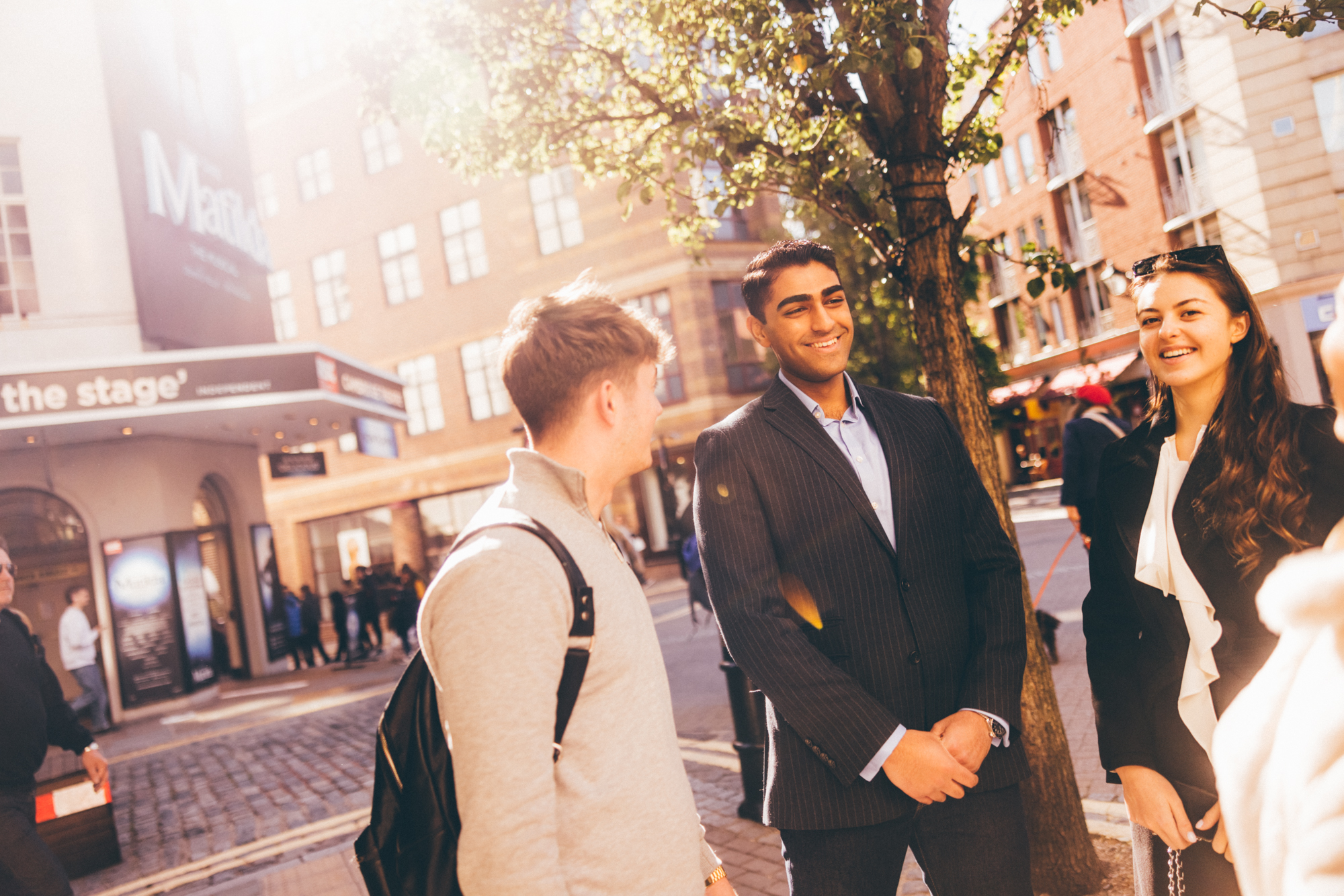
- Type: Private
- Established: 2012
- Location: London, United Kingdom

Pearson College London was a British higher education institution, founded in 2012; it was based in London and was previously owned by Pearson plc. The institution was officially separated into two subdivisions - Pearson Business School, which offered business-related degrees and short courses, and Escape Studios, a visual effects academy Pearson plc acquired in 2013 which offers degrees and short courses in the creative arts ranging from VFX to Game Art and Animation.

== History ==
The creation of Pearson College London was announced in July 2011.

Pearson College London launched its first degree programme in September 2012.

In August 2013, it was announced that Pearson College London would begin offering business degrees validated by Ashridge Business School, whilst continuing with its partnership with Royal Holloway.

In October 2013, Pearson College London acquired Escape Studios, Europe's leading VFX academy. Escape Studios now also offers courses in VFX, Games and Animation at undergraduate, postgraduate and short course levels.

All degrees are currently awarded by a third party institute, most notably Business degrees are awarded by the University of Kent, but the college is in the process of getting their own degree awarding power from the relevant Government body.

In the past couple of years the size of the college has rapidly increased and currently it has approximately 1300 student (2019).

The college directly employs a minor amount of academic staff. Most lecturers are on a short-term contract working a couple of days a week. In the rest of their time, they usually work in the field of their expertise. This allows them to bring their experiences into the classrooms and work on real-life case studies. Due to the lack of full time academics, the college very rarely publishes academic papers.

In June 2023 Pearson College London was acquired by AAP Education Limited, no longer recruiting for Pearson Business School the company is now trading as Escape Studios and offering the programmes in Animation, Games and VFX only.

== Location ==
Students of Pearson College London primarily studied at Pearson's offices in London at 190 High Holborn.

== Courses ==
Pearson College London offered undergraduate and postgraduate degrees and a range of short courses. The courses covered Business, Enterprise, Computer Animation, Video Games and Visual Effects. Courses could be studied full-time or part-time, depending on which course was chosen.

The degree programmes were awarded by the University of Kent. All of the degrees were designed, developed and delivered with industry partners including IBM, Sony Pictures Entertainment, WPP plc, Unilever, BT Group, Lloyd's of London, Savills and L'Oreal. Industry partners within VFX, Games and Animation include Framestore, The Mill, Moving Picture Company (MPC), BlueBolt, Electric Theatre, Milk and Jellyfish Pictures.

Pearson College previously offered a wide variety of degree apprenticeships, where students worked four days a week at one of the industry partners, then attended university one day a week. The schemes were usually free, and students got a wage from the company for whom they worked.
