= Jasiri X =

American rapper and activist

- Born: Jasiri Oronde Smith; Chicago, Illinois, U.S.
- Occupations: Rapper, activist
- Organization(s): 1Hood, 1Hood Media
- Notable work: "Free the Jena 6"; "What if the Tea Party was Black?"
- Spouse: Celeste C. Smith
- Awards: Honorary doctorate, Chicago Theological Seminary (2016), Robert Rauschenberg Foundation Artist as Activist Award (2015), USA Fellow (2015)
- Website: www.jasirix.com

Jasiri X (born Jasiri Oronde Smith) is an American rapper and activist who gained attention for his 2007 song "Free the Jena 6". He is a recipient of the Rauschenberg Artist as Activist award and co-founder of anti-violence group 1Hood. In 2016, he was awarded an honorary doctorate from the Chicago Theological Seminary.

== Early life ==
Jasiri X was born Jasiri Oronde Smith in Chicago, Illinois. In the 1980s he moved with his mother to Monroeville, Pennsylvania and attended Gateway High School, graduating at age 16. Intending to become a lawyer, he began college at the University of Maryland, then attended the University of Pittsburgh but did not finish college.

== Career ==
After leaving school, Jasiri began performing spoken word, initially under the name Jo Smith. He also became an activist and was introduced to the Nation of Islam, taken by an acquaintance to a mosque in 1997. Jasiri met Louis Farrakhan a year later when Farrakhan was in Pittsburgh to support a boycott, and Jasiri subsequently registered as a member the Nation of Islam. In 2005, he became the minister of Muhammad Mosque No. 22 in Wilkinsburg.

Jasiri X has created music addressing social and political issues, including his 2007 song "Free the Jena 6", "Trayvon" following George Zimmerman's killing of Trayvon Martin in February 2012, "Do We Need to Start a Riot?" and "What if the Tea Party was Black?" He encouraged other hip-hop artists to engage these concerns as well.

In 2010 he released his first album, American History X. In 2013, he released a second album, called Ascension, with Vancouver label Wandering Worx. In 2013, Jasiri X was part of a delegation of artists and activists, including labor leader Bill Fletcher and writer Dream Hampton, who visited the State of Palestine and Israel. The Carter Center funded the trip. Jasiri produced a music video for his rap song "Checkpoint", which is based on the occupation, oppression, colonialism, and discrimination he witnessed firsthand during his trip to Palestine and Israel. The video features footage Jasiri himself captured of Israeli soldiers and newsreel clips of Israel Defense Forces brutality against Palestinians.

In 2015, he released Black Liberation Theology, with features from David Banner and Tef Poe among others. He has mentioned Nas, Wu-Tang Clan, Mobb Deep, Lauryn Hill, Tupac, the Notorious B.I.G., Public Enemy, and KRS-One as among his musical influences.

Jasiri X also has a YouTube-based show "This Week with Jasiri X" and has been an advocate for net neutrality particularly as it relates to protecting access for low-income people of color.

In 2006, he cofounded the anti-violence group 1Hood, which includes a media academy teaching young black boys to analyze media as well as create their own.

=== Awards and grants ===
- 2015 "Artist as Activist" fellowship at the Robert Rauschenberg Foundation
- 2015 USA Fellow, a $50,000 award from United States Artists for "innovative, accomplished artists...for their fresh perspectives, unique artistic vision, and impact on their field"
- 2015 commission from the Open Society Foundation to create a film on the effects of the drug war on South America
- 2016 honorary doctorate from the Chicago Theological Seminary

== See also ==
- Conscious hip-hop
- Black Lives Matter
