= King's Counsel (comic strip) =

British comic by Alexander Williams and Graham Francis Defries

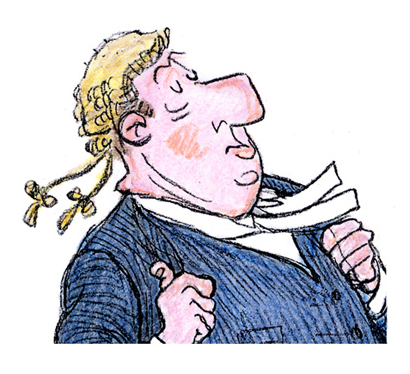
- Sir Geoffrey Bentwood KC
- Author(s): Alex Steuart Williams; Graham Francis Defries
- Website: www.kccartoon.com
- Current status/schedule: weekly in The Times
- Launch date: 3 October 1993
- Alternate name: Queen's Counsel
- Genre(s): Law humour, satire

King's Counsel (formerly Queen's Counsel until September 2022) is a British cartoon strip created by Alexander Williams and Graham Francis Defries, which has been published in the law pages of The Times since 1993. It is a satire on law and lawyers. The strip is published under the pseudonym "Steuart and Francis", these being the middle names of the two authors.

== Humour ==
The cartoons, described as "the scourge, or possibly succour, of lawyers everywhere", make fun of law and lawyers, with a particular focus on legal pomposity and over-billing. The characters are mostly legal archetypes, the barristers inhabiting the mythical Chambers of 4 Lawn Buildings, while the solicitors ply their trade at the firm of Fillibuster and Loophole. The authors of the strip are both lawyers themselves, though Williams left the Bar to pursue a career in film animation.

== Origins ==
According to Williams, Queen's Counsel "began life in the early 1990s as a satire on politicians, and was rejected by Private Eye...for being too much like Alan B'Stard". Later, Williams discovered he could "take the same characters, stick wigs on them and turn them into barristers".

== Characters ==
Sir Geoffrey Bentwood KC is the main protagonist of the comic strip. He is a leading silk, Head of Chambers, part-time recorder and all-around master of the legal universe. Extremely pompous, Sir Geoffrey is obsessed with law in general, and with being elevated to the High Court in particular. Even his family call him "Your Honour".

Edward Longwind is a barrister and junior tenant at 4 Lawn Buildings. He aspires one day to be as pompous as Sir Geoffrey.

Helena is a junior tenant. She was the first female pupil in Chambers and has been trying to open up the stuffy windows of 4 Lawn Buildings ever since.

Richard Loophole is a solicitor-advocate and senior partner in the firm of Fillibuster and Loophole. He is overpaid and—for the most part—underworked, unlike his luckless assistants, who regularly have to work over the weekend as Richard saunters off to play golf with his clients.

Quentin Crawley is a pupil barrister in 4 Lawn Buildings and all-around dogsbody. His grasp of law is slender at best and his appearances in court are inevitably fumbled. He lives in permanent terror of being found out and booted out of Chambers.

Mr Sprocket is a client and endlessly unlucky litigant. He is invariably given terrible (and expensive) advice, usually resulting in a failed case and likely bankruptcy.

Rachel is Richard's assistant solicitor. Like Helena she still retains some idealism and can dimly remember why she went into law in the first place.

== Books ==
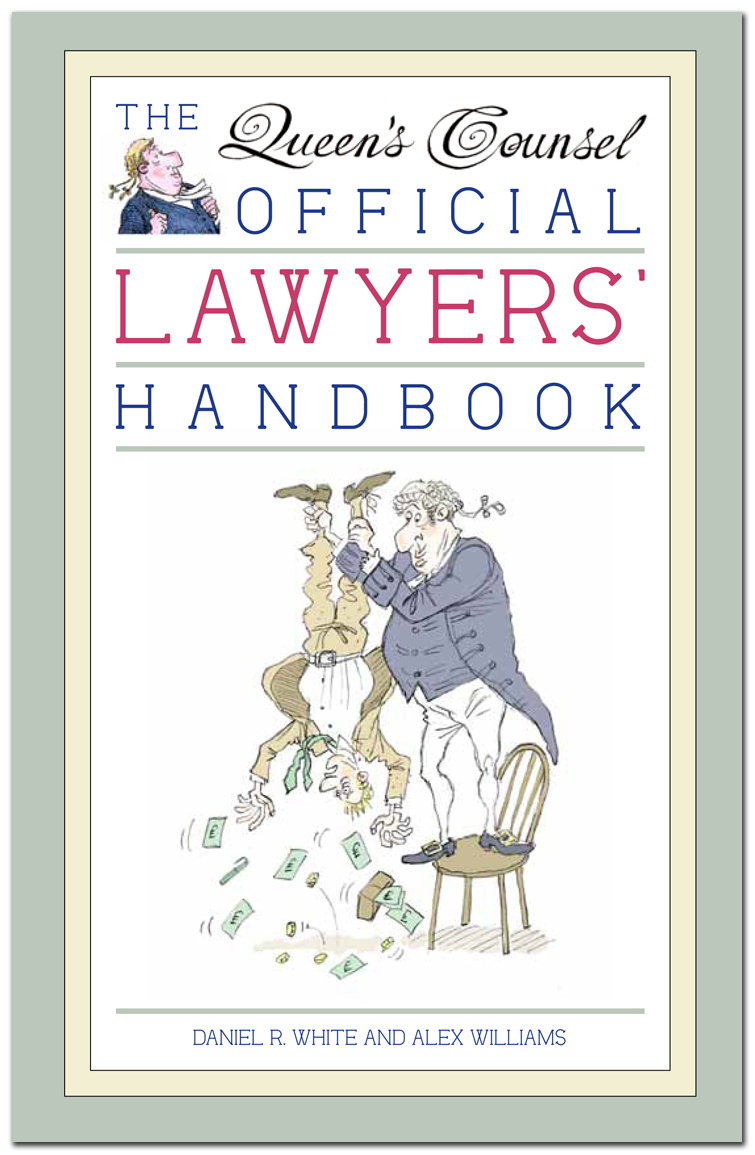
The Queen's Counsel Official Lawyer's Handbook (2011)

King's Counsel cartoons have been collected and published in a number of volumes.

- Queen's Counsel – A Libellous Look at the Law (Robson Books 1995)
- Queen's Counsel – Judgment Day (Robson Books 1996)
- Queen's Counsel – Laying Down the Law (Times Books 1997)
- The Times – Best of Queen's Counsel HarperCollins (1999)
- Lawyers Uncovered – Everything You Always Wanted to Know About Law But Didn't Want to Pay £500 an Hour to Find Out JR Books (1997)
- 101 Ways to Leave the Law JR Books, London (2009)
- The Queen's Counsel Official Lawyer's Handbook The Robson Press, London (2011)
