= The Eyes of Thailand =

- Directed by: Windy Borman
- Written by: Tim O'Brien; Windy Borman
- Produced by: Windy Borman; Tim VandeSteeg
- Narrated by: Ashley Judd
- Edited by: Gary Schillinger
- Music by: Steve Horner
- Release date: April 28, 2012 (Newport Beach Film Festival)
- Country: United States
- Language: English

The Eyes of Thailand is a 2012 documentary film directed and produced by Windy Borman and produced by Tim VandeSteeg. The film chronicles the work of Soraida Salwala, who opened the world's first elephant hospital (Friends of Asian Elephants Hospital) in Lampang, Thailand and together with her team, created the world's first elephant prosthesis.

== Plot ==
The Eyes of Thailand tells the true story of Soraida Salwala's 10-year quest to help two elephant landmine survivors, Motala and Baby Mosha, walk again after losing their legs in landmine accidents. Along with Soraida's efforts to care for the injured elephants and ultimately help them to walk again, the film also highlights the dangers posed by landmines.

== Production ==
Director/Producer Windy Borman started making this film in 2007. The film went through several revisions due to then-ongoing changes in the story of Motala and Mosha. Actress Ashley Judd served as the narrator, saying about the film, "I hope it will raise awareness to protect Asian elephants—and all beings—from the terror of landmines."

=== Accolades ===
Award	Date of ceremony	Category	Recipient(s)	Result
Ace Documentary Grant	December 30, 2011	Documentary		Won
