= Andrea Tessitore =

Italian lawyer and entrepreneur

- Born: May 25, 1973 (age 53); Turin, Italy
- Spouse: Celine Sarda De Castilla

Andrea Tessitore (born May 25, 1973) is an Italian lawyer and entrepreneur, co-founder and chairman of Crea.Re Group, a real estate holding company focused on residential and commercial operations in Milan and Turin area. He co-founded Italia Independent Group with Lapo Elkann and Giovanni Accongiagioco. Since April 2017 he is senior advisor of Elite - Borsa Italiana. He is responsible for the project Elite - Confindustria which aims to accelerate the growth of the Elite international platform. He is Vice-President of Paolo Castelli S.p.A., company leader in the global contracting and in the design sector.

== Personal life ==
Andrea Tessitore was born in Turin on 25 May 1973. Andrea Tessitore pursued his law degree from the University of Turin, Department of Law. In the year 2000 he graduated an LLM from the University of Virginia School of Law. In 2001 he qualified as a lawyer in the state of New York, joining the New York State Bar Association. He is married to Celine Sarda De Castilla with whom he had three children: Achille, Allegra and Olimpia.

== Career ==
Along with Lapo Elkann and Giovanni Accongiagioco, in 2007 he founded Italia Independent, a company specializing in the production and sale of luxury eyewear, accessories, and clothing, characterized by the possibility offered to the buyer to customize the product to be purchased. The first product, presented at Pitti Men in January 2007, was an eyewear model made entirely of carbon fibre. The company then developed a line of clothing, accessories, and with several collaborations in home and automotive decorations. In addition to eyewear, also launched were jewellery, a watch, a bicycle, and skateboard for urban transport. He has been the CEO of the Group until November 2016. As CEO, he led the company to listing on the Milan Stock Exchange, on the AIM segment, on 28 June 2013.

Andrea Tessitore founded the company AT & Partners in 2017, a strategic, financial and business consulting firm. The company cooperates with major private investors and institutional private equity funds including PineBridge Benson Elliot, Zetland Capital Partners and Eurazeo.

Since 2018 Andrea Tessitore is the chairman of the innovative start-up Crea.Re Digital, which operates through www.mutuiqui.it and www.vivoqui.it.

In 2017 he founded, with Simone Pansa, Crea.Re Group, a Real Estate holding company focused on the Milan and Turin area. Crea.Re Group invests with private and institutional partners.

In November 2023 Andrea Tessitore acquired minority shares in Paolo Castelli, company leader in the global contracting and in the design sector.

== Awards and honors ==
Together with the founding partners of Italia Independent Group, he won the 2014 EY Award Entrepreneur of the Year in the “Emerging” category. In March 2016, he was nominated as a member of the Executive Board of the Comitato Leonardo.
