= Julio Salgado =

Mexican artist

Julio Salgado (born September 1, 1983) is a gay Mexican-born artist who grew up in Long Beach, California. Through the use of art, Salgado has become a well-known activist within the DREAM Act movement. Salgado uses his art to empower undocumented and queer people by telling their story and putting a human face to the issue. He has worked on various art projects that address anti-immigrant discourse, the issues of what it means to be undocumented, and what it means to be undocu-queer. One of his more well-known projects is a series of satire images addressing American Apparel’s use of a farm worker in one of their ads in the summer of 2011.

== Early life and education ==
Salgado was born on September 1, 1983, in Ensenada, Mexico. When Salgado’s younger sister was diagnosed with a life-threatening kidney disease in 1995, Salgado and his family emigrated to the United States. After being advised by the doctor that a return to Mexico would result in his sister's death, Salgado’s family decided to remain in the United States. The Salgado family overstayed their visas and Salgado was left to live under an undocumented immigrant status in the United States. Salgado attended David Starr Jordan High School in Long Beach, California and graduated from the class of 2001. Because Salgado was an undocumented student, he did not qualify for federal financial aid. After high school Salgado took on various low-paying jobs in order to pay his way through college. In 2010 he obtained a Bachelor of Arts in Journalism from California State University, Long Beach. He began his artistic career as the editorial cartoonist for the Daily 49er newspaper of CSU, Long Beach.

Salgado faced the challenges of being both undocumented and gay, forcing him to "come out" twice. Growing up in a traditional heterosexual family Salgado found being queer a much more difficult challenge than being undocumented. During his high school and college years, afraid of insults and rejection, he maintained his queer identity hidden and only felt safe revealing his undocumented status since many of those around him faced the same struggle. Salgado’s mother was the first person to know about his queer identity. In the 8th grade, he began documenting intimate sketches and writings in a personal journal, expressing his feelings for other boys. After his mother stumbled upon this journal and read his entries, he had no choice but to confess his queer identity. To Salgado’s surprise, his mother was very understanding and accepted him regardless. Salgado has made his queer identity and undocumented status public by speaking on the need to humanize both issues.

== Career ==
In 2010, a group of undocumented students protested in front of the Hart Senate Building in Washington, D.C., demanding the passage of the Federal DREAM Act. Julio’s activist role emerged after coming across the photograph in the Washington Post of Diana Yael Martinez, an undocumented student who was being arrested after refusing to leave the sit-in at the senate building. His anger with such treatment ignited the illustrations that were later used in the DREAM Act movement. He states, “I channeled all that anger into my sketchpad and I began to draw.”. Although Julio's use of art began as a refuge that saved him from his hardships, DREAM Act activists soon found themselves using them as weapons for rallies and campaigns. Salgado links his undocumented and queer identity in most of his artwork in order to put a face to the issue. Salgado explains, “In the past, one could see articles or interviews with a hidden face or an anonymous name. That would dehumanize the issue and by us coming out and saying we’re undocumented and unafraid, we’re putting a face to it." As a result, he has worked on multiple projects that give young undocumented and undocumented queers a chance to come out of the shadows and share their experiences. Salgado uses his art as a form of activism. He considers himself an "artivist".

== Projects ==
=== I am Undocu-Queer! ===
Salgado began working on the “I am Undocu-Queer!” art project in 2012. With this project Salgado, in conjunction with the Queer Undocumented Immigrant Project (QUIP), “aims to give … undocumented queers more of a presence in the discussion of migrant rights”. The illustrations consist of images of actual young undocumented queer people who have chosen to come out of the shadows to define what it means to be both undocumented and queer.

=== Undocumented Apparel ===
In May 2012 American Apparel faced criticism due to a magazine ad that was published in the Summer of 2011. The ad features a young white female model linking arms with a dark-skinned Latino farm worker. The ad identifies the models as “Robin a USC student, studying Public Relations, with Raul, a California farmer in Denim and Chambray.” In an interview with ColorLines Salgado expressed his reaction: “My first thought was, this is so unrealistic…. what exactly is it that American Apparel is trying to say here? Is it, ‘See? There’s unity? We like you!’ That's not how it happens, and American Apparel has always used people, especially women, as objects. Were they just doing this to get on the undocumented wagon?”

Salgado created the “Undocumented Apparel” series as a reaction to the original ad by drawing real undocumented people that are part of his life. The images of the people are also “accompanied by an acidic quote contrasting their lives to American Apparel’s upwardly mobile clientele.” Like much of Salgado's previous work, the images turned into a form of homage for the people he knows.

=== Dreamers Adrift ===
In 2010 Salgado along with four friends – Jesus Iñiguez, Fernando Romero, and Deisy Hernandez – launched the nationwide media project DREAMers Adrift. The project features a series of videos titled “Undocumented and Awkward” that demonstrate through the use of comedy the predicaments in which numerous of undocumented students find themselves in throughout and after college. Salgado states that many of the situations that are acted out throughout the skits are situations that he has personally found himself in.

=== “For My Dreamers” ===
Salgado dedicates much of his art to the undocumented activists who are in the forefront of the DREAM Act movement. The images include messages in support of the DREAM Act, opposition to anti-immigrant bills, as well as messages of encouragement for undocumented people. Salgado also uses his art in order to raise awareness of deportation cases and the ways that people can take action in order to stop them. Much of his artwork is used in rallies all throughout the United States in support of the DREAM Act.

=== "I Exist" ===
The “I Exist” collection specifically addresses the DREAM Act movement. The images in this collection demand the anti-immigrant discourse in mainstream media to humanize the language and treatment aimed towards undocumented youth. Salgado declares: “The language that anti-immigrant folks have used [aims to]…erase our identities or erase the fact that we exist here. So I wanted with my artwork kind of to say, ‘hey listen, I exist,’ [and] it's almost like a scream."
