= Sol Collective =

Community center and activist group in California, USA

- Formation: 2005; 21 years ago
- Founder: Estella Sanchez
- Type: Organization
- Purpose: Community center
- Headquarters: Sacramento, California
- Website: Official website

Sol Collective is an organization based in Sacramento, California. It is community center that is reportedly dedicated to healthy lifestyles the arts, and culture. It also has a background in activism. It operates in a similar format to the La Peña Cultural Center in Berkeley. It has worked in partnership over the years with organizations such as Verge, the Crocker and the Sacramento History Museum. It serves as a platform for performing and visual arts.

== Overview ==
Sol Collective was founded in 2005 by Estella Sanchez, a daughter of Mexican immigrants. In 2003, while working as a teacher, she founded the group. While taking her lunch break one day, she saw an empty building with a "for rent" sign. At the time she was staying with her father so she had a bit of disposable income. She then rented the building and that was the start of the collective. The organization was first located at Del Paso Boulevard. In 2008 a fire destroyed their premises and around 2009, they ended up on 21st Street. Sanchez is a former adviser at the Sacramento Met School, and drug-prevention counselor.

According to an article in the November 15, 2015 edition of The Sacramento Bee, they were looking for new premises. In October 2016, director Sanchez was attempting to raise $35,000 which was required to complete the $100,000 down payment on the premises of the organization. The landlord was selling and $406,000 was the purchase price. At the time of an article appearing in The Sacramento Bee on October 11, at least $4,156 had been raised by their online crowdsourcing campaign.

== Events ==
Annually the organization hosts the "Honoring Our Past" event in collaboration with the Sacramento History Museum. On the 29th of October they held the “Skulls and Skeletons: Day of the Dead Printmaking Workshop” at the museum.

In 2015, along with other organizations they worked in collaboration with The Ethnic Studies Program and The Center for Families, on the “Semillas y Culturas~Seeds and Cultures” Conference which was held at the Woodland Community College.
