= Callington Road Hospital =

- Avon and Wiltshire Mental Health Partnership NHS Trust

Geography
- Location: Bristol, England
- Coordinates: 51.4315°N 2.5575°W

Organisation
- Care system: NHS
- Type: Specialist
- Affiliated university: The University of the West of England

Services
- Emergency department: No
- Beds: 122
- Speciality: Mental Health

History
- Opened: 2006

Links
- Website: www.awp.nhs.uk

Callington Road Hospital is a psychiatric hospital in Bristol, England. Opened in 2006, it primarily replaced Barrow Hospital, providing psychiatric inpatient and community services for Bristol and the surrounding region. It is run by the Avon and Wiltshire Mental Health Partnership NHS Trust.

== History ==
=== Construction ===
In the early 2000s, a replacement was required for Barrow Hospital, which was built in 1939. By 2002, a site was chosen for the new hospital; surplus council allotments on Callington Road, Brislington; adjacent to the former Brislington Railway Station. Avon and Wiltshire Partnership faced opposition from a local community group who felt the site was too close to a school, and mental health charity MIND who felt the area was too noisy, however in 2003 Bristol City Council sold the former allotments and construction began. Callington Road Hospital was completed and opened in 2006. A condition of planning approval was that funds be provided to develop neighbouring land into a nature reserve, which was opened in 2009.

The grounds were landscaped to include paths, water features and gardens with interpretation boards. The allotments previously on the site supported badgers, slow worms and various birds. Consideration of the ecological aspects of the site was required by Bristol City Council for project approval.

=== Alterations ===
Acer Unit (drug and alcohol rehab) was initially based at Callington Road, but in 2011 swapped buildings with Elizabeth Casson House (female PICU) and is now based at Blackberry Hill Hospital. Callington Road was the location of Bristol's one-bed Place Of Safety until the four-bed Mason Unit was opened at Southmead Hospital in 2014. Both Lime and Silver Birch Acute Wards were originally built with attached High Dependency Units (HDU's); both were decommissioned in line with trust-wide changes.

=== Projects ===
A series of arts projects were run at Callington Road, for adults within the hospital. Led by a poet, a musician and a visual artist, the project culminated in a booklet of poems, a CD and a series of felt collages. The work was jointly funded by the mental health trust and city council.

== Services ==
The hospital provides the following services:

=== Inpatient ===
- Lime Unit and Silver Birch Unit - adult acute wards
- Hazel Unit - psychiatric intensive care unit (male)
- Elizabeth Casson House - psychiatric intensive care unit (female)
- Alder Unit - rehabilitation and reablement
- Aspen Ward - older adults (functional illnesses)
- Laurel Ward - older adults (organic illnesses) - temporarily closed because of unspecified "safety-related concerns"
- Linden Unit - electroconvulsive therapy service
- Larch Step Down - rehabilitation
- Art Psychotherapy, Occupational Therapy, Physiotherapy and Nutrition & Diatetics are available on site.

=== Community ===
- The Crisis Team
- The Complex Interventions Team - specialist older adults community mental health service
- The Bristol Active Life Project
- Dementia Wellbeing Service - a partnership of the Alzheimer's Society and Devon Partnership NHS Trust

=== Service-user and non-NHS led services ===
A self-help group run by Bristol Hearing Voices Network is held at Callington Road. The mental health charity Rethink runs a carers' art group and carers' gardening club on site.

Callington Road Hospital does not provide Secure (forensic) Mental Health Services; which are provided at Blackberry Hill Hospital, or Child and Adolescent Mental Health Services (CAMHS), including Eating Disorders); which are provided at Southmead and the Riverside Unit.

== Performance ==
A Care Quality Commission inspection in 2014 found most standards were met, however standards for record keeping and risk management were not met. This followed police concerns over the number of patients absconding while on leave from the hospital.

== See also ==
- Petherton Resource Centre (south Bristol community services)
- Brookland Hall (central Bristol community services)
- Healthcare in Bristol
