= Glenside Museum =

Hospital museum in Bristol, England

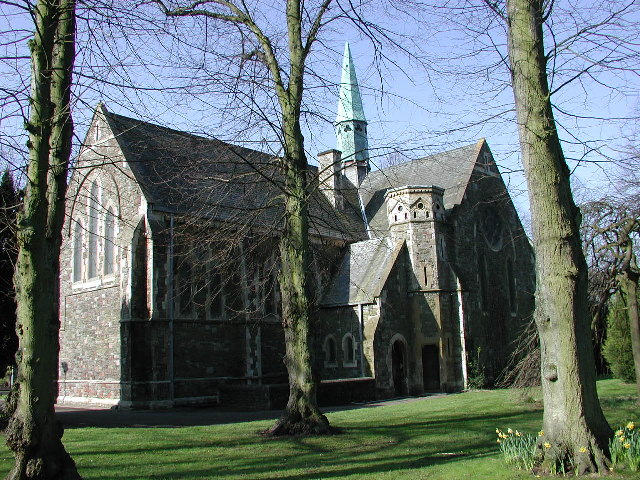

- Location within Bristol
- Location: Glenside Campus, Fishponds, Bristol, England
- Coordinates: 51.4849°N 2.5430°W
- Website: www.glensidemuseum.org.uk

Glenside Museum is situated within the Glenside Campus of the University of the West of England in Fishponds, Bristol, England.

The museum was founded by Dr Donal F. Early; a consultant psychiatrist at Glenside Hospital from the 1950s. He collected items of memorabilia and started a collection on the balcony of the dining hall of Glenside. When the building closed, the collection was re-located to the Glenside Chapel, and the collection slowly was built up to the museum it is today. The chapel was built in 1861 and is a grade II listed building. The museums collection consists of a wide range of paraphernalia and images from the life of Glenside Hospital (previously known as the Bristol Lunatic Asylum, Beaufort War Hospital in World War I, then Bristol Mental Hospital) and of the local Learning disability Hospitals of the Stoke Park Group and the Burden Neurological Institution. The museum has drawings and paintings by the accomplished artist Dennis Reed who painted images of life at Glenside during the 1950s. These painting are located in the chancel. The museum depends on donations from the public, and there is a booking fee for events and exhibits at the museum.

Exhibits include several early Electroconvulsive therapy (ECT) machines. Photographs taken of patients from the 1890s are on display at the museum, accompanied by information into their lives and care, researched by retired mental health nurse Paul Tobia.

One of the most celebrated workers at the former Bristol Lunatic Asylum was the painter Stanley Spencer (later Sir Stanley Spencer RA CBE) who worked there in 1915–1916 as medical orderly in the Royal Army Medical Corps. During World War I the asylum was turned over to military use and renamed the Beaufort War Hospital. It had to accommodate some 1,460 wounded soldiers at any one time, usually more. A number of the patients were retained to perform menial duties. As is recounted in Paul Gough's book, Stanley Spencer: Journey to Burghclere Spencer had a difficult time in the hospital, leavened by moments of quiet reverie, as the painter wrote of his second day "I had to scrub out the Asylum Church. It was a splendid test of my feelings about this war. And I still feel the necessity of the war, & I have seen some sights, but not what one might expect. The lunatics are good workers & one persists in saluting us & always with the wrong hand. Another one thinks he is an electric battery... "

On 14 December 2009, on the 50th anniversary of Spencer's death the University of the West of England – who now own the hospital building – held a celebratory event to unveil a series of artwork and a blue plaque remembering the painter's time in the vast teeming metropolis of the Beaufort.

== See also ==
- Healthcare in Bristol
- Blackberry Hill Hospital
- Churches in Bristol
