= Glenside =

Glenside may refer to:

== Places ==
=== Australia ===
- Glenside, South Australia, a suburb of Adelaide
  - Glenside Hospital (Adelaide)

=== Canada ===
- Glenside, Saskatchewan, Canada, a village
- Rural Municipality of Glenside No. 377, Saskatchewan

=== New Zealand ===
- Glenside, New Zealand, a suburb of Wellington

=== United Kingdom ===
- Glenside, Bristol, a campus of the University of the West of England
  - Glenside Museum
  - Glenside Hospital, formerly Beaufort War Hospital, Bristol, England
- Glenside railway station, South Ayrshire, Scotland

=== United States ===
- Glenside, Pennsylvania, United States, in Montgomery County
- Glenside station, a regional rail station in Glenside, Pennsylvania

== Other uses ==
- CFAV Glenside (YTB 644), a Canadian Forces tugboat
