= HDU =

HDU may refer to:

- Hangzhou Dianzi University, in Hangzhou, China
- Hard disk drive
- Hồng Đức University, in Vietnam
- High dependency unit, a hospital facility
- High Dependency Unit (band), a New Zealand psychedelic rock band
- High dependency unit (mental health), a psychiatric treatment facility
- Croatian Phonographic Association (HDU, Hrvatska diskografska udruga) that publishes the Croatian music chart Top of the Shops
