= Glenside Hospital =

Glenside Hospital refers to multiple institutions:

- Glenside Hospital (Adelaide), former institution in Glenside, South Australia
- Glenside Hospital (Bristol), former institution on what is now the Glenside, Bristol campus of the University of the West of England
