= Green Lane Hospital =

Green Lane Hospital may refer to:

- Green Lane Hospital, Auckland, New Zealand
- Green Lane Hospital, Wiltshire, England
