= Barrow Hospital =

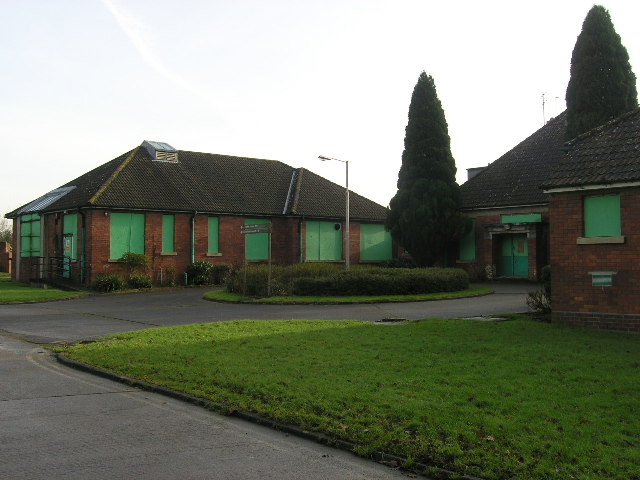
- Southside day hospital in 2006 prior to demolition

- Shown in Somerset

Geography
- Location: Barrow Gurney, Somerset, England, United Kingdom
- Coordinates: 51.4176°N 2.6630°W

Organisation
- Care system: Public NHS
- Type: Psychiatric

History
- Founded: 1938
- Closed: 2006

Links
- Lists: Hospitals in England

Barrow Hospital (sometimes referred to as Barrow Gurney Hospital, or Barrow Gurney Psychiatric Institution) was a psychiatric hospital in Barrow Gurney, Somerset, United Kingdom.

== Foundation ==
By the mid-1920s, the existing City of Bristol Mental Hospital at Stapleton was suffering from serious overcrowding. In addition, the Victorian hospital buildings were now considered too old-fashioned, having been built 'like large barracks' connected by corridors which allowed easy access for staff but provided 'little relief to those [patients] sensitive to their environment'. Extensions to the buildings helped to alleviate the problem to some extent, but it was still abundantly clear that a second hospital would soon be needed. The Bristol Corporation's preferred site was on the nearby Oldbury Court Estate, but when sale negotiations broke down in 1928 the Corporation was forced to look elsewhere and instead purchased 260 acres of woodland called The Wild Country near Barrow Gurney for £20,000.

== Design and construction ==
The new hospital was designed by Sir George Oatley of Bristol to the then-innovative colony plan based on detached 'villas' centred on a central cluster of service buildings. The plan called for 25 villas to house 1,200 patients, treatment centres for local authority and private patients, a chapel, recreation hall, laundry and central kitchens.

The buildings were austerely constructed of red brick with pantiled mansard roofs and were situated so as to give a sense of community and privacy as well as to take advantage of the wooded surroundings which were retained and enhanced by tree-thinning and landscaping.

Construction began in 1934 and although the hospital was not officially opened until 3 May 1939, Barrow Hospital received its first patients in May 1938 with the complex still only half-built. It was intended that the rest of the planned buildings should be gradually added over the following years as funds allowed, but the outbreak of war in September 1939 halted all work on site and the architect's full vision was never realised.

== Royal Naval Hospital ==
At the outbreak of the Second World War, the hospital was commandeered by the Royal Navy and became the Royal Naval Auxiliary Hospital, Barrow Gurney. The hospital treated seamen who had been injured during conflicts or who were suffering from psychological distress, brought in through the nearby Port of Bristol. In 1940, the daily average number of patients under treatment was 356 and the medical and nursing staff numbered 215. The Naval Hospital was decommissioned and returned to civilian use in 1946.

== Operation ==
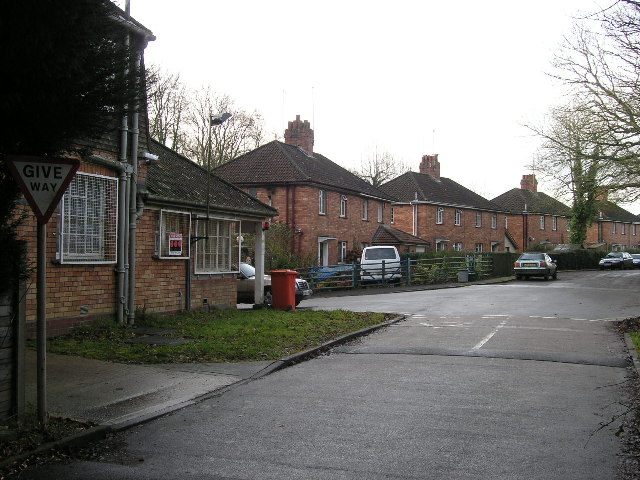
Staff cottages and entrance lodge lining the main drive in 2006

In July 1948, the hospital was transferred to National Health Service governance. Although the hospital lacked administrative offices, a chapel, recreation hall and laundry, facilities were soon improvised using a mixture of existing buildings and prefabricated structures. During this period, Barrow gained a reputation as a progressive hospital in the treatment of mental illness, accepting voluntary admissions and hosting clinical conferences for doctors from across the United Kingdom.

By the 1960s, however, some reports suggest that standards in the hospital had declined, with patients complaining of boredom, grim surroundings, urine-stained chairs and a distinct lack of comfort. Nonetheless, the hospital's pioneering work continued, including managing a day hospital near the centre of Bristol and helping to keep former patients in the community by providing home visits. The hospital suffered from relative isolation due to its rural setting and a lack of amenities (many of which had been planned but never built).

== Decline and closure ==
In 2003, the Avon and Wiltshire Mental Health Partnership NHS Trust announced its intention to close Barrow Hospital by 2008. By 2004 only three residential wards remained open. A report published by Mind in 2003 found that on the issue of the hospital's closure, opinion among patients was divided with groups of patients having strong feelings both for and against. In 2005, a national survey of hospital cleanliness named Barrow as the dirtiest in Britain after inspectors found cigarette burns on floors, graffiti on walls, urine stains around a toilet and stains from bodily fluids on the bottom of a hoist chair. The report, combined with the collapse of part of the ceiling onto the head of a patient the same year saw the closure plan brought forward and the last ward closed the following year.

== Redevelopment ==
After closure, the hospital buildings were largely neglected and began to decay. The site suffered extensively from looting, vandalism and graffiti and attracted urban explorers who documented its steady decay. In 2008, planning permission was granted build 18 luxury homes and 405,000 square feet (37,600 m^{2}) of office space on the southern part of the site. The following year saw the demolition of four villas, the former day hospital, mortuary, boilerhouse and a modern secure unit on the southern part of the site but the central and northern buildings were left standing. In 2009, redevelopment was called to a halt due to the discovery of roosting bats. A number of 'bat houses' have been constructed in an attempt to entice them out of the remaining buildings. In 2010, plans were amended to include a 220-bed care home 'village' on the northern part of the site, more housing and fewer offices. In March 2013, approximately half of the original hospital buildings were standing, albeit in a derelict state. Work had commenced on the redevelopment of the site. As of 2023, the hospital has been almost entirely demolished with the exception of the east villa and gatehouse.

== See also ==
- Healthcare in Bristol
- Callington Road Hospital
