= Healthcare in Bristol =

Healthcare in Bristol, England and the surrounding area has been the responsibility of one integrated care board (ICB) since July 2022. This replaced the former clinical commissioning group (CCG) of Bristol, North Somerset and South Gloucestershire.

The NHS Bristol, North Somerset and South Gloucestershire Integrated Care Board covers the areas administered by three local authorities: Bristol, North Somerset and South Gloucestershire.

== History ==
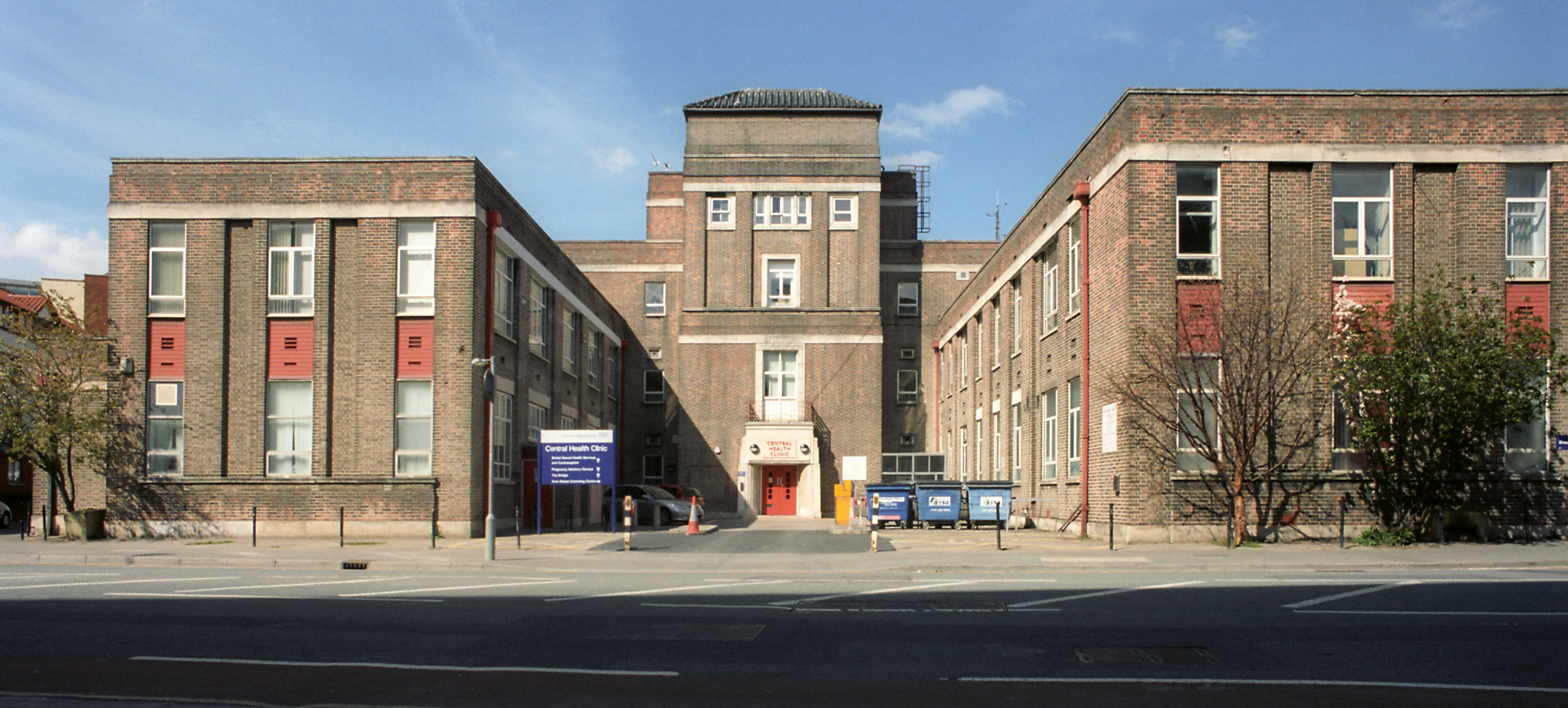
The Central Health Clinic, designed by C. F. W. Dening, opened in 1937

From 1947 to 1974, NHS services in Bristol were managed by the South-Western Regional Hospital Board. In 1974 the boards were abolished and replaced by Regional Health Authorities, with Bristol coming under the South Western RHA. Regions were reorganised in 1996 and Bristol came under the South and West (Wessex and South Western) Regional Health Authority. Bristol from 1974 was under Avon Area Health Authority divided into three district health authorities: Bristol and Weston, Southmead and Frenchay. This continued until 1993 when the three authorities were combined into Avon DHA, and area health authorities were abolished. Two primary care trusts (PCT) were established covering the whole county in 2002, Bristol North PCT and Bristol South and West PCT. They were merged to form Bristol PCT in 2006. The PCTs were managed by the South West strategic health authority from 2002 until 2013, when services were transferred to the new Bristol clinical commissioning group (CCG).

During the COVID-19 pandemic a temporary 300-bed NHS COVID-19 critical care hospital, one of seven NHS Nightingale Hospitals in England, was built at the Exhibition and Conference Centre of the University of the West of England. It would be ready for use from 25 April, but would only be used if needed during the peak of the outbreak.

== Commissioning ==
Bristol CCG took on the responsibilities of the former PCT on 1 April 2013. In August 2017, it announced plans to merge with the CCGs in North Somerset and South Gloucestershire. They started sharing a chief executive in February 2017. The three CCGs merged in April 2018 to form the Bristol, North Somerset and South Gloucestershire CCG which was abolished in 2022.

In September 2015, a survey by the Health Service Journal showed that 34 of 188 CCGs who responded to the survey had restricted access to some services. Restrictions were usually introduced by a number of CCGs acting together across an area. Gloucestershire and Bristol CCGs were proposing restricted access to acupuncture, adenoidectomy and post-operative physiotherapy.

=== Sustainability and transformation plans ===
Bristol, North Somerset and South Gloucestershire formed a sustainability and transformation plan area in March 2016, with Robert Woolley, Chief Executive of University Hospitals Bristol NHS Foundation Trust, as its leader.

The area faces a projected 2020/21 deficit of £305.5 million. The plan is to reduce the number of acute beds in the area by 30%. The commissioner deficit for 2017-18 was £90M, one of the largest, proportionally, in England. Bristol City Council refused to support plans to cut £305M from the Bristol area's NHS funding at its meeting in January 2017.

In 2018, Julia Ross was appointed joint STP lead, alongside Robert Woolley. She said in April 2018 that they were setting up six "locality provider groups" across the region to join up services for a defined population. This will start with GP and community services, probably in Weston.

== NHS trusts and hospitals ==
University Hospitals Bristol and Weston NHS Foundation Trust manages hospitals in the centre and south of the city, and at Weston-super-Mare.

- Bristol Royal Infirmary (has Accident & emergency, A&E)
  - Bristol Heart Institute
  - Bristol Haematology and Oncology Centre
- South Bristol Community Hospital
- Bristol Royal Hospital for Children (has A&E)
- St. Michael's Hospital (maternity services)
- Bristol Eye Hospital (has A&E daytime every day, eye only)
- University of Bristol Dental Hospital
- Central Health Clinic (clinics relating to sexual health and breast screening)
- Weston General Hospital

North Bristol NHS Trust manages hospitals in the north of Bristol and in South Gloucestershire.

- Southmead Hospital (has A&E)
- Cossham Memorial Hospital

Avon and Wiltshire Mental Health Partnership NHS Trust manages mental health services in the city.

- Blackberry Hill Hospital
- Callington Road Hospital
- Petherton Resource Centre
- Brookland Hall

From April to December 2014, Frenchay Hospital was progressively closed, with the majority of services moving to a new building at Southmead Hospital. A&E was transferred on 19 May 2014. Some services relating to brain and head injuries have remained at the site since December 2014.

== NHS Blood and Transplant ==
The Organ Donation and Transplantation Directorate of NHS Blood and Transplant is based in Stoke Gifford, Bristol. They also operate a permanent donor centre at Southmead Hospital.

== Private hospitals ==
- Spire Bristol Hospital
- Nuffield Health Bristol Hospital

== Primary care ==
There are 55 general practitioner (GP) practices in the county. Out-of-hours services are provided by Brisdoc, who also took over Bishopston Medical Practice in February 2018 after the partners resigned. It also runs Broadmead Medical Centre, Northville Family Practice, the homeless healthcare service and the GP support unit at Bristol Royal Infirmary.

Unity Sexual Health, a partnership between University Hospitals Bristol NHS Foundation Trust and several organisations, provides sexual health and pregnancy advice services at local clinics and at the Central Health Clinic.

A pilot scheme called the 'digital minor illness referral service' was launched in Bristol, North Somerset and South Gloucestershire in July 2019. General practitioners are encouraged to refer patients with low-acuity symptoms to community pharmacies, which are paid £14 for each consultation.

== Community care ==
Until 2013, community health services were run by the Primary Care Trust. Since then these services have been contracted out with adult and children's services being tendered separately. Bristol Community Health, a community interest company, were the new provider of adult community health services, and North Bristol NHS Trust continued to provide children's community health services, having originally won the contract for this in 2009.

Bristol Community Health remain the provider of adult community health services, however it was announced in August 2015 that North Bristol NHS Trust were not bidding to renew the contract for children's community health services because of the “non-core nature of the service”, a “lack of management capacity” and “financial pressure”. In October 2015, the new contract to provide these services in Bristol and South Gloucestershire was awarded to a partnership between Avon and Wiltshire Mental Health Partnership NHS Trust, Sirona Care & Health and Bristol Community Health.

Julia Ross, the newly appointed chief executive of Bristol, North Somerset and South Gloucestershire CCG said in April 2018 that community services in her patch should be consolidated into a single service.

== Healthwatch ==
Healthwatch Bristol is an organisation set up under the Health and Social Care Act 2012 to act as a voice for patients.

== Mental health ==
=== Adult services ===
There was long-standing unhappiness with mental health services in Bristol delivered by Avon and Wiltshire Mental Health Partnership NHS Trust (AWP), which was accused of being "centralist, top-down, target driven, bureaucratic and controlling" instead of putting patients first. The CCG have recommissioned services under the Bristol Mental Health brand. Bristol Mental Health is a consortium led by Avon and Wiltshire, working in partnership with nine third sector providers: Second Step; Missing Link; Off the Record (charity) Bristol; the Nilaari Agency; Stand Against Racisim and Inequality; Knowle West Health Park; Wellspring Healthy Living Centre; Southmead Development Trust; and Brunelcare.

There are seven service bundles. The CCG has a contract with each provider for each service bundle:

- community mental health services;
- community rehabilitation services;
- dementia wellbeing service;
- mental health employment service;
- assertive engagement service for people living chaotic lives;
- Bristol Sanctuary for people in severe emotional distress or early crisis; and
- community access service for harder to reach communities.

Bristol Mental Health commenced operation in October 2014.

=== Child services ===
Children’s community services are jointly commissioned by the CCGs and local authorities. Bristol City Council and South Gloucestershire jointly commission services for both areas, including community child health and Child and Adolescent Mental Health Services. The service is provided by the Community Children's Health Partnership, which is a partnership between Sirona Care & Health, Bristol Community Health, Avon and Wiltshire Mental Health Partnership NHS Trust and Barnardo's.

The North Bristol NHS Trust, in partnership with the Barnardo's charity, had provided the service from March 2009 to 2016. In 2015 the North Bristol NHS Trust announced that it would not continue the contract beyond March 2016, in order to focus on "acute and hospital based care".

=== Major service locations for mental health in Bristol ===
- Callington Road Hospital
- Blackberry Hill Hospital
- Southmead Hospital
- Petherton Resource Centre
- Brookland Hall
- Greenway Centre

== Closed hospitals ==
On 7 January 2013, the Bristol Homeopathic Hospital, founded in 1852 but with a history as a dispensary dating back to 1832, moved operations from its own building, Hampton House, to the South Bristol Community Hospital. In-patient services had been provided at Hampton House until 1986, when they were moved to the Bristol Eye Hospital, with out-patients continuing at Hampton House. Homeopathy services ceased at the South Bristol Community Hospital in October 2015, and in September 2018 CCGs in the area decided to cease funding homeopathy.

Bristol General Hospital closed in early April 2012, with services moved to Bristol Royal Infirmary and the newly opened South Bristol Community Hospital.

Until the changes brought in by the Care in the Community policy in the 1980s, the Bristol area had a number of hospitals for patients with a mental disorder or developmental disability, including Barrow Hospital, Brentry Hospital, Glenside Hospital, Hortham Hospital and Stoke Park Hospital.

Manor Park Hospital was the major geriatric hospital in South West England. In 1993, it merged with the residual mental health activities from the closing of Glenside Hospital, forming Blackberry Hill Hospital. Geriatric services were closed here in 2005, mainly leaving AWP operated mental health services at Blackberry Hill Hospital.

Brislington House (now known as Long Fox Manor) was built as a private lunatic asylum for the insane. When it opened in 1806, it was one of the first purpose built asylums in England. It is situated on the Bath Road in Brislington, although parts of the grounds cross the city boundary into the parish of Keynsham in Bath and North East Somerset. The Palladian fronted building was originally seven separate blocks into which patients were allocated depending on their class. The buildings, estate and therapeutic regime designed by Edward Long Fox was based on the principles of moral treatment which was fashionable at the time. Brislington House later influenced the design and construction of other asylums and influenced Acts of parliament. The house and ancillary structures are listed buildings which have now been converted into private residences. The original grounds are Grade II* listed on the Register of Historic Parks and Gardens of special historic interest in England and now include St. Brendan's Sixth Form College, sports pitches and some farmland. They are now included on the Heritage at Risk Register.
