= Wick, Devizes =

Coordinates: 51.343°N 01.999°W

Wick
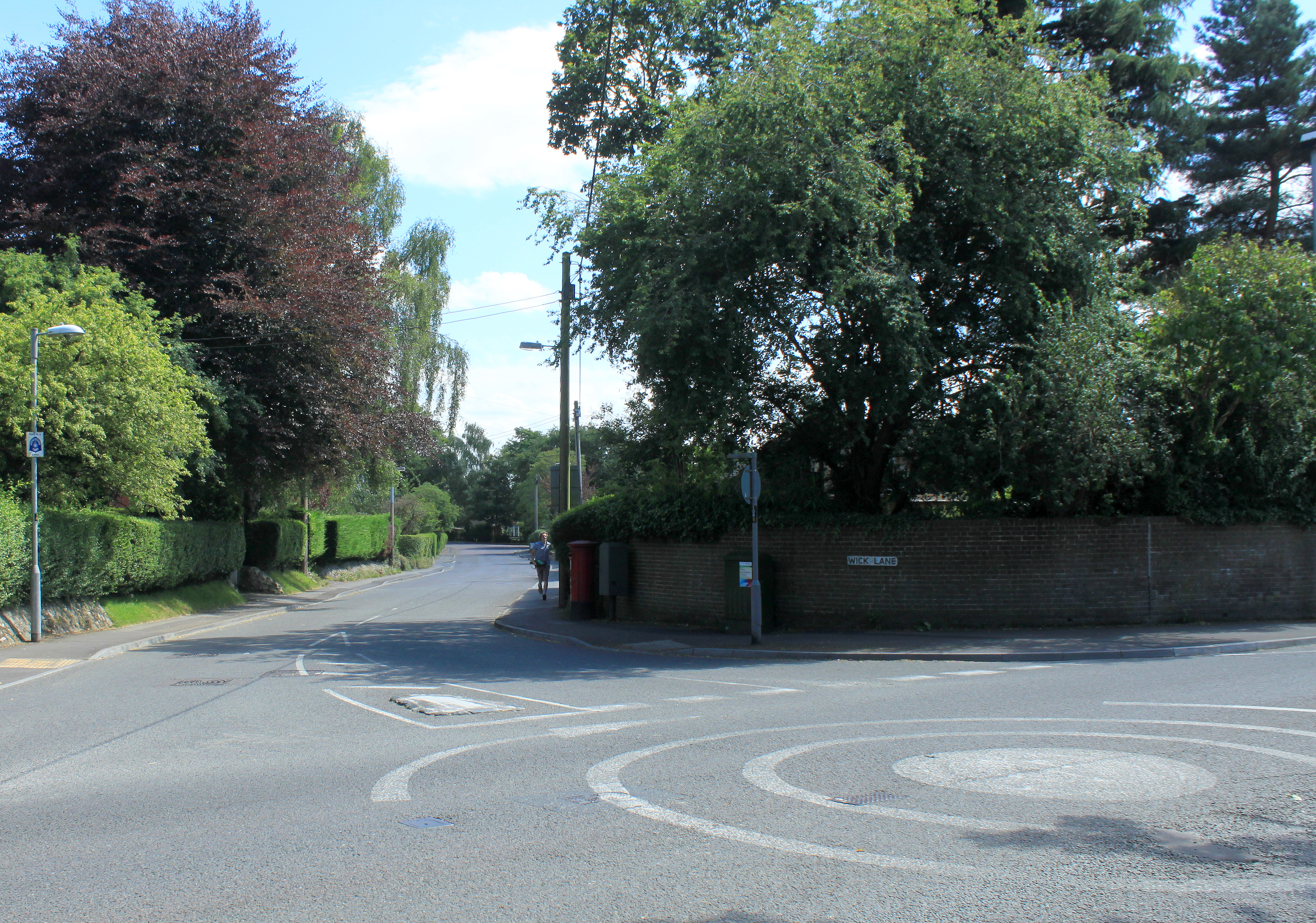
- Roundabout on the A360 in Wick Lane in 2012

- Location within Wiltshire
- Population: 1,548 (as of 1773)
- OS grid reference: SU005605
- Civil parish: Devizes
- Unitary authority: Wiltshire
- Ceremonial county: Wiltshire
- Region: South West
- Country: England
- Sovereign state: United Kingdom
- Post town: Devizes
- Postcode district: SN10
- Dialling code: 01380
- Police: Wiltshire
- Fire: Dorset and Wiltshire
- Ambulance: South Western
- UK Parliament: Melksham and Devizes

Wick is a suburb of Devizes in the English county of Wiltshire. Until around 1800, when expansion of Devizes turned it into a suburb, Wick was a village. The area is in the south of Devizes and lies west off the A360, which passes from Devizes to Salisbury.

== History ==
There was a Roman settlement at Wick apparently from the 2nd to the 4th century, around the area once occupied by Pans Lane Halt. There are also faint indications of another settlement on the green, and a cemetery on the site of Southbroom junior school.

Wick is first mentioned in 1249 and is called 'the Weke' in 1542. In 1736–7 the settlement consisted of Upper Wick and Wick but in 1759 Upper Wick no longer existed. In 1773 Wick was renamed Devizes Wick, to distinguish it from Potterne Wick, further to the south. In 1795–6 the hamlet contained between 30 and 33 assessable houses. Wick was later known for its dairy industry, none of which exists today.

Until its closure in 1964, Pans Lane Halt on the Devizes Branch Line served Roundway Hospital, a mental hospital which closed in 1995. The former hospital was converted for housing and Green Lane Hospital was built on part of its site.

== Today ==
Today Wick is an entirely residential area, including a school and hospital. The original housing was built around the 1900s and most of the new housing was developed in the 1950s and 1960s. The newest housing development in the Drews Pond area was built in 2007. There is little room for any more housing due to the awkward geography that situates Wick on the edge of Devizes hill. It is roughly 1 mile from the centre of town.

Most of the land surrounding Wick is woodland and arable. To the south of Wick is Drews Pond Forest, a popular place for walking.
