= Hồng Đức University =

University in Vietnam

Hong Duc University
- Motto in English: Sage - Innovation - Responsibility - Integration
- Type: Public university
- Established: 1997
- Rector: Associate Professor Bùi Văn Dũng
- Faculty: ~ 439
- Students: ~ 9,000
- Location: Thanh Hóa, Vietnam
- Website: eng.hdu.edu.vn

Hong Duc University (HDU; French: Université Hong Duc) is a public university in Vietnam, located in Thanh Hoa city, near Lam Son High School and Sầm Sơn Beach.

== Formation ==
The university was established on September 24, 1997 according to Decision No. 797/1997/QD-TTg issued by the Prime Minister. The school is named after the era name of the most prosperous emperor in the history of the nation, Lê Thánh Tông. The university was created by merging three colleges: College of Education, College of Economics - Technology, Medical College of Thanh Hoa. Hong Duc University is the first university in the Vietnamese higher education system to be established under a new model: a public, multi-disciplinary university, under the supervision of the People's Committee of Thanh Hoa province, under quality management of the Ministry of Education and Training.

== Infrastructure ==
After three stages of investment and construction, up to now, the facilities for professional activities of the university have been quite complete and modern. With a total area of 478,000 m2, of which the main campus is 384,000m2. the Center for Defense and Security Education 94,000m2, Hong Duc University is one of the higher education institutions.

== Academic program ==
The university's organization currently consists of 33 affiliated units, including 12 training faculties, ten offices, three boards, and seven centers and medical stations.

The school currently has nearly 740 staff and lecturers, of whom the full-time lecturers are two professors, 24 associate professors, and 175 doctors (the percentage of lecturers with doctorate degrees is 41.26%).

Hong Duc University is the first school in the country to introduce the Digital Technology module into teaching for all training programs.

The university cooperates with schools, institutes and organizations including University of Zielona Góra (Poland), Greifswald University, Anhalt University of Applied Sciences (Germany), Soongsil University (Korea), Aix-Marseille University (France)...

Lecturers of the university have implemented two international projects, eight state-level projects, including two independent projects and six projects under the National Science and Technology Development Fund (NAFOSTED); 38 ministerial-level projects; 56 provincial-level projects; and 533 grassroots-level projects. They have published 1,329 scientific research works in domestic and international specialized scientific journals. They have implemented 1,942 student scientific research projects, 328 of which were awarded university-level prizes and 32 ministerial-level projects, and four which received Vietnam technical innovation awards (VIFOTEC).

Students of the university have joined the Provincial Athlete's Delegation to attend the National Sports Congress and the Southeast Asian Championship. They have won many medals, including 16 gold, silver and bronze medals in taekwondo, vovinam, sepak takraw, wushu, kickboxing, and muay.

== Extracurriculars ==
Miss University is an annual event with the purpose of honoring the beauty of Vietnamese women and encouraging students to preserve and promote a model life.

Volunteer activities

The student union of Hong Duc University offers many volunteer activities for students, such as teaching languages to orphans or helping new students with enrollment exams for residents. Students may also help people in poor villages during summer vacation.

== Notable alumni ==
- Nguyễn Thị Hương, taekwondo
- Lê Thị Hiền, vovinam
- Vũ Tú, sculptor, Valedictorian HDU'11
