= Brookland Hall =

- Avon and Wiltshire Mental Health Partnership NHS Trust
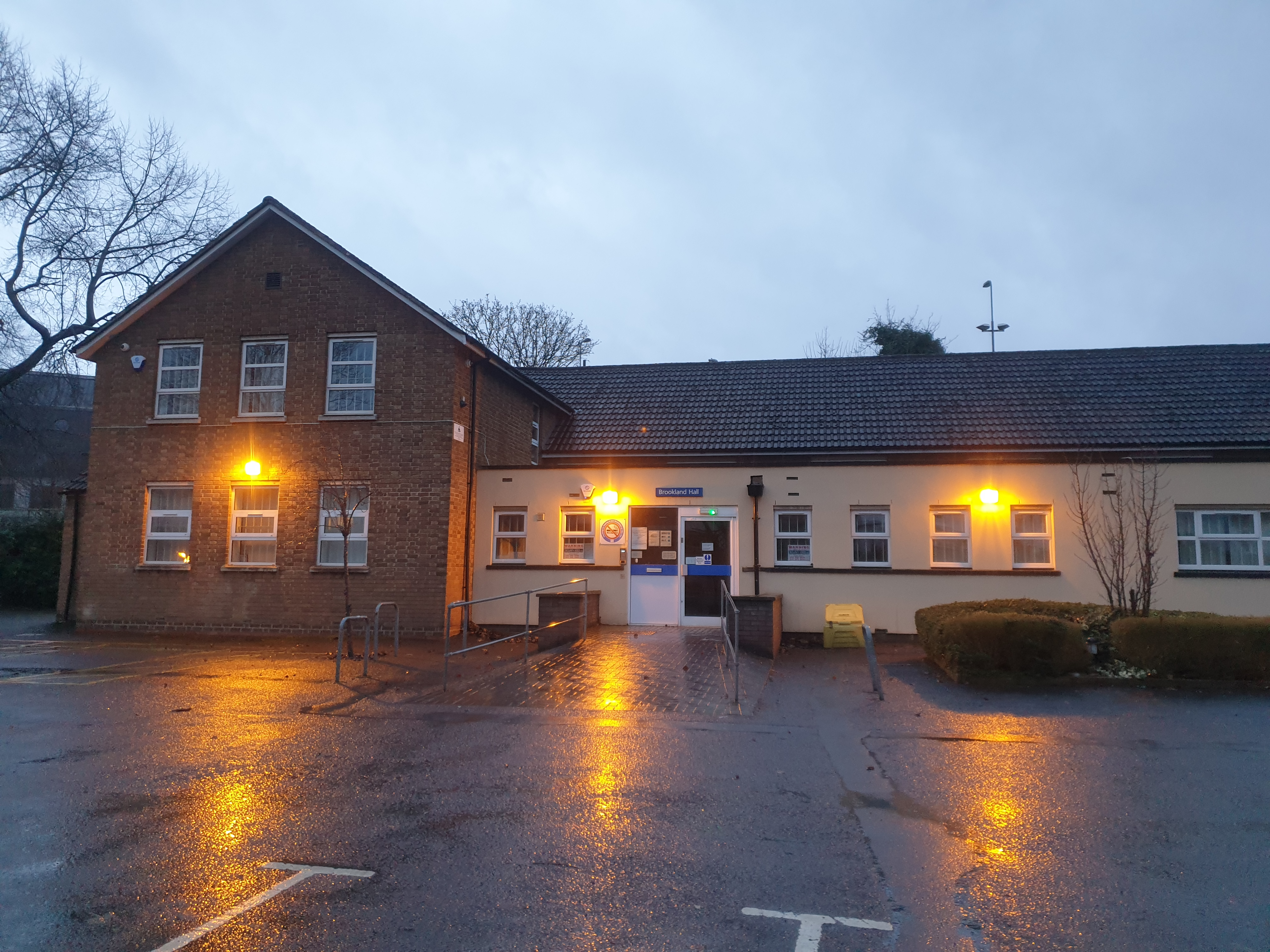

- "Location in Bristol"

Geography
- Location: St Werburghs, Bristol, England
- Coordinates: 51.466630°N 2.575121°W

Organisation
- Care system: NHS
- Type: Specialist

Services
- Emergency department: No
- Speciality: Day hospital

History
- Founded: Late 1970s

Links
- Website: www.awp.nhs.uk
- Lists: Hospitals in England

Brookland Hall is a centre for community mental health services in St Werburghs, Bristol, United Kingdom. It is managed by Avon and Wiltshire Mental Health Partnership NHS Trust.

== History ==
After the closure of Brookland Methodist Church on Conduit Place in 1971, the site was cleared and after the works on the M32 motorway were completed in 1975 the site was made available for the construction of a small community mental health facility.

== Services ==
Brookland Hall is the base for the following teams:

- Bristol Deaf Mental Health Services
- Bristol Primary Care Liaison Service

== See also ==
- Petherton Resource Centre - South Bristol services
- Healthcare in Bristol
