= Bristol Community Health =

Healthcare company in Bristol, England

Bristol Community Health was a Community Interest Company providing community health trust services to the people of Bristol, England, established under the Transforming Community Services initiative. It comprises the community services previously run by Bristol Primary Care Trust.

It won a contract to provide children's community services in Bristol and South Gloucestershire in October 2015 in conjunction with Sirona Care & Health, Avon and Wiltshire Mental Health Partnership NHS Trust and Barnardo's.

It was shortlisted for two awards at the 2015 Social Enterprise UK Awards in November 2015 - both Health and Social Care and UK Social Enterprise of the Year. In 2017 the services provided were rated as good by the Care Quality Commission.
