= Sirona Care & Health =

Community Interest Company

Sirona care & health CIC is a Community Interest Company based in Bristol, North Somerset and South Gloucestershire which provides publicly funded health services.

It was established in October 2011 under the provisions of the Companies (Audit, Investigations and Community Enterprise) Act 2004 as part of the Transforming Community Services

== Services ==
In 2013, Sirona won a contract for specialist healthcare services for people with learning difficulties in South Gloucestershire which resulted in the transfer of 50 people from Bristol Community Health. In April 2014, the company won a contract to provide other adult community healthcare services in South Gloucestershire and 450 people transferred in from North Bristol NHS Trust. In October 2015, it won a contract to provide children's community services in Bristol and South Gloucestershire in conjunction with Bristol Community Health and Avon and Wiltshire Mental Health Partnership NHS Trust.

Apprenticeships have been offered by the company in various areas connected with social care.

In November 2016, Sirona lost a bid for a £700 million seven-year contract to run health and social care services in Bath and North East Somerset to Virgin Care. The contract involved coordinating more than 200 health and social care services. Many of Sirona's staff transferred to Virgin Care under the Transfer of Undertakings (Protection of Employment) (TUPE) regulations.

In 2019, it won a ten-year £1.2 billion adult community services contract in Bristol, North Somerset and South Gloucestershire to start in April 2020. Previously it had provided the service jointly with Bristol Community Health and North Somerset Community Partnership.

== See also ==
- Healthcare in Somerset
- Healthcare in Bristol
- Healthcare in Gloucestershire
