= Donal F. Early =

Irish psychiatrist (1917–2004)

Dr Donal F. Early
- Born: 20 May 1917; Roscommon, Ireland
- Died: 12 April 2004 (aged 86); Bristol, England
- Occupation: Psychiatrist

Dr. Donal F. Early (20 May 1917 in Roscommon, Ireland – 12 April 2004 in Bristol, England) was an Irish psychiatrist.

Early qualified LRCPI and LM from the College of Surgeons medical school in Dublin in 1941. In 1944, he joined the staff at Bristol Mental Hospital and was a consultant psychiatrist at Glenside from the 1950s. He founded the Glenside Museum.

He had a particular interest in rehabilitation and industrial therapy, and became a World Health Organization advisor in Industrial Rehabilitation.

After his retirement, Early became actively involved in providing psychiatric reports for the Court, and in 2003 he published The Lunatic Pauper Palace, documenting the history of Glenside Hospital Bristol from 1861 to 1994.
