= Roundway Hospital =

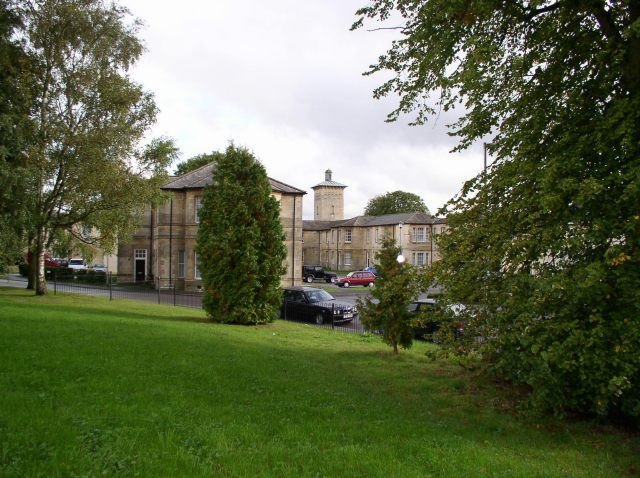
- A view of the former hospital, now private residences

- Showing site of former Roundway Hospital

Geography
- Location: Roundway, Wiltshire, England
- Coordinates: 51.3393°N 1.9876°W

Organisation
- Care system: UK:NHS from 1948
- Type: Specialist

Services
- Speciality: Psychiatry

History
- Founded: 1849
- Closed: 1995

Roundway Hospital was a psychiatric hospital in the parish of Roundway near Devizes, Wiltshire, England. It was originally called the Wiltshire County Lunatic Asylum and later the Wiltshire County Mental Hospital. It opened in 1851 and closed in 1995.

== History ==
=== Construction and inauguration ===
The hospital was conceived in 1848 by a committee of justices chaired by Sir John Wither Awdry for "providing an asylum for the pauper lunatics of the county of Wiltshire alone". Forty-eight acres of land was purchased from Mr T. H. S. Southeron at the end of Pans Lane in the parish of Roundway. The money was raised by loans from the government and other subscribers, to be paid back over 21 years. Construction was started in 1849. The architect was Thomas Henry Wyatt, well known for his institutional architecture. The style was Italianate and the first phase cost £19,594. Construction was by T & W Piper, and the addition of ironwork by Knight & Co. for railings around the buildings cost a further £1,069. The principal building material was stone from the Murhill quarries near Winsley, and the roof slates came from Wales. The quarries were conveniently placed about 15 miles away along the Kennet and Avon Canal, which had opened some 50 years earlier. The slates were likewise transported by canal.

=== Developments in structure ===
The hospital was called the Wiltshire County Lunatic Asylum when it received its first inmates on 19 September 1851. When the hospital was first constructed it was insufficient to meet demand and extensions were added. This happened regularly as the population grew and it was only during the 1940s that no building extensions were added.

1858 saw a new female ward built, and in 1863–66 three more wards were added. Further wards were added in 1877. In 1890 a third storey was added to the main building. A house called Campfield House was built for the Physician Superintendent in 1892 and a recreation hall and engine room were added in 1898; in the same year the power source changed from gas to electricity. In 1922 the name of the hospital was changed to Wiltshire County Mental Hospital. In 1927 accommodation for nurses was built. 1935 saw a further building programme to increase accommodation and in 1937 the hospital chapel was completed.

=== Management and treatments ===
The first Medical Superintendent was Dr. Thurnham, a liberal Quaker and well respected psychiatrist born near York and who had spent some years at the York Retreat. He was appointed in 1849 to enable him to work with Wyatt on the construction of the building. The hospital from its inception was managed by the Wiltshire Court of Quarter Sessions. In 1853 about 200 of the total of 333 patients were occupied on the hospital farm, in the kitchen, chopping wood or stonebreaking.

By 1880 cricket, bowls, country walks, theatricals and "Christy Minstrels" style shows were available for the patients. In 1889 the hospital became the responsibility of Wiltshire County Council. In 1912 there were about 1,000 patients in the hospital, with seclusion and restraints still in common use, and some patients were transferred to the Dorset County Asylum in Dorchester to relieve the overcrowding. From 1915 to 1920 the hospital was afflicted with outbreaks of tuberculosis and dysentery, which led to a negative inspectors' report. An innovation in the early 1920s was the use of warm baths lasting up to seven hours, with the patient under a sheet and with boards across the bath to facilitate meals. In 1928 occupational therapy was started, and in 1930 social workers were employed. 1930 also saw the Mental Treatment Act 1930, which affected the rights of patients and reinforced the idea that asylums were hospitals.

During the 1930s, patients were attending entertainments outside the hospital, a "talking cinema apparatus" was installed in the hospital, and there was a canteen and library for patient use. Patients had also formed their own football and cricket teams. Electroconvulsive therapy was introduced in 1942, followed by the first prefrontal leucotomy operation in the hospital in 1946. In 1947 the National Health Service was established throughout the United Kingdom, and in 1948 the management of the hospital was transferred to the Ministry of Health.

By the 1950s the hospital population was no longer increasing, and there were about 1,300 beds. Some patients were transferred to the Old Manor Hospital in Salisbury and some to Old Park House, a large residential home in Devizes and a recent purchase by the Ministry of Health to provide better accommodation. It was managed from Roundway. Inspection reports mention less crowding and everything satisfactory.

=== The final years ===
The 1950s saw the introduction of insulin coma therapy and antidepressants. The Mental Health Act 1959 brought further changes to the management of hospitals and patients. The laws relating to the detention of patients changed: all patients were deemed 'informal' and free to leave, with special procedures necessary to specifically detain a patient if required. There was a trend to move mental care away from large institutions and this coincided with the development of modern effective antipsychotic drugs.

By the 1960s the number of beds had been reduced to 800, and up to 300 patients were earning a small wage working in a rehabilitative factory managed by a local firm. The 1970s saw a further move to discharge people into the community, formalized in 1983 as the government policy of Care in the Community.

The decision to close Roundway Hospital was finally made in the late 1980s, and in 1995 the remaining patients were transferred to the newly built Green Lane Hospital nearby. Roundway Hospital was decommissioned, and the land and buildings were sold for housing development.

Some of the hospital's records are held at the Wiltshire and Swindon History Centre.

== See also ==
- List of hospitals in England
