= Blackberry Hill Hospital =

- Avon and Wiltshire Mental Health Partnership NHS Trust
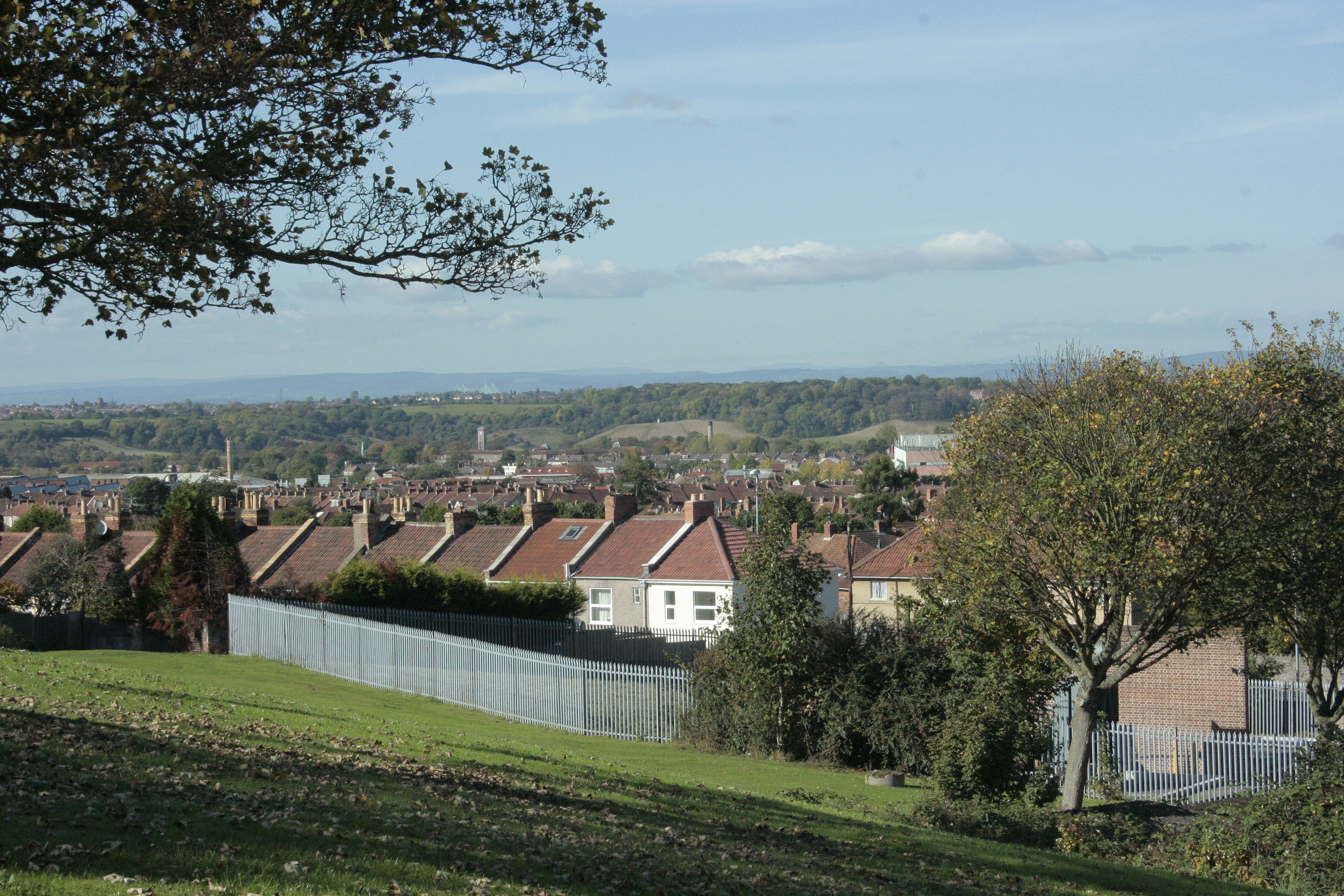
- The clock tower and grey stone buildings of Blackberry Hill Hospital can be seen in the middle distance

- Location within Bristol

Geography
- Location: Bristol, United Kingdom
- Coordinates: 51.4849°N 2.5407°W

Organisation
- Care system: Public NHS
- Type: Psychiatric hospital

Services
- Emergency department: No Accident & Emergency

History
- Founded: 1779

Links
- Lists: Hospitals in the United Kingdom

Blackberry Hill Hospital is an NHS psychiatric hospital in Fishponds, Bristol, England, specialising in forensic mental health services, operated by the Avon and Wiltshire Mental Health Partnership NHS Trust. The hospital also offers drug and alcohol rehabilitation inpatient services, and is the base for a number of community mental health teams.

Opened as a prison in 1779, many of its buildings and the co-located Glenside campus of the University of the West of England (UWE) are Grade II listed. From 1948 until 2005, the site was also a geriatric hospital, for many of those years being the major geriatric hospital in South West England. In 2009, 21 acres (8.5 ha) of the site, incorporating the oldest buildings, was sold to the UK Government's Homes and Communities Agency, for redevelopment as part of a wider regeneration project.

== History ==
=== Stapleton Prison ===
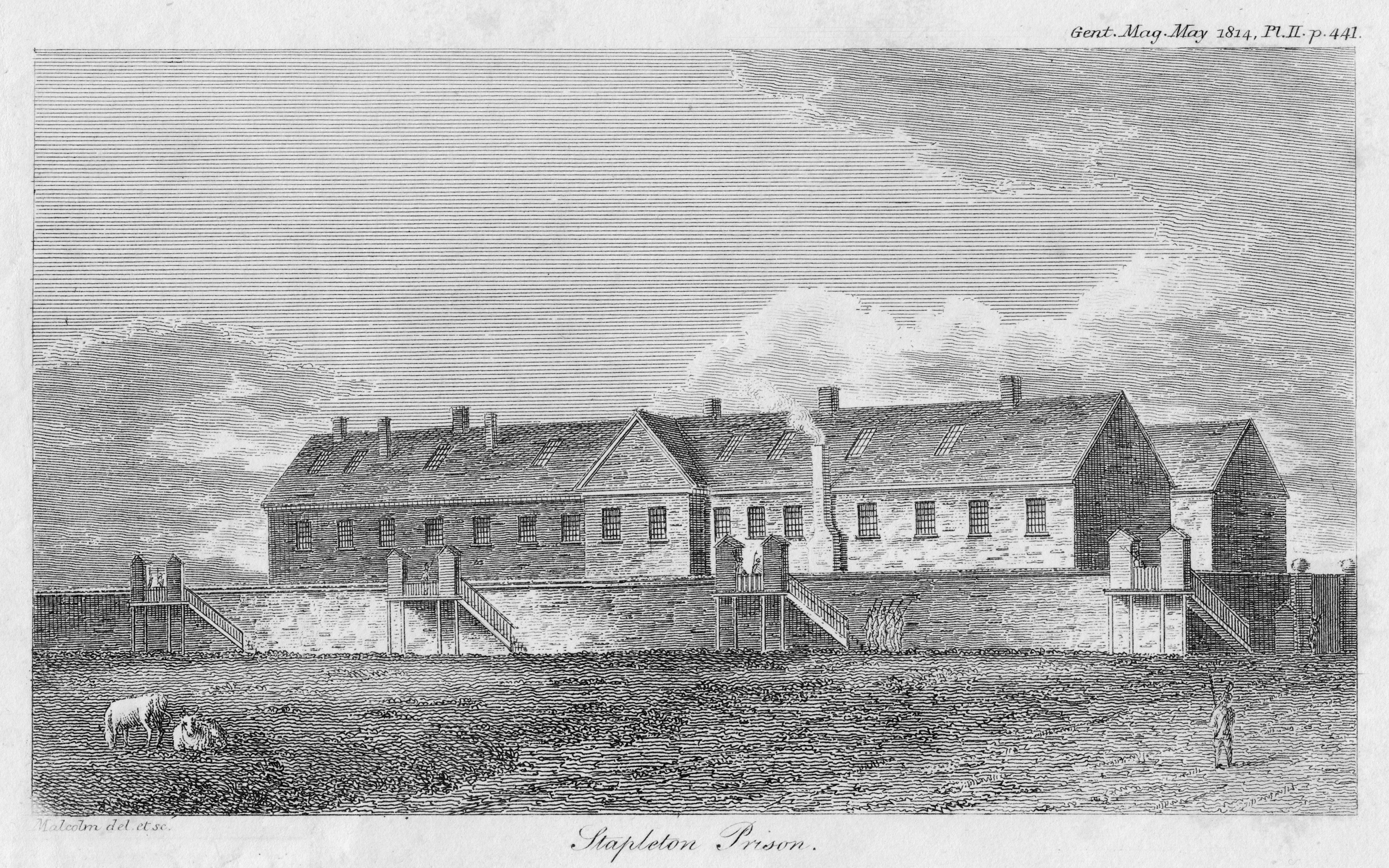
Stapleton Prison in 1814

The site first came into use as a prison in 1779, during the American Revolutionary War, when it was developed to house Dutch and Spanish prisoners of war who had been landed at Bristol Docks. After George III recognised the 13 United States of America as free and independent in 1783, the prisoners were sent home.

The site formally adopted the title 'Stapleton Prison', but was under utilised in civilian use, and was again expanded from 1793 after the commencement of the Napoleonic Wars. A third prison building was completed in 1804, used most recently as nurses' accommodation. After the Treaty of Paris of 1814, the prisoners were again repatriated.

Writing in London Labour and the London Poor, published in 1862, Henry Mayhew recounted a letter sent by the secretary of the Bristol Society for the Suppression of Vice in 1808: 'Sir, I took my horse and rode to Stapleton prison ... Inclosed are some of the drawings which I purchased in what they call their market ... They wished to intrude on me a variety of devices in bone and wood of the most obscene kind ... I purchased a few, but they are too bulky for a letter. This market is held before the door of the turnkey every day between the hours of ten and twelve.’

=== Stapleton Workhouse ===
Used as a naval stores, and then a school for naval boys, after a cholera outbreak in 1834 led to overcrowding of Bristol's first workhouse at St Peter's Hospital, the Bristol Corporation of the Poor rented the old prison. After purchasing the site in 1837, they began to make alterations, adding to the walls separating the different sections of the site. In 1861, they demolished many of the oldest prison buildings, and built the main structure of what later become Blackberry Hill Hospital. On the 1880 Ordnance Survey map it is shown as the Bristol Union Workhouse.

=== Stapleton Institution ===
At the start of the First World War, the site was turned over to become Stapleton Institution for the Maintenance and Workshop Training of Certified Mental Defectives. The facility housed and then trained those assessed as mentally defective in domestic and industrial crafts, so that they could be deployed in the war effort. After the end of hostilities, these housing and post-assessment training activities continued.

=== Stapleton Hospital ===
After the Second World War, the National Health Service Act 1946 turned the informal retention activity into a full mental health facility, under the title Stapleton Hospital. Records show that on take over by the NHS, the facility was caring for 837 patients: 350 under the Mental Treatment Act 1930; 152 mentally handicapped; 80 social misfits. Even after takeover, the previous regime stayed in place, with patients assessed as capable enough working for their keep in the hospital's kitchens, bakery and for local farms. However, in 1948 it became Stapleton Hospital for Geriatric Illness.

=== Manor Park Hospital ===
Renamed under the NHS reforms of 1956, Manor Park Hospital retained its geriatric illness brief. The hospital was staffed by eight consultancy teams, and much of its workhouse-related architecture was removed, reducing ward sizes, and replacing farming and work areas with gardens. In the 1960s Manor Park Hospital was the major geriatric hospital in South West England. Patient turnover rose despite bed numbers gradually declining from about 650, to about 430 in 1977, due to length of stays decreasing.

=== Blackberry Hill Hospital ===
From January 1993, the hospital site merged with the adjacent Glenside Hospital, originally built as a lunatic asylum, to become the jointly named Blackberry Hill Hospital. Patients of Glenside were assessed for capability, with many placed within the Care in the Community programme, while the residual were moved into new buildings constructed on the former Manor Park site for their long term care.

==== Geriatric services ====
Geriatric services were initially run by the Frenchay Healthcare Trust, which took in patients from a wide area. In 1997, the newly created North Bristol NHS Trust (NBT), merging the operations of Frenchay Hospital and Southmead Hospital, took over the running of these services and focused on patients from the trust catchment area.

In June 2005, NBT closed inpatient services at Blackberry Hill Hospital, transferring most services to Frenchay Hospital and Southmead Hospital, with the objective of improving services while reducing costs. Stroke services, orthopedic rehabilitation services, dementia services and intermediate care services were moved from Blackberry Hill Hospital.

A small respite care service was transferred to Thornbury Hospital. Associated with the move, an inpatient service for elderly mental health patients run by Avon and Wiltshire Mental Health Partnership Trust (AWP) at Blackberry Hill was enlarged in size. Some geriatric outpatient services remained at the site, including the Memory Service. However, in 2006 AWP took over the running of the Memory Service, following the national model of Mental Health Trusts running this service. A charity for research into Alzheimer's disease, BRACE, and the Regional Quality Control Laboratories continued to use the site under a lease from NBT until July 2010.

==== Psychiatric services ====
In 2005, AWP created, two new secured facilities at Blackberry Hill. The first was a refurbishment of the secure in-patient care facility to create the Wickham Unit (or Wickham Low Secure Service). The second in new buildings to the rear of the site provided a medium secure facility, known as Fromeside (or Fromeside Medium Secure Unit).

In 1996, the Avon and Gloucestershire College of Health (along with the Bath and Swindon College of Health Studies) became part of the University of the West of England (UWE), and the Glenside site became the UWE Faculty of Health and Social Care. In 2013, AWP was given a formal warning by the Care Quality Commission over low staffing levels at its medium-secure unit on the site.

=== Redevelopment ===
In 2005, North Bristol NHS Trust transferred most of their remaining services to Frenchay and Southmead Hospitals. In 2007, they declared the Blackberry Hill site surplus to requirements, while AWP moved some of its older people services to Callington Road and Southmead hospitals. After transferring their 10% interest in the site to NBT, AWP adult mental health services were moved to the most modern buildings at the rear of the hospital site.

In 2009, the residual 21 acres (8.5 ha) Blackberry Hill site was sold to the UK Government's Homes and Communities Agency to be redeveloped as part of a wider regeneration project. The buildings which are mainly Grade II listed will be converted into a mixed-use development of flats, houses, shops and small business premises. In 2017, it was announced that 346 houses would be built on the site.

== See also ==
- Healthcare in Bristol
- Glenside, Bristol
