= Green Lane Hospital, Wiltshire =

Green Lane Hospital
- Avon and Wiltshire Mental Health Partnership NHS Trust
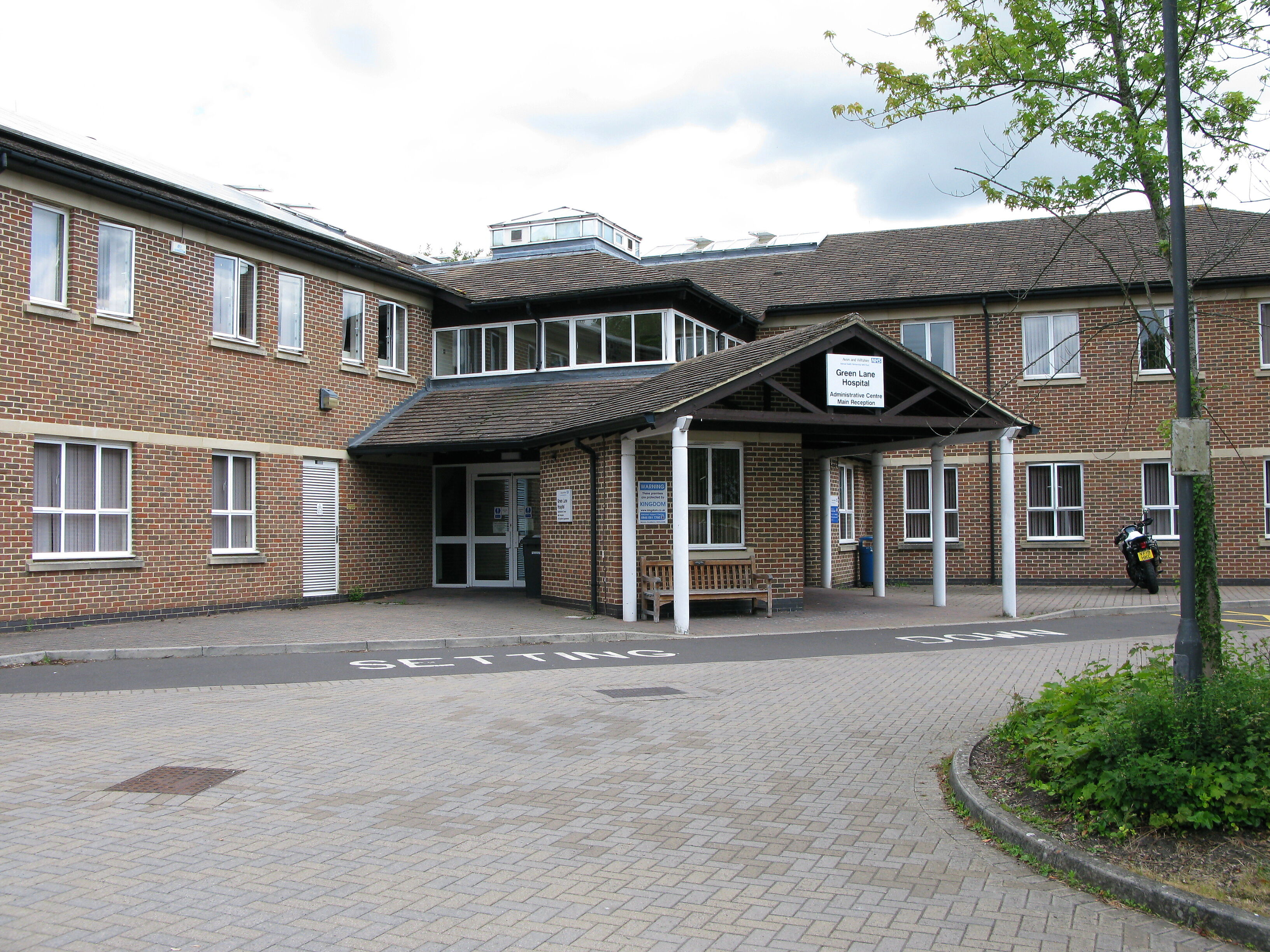
- Entrance to administration building

- Location in Wiltshire

Geography
- Location: Green Lane, Devizes SN10 5DS, Wiltshire, England, United Kingdom
- Coordinates: 51.3391°N 1.9814°W

Organisation
- Care system: Public NHS

Services
- Emergency department: No Accident & Emergency

History
- Founded: 1990

Links
- Website: www.awp.nhs.uk
- Lists: Hospitals in England

Green Lane Hospital is a psychiatric hospital in the Wick district of Devizes in Wiltshire, England. It is managed by the Avon and Wiltshire Mental Health Partnership NHS Trust.

== History ==
The hospital was built in 1990 in the grounds of Roundway Hospital, which closed in 1995. In 2008 permission was granted by the Wiltshire PCT to relocate its several local clinics into one centralised primary care centre and Green Lane is one of three prospective sites.

In 2011 the hospital achieved an excellent rating in an Electroconvulsive Therapy Accreditation Service audit. At that time the hospital carried out about 600 electroconvulsive therapy treatments per year.

The Daisy Unit, a ward for a small number of adults with learning disabilities and challenging behaviours was added in 2016.
