= Avon and Wiltshire Mental Health Partnership NHS Trust =

UK public sector healthcare provider in Wiltshire, England

- Type: Mental health trust
- Established: 1 April 2001
- Headquarters: Combe Park, Bath
- Region served: Bath and North East Somerset, Bristol, North Somerset, South Gloucestershire, Wiltshire
- Chair: Charlotte Hitchings
- Chief executive: Dominic Hardisty
- Website: www.awp.nhs.uk

Avon and Wiltshire Mental Health Partnership NHS Trust (AWP) is an NHS mental health trust providing adult mental health and related services in Wiltshire and the former county of Avon, an area centred on Bristol.

== Trust services ==
The trust is headquartered in Bath, and offers services at a large number of sites including at Blackberry Hill Hospital, Callington Road Hospital, Green Lane Hospital, Petherton Day Hospital, Royal United Hospital, St Martin's Hospital, Savernake Hospital, Southmead Hospital, Weston General Hospital and Fountain Way in Salisbury. The trust provided services to a population of 1.6 million people in 2010. It is organised into five strategic business units:

- Adult services
- Older people's services
- Specialist drug and alcohol services
- Specialised and secure services
- Research and development

== History ==
Avon and Wiltshire Mental Health Partnership NHS Trust was established as the Bath Mental Health Care NHS Trust, on 1 November 1991. Its name was changed on 1 April 1999 to the Avon and Western Wiltshire Mental Health Trust. The Trust's name was again changed, on 1 April 2001, to Avon and Wiltshire Mental Health Partnership NHS Trust, following the merger of Avon and Western Wiltshire Mental Health Trust with services in Swindon and South Wiltshire.

In 2005, after an announced Healthcare Commission inspection, AWP's Barrow Hospital ranked bottom in the commission's table of hospital cleanliness. The hospital, which was due to close the following year, closed three wards and reorganised housekeeping services.

In 2008, the Care Quality Commission (CQC) rated mental health services run by the trust as weak overall, along with ten other mental health trusts nationally. A 2012 CQC routine review found that the trust failed in four out of five inspection areas, and had insufficient experienced staff to meet needs. In 2013, the CQC identified the trust as one of eight mental health trusts with units that had dangerous staffing levels. In 2014, following an inspection, the CQC issued four warning notices to the trust requiring urgent action.

Following a 2012 NHS South of England review of the trust that concluded that "there is an urgent need to change the culture and leadership from one of central control to one in which all staff are positively engaged and involved in determining and delivering safe, high quality care", the trust appointed a new chairman and chief executive.

The trust was ordered to make urgent improvements to the safety of some of its services by the CQC in September 2014, after they found widespread inadequate staffing at inpatient units and a failure to investigate and learn from patient safety incidents.

Hayley Richards is retiring as chief executive in May 2019, and will be replaced by Dominic Hardisty, previously Chief Operating Officer and Deputy Chief Executive at Oxford Health NHS Foundation Trust. Prior to the arrival of Hardisty, Simon Truelove, the trust's Director of Finance, will act as the interim CEO.

== Bristol Mental Health ==
In April 2013, the new Bristol Clinical Commissioning Group announced that following complaints from staff and patients in Bristol, it would re-procure adult out-patients mental health services in Bristol from autumn 2014, enabling alternative providers to bid to operate the service which was contributing about £40 million to AWP's income.

A partnership of AWP, Second Step, Missing Link and seven voluntary sector organisations, called Bristol Mental Health, was awarded the contract. Different organisations will be responsible for each of six areas of the service. Bristol Mental Health commenced operation in October 2014.

== Children's community services ==
The trust in conjunction with other partners won a contract to provide children's community services in Bristol and South Gloucestershire in October 2015, after North Bristol NHS Trust announced it would give up the contract. The service is provided by the Community Children's Health Partnership, which is a partnership between Sirona Care & Health, Bristol Community Health, Barnardo's and AWP.

== Learning Disability and Autism Services ==
In June 2024, the trust closed their only Learning Disability Ward, The Daisy, at Green Lane Hospital, Devizes. The Daisy, initially costing £3million had only been open for 9 years prior to closing and was built in response to the BBC Panorama investigation into the abuse of patients at Winterbourne View

In 2024, the trust failed to secure the contract to deliver specialist learning disability, autism and ADHD community services in Bath and North East Somerset, Swindon and Wiltshire following an unsuccessful joint bid with the three local hospital trusts. The contract awarded to HCRG Care Group Limited, who took over the running of BSW community services in April 2025.

A new learning disability and autism mental health unit, The Kingfisher, is due to open in February 2025 at Blackberry Hill Hospital

== See also ==
- List of NHS trusts
- Healthcare in Bristol
- Healthcare in Somerset
- Healthcare in Wiltshire
