= Lam Son High School =

Lam Son High School for the Gifted
- Thanh Hoa; Vietnam

Information
- Type: Public
- Established: 1931
- Principal: Nguyễn Thanh Sơn
- Enrollment: 1058 (as of 2006)
- Website: thptchuyenlamson.vn

Lam Son High School for the Gifted (Vietnamese: Trường Trung Học Phổ Thông Chuyên Lam Sơn) is a public high school in Thanh Hoa, Vietnam. Established in 1931 with the name of Collège de Thanh Hoa, the school is one of the oldest schools still operating in Vietnam and is the first high school in Thanh Hoa. The school's name has been subsequently changed to Collège de Dao Duy Tu (1943–1950), and then its current name since 1950.

Similar to other schools for the gifted in Vietnam, Lam Son High School is the only specialized school in Thanh Hoa Province with the aim to nurture students who excelled in sciences and foreign languages.

== Recognitions ==
Over the years, Lam Son High School has been awarded various titles and medals by the President and Prime Minister of Vietnam.

- Third-grade Labor Medal in 1989
- Second-grade Labor Medal in 1995
- Third-grade Independence Medal in 1999
- Labor Hero title in 2000

== Achievements at International Science Olympiad ==
The following students from Lam Son High School have won medals at the International Science Olympiad.

Full name	Year	Host country	Subject	Medal
Nguyễn Thúc Anh	1984	Czechoslovakia	Mathematics	Bronze
Nguyễn Văn Quang	1987	Cuba	Mathematics	Bronze
Vũ Xuân Hạ	1990	China	Mathematics	Bronze
Đỗ Ngọc Minh	1991	Sweden	Mathematics	Silver
Ngô Diên Hy	1991	Sweden	Mathematics	Silver
Bùi Anh Văn	1993	Turkey	Mathematics	Silver
Cao Văn Hạnh	1995	Canada	Mathematics	Silver
Nguyễn Duy Hùng	1996	Russia	Chemistry	Bronze
Nguyễn Như Thông	1996	Russia	Chemistry	Bronze
Đỗ Quang Yên	1998	Taiwan	Mathematics	Silver
Vũ Thị Lan Hương	1998	Australia	Chemistry	Silver
Đỗ Quang Yên	1999	Romania	Mathematics	Gold
Đào Vĩnh Ninh	1999	Thailand	Chemistry	Silver
Nguyễn Phi Lê	2000	South Korea	Mathematics	Silver
Nguyễn Thành Vinh	2000	Denmark	Chemistry	Silver
Lê Tuấn Anh	2001	India	Chemistry	Silver
Lê Đình Hùng	2001	USA	Mathematics	Silver
Tống Văn Trọng	2002	Indonesia	Physics	Bronze
Lê Ngọc Anh	2008	Spain	Mathematics	Gold
Hoàng Đức Ý	2008	Spain	Mathematics	Gold
Hoàng Ngọc Hưng	2009	Bulgaria	Informatics	Bronze
Nguyễn Thị Như Quỳnh	2009	Japan	Biology	Bronze
Nguyễn Đức Bình	2010	Japan	Chemistry	Silver
Nguyễn Hoành Đạo	2010	Croatia	Physics	Bronze
Lê Huy Quang	2011	Thailand	Physics	Bronze
Lê Quang Lâm	2012	Argentina	Mathematics	Bronze
Lê Huy Quang	2012	Estonia	Physics	Silver
Lê Xuân Mạnh	2013	Australia	Informatics	Bronze
Mỵ Duy Hoàng Long	2013	Denmark	Physics	Silver
Lê Duy Anh	2013	Denmark	Physics	Bronze
Nguyễn Đắc Hiếu	2016	Vietnam	Biology	Bronze
Hoàng Anh Dũng	2016	Hong Kong	Mathematics	Silver
Nguyễn Khánh Duy	2016	Gruzia	Chemistry	Gold
Dương Tiến Quang Huy	2017	United Kingdom	Biology	Silver
Lê Quang Dũng	2017	Brazil	Mathematics	Gold
Hoàng Minh Trung	2018	Islamic Republic of Iran	Biology	Gold
Nguyễn Ngọc Long	2018	Portugal	Physics	Gold
Nguyễn Văn Chí Nguyên	2018	Slovakia - Czech Republic	Chemistry	Silver
Nguyễn Khánh Linh	2019	Israel	Physics	Gold
Hoàng Minh Trung	2019	Hungary	Biology	Silver
Nguyễn Văn Chí Nguyên	2019	France	Chemistry	Gold
Trịnh Hữu Gia Phúc	2019	Azerbaijan	Informatics	Gold
Nguyễn Lê Nhất Duy	2021	Lithuania	Physics	Silver

== Principals ==
School year	Principal
1931–1931	Eugène Le Bris
1931–1934	Henri Greori
1934–1942	Thái Nguyên Đào
1942–1942	Phạm Văn Diệu
1942–1946	Ưng Quả
1946–1954	Đoàn Nồng
1954–1957	Lê Văn Uôn
1957–1957	Nguyễn Văn Tiêu
1957–1964	Cao Hữu Nhu
1964–1967	Lê Hữu Loạt
1967–1979	Vũ Lê Thống
1979–1983	Đào Trọng Mão
1983–1984	Vũ Lê Thống
1984–1992	Đào Trọng Mão
1992–1997	Mai Xuân Hảo
1997–1998	Nguyễn Hữu Lợi
1998–2003	Phạm Ngọc Quang
2003–2013	Kim Ngọc Chính
2014–2015	Lê Văn Hoa
2015–2022	Chu Anh Tuấn
2022–present	Nguyễn Thanh Sơn
