= Off the Record (charity) =

UK mental health charity

Off The Record
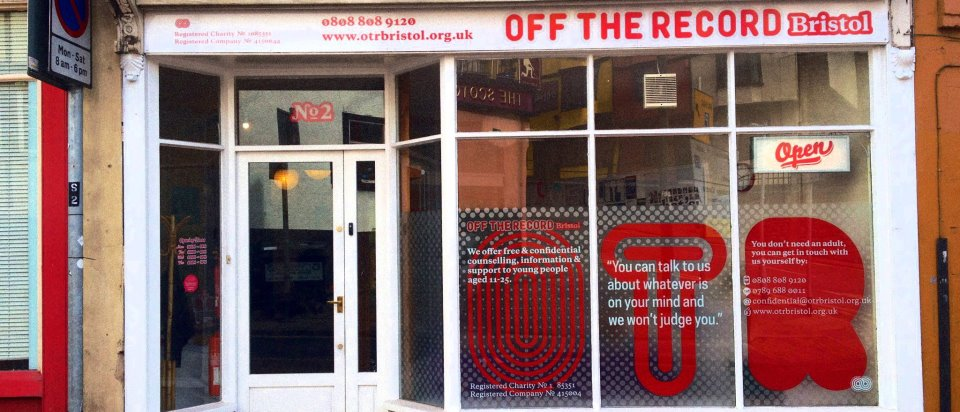
- Founded: 1965
- Type: Charity
- Purpose: Mental health, emotional wellbeing, youth rights
- Location: 8-10 West Street, Old Market, Bristol, BS2 0BH, UK
- Region served: West of England
- Services: Mental health services; charitable services
- Key people: Chief executive: Interim CEO as of Autumn 2023
- Employees: 70
- Volunteers: 60
- Website: otrbristol.org.uk

Off The Record (OTR) is a mental health support and information Bristol, Bath, North Somerset and North East Somerset, which provides counselling, group workshops, anti-stigma campaigns, creative therapies, LGBTQ+ networks and support, stress management workshops and community-based support groups for young people. OTR works across the West of England and is free at every point of access.

Founded in November 1965, Off The Record (Bristol) is one of the oldest established young people's mental health services in the country. The service began as a result of a combined initiative between the Bristol Association of Youth Clubs and Bristol Marriage and Family Guidance Council.

Off The Record receives funding from Comic Relief, Children in Need, Bristol City Council and the Big Lottery Fund.

== Mentality project ==
Mentality is a youth leadership project by Off the Record. Young people aged 13–19 with experience of mental health issues come together to campaign across Bristol for better mental health awareness. Mentality visit schools, colleges and other institutions across Bristol to host workshops and presentations on mental health.

In March 2014, Mentality celebrated three years of campaigning with an event at The Station, Bristol.

== Awards ==
In 2012, Off The Record's youth volunteer project 'Mentality' won a prestigious Philip Lawrence Award, a national award for youth groups, judged by a panel headed by Sir Trevor McDonald. Off The Record hosted a celebratory evening at Bristol Museum.

In 2013, the charity received a cash prize for winning the Miss Millies Good Neighbour Award in Bristol.

In May 2017, OTR was recognised at the Charity Governance Awards in the 'Managing Turnaround' category, due to the organisation's growth since 2009–10. OTR now supports over 3,000 young people in Bristol every year.
