= Petherton Resource Centre =

- Avon and Wiltshire Mental Health Partnership NHS Trust
- "Location in Bristol"

Geography
- Location: Hengrove, Bristol, United Kingdom
- Coordinates: 51.4208°N 2.5620°W

Organisation
- Care system: Public NHS
- Type: Specialist

Services
- Emergency department: No Accident & Emergency
- Speciality: Day hospital

History
- Founded: Early 2000s

Links
- Website: www.awp.nhs.uk
- Lists: Hospitals in the United Kingdom

Petherton Resource Centre is a centre for community mental health services in South Bristol, United Kingdom. It is managed by Avon and Wiltshire Mental Health Partnership NHS Trust.

== History ==
The resource centre was established in an existing building in South Bristol shortly after the formation of the trust in 2001. Following the demolition of the existing building of traditional construction, a modern two-storey extension was constructed on the site.

== Services ==
The centre is the base for the following teams:

- Crisis Service (Bristol South)
- Recovery Team (Bristol South)
- Bristol ADHD Service
- Bristol Autism Spectrum Service
- Specialist psychological service for anxiety and related problems
- Mental Health Criminal Justice Service

== See also ==
- Brookland Hall - Central Bristol services
- Healthcare in Bristol
