= High-dependency unit (mental health) =

Psychiatric treatment facility

A high-dependency unit (HDU) is an inpatient psychiatric ward, typically with only a small number of beds, attached to an acute admissions ward. It is intended to provide treatment for patients who cannot be managed safely on an acute (open) ward, but do not meet the threshold for admission to PICU. The number of staff per patient will be higher than the associated acute ward, but may be lower than levels at a PICU.

== Purpose ==
According to the guidelines for the operation of mental health high-dependency units in Queensland Mental Health Act 2000, HDU can be defined as "a separate potentially lockable area within a mental health inpatient facility, designed to provide for the safe management of involuntary patients requiring a higher level of individual care."

In most hospitals, a high-dependency unit is a separate unit within the psychiatric ward for inpatients who require special care for mental illnesses and usually has an increased staff-to-patient ratio. People in HDUs need more intensive treatment, observation, nursing care, increased level of supervision and intervention in a safe environment. Patient spending time in HDU varies depending on the nature of their illnesses and demands.

Reasons for placing a person in an HDU varies and may include any of the following such as if someone poses significant harm or threat to others/self, chances of absconding which will likely lead to a deterioration in the person's mental and/or physical condition.
