= Beaufort War Hospital =

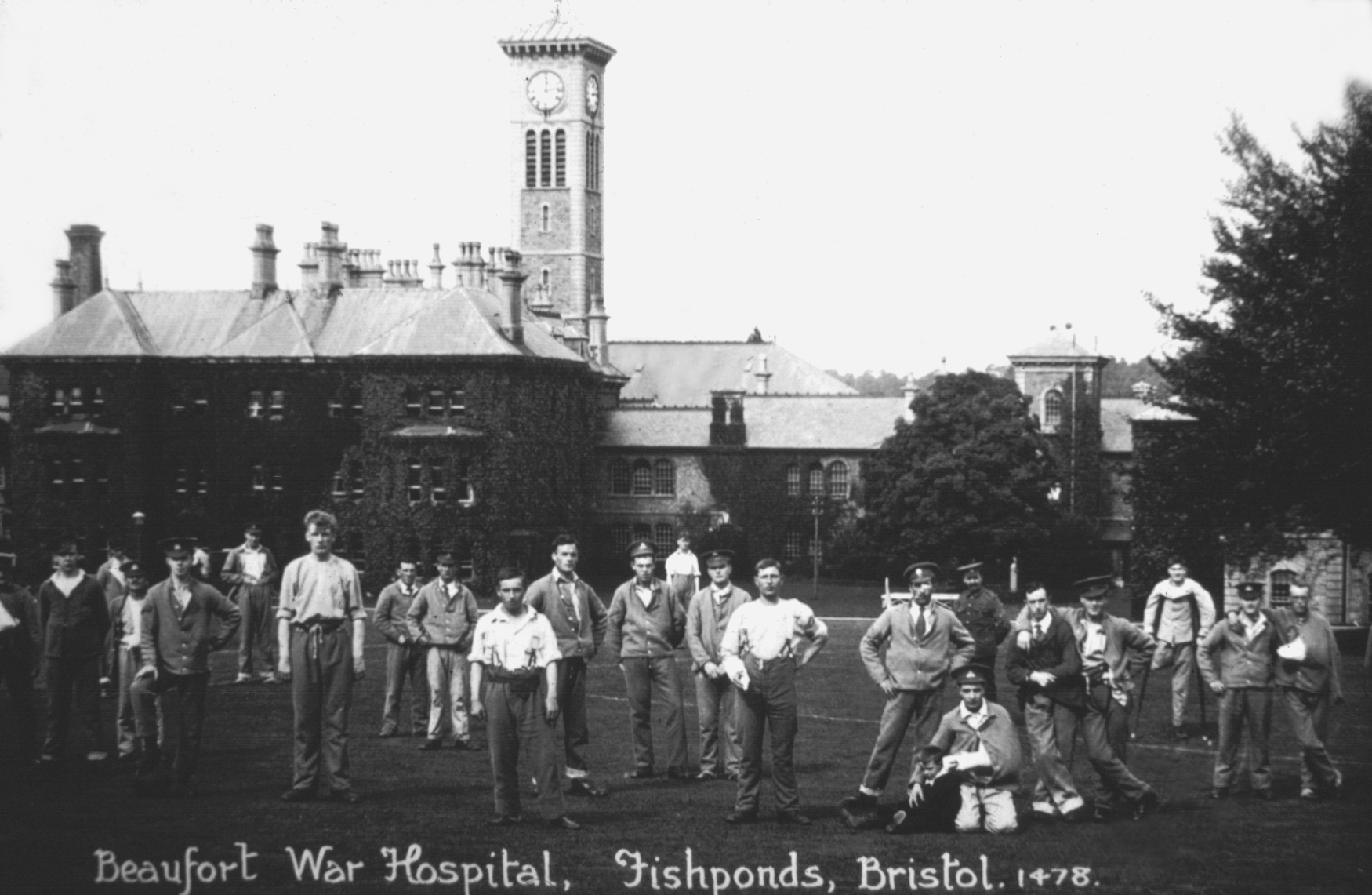
- Beaufort War Hospital, with patients on lawn

- Location within Bristol

Geography
- Location: Bristol, England
- Coordinates: 51°29′06″N 2°32′35″W

Organisation
- Care system: NHS
- Type: General

Services
- Emergency department: No

History
- Founded: 1845
- Closed: 1993

Links
- Lists: Hospitals in England

Beaufort War Hospital was a military hospital in Stapleton district, now Greater Fishponds, of Bristol during the First World War. Before the war, it was an asylum called the Bristol Lunatic Asylum, and after the war it became the psychiatric hospital called Glenside Hospital.

== History ==
Built next to the co-located Stapleton Hospital mental health facility, the Bristol Lunatic Asylum was the city’s response to the 1845 Mental Asylum Health Act, which laid upon local authorities the statutory duty to provide treatment facilities for in-patients. The building was by Henry Crisp, with subsequent additions by Crisp and George Oatley.

Originally designed for 250 in-patients it had to be extended numerous times during the next thirty years. In the 1850s all of the patients of Fishponds House, an older asylum at the intersection of Manor Road and Fishponds Road, were moved to the Bristol Lunatic Asylum. By the start of the 20th century it housed some 951 long-term patients (419 male, 532 women) though this number continued to swell up to the eve of World War I. An expanding population required more accommodation, and numerous wings and extensions were added in the same locally quarried hard grey sandstone that had the uncomforting appearance of granite. The same rough-hewn material had also been used for the construction of the orphanages that Stanley Spencer had passed with such trepidation in nearby Ashley Down.

Contemporary photographs of the wards show that they were self-contained units, with separate day and night rooms. Beyond the rather severe appearance of the building and its austere interiors, there are glimpses of the extensive grounds of the hospital, an estate that contained a pig-farm and allotments that provided most of the garden produce required by the asylum and, indeed, returned a good profit to the hospital economy. Between the ominous stone wings were a number of neatly planted interior courtyards whose orchard trees and tidy flower-beds were meticulously maintained by inmates of the asylum.

=== First World War ===
By the time the first wounded soldiers arrived in late 1914, the asylum had undergone a major conversion. Like many hospitals across the country it had been requisitioned by the War Office, which had demanded some 15,000 beds to be supplied nationally for war wounded. In his Annual Report for that year, Alderman George Pearson, chairman of the Asylum Committee of Visitors, recorded that the hospital had urgently been called into military use because the other Bristol hospitals could not cope with the increasing numbers of wounded being sent from the Western Front, and more recently from the Dardanelles. Pearson’s report also noted that it would now be known as 'Beaufort War Hospital, for the general medical and surgical treatment of sick and wounded soldiers', the name deriving from the patronage of the Duke of Beaufort who owned the land and extensive properties in the city of Bristol.

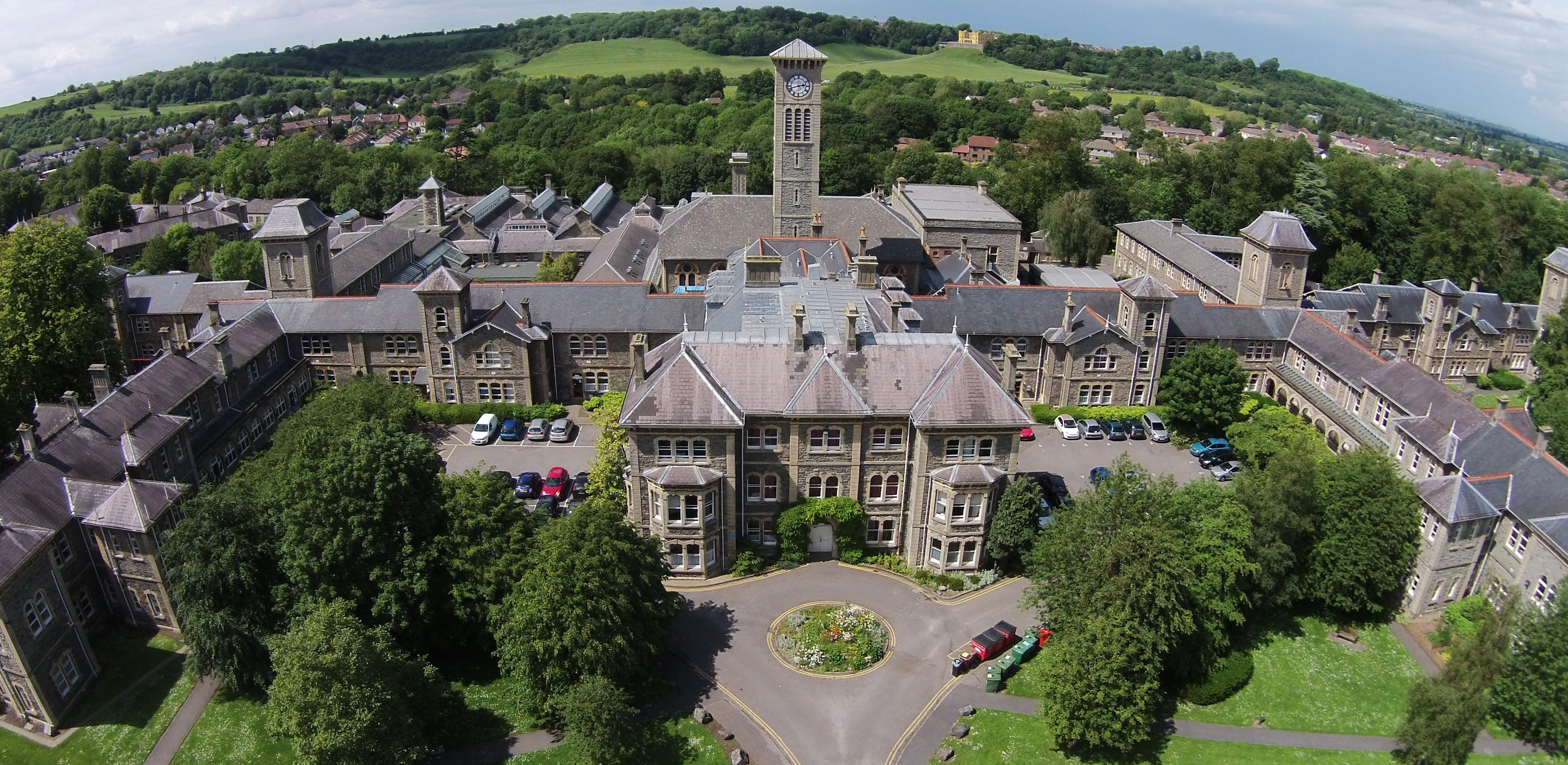
Aerial photograph of the main buildings

Apart from 45 patients who were retained to work the farm, the service departments and the kitchen garden, its patients were evacuated, often with very little notice, to rural asylums in the south-west, some as far afield as Cornwall and Dorset. At War Office expense, three frantic months were spent converting the asylum to house up to 1,460 wounded soldiers. Day rooms and night wards were converted into twenty-four medical and surgical wards. To cope with emergency admissions, corridors were refurbished to provide a further 180 bed spaces. Even the maximum restraint cells were requisitioned for temporary use. Throughout the asylum, rooms were crudely adapted to act as operating theatres, radiography departments and pharmacy stations. Contemporary photographs show, however, that the hospital retained some of its pre-war character, and the wards are strewn with large potted plants and ornate furnishings, though little could disguise the hard deal tables, the flagstone floors and the high windows with their cast-iron glazing bars. Stanley Spencer, the painter who served as a medical orderly in 1915–1916, can be glimpsed in one of these photographs – a diminutive, slightly dishevelled figure in an ill-fitting tunic, surrounded by long avenues of beds, each separated by large, ungainly wooden lockers.

Just as the building was modified for military use, so its personnel were given new roles. Most of the permanent staff found themselves now working for the armed service, 'volunteers' given suitable military rank. Asylum Superintendent (1904–1924) Dr R. J. Vincent Blachford, became Lieutenant- Colonel RAMC, his horse-drawn cab was replaced with a motor car and he occupied an official apartment in the administrative block. More medical personnel were appointed, some twenty-five physicians and surgeons arrived and a registrar, Dr Phillips, was appointed as deputy to the colonel. A group photograph of 1915, taken on the steps of the ivy-clad central block, captures nineteen officers, with the ranks of major and captain, all but one – Jarvis – sporting a rather fierce moustache. According to Stanley, the female staff was no less fierce. In parallel with their male co-workers the asylum wardresses became nursing assistants, but they were to be supervised by fresh intakes of trained nurses drawn from the Red Cross, who in turn were to be managed by experienced ward sisters from the Queen Alexandra’s Imperial Military Nursing Service Reserve. In charge of this contingent of some fifty female staff was the newly appointed hospital matron, Miss Gibson, who (unlike her male counterpart) supplanted the former asylum matron. Orderlies, two to each ward, were at the bottom of the hierarchy, and they worked under the authoritarian, and unchallenged, command of the ward sister.

Veterans of World War I had little affection for the military hospitals; many memoirists complained of an inhumanity that seemed to increase with distance from the battlefield. At the front, wounded soldiers were treated by fellow-combatants and by familiar regimental doctors. 'The wounded man' recalled one soldier, ‘ is in a moment a little baby and all the rest become the tenderest of mothers. One holds his hand; another lights his cigarette. Before this, it is given to few to know the love of those who go together through the long valley of the shadow of death.' (76) All this changed in the rear of the battle zone and in the general hospitals back in ‘Blighty’. Given the restrictions on wartime transport their journey from the front might be surprisingly rapid. Gilbert Spencer (Stanley Spencer's younger brother who also served as a medical orderly) recalled his first terrifying moments at Beaufort when he was surrounded by a 'ward full of wounded Gallipoli soldiers, their skins sunburnt and their clothes bleached and the soil of Suvla Bay still on their boots.'

Spencer's experiences of the hospital were later incorporated into his paintings for the Sandham Memorial Chapel at Burghclere, near Newbury, West Berkshire.

=== Post First World War ===
The hospital was later renamed Glenside Hospital. From January 1993, the co-located Manor Park and Glenside hospitals merged to become the jointly named Blackberry Hill Hospital. Patients of Glenside were assessed for capability, with many placed within the Care in the Community programme, while the residual were moved into new buildings constructed on the former Manor Park site for their long-term care.

The former Glenside Hospital campus was bought in 1996 when the Avon and Gloucestershire College of Health and Bath and Swindon College of Health Studies, joined with the existing University of the West of England's Faculty of Health and Community Studies.
