= Psychiatric intensive-care unit =

High intensity psychiatric ward

Psychiatric Intensive Care Units or PICUs are specialist twenty-four hour inpatient wards that provide intensive assessment and comprehensive treatment to individuals during the most acute phase of a serious mental illness.

Psychiatric intensive care is for patients who are in an acutely disturbed phase of a serious mental disorder. There is an associated loss of capacity for self-control with a corresponding increase in risk which does not allow their safe, therapeutic management and treatment in a less acute or a less secure mental health ward. Care and treatment must be patient-centred, multidisciplinary, intensive and have an immediacy of response to critical clinical and risk situations. Patients should be detained compulsorily under the appropriate mental health legislative framework, and the clinical and risk profile of the patient usually requires an associated level of security. Psychiatric intensive care is delivered by qualified and suitably trained multidisciplinary clinicians according to an agreed philosophy of unit operational policy underpinned by the principles of therapeutic intervention and dynamic clinically focused risk management

— NAPICU and NHS Clinical Commissioners, Guidance for Commissioners of Psychiatric Intensive Care Units (PICU) (2016)

Most individuals only stay on PICU wards for a very short time and are moved as soon as the crisis is over or the risky behaviours are under control. 2014 guidance says that the maximum length of stay should be 8 weeks. Normally, patients are discharged to acute psychiatric wards, but some patients go straight home.

PICUs are locked and more secure wards, and have a low patient capacity when compared to open psychiatric wards. They have higher levels of staffing and are usually single-sex.

PICUs have a diverse range of staff, including: mental health nurses, psychiatrists, psychologists, pharmacists, occupational therapists, social workers, activities co-ordinators, health care support workers, and ward managers.

As a facility for the most disturbed patients, it may contain a seclusion room for the management of violence and aggression. Other restrictive practices include rapid tranquillisation, ECT and high dose antipsychotics.
