= Glenside, Bristol =

University campus in Bristol, England

Glenside
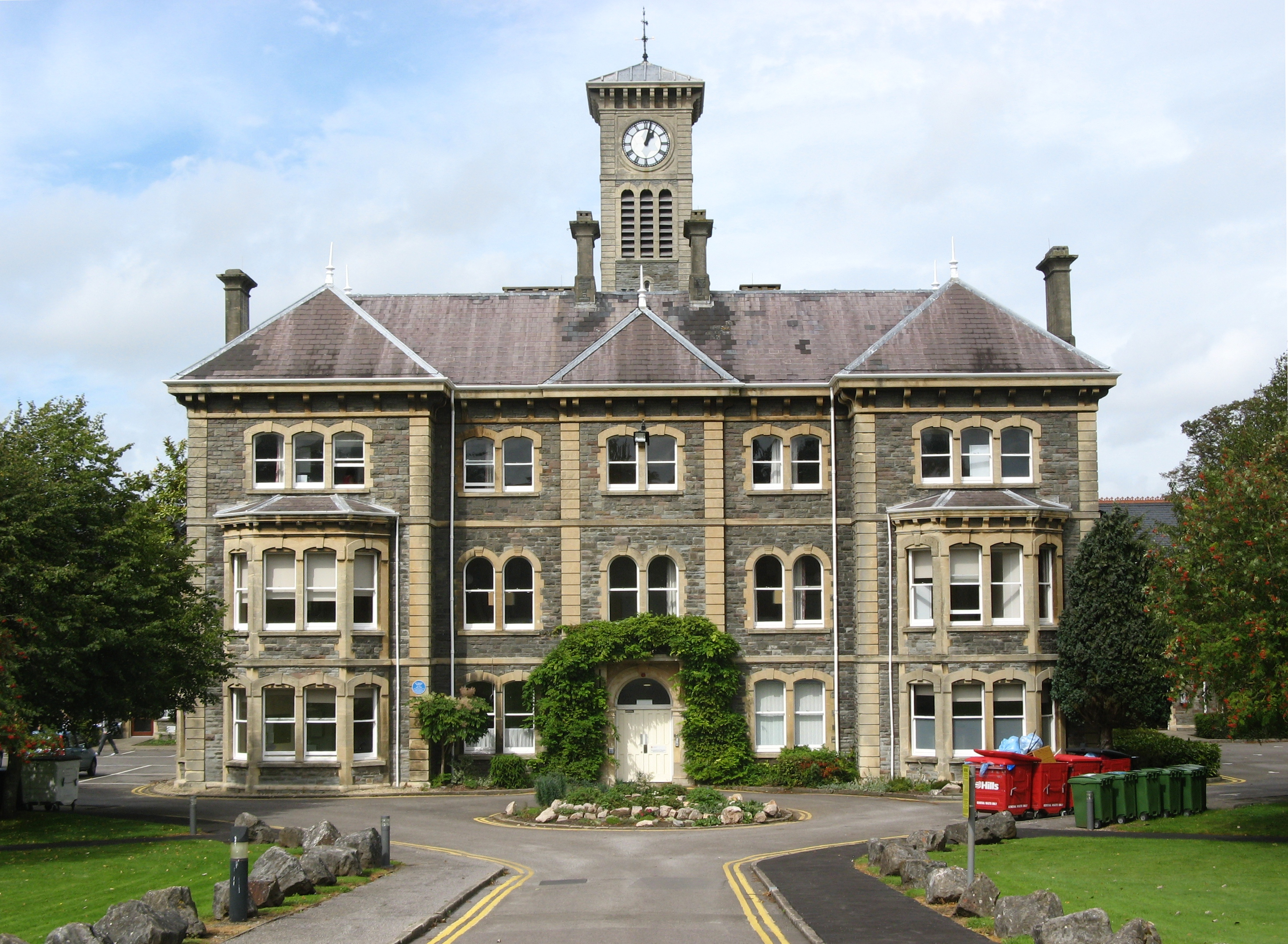
- Part of the Glenside Hospital building (now Faculty of Health and Social Care, UWE)

- Location within Bristol

General information
- Location: Bristol, England
- Coordinates: 51.484853°N 2.540725°W
- Completed: 1861

Design and construction
- Architect: Henry Crisp

Glenside campus is the home of the Faculty of Health and Applied Sciences at the University of the West of England (UWE Bristol), in Bristol. It is located on Blackberry Hill in the suburb of Fishponds. Its clocktower is a prominent landmark, visible from the M32 motorway. Several of the buildings on the site are Grade II listed.

== History ==
=== Bristol Lunatic Asylum ===
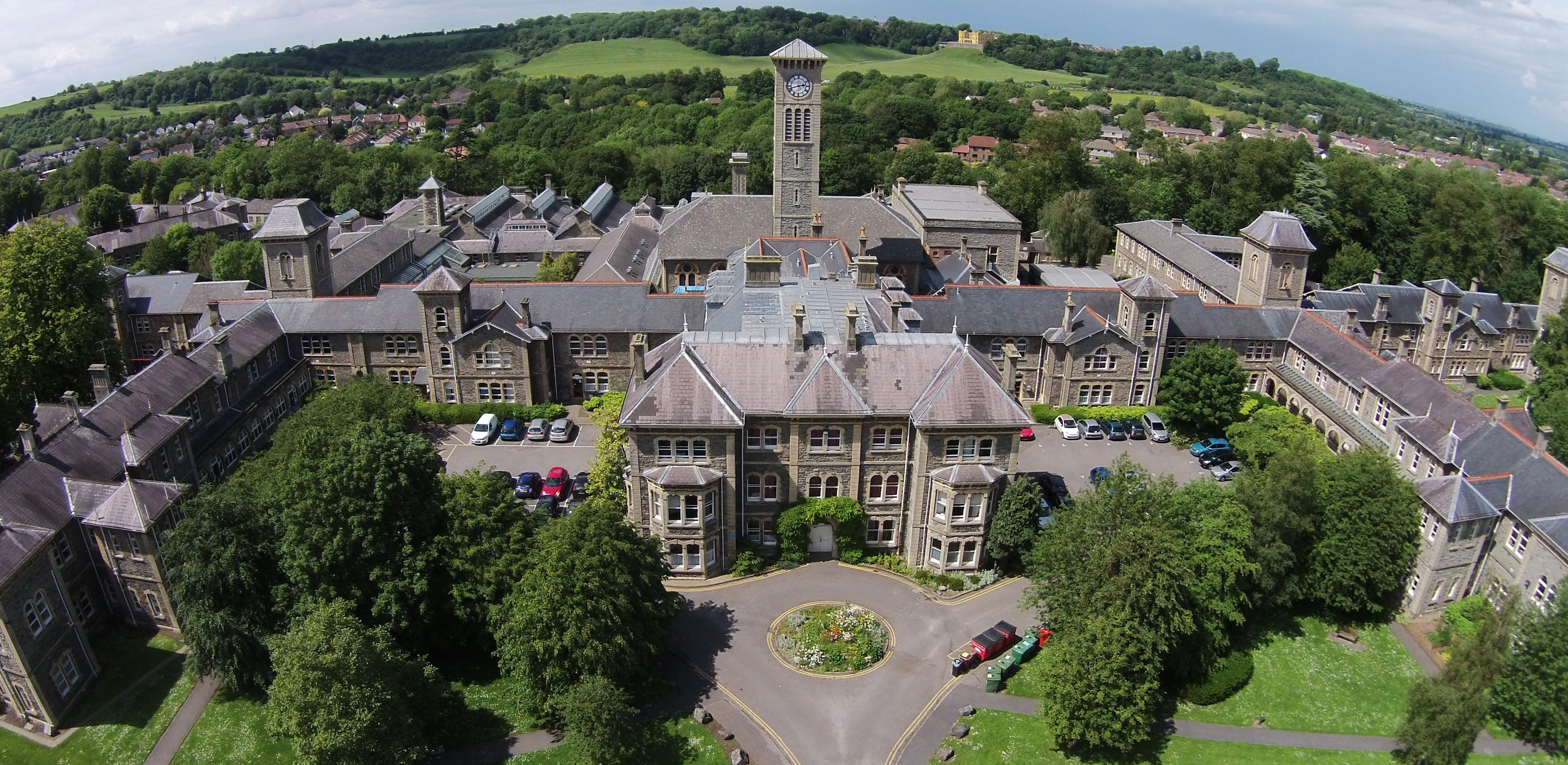
Aerial photograph of Glenside, Bristol

By 1844, St Peter's Hospital for Pauper Lunatics, in what is now Castle Park, was overcrowded and not fit-for-purpose. Bristol Corporation therefore ordered a new hospital to be built outside of the city in Stapleton. Opened in 1861, Bristol Lunatic Asylum was designed by Henry Crisp and built next to the co-located Stapleton Work House (now Blackberry Hill Hospital). In the 1890s, photography of the patients was introduced as it was thought at the time to help with diagnoses. Recent research has revealed a recovery rate of around 46%.

=== Beaufort War Hospital ===
In 1914, the hospital was requisitioned by the War Office, renamed Beaufort War Hospital and 931 patients were transferred to other asylums in the West of England, with 45 patients remaining to work in the hospital grounds. The artist Stanley Spencer worked as a medical orderly at the Beaufort from 1915 to 1916.

=== Glenside Hospital ===
In 1919, following the cessation of hostilities, the hospital returned to its former mental health function. Some time before the Second World War it was named Glenside Mental Hospital, and with the NHS reforms – the Mental Health Act 1959 – it was renamed Glenside Hospital. In 1961, there were 1,012 patients.

=== Blackberry Hill Hospital ===
In January 1993, Glenside and neighbouring Manor Park Hospital merged to become the jointly named Blackberry Hill Hospital. Patients of Glenside were assessed for capability, with many placed within the Care in the Community programme, while the residual were moved into new buildings constructed on the former Manor Park site for their long term care.

=== Avon and Gloucestershire College of Health ===
From 1992, the hospital began closing wards, and the site was converted into the Avon and Gloucestershire College of Health in a phased programme over three years.

=== UWE Glenside Campus ===
In 1996, the Avon and Gloucestershire College of Health and Bath and the Swindon College of Health Studies joined with the University of the West of England to purchase the former Glenside site, and converted it into the UWE Faculty of Health and Social Care, currently the faculty of Health and Applied Sciences.

== Museum ==
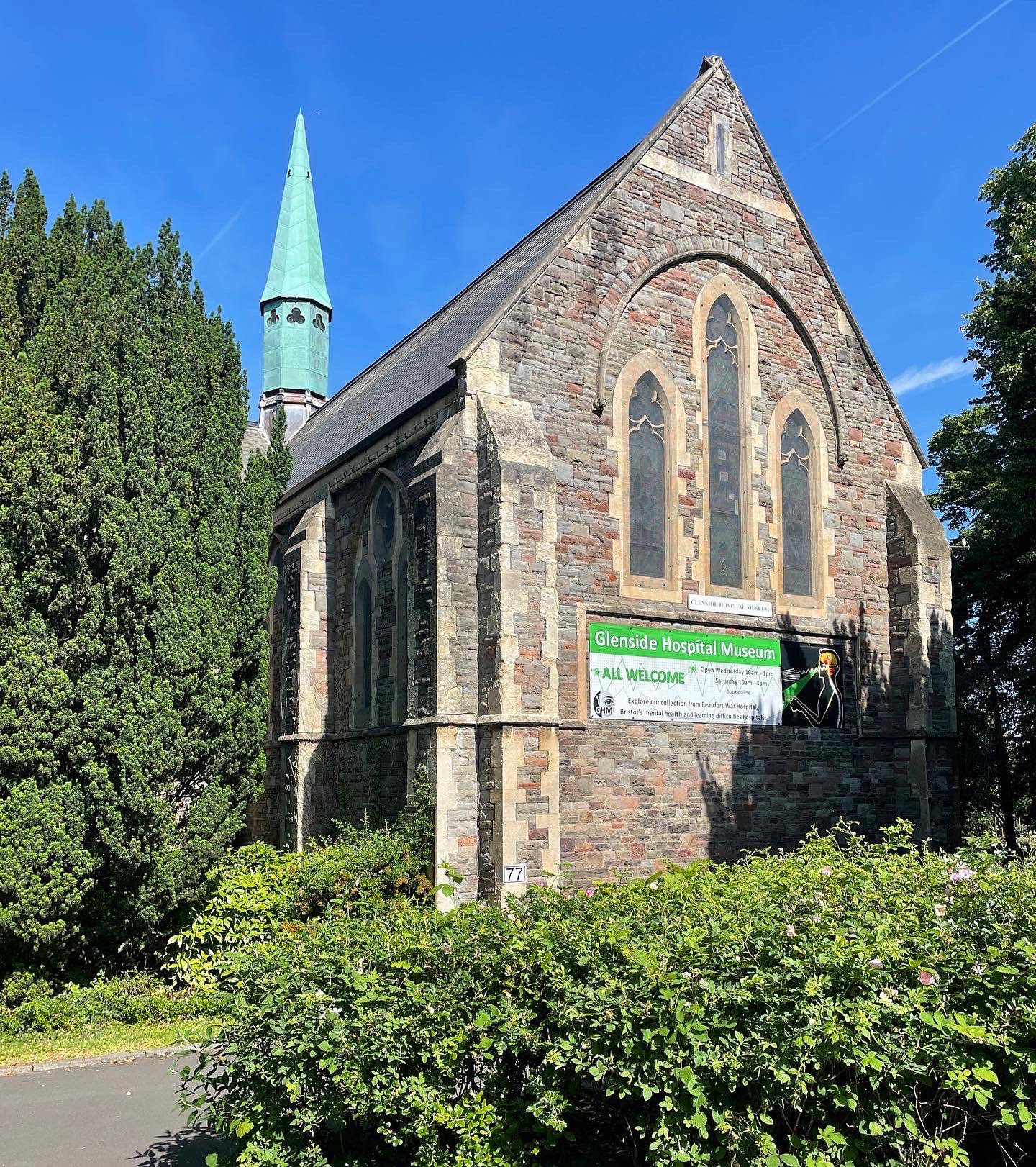
Glenside Hospital Museum exterior

The museum, founded by Dr Donal F. Early, used to be situated in the balcony of the canteen, but has since re-located to the Grade II listed former asylum chapel. The museum's collection consists of a wide range of paraphernalia and images from the life of Glenside Hospital and of the local Learning Disability Hospitals of the Stoke Park Group and the Burden Neurological Institution.

== Archives ==
Records of Glenside Hospital and the original Bristol Lunatic Asylum are held at Bristol Archives (Ref. 40513).

== Departments ==
The Faculty of Health and Applied Sciences includes the following departments:

- Department of Nursing and Midwifery
- Department of Biological, Biomedical and Analytical Sciences
- Department of Allied Health Professions
- Department of Health and Social Sciences

== Courses ==
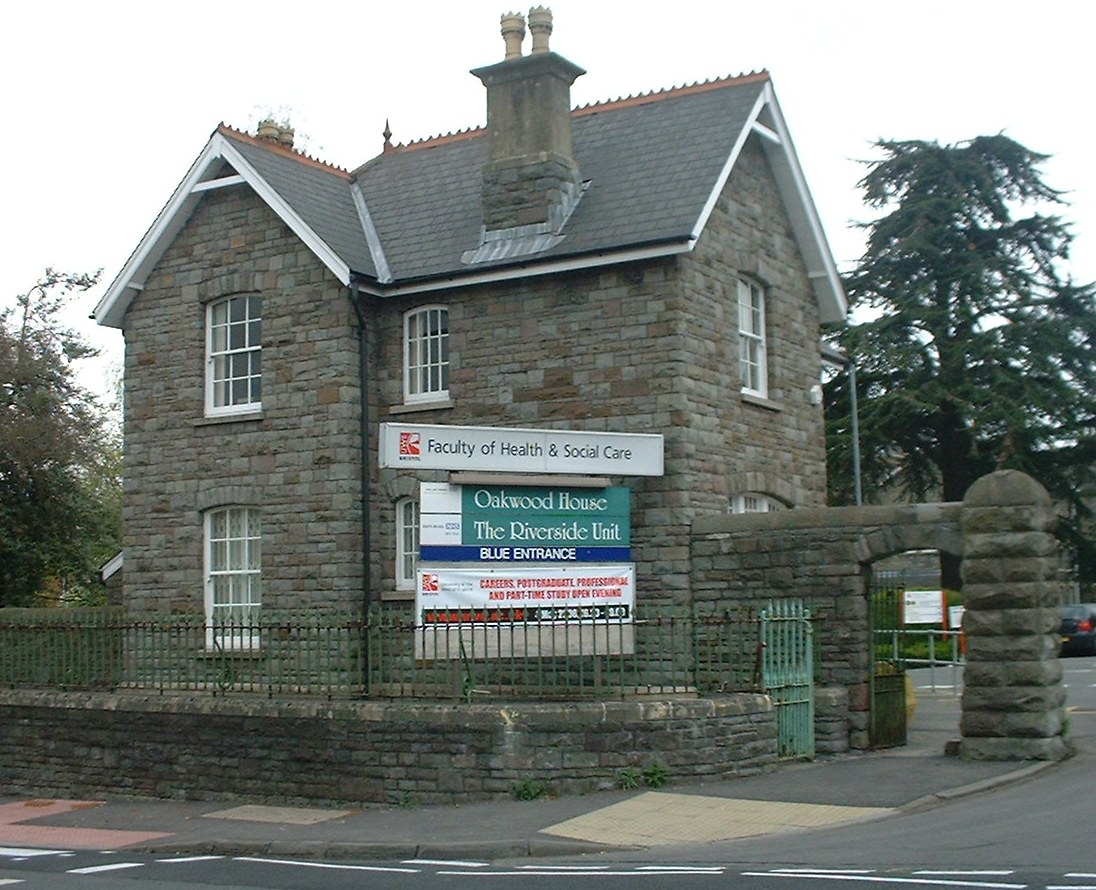
The Lodge at Glenside

The faculty offers full and part-time courses at all levels, from BSc and Diploma courses to MSc and PhD, plus a wide range of continuing education, in the areas of Midwifery, Nursing, Occupational Therapy, Optometry, Physiotherapy, Radiography, Social Work, and other health-related professions.

== See also ==
- History of psychiatric institutions
