= Wills (surname) =

Wills is a surname. Notable people with the surname include:

- Alec Wills (1911–1941), English cricketer and Royal Air Force officer
- Alfred Wills (1828–1912), English High Court judge and mountaineer
- Andrew Wills (born 1972), Australian football player
- Anneke Wills (born 1941), British actress
- Arthur Wills (musician) (1926–2020), English musician, composer and professor
- Arthur Walters Wills (1868–1948), English politician, MP for North Dorset
- Bob Wills (1905–1975), American Western swing musician
- Bump Wills (born 1952), American baseball player
- Childe Wills (1878–1940), early associate of Henry Ford, and contributor to the design of the Model T
- Chill Wills (1902–1978), American actor and singer
- Christopher Wills (born 1938), American biologist
- David Wills (disambiguation)
- Edwina Florence Wills (1915–2002), American composer and sculptor
- Ernest C. Wills (1892–1976), American college baseball coach
- Frank Wills (architect) (1822–1857), British architect
- Frank Wills (baseball) (1958–2012), American baseball player
- Frank Wills (security guard) (1948–2000), security guard that discovered the break-in that led to the Watergate scandal
- Frederick Wills (disambiguation)
- Garry Wills (born 1934), American author and historian
- George Alfred Wills (1854–1928), President of Imperial Tobacco
- Harry Wills (1889–1958), American boxer
- Helen Wills Moody (1905–1998), American tennis player
- Henry Wills (disambiguation)
- Horatio Wills (1811–1861), Australian pastoralist and politician, father of Tom
- James Wills (disambiguation)
- Jedrick Wills (born 1999), American football player
- John Wills (disambiguation)
- Jonathan Wills (journalist), British journalist
- Jonathan W. G. Wills (born 1947), Scottish journalist
- Josh Wills, member of the American band Story of the Year
- Sir Kenneth Agnew Wills (1896–1977), Australian academic administrator and 8th Chancellor of the University of Adelaide
- Kevin Wills (born 1980), English footballer
- Lucy Wills (1888–1964), English haematologist
- Marcus Wills (born 1972), Australian artist
- Mark Wills (born 1973), American country music artist
- Mary Wills (disambiguation)
- Maury Wills (1932–2022), American baseball player
- Michael Wills (born 1952), English politician
- Mills Wills (fl. 1777–1796), American politician
- Nat M. Wills (1873–1917), American vaudeville entertainer and recording artist
- Richard Wills (politician) (born 1945), American politician
- Richard J. Wills Jr (born 1942), bishop of the United Methodist Church
- Rick Wills (born 1947), British rock musician
- Robert Wills (disambiguation)
- Royal Barry Wills (1895–1962), American architect
- Ruth Wills (1826–1908), English poet
- Salli Wills, Australian gymnast
- Simon Wills (racing driver) (born 1976), New Zealand racing driver
- Sue Wills (1944–2022), Australian academic and activist
- Ted Wills (born 1934), American baseball player
- Tom Wills (1835–1880), Australian sportsman
- Thomas Wills (disambiguation)
- William Wills (disambiguation)
- Wills (baseball), American baseball player

== See also ==
- Wills (disambiguation)
- Wiles (disambiguation)
- Wilis (disambiguation)
- Willes (surname)
- Willis (disambiguation)
