= Willes =

Willes is a surname. Notable people with the surname include:

- Christiana Willes (1786-1873), English cricketer, sister of John
- Christine Willes, Canadian television, theatre and film actress
- Edmund Willes (1832–1896), English cricketer
- Edward Willes (priest) (1693–1773), Anglican Bishop of St David's, Bishop of Bath and Wells, prominent cryptanalyst
- Edward Willes (1702–1768), English-born judge who became Chief Baron of the Irish Exchequer
- Edward Willes (1723–1787), MP for Old Sarum, Aylesbury and Leominster, Solicitor-General 1766, judge of the Court of King's Bench
- George Willes (1823–1901), Royal Navy officer
- George Willes (cricketer) (1844–1901), English clergyman and cricketer
- George Atkinson-Willes (1847–1921), Royal Navy officer
- Jabez Willes (1790–1842), New York politician
- James Shaw Willes (1814–1872), English judge
- Jean Willes (1923–1989), American film actress
- John Willes (disambiguation), several people
- John Willes (cricketer) (1778–1852), English cricketer
- John Willes (judge) (1685–1761), English lawyer and judge
- John Willes (1721–1784), MP for Banbury 1746–1754
- Mark H. Willes (born 1941), Mormon businessman
- William S. S. Willes (1819–1871), Mormon pioneer

== See also ==
- Bertram Willes Dayrell Brooke (1876–1965)
- Willes Little Flower School, a college in Bangladesh
- Willis (disambiguation)
- Wills (disambiguation)
- Wiles (disambiguation)
