= Edward Willes =

Edward Willes may refer to:

- Edward Willes (bishop) (1693–1773), Anglican Bishop of St David's, Bishop of Bath and Wells, prominent cryptanalyst
- Sir Edward Willes (1702–1768), English-born judge who became Chief Baron of the Irish Exchequer
- Sir Edward Willes (1723–1787), MP for Old Sarum, Aylesbury and Leominster, Solicitor-General 1766, judge of the Court of King's Bench

== See also ==
- Willes (surname)
