= Manor Hall, Bristol =

Student halls at the University of Bristol

Manor Hall
- University of Bristol
- Location: Clifton, Bristol, England
- Coordinates: 51.4545°N 2.6120°W
- Motto: Estote ergo prudentes sicut serpentes et simplices sicut columbae (Latin)
- Motto in English: Be ye as wise as serpents and as innocent as doves
- Established: 1932
- Architect: Sir George Oatley
- Status: Student hall of residence
- Warden: Dr Martin John Crossley Evans, MBE, JP, FSA, FGS.
- Residents: 350
- Website: www.bris.ac.uk/Depts/Manor

Map
- Location within Bristol

Manor Hall is a student hall of residence at the University of Bristol. Situated in the Georgian/Victorian suburb of Clifton, Bristol, it provides self-catering accommodation for around 340 residents, both in the main hall itself and also in a number of nearby surrounding annexes. The majority of residents are first year undergraduate students, but a number of 'returners' choose to stay on to contribute to the hall's life and community in subsequent years of study.

The hall has a number of student run organisations associated with it, the largest of which is the Junior Common Room which all current undergraduates residents are members of, with an elected committee of representatives being responsible for organising social events throughout the year. In addition to the Junior Common Room residents are supported pastorally by a team of Senior Residents who, along with a number of honorary members, make up the Senior Common Room.

After leaving the hall many of its former residents remain in touch via its alumni network: the Manor Hall Association, which organises a number of events throughout the year aimed at both current and former residents.

== The Main Hall ==
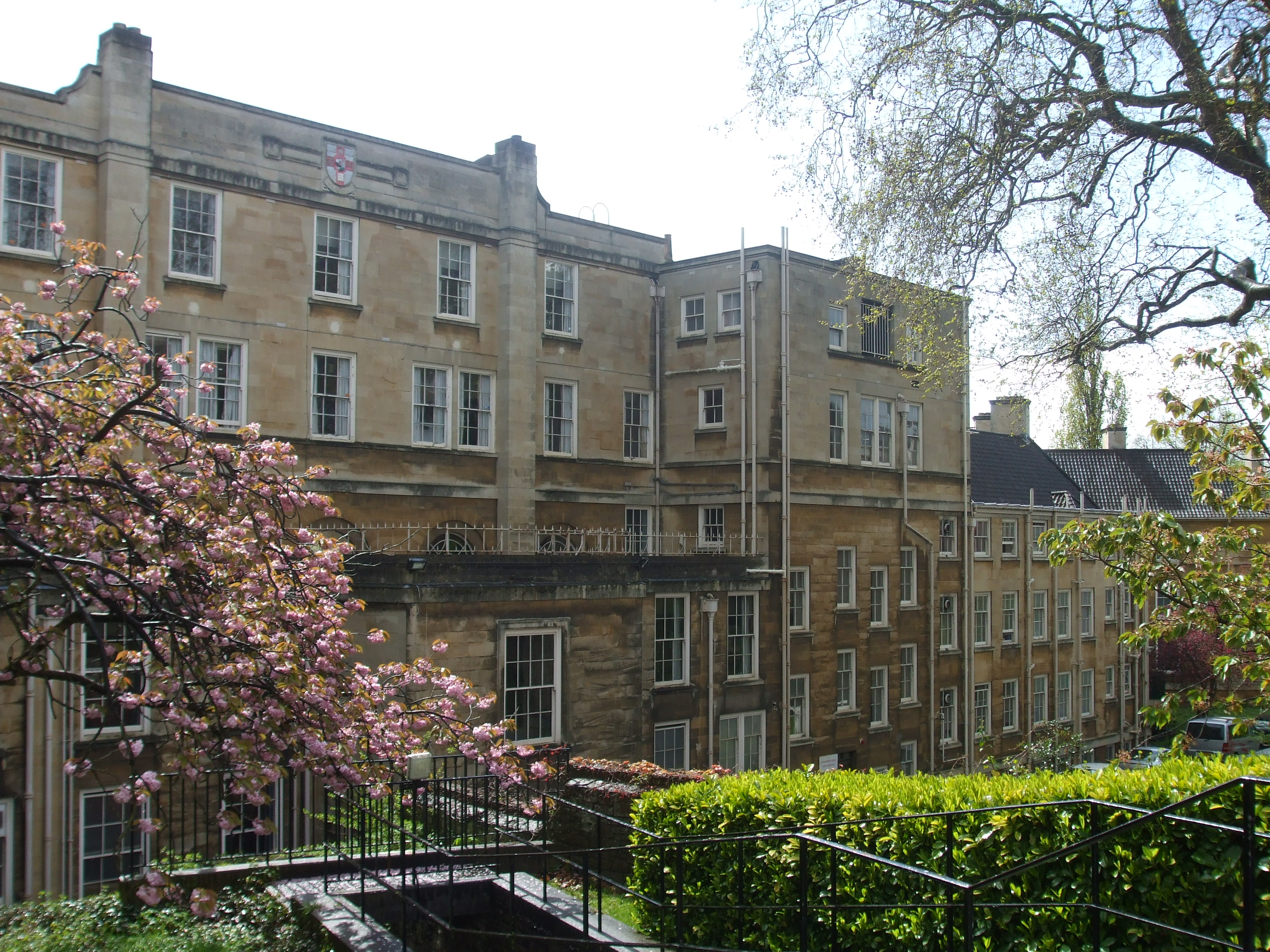
Entrance to Manor Hall viewed from Tottenham Place

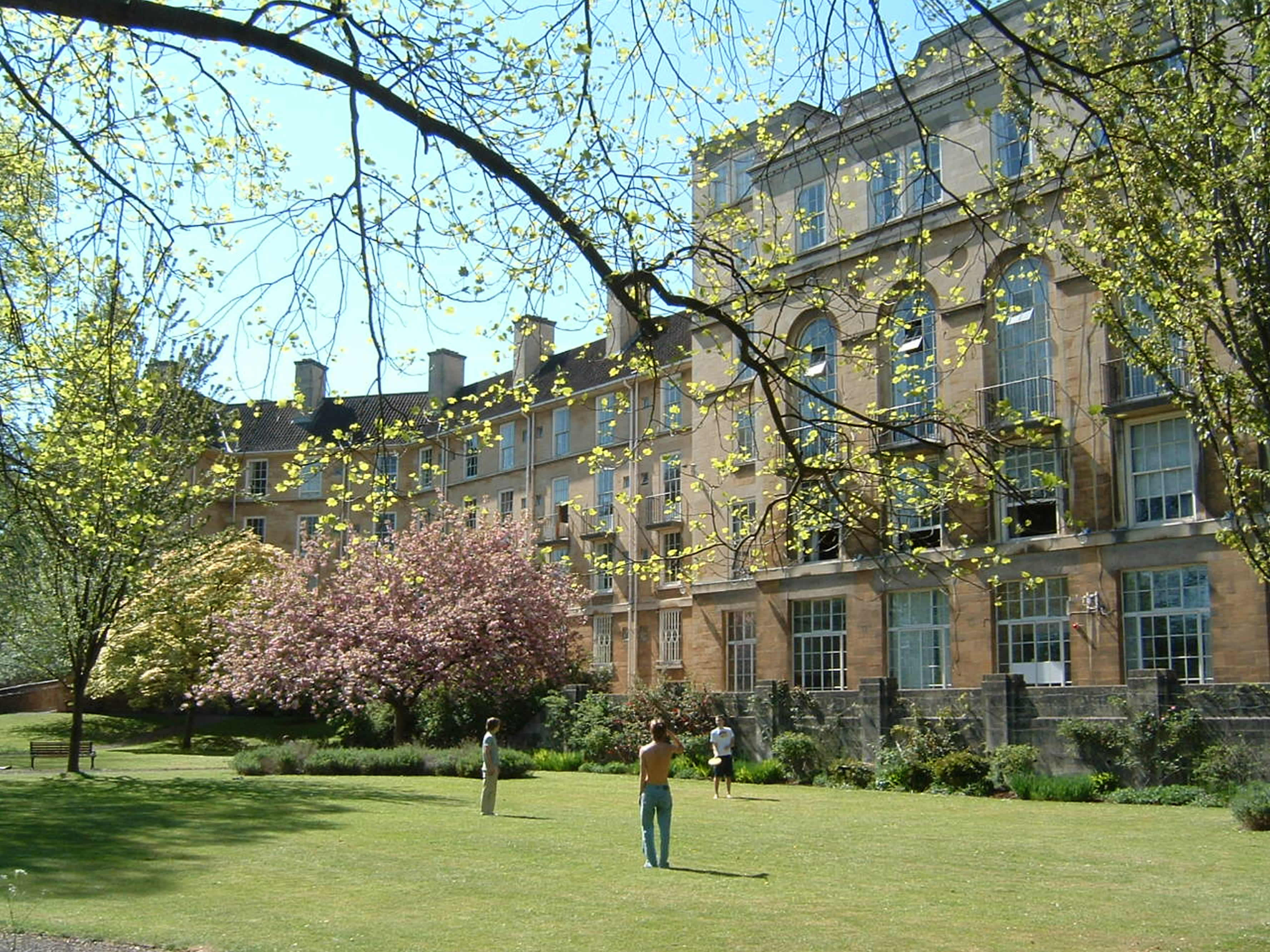
A view of the front of Manor Hall taken from within its gardens

The main hall was erected between 1927 and 1932 as a women's hall of residence in the grounds of its present annex Manor House, from which the Hall takes its name.

The hall owes its existence to the late Henry Herbert Wills and was designed by the leading neo-classical architect Sir George Oatley, who also designed the Wills Memorial Building and Wills Hall; both of which also belong to the University.

When the hall opened in 1932 a number of smaller residences for women: Belgrave House, Elton House, Heathside and Royal Park, were closed and their residents moved to the new building. The first warden, Mrs Jessie D. Skemp was the former Warden of Belgrave House and the widow of the Professor of English who was killed during the Great War.

The gardens were laid out by Hiatt Cowells Baker in 1934 and are occasionally opened to the public. The building is symmetrical, consisting of East and West facing sides, with a single corridor of student rooms occupying each floor. It houses around 140 students and includes a library, computer room, bar, common room, music room and laundry facilities. the Stops Gallery, outside the Great Hall, contains a number of works by local artists including Warren Storey RWA and H.John Stops, RWA.

In July 2012 the hall was closed for the most significant refurbishment in its history including upgrades to the heating system, kitchens, bathrooms, bedrooms and communal areas. It reopened in September 2013 with the official celebrations being held on 7 June 2014.

== Annexes ==
In addition to the main hall, Manor Hall comprises a number of smaller annexes located within its grounds and on nearby streets. These buildings, as with the main hall, have a rich history; with the oldest dating back as far as 18th century.

=== Manor House ===
This annex came to the University in 1919, again as a gift from the Wills family and was furnished partly from funds raised by concerts given by the famous Bristol contralto Dame Clara Butt.

The building was erected close to the site of the medieval manor house burned by Prince Rupert’s men in 1643 during the Storming of Bristol. Purchased by the Society of Merchant Venturers in the late 17th century the site remained ruinous for many years. On 17 September 1700 the Society mandated that "a lease for five lives was granted to Whitchurch Phippen of the site or ruins of the Great House at Clifton heretofore burnt down and since called the Old Castle, late in the holding of Mary Hodges". The new manor house was built in the early 18th century and extensively altered and extended in the mid-18th and 19th centuries. The terrace contains Roman remains, parts of a column, which are believed to have been brought back from the Mediterranean by a former resident in the eighteenth century.

In the 19th century it was successively the home of the notable scientists Dr William Budd FRS, who discovered the origins of typhoid, and Professor John Beddoe FRS, the social anthropologist who wrote The Races of Man. In the 1890s the house became a school preparing young gentlemen for colonial civil service examinations and for the army and navy. The school closed in 1915 and the house became the home of The Red Maids' School, which was evacuated from Westbury while their buildings were used as a Red Cross Hospital during the Great War.

=== Richmond House ===
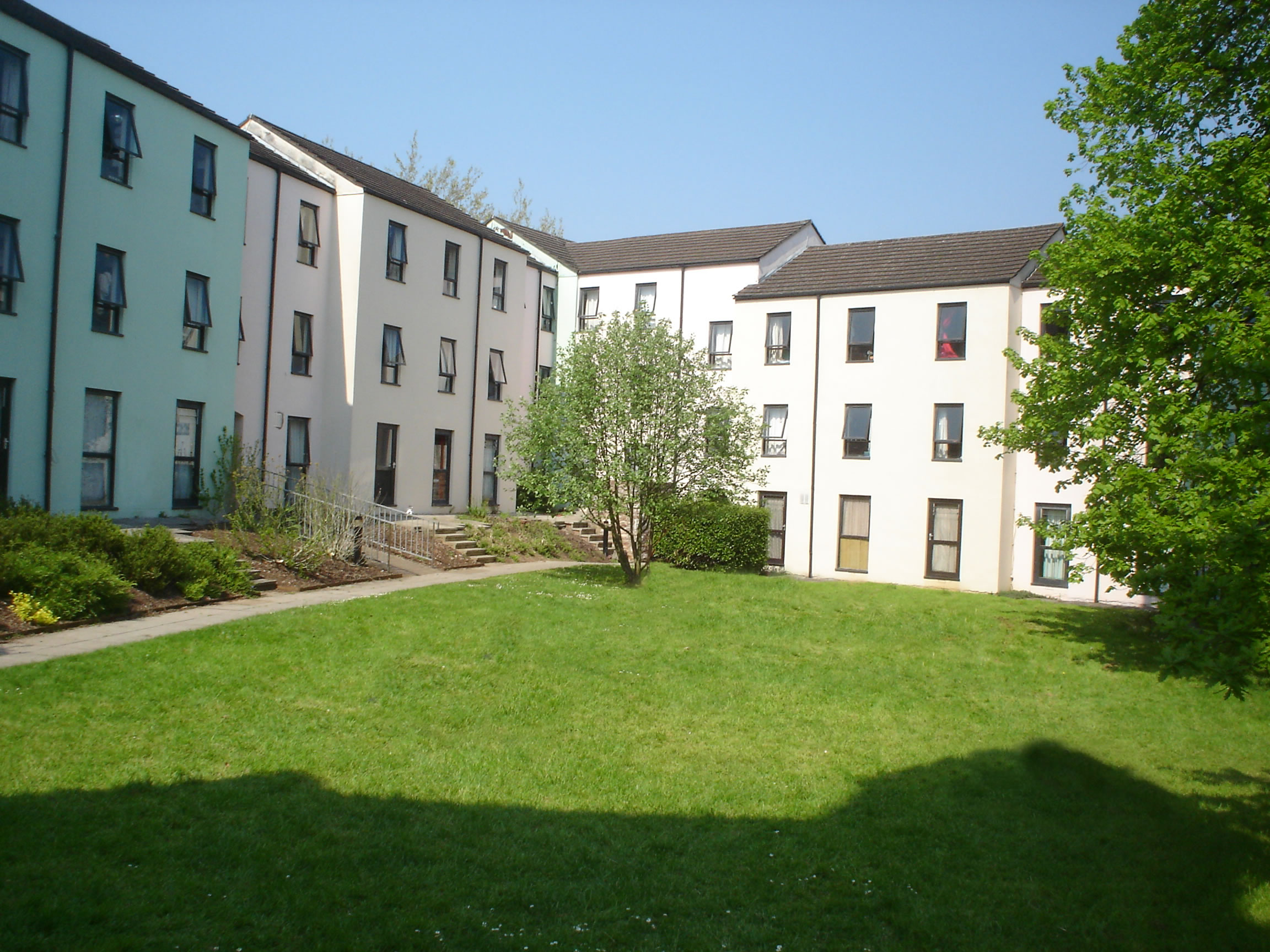
Sinclair House

Richmond House is one of the oldest houses in Clifton having been built between 1701-1703 For Whitchurch Phippen a Mercer of Bristol on the site of the medieval manor house burned during the Civil War, which had once been the home of Richard Amerike. The building is an English Heritage Grade II listed building. Amerike sponsored the explorer John Cabot, who sailed from Bristol in 1497 and discovered Newfoundland and is now believed by some scholars to have given his patronymic to name the continent of America.

In the 1790s the house was used as a boarding school for young gentlemen run by a Mr William Sewell. From the 1860s until the 1940s the house was the home of the Revd. and Mrs. Thomas Smith and their large family of daughters, one of whom, Emily Harriet Smith, became one of the first women to sit on the city council in 1920 and one of the first female Justice of the Peace. A noted horsewoman, the site of her former stables is now occupied, in part, by Sinclair House.

=== Sinclair House ===
Sinclair House was built partly on the site of Holland Cottage which were destroyed during the German air raids of November 1940. Opened in 1978, the building is named after the Lady Sinclair of Cleeve, who was involved in the affairs of the University for many years and served on the hall advisory committee of Manor Hall until her death. The building consists of twelve flats, each housing five students, and ten ground floor flats for overseas postgraduate students and their families.

The British Council contributed to the project on the understanding that preference would be given to students from the Commonwealth, or to those on British Council Scholarships.

=== Richmond Terrace ===
Richmond Terrace was originally a row of spacious townhouses constructed in the 1780s as part of the building boom of Clifton in between wars with France. 30-35 Richmond Terrace was a hotel prior before being acquired by the University in 2006. The building underwent a major refurbishment and it now provides self-catered en suite accommodation for 92 students. It was previously managed by University Student Houses and became a Manor Hall annexe in 2012.

=== 115 Queen's Road ===
115 Queen's Road is Manor Hall's newest annex, having been one of Clifton Hill House's annexes up until 2017. It houses 42 first years and two Senior Residents.

== Warden ==
The position of Warden was abolished in 2018 when the University changed the structure of its residencies. Formerly the Warden was the figurehead of the Hall and would be aided in their role by the Junior and Senior Common Rooms and had overall responsibility for the pastoral care of the Hall's residents.

=== Former Wardens ===
- 1932-1945: Mrs. Jessie D. Skemp (1882-1961)
- 1946-1956: Miss Gladys M. Morgan (1894-1957)
- 1956-1968: Mrs. Marjorie Tait (1908-1972)
- 1968-1974: Miss Audrey N. M. Rich
- 1974-1984: Miss Sheila B. Brennan (1922-2006)
- 1984-2018: Dr. Martin J. Crossley Evans MBE

== Student life ==
All current undergraduate residents are members of the hall's Junior Common Room with a Junior Common Room Committee being elected annually at the beginning of the Summer Term from amongst the residents and is responsible for organising many of the social and recreational activities in the hall, including the Freshers’ Welcome at the start of the academic year, sporting activities, hall 'formals' (dinner followed by various entertainments), and the annual garden party.

In addition to the Junior Common Room the hall has several student societies established exclusively for its residents including a Music and Drama Society, Debating Society, Club Bar, Christian Union and Charity Committee, the latter being involve in year round fundraising activities for a number of charities to which the hall has a close association.

Annual traditions at Manor Hall includes the running of two musical/dramatic productions a year, three formal dinners, and a garden party to celebrate the end of the academic year in addition to other events that are run throughout the year.

=== Music and Drama Society ===
The Manor Hall Amateur Dramatics Society, known as 'MAD', was formed in October 1933. Its first production was a nativity play, The Child in Flanders, by Cicely Hamilton, which was performed on 8 December 1933. Recent productions include Mostellaria, And Then There Were None, Road, The Crucible and The Secret Diary of Adrian Mole.

== Manor Hall Association ==
Students who have lived in the hall for one academic term are entitled to join the Manor Hall Association, which acts at the hall's alumni network, to help former residents keep in contact with one another and the hall community. The Association is responsible for the organisation of the annual Summer Ball, usually held to celebrate the achievements of that years graduands, in 2014 the Summer Ball also served as the official celebrations for the hall's 80th anniversary, two years after the fact due to the refurbishment works taking place in the main building during the 2012/13 session of the University.

The Association itself has a long history, and in fact predates Manor Hall being originally formed in 1925 as the ‘Elton House Old Students’ Association’ by Winifred Armstead. In 1932, when the ladies from Elton House relocated to the newly built Manor Hall, the Association was renamed accordingly. The Association is run by a committee of volunteers and was wound up pro tem in 2005 due to incumbent committee growing too old to continue its work with members being transferred to the Wills Hall Association until such a time as new officers could be found to continue its work.

In 2007, the decision was taken that its work should continue and that alumni of the Hall should have an effective mechanism to keep in touch with the Manor Hall and each other. As such the Association was brought out of abeyance in December 2007 with Christopher Didcote acting as its first Chairman.

=== Elton House Award ===
Each year the Association presents up to two of its members with the Elton House Award for outstanding contribution to the Manor Hall Community. The award itself was established in 2008 to not only mark the recent reformation of the Association but as a way of recognising the often considerable time and effort select individuals invest into the life of the hall. The name is taken from Elton House, one of the student hostels that Manor Hall was built to replace in 1932 and from where the predecessor of the Manor Hall Association took its name.

Winners of the award receive three years' honorary membership of the Association, a certificate and an Elton House Award pin. The presentation usually takes place during the Association's Summer Ball.

=== The MHA Fund ===
In 2012, the Association would set up a charitable fund for the use of Manor Hall and its residents. The aim of this fund being to provide financial support to either the Hall or any of its student run committees. The fund is operated on an application basis with the Association reviewing legitimate applications for finance from those currently involved in the life of the Hall for the acquisition of assets that will provide some tangible benefit to the Hall and future generations of students who reside there. Fundraising activities are conducted throughout the year, usually in the form of prize raffles at hall events.

== Crest, motto and tie ==
The hall crest is divided into two halves. The upper half is described heraldically as "gules, a sun in splendour" or a golden sun. The late Sir John Wills, Bart. of Langford Court, Somerset, grandson of the Sir George Wills who purchased Manor House for the University, gave his permission for this motif to be taken from his family's coat of arms and used as part of the badge of the hall. The University also took the "sun in splendour" from the coat of arms of the Wills family when it was granted its coat of arms in 1909.

The lower half is a serpent, "nowed" or coiled. This is a grass snake, and comes from the crest of the Wolstenholme family of Neston. Co. Chester, and Liverpool from whom the current Warden is descended. The serpent is traditionally a symbol of wisdom, healing and learning.

The hall motto comes from Matthew 10:16, "Estote ergo prudentes sicut serpentes, et simplices sicut columbae", (be as wise as serpents and as innocent as doves).

The hall tie has the golden sun of the Wills family placed on a red background. The red is the shade known as Bristol or "Bristowe" red, chosen by the founders of the University for the hoods of all Bristol graduates. "Bristowe Red" is supposed to recall the famous dye used in Mediaeval Bristol, but in fact Sir Isambard Owen, the Vice Chancellor from 1909 to 1921, took the shade from a band of limestone in the Avon Gorge.

== Notable alumni ==
- Dr. Jennifer Bate OBE, concert organist
- Dame Professor Carol Black DBE FRCP, former President of the Royal College of Physicians and current Principal of Newnham College, Cambridge
- Jemima Goldsmith, writer and campaigner
- Mark Ravenhill, playwright, actor and journalist
- David Walliams, comedian and actor
- Matthew Warchus, director and dramatist
- Emily Watson, actress
