= Henry Wills =

Henry Wills may refer to:

- Henry Wills (writer) (1930–1997), British journalist, photographer and writer on local history and archaeology
- Henry Wills (Medal of Honor) (1842–?), United States Army soldier and Medal of Honor recipient
- Henry Herbert Wills (1856–1922), businessman and philanthropist from Bristol
- Henry Overton Wills III (1828–1911), chancellor of the University of Bristol
- Henry Overton Wills II (1800–1871), tobacco merchant
- Henry Overton Wills I (1761–1826), British merchant
- Henry Wills (actor), actor in Return of the Gunfighter
- Henry Wills (MP), member of parliament for Saltash
