= James Wills =

James Wills may refer to:

- James Wills (poet) (1790–1868), Irish writer and poet
- James Anthony Wills (1912–1993), American painter
- James 'Kimo' Wills (born 1975), American actor
- James Wills (baseball), American baseball player
- James Wills (cricketer) (1899–1949), Irish cricketer
- Bob Wills (James Robert Wills, 1905–1975), American Western swing musician, songwriter, and bandleader
- Jim Wills (1914–2007), Australian rules footballer
- J. Elder Wills (James Ernest Elder Wills, 1900–1970), British art director

== See also ==
- James Shaw Willes (1814–1872), English judge
