= Willis =

Willis may refer to:

== Places ==
=== United States ===
- Willis, Florida, an unincorporated community
- Willis, Kansas, a city
- Willis, Michigan, an unincorporated community
- Willis, Nebraska, an unincorporated community
- Willis, Oklahoma, an unincorporated community
- Willis, Texas, a city
- Willis, Floyd County, Virginia, an unincorporated community
- Willis, Russell County, Virginia, an unincorporated community
- Willis River, a tributary of the James River in Virginia

=== Elsewhere ===
- Willis, Grenada, a town
- Willis Island, Coral Sea Islands Territory, Australia
- Willis Islands, South Georgia Islands

== Arts and entertainment ==
=== Works ===
- Giselle or The Willis, a ballet (in the ballet, the Willis are a group of supernatural women)
- Le Villi (The Willis or The Fairies), an opera-ballet composed by Giacomo Puccini
- Willis (album), by The Pietasters

=== Fictional characters ===
- Willis Jackson (character), in the 1970s-1980s American sitcom Diff'rent Strokes
- Willis (Digimon), in the anime series
- Willis the Bouncer, a Martian in the novel Red Planet by Robert A. Heinlein
- Tom and Helen Willis, a fictional couple on the sitcom The Jeffersons
- Willis family, in the Australian soap opera Neighbours
- Private Willis, a soldier in the Gilbert and Sullivan operetta Iolanthe
- Leslie Willis, DC Comics villain Livewire (DC Comics)
- Jeremy Willis, the Scout from Team Fortress 2

== Buildings ==
- Willis Tower, Chicago, the tallest building in the United States and ninth-tallest in the world
- Willis Building (London), a skyscraper
- Willis Building, Ipswich, a lowrise office building

== Companies ==
- Willis & Co., a former Canadian piano company
- Willis Group Holdings, a former insurance broker

== People ==
- Willis (given name), a list of people
- Willis (surname), a list of people

== Other uses ==
- Willis Street, Wellington, New Zealand
- Willis High School, Conroe, Texas, United States
- Ulmus 'Willis', a hybrid elm cultivar

== See also ==
- Wilis (disambiguation)
- Wyllis
- Wills (disambiguation)
- Willes (surname)
