= Wills Township =

Wills Township may refer to:

- Wills Township, LaPorte County, Indiana
- Wills Township, Guernsey County, Ohio

== See also ==
- Will Township, Will County, Illinois
- Wills (disambiguation)
