= John Shepherdson =

British logician

John Cedric Shepherdson, FBA (7 June 1926 – 8 January 2015) was a British logician who was Henry Overton Wills Professor of Mathematics at the University of Bristol from 1976 to 1991.

== Early life and education ==
Shepherdson was born in Huddersfield on 7 June 1926, the son of Arnold Shepherdson, a chemist, and his wife Elsie, née Aspinall. He attended Manchester Grammar School on a scholarship; excelling in mathematics, in 1943 he secured a state scholarship and an open scholarship to Trinity College, Cambridge, where he read mathematics. He graduated with a first-class degree in 1946.

== Career and later life ==
Shepherdson was appointed to an assistant lectureship at the University of Bristol in 1946. He spent the rest of his career at the university, being promoted to lecturer in 1949, reader in 1955 and professor in 1964, before he was finally Henry Overton Wills Professor of Mathematics from 1977 until he retired in 1991. He was elected a fellow of the British Academy in 1990.

Shepherdson was a keen climber and skier. His wife, Margaret, née Smith, a biochemist and academic whom he had married in 1955, died in 2014. Shepherdson died on 8 January 2015.
