= Basil Cottle =

British historian (1917–1994)

Arthur Basil Cottle FSA
- Born: 17 March 1917; Cardiff, Wales, United Kingdom of Great Britain and Ireland
- Died: 13 May 1994 (aged 77); Bristol, England, United Kingdom

Academic background
- Education: University of Wales

Academic work
- Institutions: University of Bristol
- Notable works: Dictionary of Surnames (1967); Triumph of English (1969); Names (1983)

Arthur Basil Cottle FSA (17 March 1917 – 13 May 1994) was a British grammarian, historian and archaeologist. He lived most of his life in Bristol.

== Early life and education ==
Cottle was born in Cardiff on 17 March 1917. He was the younger son of Arthur Bertram Cottle (1881–1964), a clerk, and Cecile Mary Bennett, a schoolmistress. He attended Howard Gardens Secondary School in Cardiff, where his precocious talents came to the notice of Evan Frederic Morgan, 2nd Viscount Tredegar (1893–1949), Welsh poet, author, occultist and convert to Roman Catholicism, who gave Cottle the use of the extensive library at Tredegar House. A prolonged and severe bout of rheumatic fever in his early teens permanently affected his eyesight and he subsequently completely lost sight in his right eye. Notwithstanding this disadvantage, Cottle went on to the University of Wales, where he obtained a double first in English and Latin, and a second in Greek, his favourite subject. Whilst there he became a protege of Dr Victor Erle Nash-Williams (1897–1955), Keeper of the Department of Archaeology at the National Museum of Wales, and lecturer in archaeology from whom he developed a lifelong interest in Roman and early Celtic Christianity and epigraphy. Cottle was encouraged by Nash-Williams to become a museum curator but he eventually trained as a schoolmaster, gaining a first in education at Cardiff, and taught at Cowbridge Grammar School.

== Second World War ==
At the outbreak of the Second World War, Cottle was judged to be medically unfit for active service and instead became a private in the Royal Pioneer Corps, stationed at Huyton. Whilst serving there, in May 1941, he witnessed the Liverpool Custom House burn down in a German air raid. Later, he was transferred to the Royal Army Educational Corps and rose to the rank of Sergeant-Major. In 1942 he was billeted with the Iredale family in Workington while attached to a coastal regiment of the Royal Artillery during his attachment with the AEC. Here he forged a life-long friendship with the two Iredale sisters, one of whom Hilda Queenie, published a volume on Thomas Traherne in 1935 and deepened Cottle's knowledge and appreciation of the work of the Welsh metaphysical poet, Henry Vaughan, "the Silurist". Both Traherne and Vaughan became favourite poets of Cottle's. He later taught generations of Bristol students to appreciate their works.

Eventually Cottle received a commission and was transferred to Bletchley Park in 1943, where he read decoded Enigma messages. In 1945 he was transferred to the Albanian section of the Foreign Office during the civil war between the Zoggists and the Communists. Whilst there, he compiled an Albanian language Grammar and Syntax for use by the Foreign Office. Amongst those who were transferred to his staff was the Bristol-educated linguist, Stuart Edward Mann (1905–1986), who had traveled to Albania in the 1930s, subsequently wrote a historical grammar of Albanian. Mann had a rich fund of anecdotes about the country in general, and of King Zog and his sisters in particular, whose English tutor he had been, and which Cottle frequently and dramatically recounted.

== Academic career ==
In 1946, Cottle took a position as an assistant lecturer in the department of English in the University of Bristol. In 1962, he became a senior lecturer, and in 1976 a reader in mediaeval studies. He taught courses on the Greek lyric, for Professor H. D. F. Kitto, F.B.A. (1897–1982), on pre-Norman Irish art and architecture, the Anglo-Saxons, Middle English, Names, and on the Bristol Romantics. Cottle was an expert on the writings of the Accrington poet Janie Whittaker (1877–1933), and the Welsh Nonconformist minister, the Revd Henry Maurice (1634–1682), an Independent, who had formerly held the living of Church Stretton, and whose journal for the year of Indulgence, 1672, belonged to him.

He described himself as a Welshman, an amateur herald, and an Anglican, and he was immensely proud of his Welsh roots. This led him to bequeath his extensive library to St Woolos Cathedral, Newport, where his remains are buried.

His students at Bristol included the novelist Deborah Moggach, and the Middle English scholar, Thomas Lingen Burton, emeritus professor of English at the University of Adelaide.

Cottle's life-long interest in archaeology led to his involvement in the excavation of Keynsham Abbey by the Bristol Folk House. He became the president of the Bristol and Gloucestershire Archaeological Society and was elected a Fellow of the Society of Antiquaries of London.

A fourth generation Primitive Methodist, the grandson and great-grandson of local preachers, he was confirmed into the Church in Wales in 1942 and thereafter became an active and forceful supporter of the liturgy of the Established Church, the Book of Common Prayer, the 39 Articles, and the Authorized Version of the Bible. Successively churchwarden of four Bristol churches – St. Mary Redcliffe; St. Paul's (the centre of the Anglican Chaplaincy to the university); St. George's, Brandon Hill; and latterly Christ Church with St Ewen, Broad Street – he was an active member of the Bristol Diocesan Advisory Committee for the Care of Churches. He befriended numerous clergy and ordinands in the diocese, and through his roles as Sub Warden, successively at Wills Hall (1947–1948), and from 1948 to 1972 at Burwalls.

Following his retirement in 1982 he remained active as a lecturer and reviewer, and in 1987 a group of his former colleagues and students celebrated his contribution to the study of Middle English by presenting him with a festschrift, Medieval Literature and Antiquities: Studies in Honour of Basil Cottle, edited by Myra Stokes and T.L. Burton.

His extensive private and academic papers are held in the Special Collections of the University of Bristol, class mark GB 3 DM 1582

== Works ==
- The Life of a University (by Basil Cottle and J W Sherborne – J. W. Arrowsmith for The University of Bristol, 1951, 1957)
- St. Mary Redcliffe, Bristol (Mardon, Son & Hall, Bristol, 1957)
- The Life (1770–1853), Writings and Literary Relationships of Joseph Cottle of Bristol (Unpublished Ph.D. thesis, University of Bristol, 1958)
- City of Bristol’’ one of three articles in ‘’Bristol: A Booklet to Commemorate the Seventy-Ninth Annual Meeting of the Society of Chemical Industry (J W Arrowsmith for the Chemical Industry, 1960)
- Thomas Chatterton (Historical Association – Bristol Branch, 1963)
- The Penguin Dictionary of Surnames (Penguin, 1967)
- The Triumph of English 1350–1400 (History and Literature Series – Blandford Press, 1969)
- The Plight of English (Arlington House, 1975)
- Robert Southey (Historical Association – Bristol Branch, 1980)
- Names (Thames & Hudson, 1983)
- The Language of Literature: English Grammar in Action (Macmillan, 1985)
- Joseph Cottle of Bristol (Historical Association – Bristol Branch, 1987)
- Medieval Literature and Antiquities: Studies in Honour of Basil Cottle edited by Myra F. K. Stokes & T. L. Burton (D S Brewer, 1987)
- All the Cathedrals of France, edited by Nicholas A. Lee (Unicorn Press, 2002)
- "Joseph Cottle and the Romantics: The Life of a Bristol Publisher", edited by Myra F. K. Stokes (Bristol, Redcliffe Press, 2008)
- A Grand Gossip: the Bletchley Park Diary of Basil Cottle 1943–1945, edited by James and Judith Hodsdon (Hobnob Press, 2017)
