= Wills Hall =

Student residence of the University of Bristol

- University of Bristol
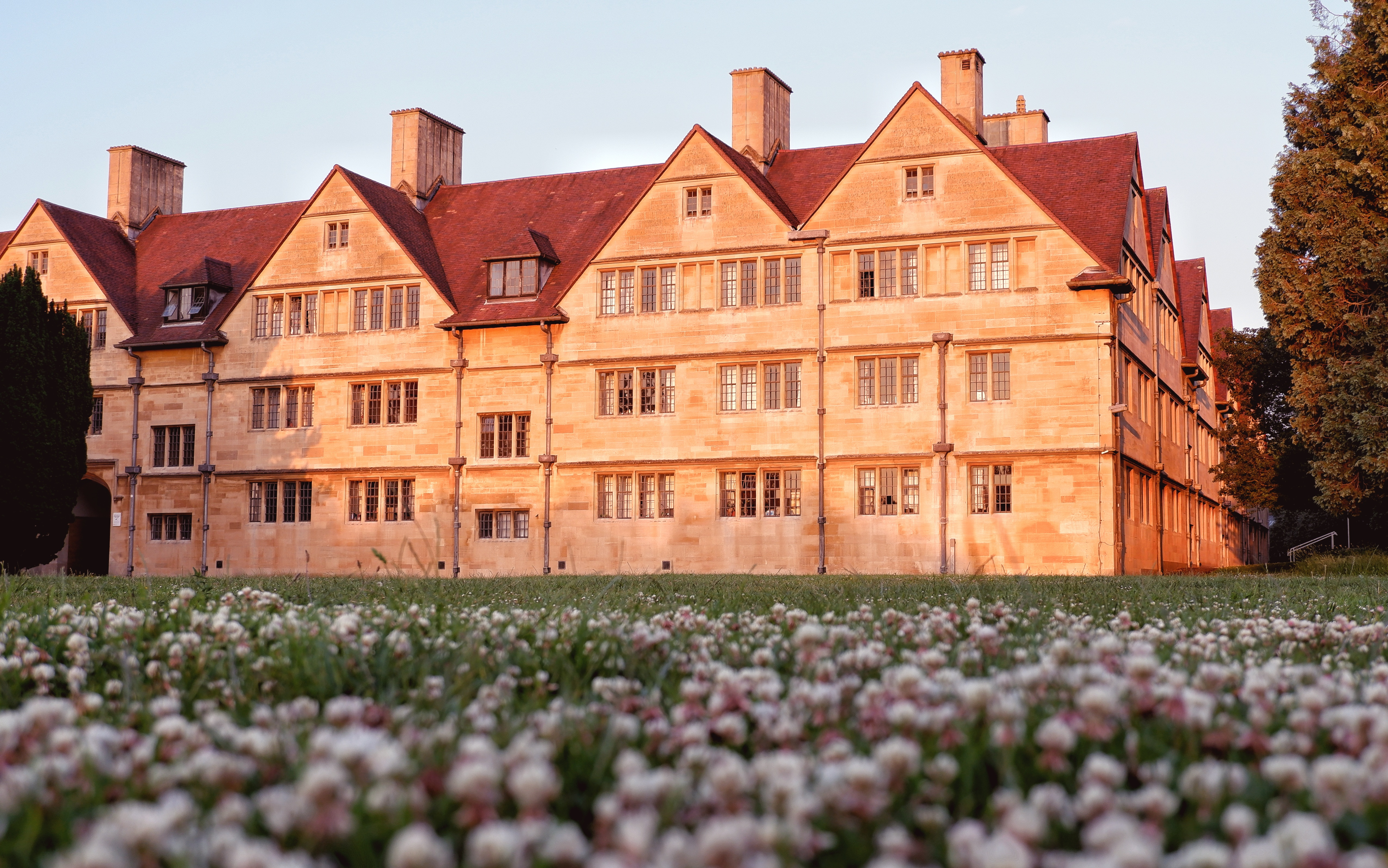
- Outside Old Quad as seen from centre lawn
- Location: Stoke Bishop, Bristol, England
- Coordinates: 51.4784°N 2.6229°W
- Motto: Pro Aris et Focis (Latin)
- Motto in English: For our altars and our hearths
- Founder: George Alfred Wills
- Established: 1929
- Architect: Sir George Oatley
- Warden: abolished
- Residents: 370
- Website: www.bris.ac.uk/Depts/Wills/home.htm

Map
- Location within Bristol

Wills Hall is one of more than twenty halls of residence in the University of Bristol. It is located high on the Stoke Bishop site on the edge of the Bristol Downs, and houses c. 370 students in two quadrangles. Almost all of these students are in their first year of study.

== History ==
The name Wills Hall reflects the university's connection with the Wills family. The fortune made by their famous tobacco empire, W. D. & H. O. Wills and later Imperial Tobacco, enabled Henry Overton Wills III to fund the university's foundation in 1908 with a pledge of £100,000 and he financed many of its finest buildings, such as the Wills Memorial Building. His son George Alfred Wills provided the money to build a hall of residence in memory of his brother Henry Herbert Wills on the site of Downside House, formerly the residence of the Georges, a family of Bristol brewers.

George Alfred Wills originally planned to base the residence around Goldney Hall in Clifton, next to Clifton Hill House. However, the Warden of the all-female Clifton Hill House felt that having so many young men so close to her residents would pose a significant risk and demanded that the new hall be sited at least two miles away. Thus Downside House in Stoke Bishop was purchased, and a quadrangle of accommodation blocks erected around it according to the design of Sir George Oatley, with the rooms arranged on staircases (called "houses", A to N). It has been designated by English Heritage as a grade II listed building. A Latin inscription on the exterior of the dining hall dedicated the hall to Henry Herbert.

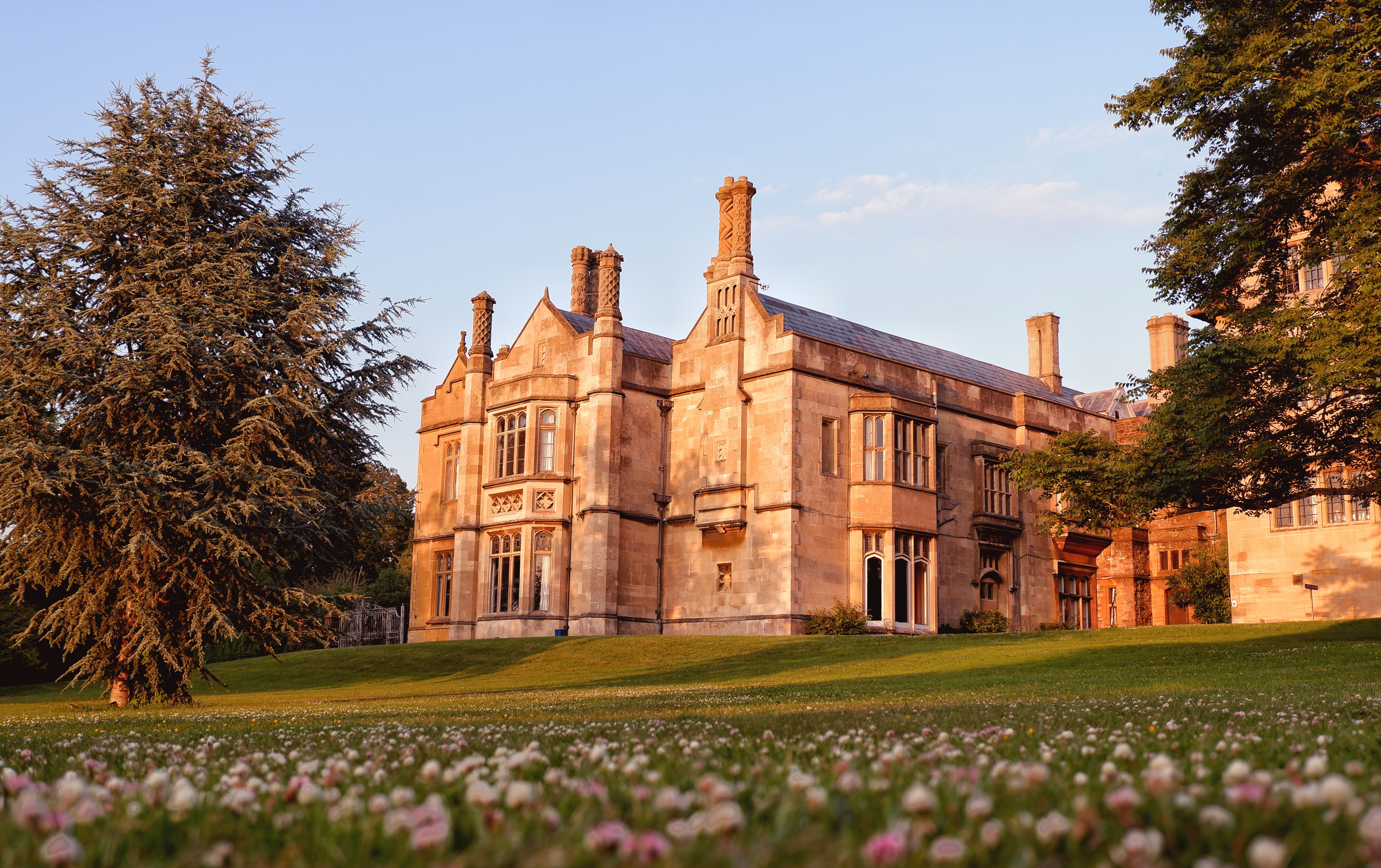
Downside House, once the Warden's Lodge, now temporary staff accommodation

Wills Hall was officially opened by Winston Churchill in 1929, then the Chancellor of the university. When he returned to open Churchill Hall in the late 1950s, he allowed himself to be "kidnapped" and his "release" was allowed only after he signed the following statement, that used to be displayed in the Warden's House at Wills, but which is now in the university's Special Collections Department:

"I Winston Spencer Churchill MP, CH Chancellor of the University of Bristol, Declare There be No Finer Hostel Than Wills Hall Among The Universities of the British Empire".

The initial quadrangle sufficed until rising student numbers precipitated the building of a further accommodation block, an L-shaped configuration of three linked houses (X, Y and Z) which was opened in 1961. Another expansion, in 1990, included a further accommodation block arranged on three floors (U, V and W), which featured en-suite rooms and a conference centre, the better to place the university in the conference market, which was becoming an important source of revenue. Together with X, Y and Z houses, the new development completed a quadrangle now known as New Quad, the original accommodation being Old Quad.

Wills was founded as an all-male institution and was the last hall to accept both sexes: it went mixed in 1985, despite opposition from some traditionalists, but with the enthusiastic support of most students. In that year, 70 women took up residence alongside 200 men, and over the next few years the numbers of women residents rose quickly.

In 2003, as part of the national controversy surrounding claims that British universities were discriminating in favour of public school applicants, The Observer ran an article purporting to highlight class-strife and prejudice in Wills. Letters in reply followed the next week vigorously defending Wills.

In 2008 a Harrow-educated undergraduate at Wills Hall crashed a Mini Cooper in the grounds of the Hall while intoxicated.

The 2012 BBC television film The Best of Men was filmed at Wills Hall, Manor Hall and Goldney Hall in Bristol.

In 2017 there were allegedly incidents of drink-spiking in the Hall's "welcome week", widely reported in the press. None could be medically confirmed as spiking. The Warden and other pastoral staff responded quickly and firmly and no further incidents were reported.

In December 2017 the university announced a new model for pastoral support in the residences, which included the abolition of the posts of Warden, Deputy Warden and Student Support Adviser. The decision to implement a new system of pastoral care generated significant controversy, reflected in the national and local press, partly in the light of Bristol University's regrettable record of student suicides. The first proposals by the university were modified in February 2018. Students resident in Wills Hall were very prominent in the debate surrounding the changes, leading on a petition that secured thousands of signatures and publishing in student and national newspapers. No action was taken by the university in response to this petition.

== Facilities ==
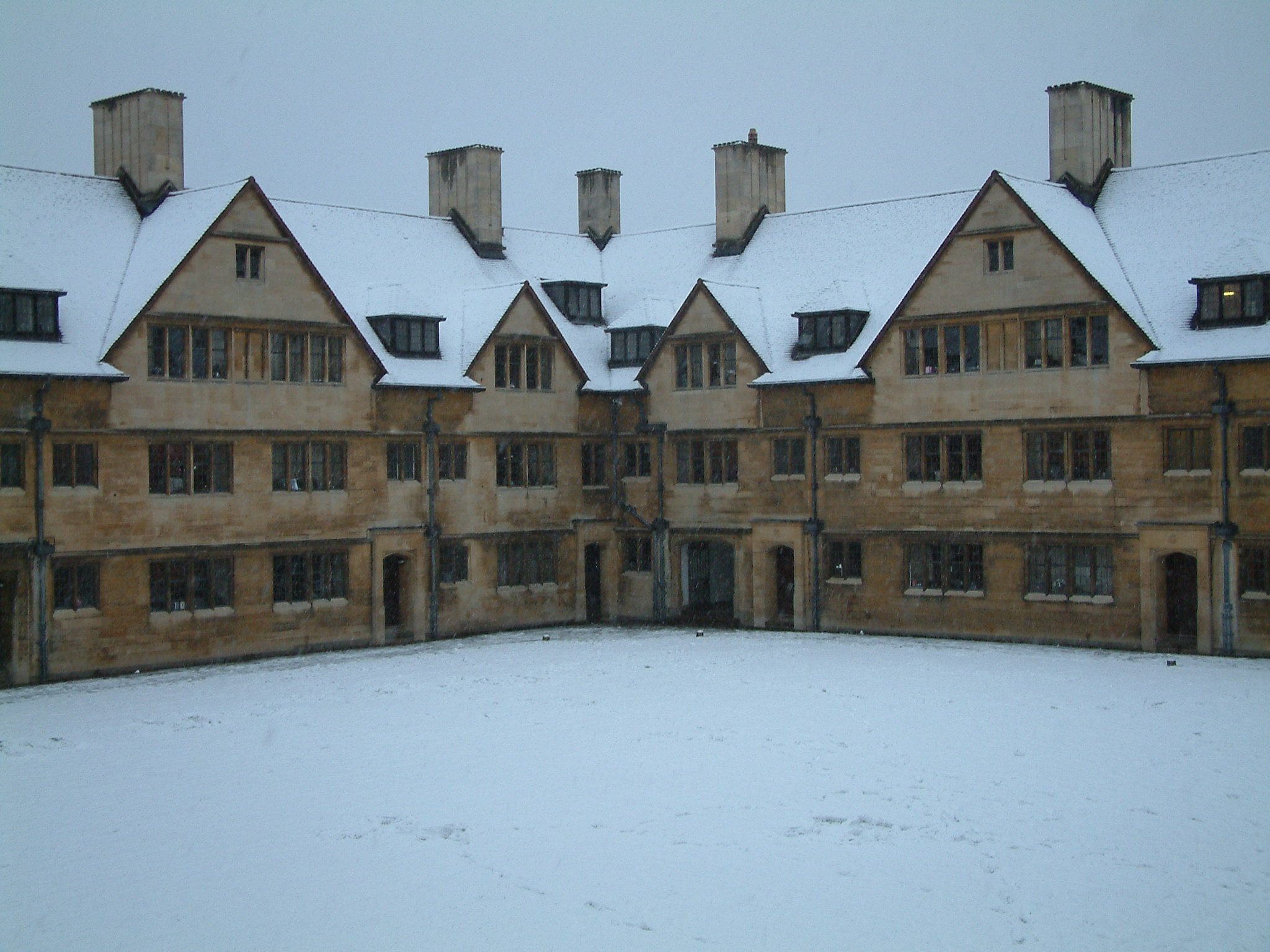
The Old Quad in the snow

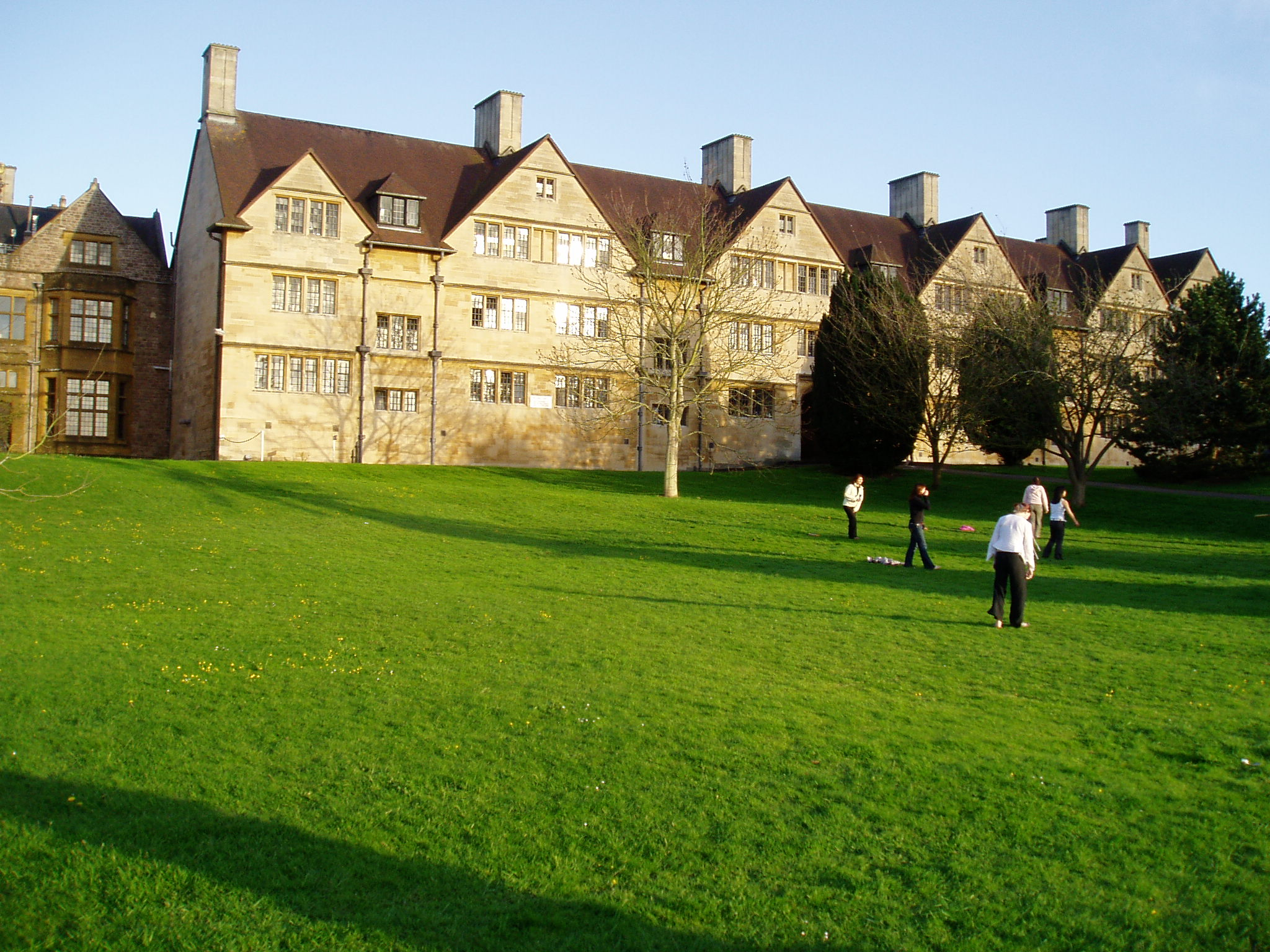
Back of Old Quad as seen from the Cedar Lawn

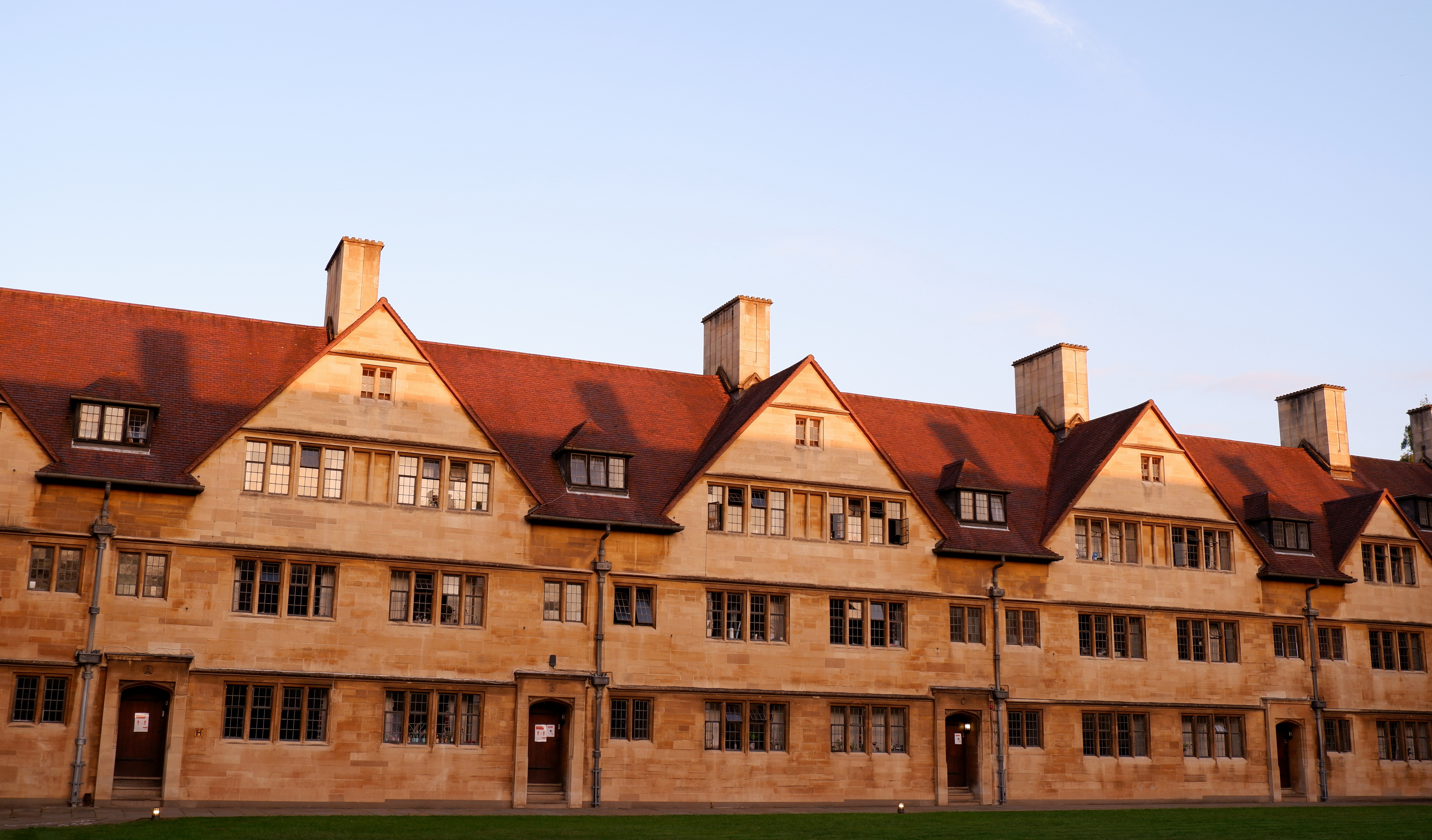
Photo of residence blocks

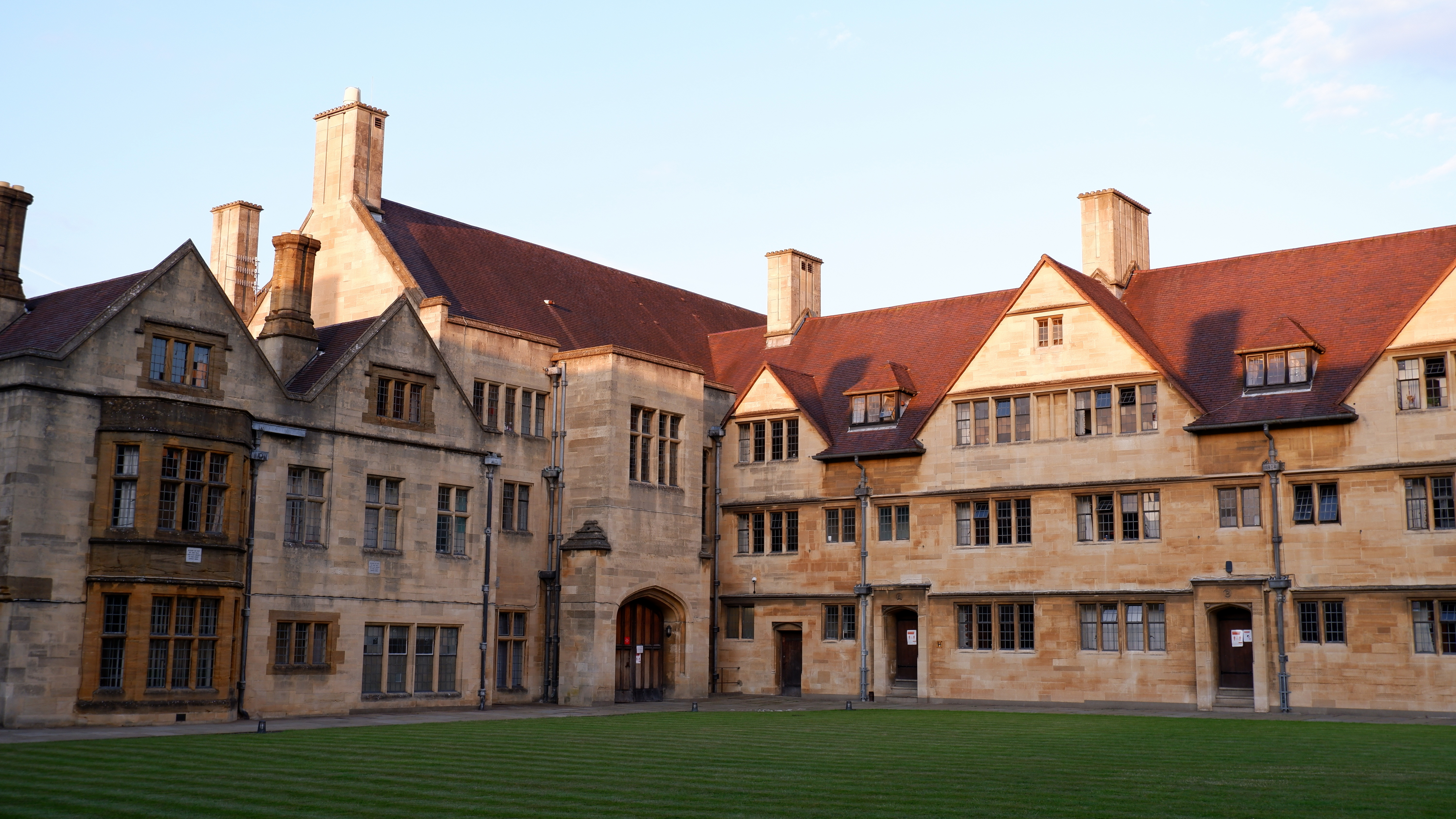
Photo of the gatehouse

Wills Hall has a bar that is open about twice a term and staffed by students. The bar also hosts JCR quizzes, film nights, sports broadcasts and other events. There are theme-nights, including alcohol-free events, "Bond Night", and a "White Party" for the whole hall.

The Monica Wills Chapel was opened in 1930. It hosts a number of services a week (e.g. evensong, compline) for students from all the Stoke Bishop halls, usually on Friday evenings during term-time, and there are well-attended Christmas and Armistice events. It is also used to stage plays and concerts, and houses a grand piano and a harpsichord as well as a fully refurbished organ.

Wills Hall has an oak-panelled dining room, often likened to that of an Oxbridge college, and the Hall's architect, Sir George Oatley, deliberately took inspiration from the proportions and styles of certain Oxford Colleges when making his designs.

The Hall houses tennis and squash courts that are shared with the other halls on the Stoke Bishop Site; there is a croquet lawn (used for an annual croquet tournament, the "Morton / Relph cup"), a table tennis room, and an oak-panelled billiard room. The billiard room was constructed when Downside House was extended in the late 19th century and the fireplace still has the original De Morgan tiles.

== Motto ==
Over the main entrance to Wills Hall can be seen a shield emblazoned with the Wills family crest and their motto "Pro Aris et Focis". This Latin phrase literally means "for our altars and our hearths", but is used by ancient authors to express attachment to all that was most dear and venerable.

== Societies and clubs ==
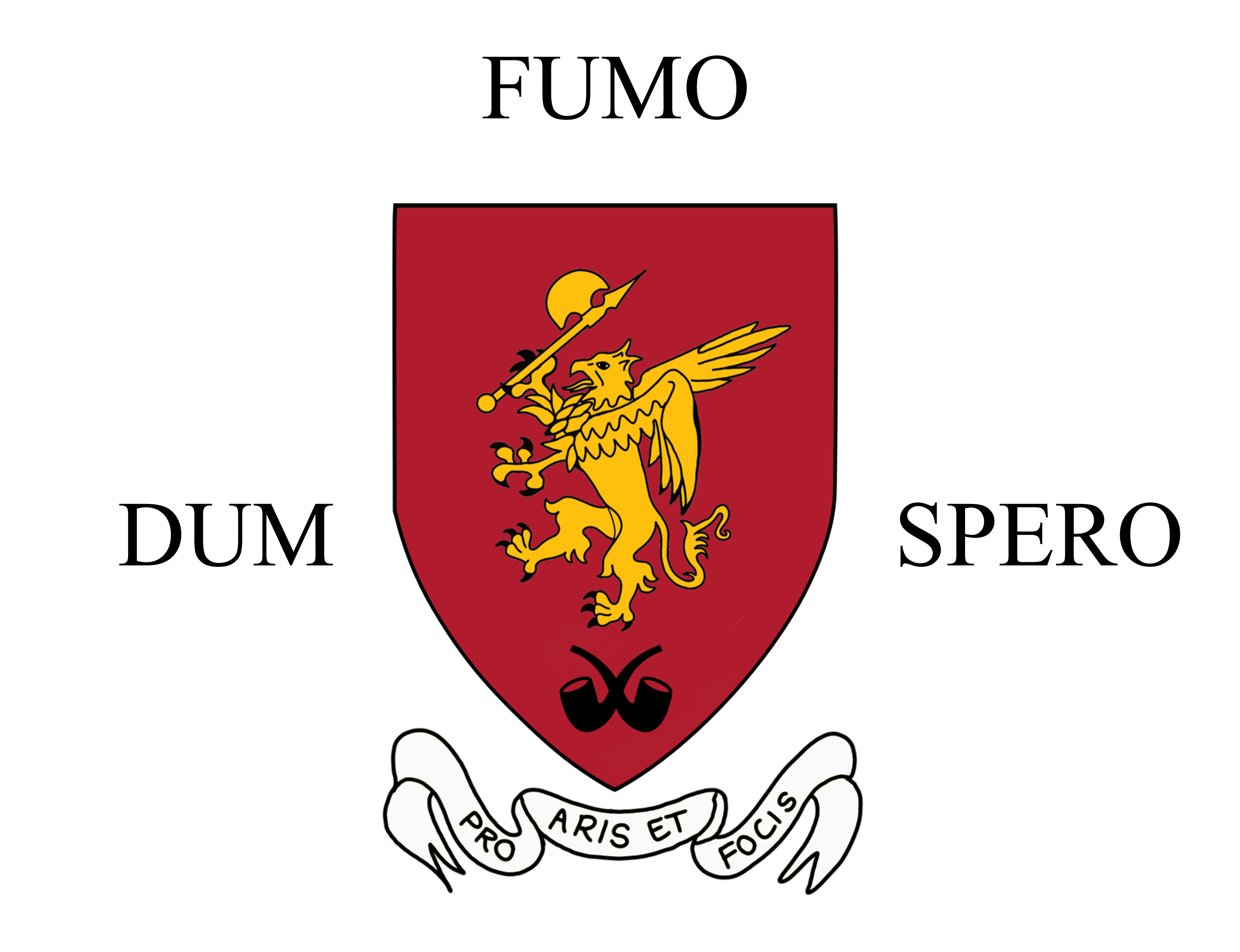
Barneys Club Crest

The discussion club "Barneys" (named after a brand of tobacco that rivalled the Wills products), was founded in December 1931 and is still active, with fortnightly speaker-meetings on Sundays in term time. Historically, club meetings or "meets" consisted of a member presenting a topic of interest while other students relax over glasses of port and smoke pipes. The Barneys Club traditionally holds an annual dinner at which a distinguished guest delivers a speech.

The Hall's theatrical society, the Wills Hall Amateur Theatrical Society (WHATS), performs musicals, plays and variety shows for audiences from the Stoke Bishop halls and beyond. Recent productions include Jez Butterworth's Jerusalem in 2016.

Wills Hall used to publish its own newsletter, The Executor, which was edited by students in hall and was published several times a year. This was the successor to the Wills Hall Loo Sheet, a newsletter that took its name from the fact that it was distributed by being posted in all communal lavatories around the hall. In 2015, a satirical newspaper called The Oracle was published for two issues before being shut down.

== Wardens ==
There have been ten Wardens of Wills Hall, the last being made redundant in August 2018, a year short of the Hall's 90th anniversary:

- Harry Norton Matthews (1929–1935)
- Richard Keigwin (1935–1945)
- Oliver Kendall (1945–1959)
- John Sloane (1959–1973)
- Arthur Graves (1973–1982)
- Sean Gill (1982–1991)
- Phyllida Parsloe (1991–1997)
- Donald Shell (1997–2009)
- Julian Rivers (2009–2015)
- Robert Vilain (2015–2018)

Notable sub-wardens include the British grammarian, historian and archaeologist Arthur Basil Cottle FSA and winner of the Nobel Prize in Physics Cecil Frank Powell FRS.

== Notable former students ==
- James Blunt, musician
- Derren Brown, illusionist
- Henry Chilver, Baron Chilver FRS, Engineer and former Vice-Chancellor of Cranfield University
- Sir Liam Donaldson, former Chief Medical Officer for England
- Peter Estlin, 691st Lord Mayor of London (2018–2019)
- David Gibbins, author
- Peter Haggett, geographer and academic
- Bob Marshall-Andrews KC, MP (Labour)
- Laura Tomlinson, Olympic gold-medalist (team dressage)
- Georgie Twigg, Olympic gold-medalist (hockey)
- Eboni Usoro-Brown, international netball player
- Stephen Williams, MP (Liberal Democrat)
