= Wyllis =

Wyllis is both a surname and a given name. Notable people with the name include:

== People with the surname ==
- Francis Wyllis (died 1597), English academic administrator and dean
- George Wyllis (1590–1645), American governor
- Mason Wyllis (2003-Present), Former Collegiate American football player at Concordia University Ann Arbor (MI). Mason is currently a College Football coach at University of Minnesota, Twin Cities.

== People with the given name ==
- Wyllis Cooper (1899–1955), American writer and producer
- Edward Wyllis Scripps (1854–1926), American newspaper publisher

== See also ==
- Willis (disambiguation)
