= George Oatley =

English architect (1863–1950)

Sir George Oatley
- Born: George Herbert Oatley; 3 January 1863; Bristol, England
- Died: 12 May 1950 (aged 87); Bristol, England
- Occupation: Architect
- Practice: Oatley and Lawrence, Oatley and Brentnall

Sir George Herbert Oatley FRIBA (3 January 1863 – 12 May 1950) was an English architect noted for his work in Bristol, especially the gothic Wills Memorial Building. He was knighted for public service in 1925.

== Early life ==
Oatley was born in Bristol in 1863, and after working as an apprentice to the architect Thomas Dashwood, he became a junior draughtsman for the local firm Godwin and Crisp, at the age of 16. Oatley became Henry Crisp's partner aged only 26, when Godwin left the firm, and at the same time married Edith Lawrence.

== Work for Bristol University ==
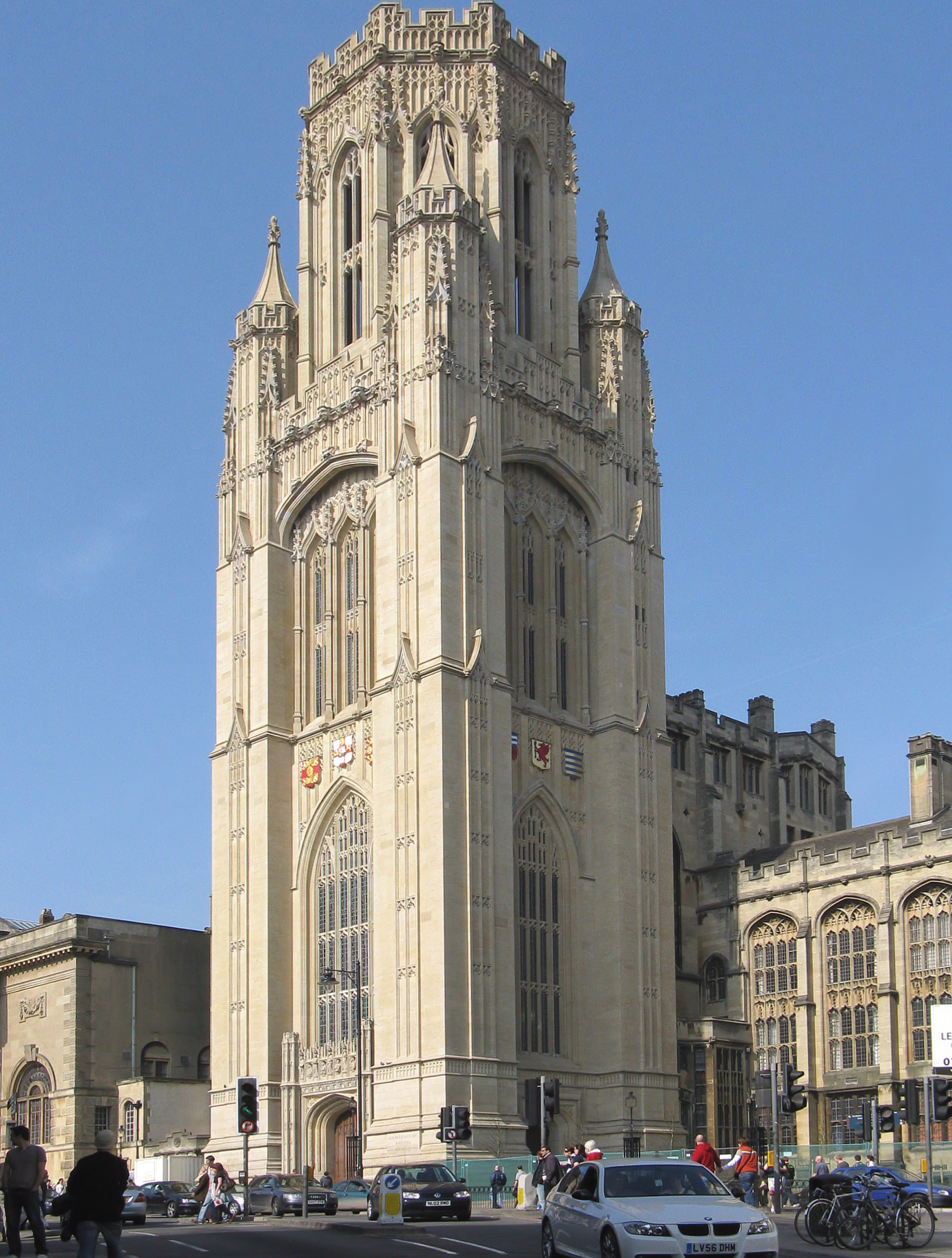
The Wills Memorial Building on Park Street, Bristol. The tower was cleaned in 2006–2007.

His major break came with his appointment as Architect to the University of Bristol. One of his first projects, and probably the major one of his career, was to design the Wills Memorial Building to be a landmark for the new university, in 1912. He produced an imposing design in the Perpendicular Gothic style. Building was begun in 1915, and after being delayed through World War I, it was finally completed in 1925. Oatley was knighted in the 1925 Birthday Honours in recognition of his work.

His other work for the university included the H.H. Wills Physics Department, started in 1926 and opened in 1930; Wills Hall, a student hall of residence in Stoke Bishop in 1925; and Manor Hall, a student hall of residence in Clifton in (1932).

== Medical buildings ==
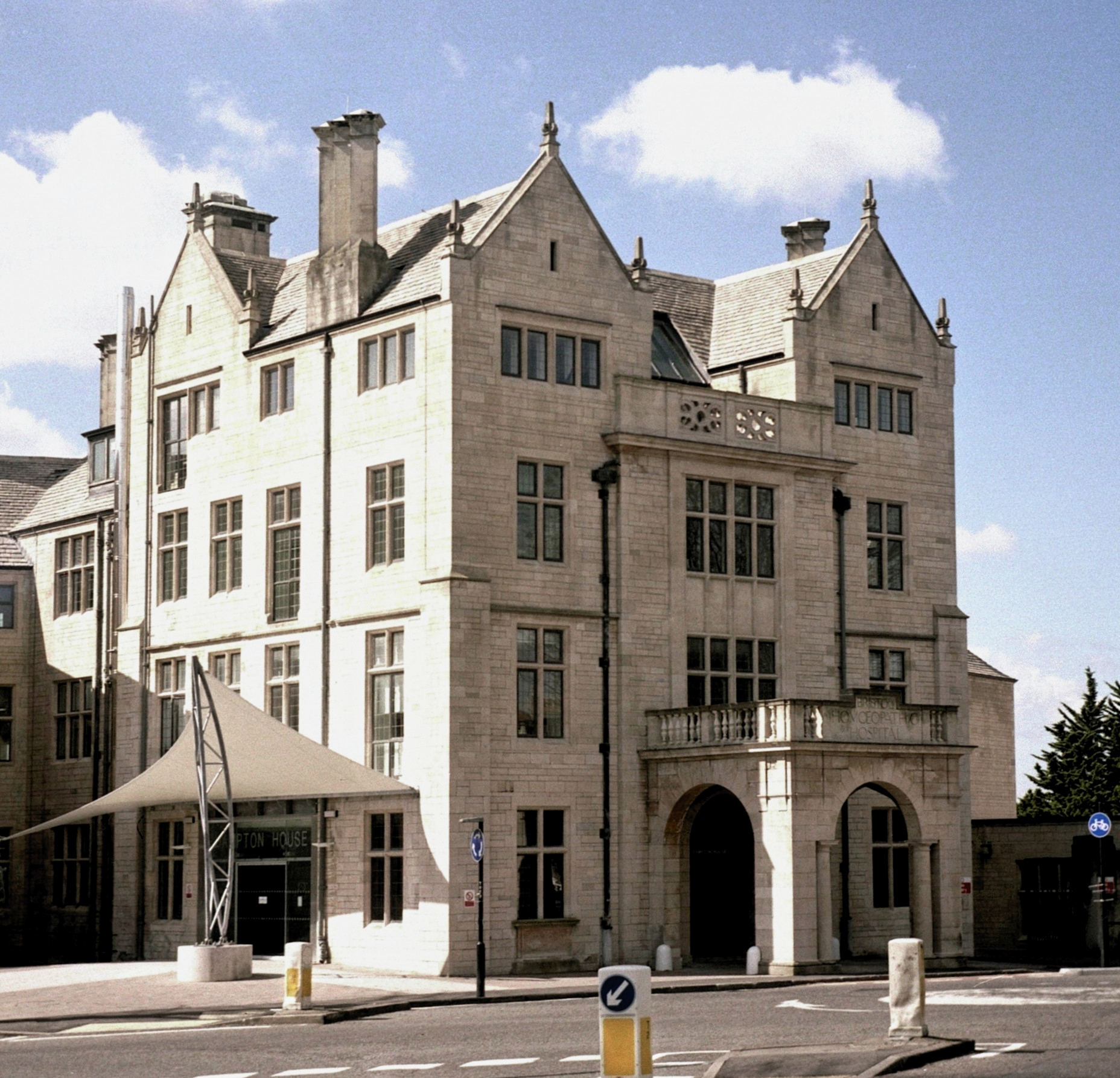
The former Bristol Homeopathic Hospital.

Oatley's works included the design of several mental hospitals throughout the country, including Winwick Asylum in Lancashire, the City of Cardiff Asylum at Whitchurch, Barrow Mental Hospital at Barrow Gurney, and extensions to the Beaufort War Hospital at Stapleton. He also designed the Bristol Homeopathic Hospital in 1908, (now the University of Bristol's Student Health Centre) and worked on improvements to the Bristol Royal Infirmary.

== Church buildings ==
Oatley's keen Christian faith is reflected in the large amount of work he did for local churches. He designed the mission hall of St Anne's in Greenbank (1900–01), Bristol Baptist College (1913–1915), St Davids Welsh Anglican Church 1896 Feeder Road (demolished 1923) due to poor foundations. Oatley also designed New Buckingham Baptist in 1903 demolished for student accommodation c2002. St Edyth's in Sea Mills (1926–28) and Sea Mills Methodist Church (1931). Other projects included work on St. Mary Redcliffe church and the New Room, John Wesley's original Methodist chapel. Oatley was also involved in raising financial support for various Christian causes.

== Other work ==
Local Bristol firms also benefited from Oatley's designing talents, such as the J. S. Fry & Sons chocolate company, for whom he designed several factories, and the Bristol Wagon Works.

In 1927 he was commissioned by Clifton High School to design a new wing to commemorate 50 years of the school

Oatley had worked on his own throughout his most prolific period, only joined by his brother-in-law George C. Lawrence in 1926. Ralph H. Brentnall joined the company in 1947, but it was only three years later that Oatley died in 1950. He had been based at 12 Great George Street, Bristol for the majority of his career.

Oatley lived at an arts and crafts house, Barton Rocks, in Somerset, which he had built early in the 20th century. The house remained in his family until 1976.
