= John Willes =

John Willes may refer to:

- John Willes (judge) (1685–1761), British Attorney General and Chief Justice of Common Pleas, also a Member of Parliament, 1724–1737
- James Shaw Willes, a British judge
- John Willes (1721–1784), British Member of Parliament, 1746–1761
- John Willes (cricketer) (1778–1852), English cricketer
