= Robert Vilain =

British literary scholar

Robert Vilain is a British literary scholar and Professor of German and Comparative Literature at the University of Oxford since 2025. Between 2021 and 2026 he was Fellow and Senior Tutor of St Hugh's College, Oxford. Previously he was Professor of German and Comparative Literature at the University of Bristol, and Director of the AHRC-funded South, West and Wales Doctoral Training Partnership, a consortium of nine universities and National Museum Wales dedicated to funding and training PhD students. He is currently Lecturer in German at Christ Church, Oxford, and responsible for the College's teaching in German.

Previous posts include a personal chair in German and Comparative Literature at Royal Holloway, University of London, three years as Head of the School of Modern Languages at Bristol, the Wardenship of Wills Hall, and a period as Co-Director of the South-West Consortium of the UK's Routes into Languages scheme. He has held a number of fellowships, including a residency at Columbia University's Reid Hall in Paris and one sponsored by Princeton University Library, which resulted in an important re-evaluation of Delacroix's illustrations for an early edition of Goethe's Faust in French. Due to his status as the last Warden of Wills Hall, he is often known simply as 'The Warden'.

Vilain attended Solihull School in the West Midlands as a Foundation Scholar before reading French and German at Christ Church, Oxford. He obtained a BA with first-class honours, an MA and a DPhil from Oxford, and conducted some of his doctoral research at the University of Bonn. His first academic post was at the Victoria University of Manchester, he moved to Royal Holloway, University of London in 1992, and joined the University of Bristol in 2010 before returning to Oxford in 2021.

Specialising in 19th- and 20th-century German, Austrian and French literature, especially poetry, Vilain is the author and editor of numerous books and articles. He is Joint Editor of Studies in Modern German and Austrian Literature for Peter Lang, and was for three years Germanic Editor of the UK-based journal Modern Language Review, having formerly co-edited Austrian Studies with Judith Beniston. He reviews for the Times Literary Supplement and appears occasionally on BBC Radio 3, BBC television and other public discussion fora to discuss German literature and culture.

Vilain is married to Patience Robinson and they have three children.

== Publications ==
- Robertson, Eric; Vilain, Robert, eds. (1997). Yvan Goll – Claire Goll: Text and Contexts. Amsterdam; Atlanta, GA: Rodopi. ISBN 978-9042001893.
- Chernaik, Warren; Swales, Martin; Vilain, Robert, eds. (2000). The Art of Detective Fiction. London: Macmillan. ISBN 978-0333746011.
- Vilain, Robert (2000). The Poetry of Hugo von Hofmannsthal and French Symbolism. Oxford: Clarendon Press. ISBN 978-0198160038.
- Kramer, Andreas; Vilain, Robert, eds. (2006). Yvan Goll: A Bibliography of the Primary Works. Bern: P. Lang. ISBN 978-3906766461.
- Leeder, Karen; Vilain, Robert, eds. (2010). The Cambridge Companion to Rilke. Cambridge University Press. ISBN 978-0521705080.
- Leeder, Karen; Vilain, Robert, eds. (2010). Nach Duino: Die späte Lyrik Rainer Maria Rilkes (in German). Göttingen: Wallstein. ISBN 978-3835304253.
- Rilke, Rainer Maria (2010). Vilain, Robert (ed.). Selected Poems. Translated by Susan Ranson and Marielle Sutherland. Oxford University Press. ISBN 978-0199569410.
- Rilke, Rainer Maria (2016). Vilain, Robert (ed.). The Notebooks of Malte Laurids Brigge. Translated by Robert Vilain. Oxford University Press. ISBN 978-0199646036.
- Vilain, Robert (2017). Yvan Goll: The Thwarted Pursuit of the Whole. Taylor & Francis Group. ISBN 978-1907975561.
