= James Wills (baseball) =

American baseball player

- Catcher

Negro league baseball debut
- 1910, for the Minneapolis Keystones

Last appearance
- 1911, for the Minneapolis Keystones

Teams
- Minneapolis Keystones (1910–1911)

James Wills was an American Negro league catcher in the 1910s.

Wills played for the Minneapolis Keystones in 1910 and 1911. In three recorded games, he posted three hits in 14 plate appearances.
