= Willis (given name) =

Willis is a masculine given name which may refer to the following people:

== Men ==
- Willis Ball, American architect
- Willis Barnstone (born 1927), American poet and translator
- Willis Bouchey (1907–1977), American actor
- Willis B. Burns (1851–1915), American businessman and politician
- Willis Carrier (1876–1950), American engineer and inventor, best known for inventing modern air conditioning
- Willis Carto (1926–2015), American far right activist and Holocaust denier
- Willis Conover (1920–1996), jazz producer and longtime broadcaster on the Voice of America
- Willis Gibson (born 2010), American Tetris player
- Willis Goldbeck (1898–1979), American screenwriter and film director
- Willis Griffith, American politician
- Willis Hall (1929–2005), English playwright and radio and television writer
- Willis Harman (1918–1997), American engineer, social scientist, academic, futurist and writer
- Willis A. Hawkins (died 1886), justice of the Georgia Supreme Court
- Willis Nichols Hawley (1875–1898), American soldier
- Willis Hudlin (1906–2002), Major League Baseball pitcher
- Willis Jackson, Baron Jackson of Burnley (1904–1970), British technologist and electrical engineer
- Willis Jackson (saxophonist) (1932–1987), American jazz tenor saxophonist
- Willis Knuckles (1946–2014), Liberian politician
- Willis Linn Jepson (1867–1946), American botanist
- Willis Lamb (1913–2008), American physicist and Nobel laureate
- Willis Augustus Lee (1888–1945), vice-admiral of the United States Navy and Olympic Games sport shooter
- Willis McGahee (born 1981), National Football League running back
- Willis H. O'Brien (1886–1962), Irish-American pioneering motion picture special effects artist
- Willis Peguese (born 1966), American football player
- Willis Polk (1867–1924), American architect
- Willis Reed (1942–2023), American basketball player, coach and general manager
- Willis Robards (1873–1921), American actor, film director, and film producer
- Willis H. Stephens (1925–2024), American politician
- Willis Stephens, Jr. (born 1955), American politician, son of the above
- Willis Van Devanter (1859–1941), an associate justice of the United States Supreme Court
- Willis Ward (1912-1983?), African-American track and field athlete and football player, lawyer and judge

== Women ==
- Willis Marie Van Schaack, birth name of Lili St. Cyr (1918–1999), American burlesque dancer and stripper
