= John Wills =

John Wills may refer to:

- John Wills (academic administrator) (died 1806), English academic administrator at the University of Oxford
- John Wills (architect) (1846–1906), English architect based in Derby
- John Wills (politician) (born 1966), Iowa State Representative
