= Henry Wills (writer) =

British journalist and photographer (1930–1997)

Henry Herbert Wills (6 December 1930 – 1 April 1997) was a British journalist and photographer with a passion for local history and archaeology. He is best remembered for his writings on British anti-invasion preparations of the Second World War, his most often cited work being Pillboxes: A Study of U.K. Defences, 1940. His interest in the topic was triggered when, in 1968, as a photographer for the Salisbury Times, he was sent on a journalistic assignment to photograph the demolition of a pillbox. His inquiries led him to conclude that there were few official records of Britain's wartime defences.

After some further investigation and some publicity on radio and in newspapers, he planned and organised the first nationwide survey of Britain's WW2 defences. With the help of many volunteers, more than 5,000 defence sites were recorded.

The value of Henry Wills' work was acknowledged by the British Archaeological Trust and the British Broadcasting Corporation which awarded him the Chronicle Award in 1979. After 15 years of work, he published Pillboxes in 1985.

Wills' work stimulated the interest of many enthusiasts and academics including local historians and former soldiers. Their interest was given further impetus by the realisation that these under-appreciated remains were disappearing at an alarming rate – mostly because of demolition to make way for new developments. A project to make a comprehensive survey of all 20th-century defence works throughout the UK was formed. Between April 1995 and December 2001 the Defence of Britain Project, with funds from the national Heritage Lottery Fund, compiled thousands of records. The project also resulted in the discovery of many previously unsuspected contemporary records.

His papers now comprise the Henry Wills Collection at the Historic England Archive in Swindon.

Wills died on 1 April 1997, aged 66.
