= Frederick Wills =

Frederick Wills may refer to:

- Sir Frederick Wills, 1st Baronet (1838–1909), director of W.D. & H.O. Wills, which later merged into the Imperial Tobacco Company, Liberal Unionist MP
- Frederick Wills (cinematographer) (1870–1955), pioneering Australian cinematographer
- Frederick Wills (Guyana) (died 1992), foreign affairs minister of Guyana in 1970
- Frederick Noel Hamilton Wills (1887–1927), English educator
