= Robert Wills =

Robert Wills may refer to:

- Robert Cooper Wills, Irish Anglican priest
- Robert Wills (cricketer), Irish cricketer
- Robbie Wills, member of the Arkansas House of Representatives

== See also ==
- Bob Wills (James Robert Wills), American Western swing musician, songwriter, and bandleader
- Bobby Wills, Canadian country music singer-songwriter
