= James Anthony Wills =

American painter

James Anthony Wills (June 13, 1912 – November 10, 1993) was an American painter. He worked only in oils and never had any formal art training.

== Early years ==
Wills was born in Philadelphia, Pennsylvania and could draw before he could write. At age 8, Wills started with tempera, watercolor and pastels, and later chose oils. His choice of oils was based on the masters' use of oils and its stability over time. He never used canvas. Masonite (hardboard) was used instead as it does not deteriorate like canvas. Wills sold his first portrait of a neighborhood friend to the boy's mother when he was 14.

== Painter of Presidents and other political figures ==
He has painted cabinet members including George C. Marshall, Secretary of Defense, C. E. Wilson, Secretary of Defense, and Henry Kissinger, Secretary of State. However, his greater works are his long list of Presidential Portraits. He has painted Harry Truman, Dwight D. Eisenhower, and Richard Nixon. Along the stairway to the East Room hang the portraits of 20th-century Presidents. Displayed here are Wills' Harry Truman and Richard Nixon.

== Other notable portraits ==
Wills' works were often commissioned by large firms. He had a way of capturing the likeness and 'realness' of a person especially as seen in the hands. "Everyone has a best angle, though, and my job is to analyze what these angles are. if posed properly, a person can be made a handsome figure. A person is entitled to this." - Wills. Additional portraits include golfer Ben Hogan, Indianapolis 500 Speedway owner Anton Hulman Jr., Detroit Tigers Baseball Club owner Walter Briggs, Jr., Philip Wrigley of Wrigley Gum Company, Clark Hungerford, railroad executive and Bessie Mae Pederson (wife of Roy Pederson) of Houston, Texas

Wills charged about $7,500 for a portrait painted from life. He often had a large role in what his clients wore for their portrait.

== Sources ==
- Texas Magazine, November 12, 1967
