= Henry Overton Wills III =

British businessman

Chancellor of the University of Bristol
- In office 1909–1911
- President: Conwy Lloyd Morgan; Sir Isambard Owen
- Preceded by: Office created
- Succeeded by: Richard Burdon Haldane, 1st Viscount Haldane

Personal details
- Born: 22 December 1828 Bristol, England
- Died: 4 September 1911 (aged 82) Bath, Somerset, England
- Occupation: Businessman

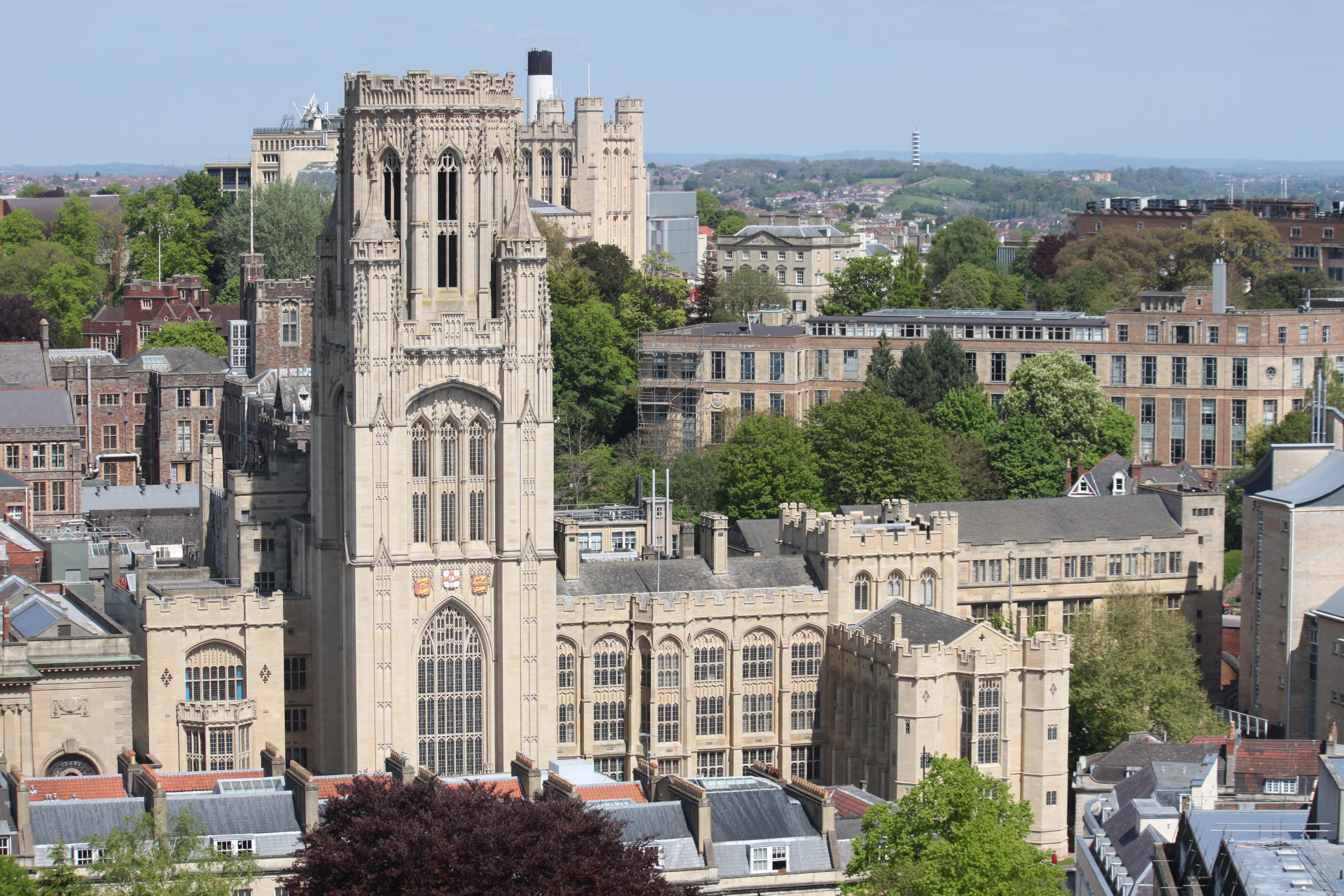
The cathedral-like Wills Memorial Building in Bristol, built in memory of Henry Overton Wills III by his two eldest sons

Henry Overton Wills III (22 December 1828 – 4 September 1911) of Kelston Knoll, near Bath in Somerset, was a prominent and wealthy member of the Bristol tobacco manufacturing family of Wills which founded the firm of W. D. & H. O. Wills. As a philanthropist his best-known act was the funding of the University of Bristol, founded in 1909, of which he became the first Chancellor.

== Origins ==
He was the eldest of the 18 children of Henry Overton Wills II (1800–1871) by his first wife Isabella Board. He was a first cousin of William Henry Wills, 1st Baron Winterstoke, the first Chairman of Imperial Tobacco, formed by the merger of the family's original business with twelve other tobacco firms. He was the elder brother of Sir Edward Payson Wills, 1st Baronet (1834–1910) of Hazelwood and Clapton-in-Gordano and of Sir Frederick Wills, 1st Baronet (1838–1909) of Northmoor (father of Gilbert Wills, 1st Baron Dulverton). His younger half-brother was Sir Frank William Wills, Knight, Lord Mayor of Bristol.

== Career ==
Wills entered the family firm of W. D. & H. O. Wills in 1846, but retired from active association with the business in 1880, due to poor health. When the formation of Imperial Tobacco greatly increased the family’s wealth, various members began to contribute significant amounts of money to local causes. The most significant of these was announced in 1908 by his eldest son Sir George Alfred Wills, 1st Baronet (1854–1928), when he read a letter from his father promising £100,000 (about £10 million in today's money) to fund a university at Bristol if a royal charter for the purpose could be obtained within two years. With the charter and further funding quickly obtained, the University of Bristol was founded in 1909 with Henry as its first Chancellor.

== Marriage and children ==
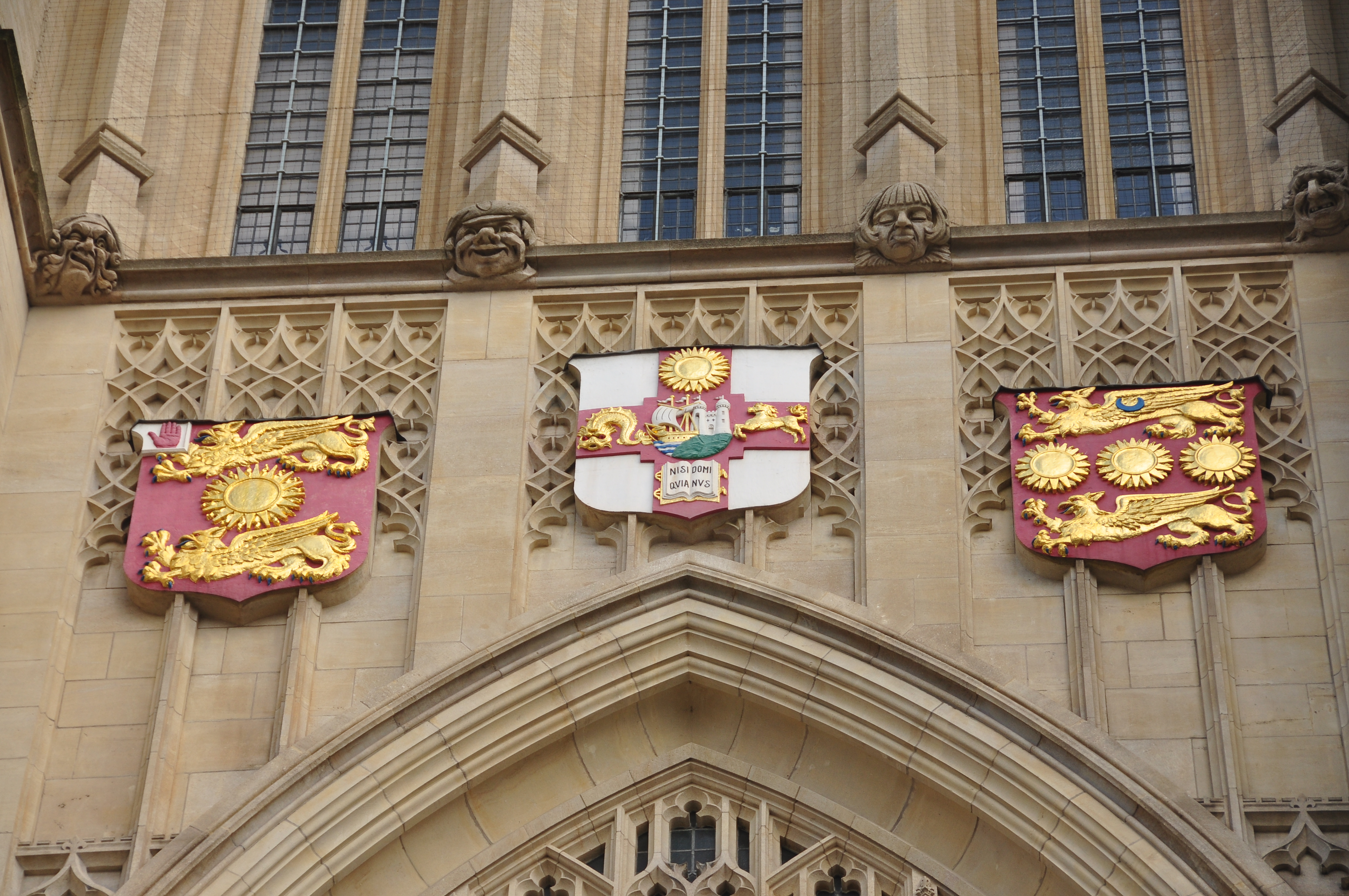
Coats of arms on the Wills Memorial Building, built by the eldest two sons of Henry Overton Wills III: centre: arms of the University of Bristol; left: arms of Sir George Alfred Wills, 1st Baronet, with a canton of a baronet (the Red Hand of Ulster); right: arms of Henry Herbert Wills, with a crescent for the difference of a second son

In 1853 at Plymouth in Devon he married Alice Hopkinson (1827–1881), by whom he had issue including:

- Sir George Alfred Wills, 1st Baronet (1854–1928), eldest son and heir, of Combe Lodge, Blagdon, Somerset, and of Burwalls, Leigh Woods, Long Ashton, Somerset. He served as managing director and later as president of Imperial Tobacco. He donated about £135,000 for the creation of a hall of residence at Bristol University and in 1923 was created a Baronet "of Blagdon". Together with his brother Henry Herbert Wills he built the Wills Memorial Building in Bristol in memory of his father.
- Henry Herbert Wills (1856–1922), 2nd son, also active in the family tobacco firm of WD & HO Wills, of which he was a managing director, and subsequently of the Imperial Tobacco and British-American Tobacco companies;
- Walter Melville Wills, 3rd son, also involved with the family tobacco business and Imperial Tobacco.
- Arthur Stanley Wills (1862–1935), 4th son;
- Maitland Wills (died April 1885), killed by a fall in North Wales;
- H.O. Wills IV (died October 1899), youngest son.

== Death and burial ==
He died on 4 September 1911 at Kelston Knoll and was buried in Arnos Vale Cemetery in Bristol, where survives his monument, together with many others of the Wills family. His estate was valued at £5,214,821, about £520 million in today's money.

== Legacy ==
The Wills Memorial Building, one of the landmark buildings of Bristol University, was built in Henry's honour by his sons George and Harry. One of the Wills' family homes, Downside House in Bristol, is now a hall of residence known as Wills Hall for the university.

=== Professorship of Mathematics ===
The Henry Overton Wills Professorship of Mathematics is a named chair at the University of Bristol. They are, or have been:

- 1919–1949: Henry Ronald Hassé
- 1949–1964: Hans Arnold Heilbronn, FRS
- 1964–1976: Leslie Howarth, FRS
- 1977–1991: John Cedric Shepherdson, FBA
- 1991–1999: Philip Drazin
- 1999–2003: Bernard Walter Silverman, FRS
- 2003–2011: Peter James Green, FRS
- 2012–2019: Jonathan Peter Keating, FRS
- 2024-: Jens Marklof, FRS

== Arms ==
Coat of arms of Henry Overton Wills III
Crest Issuant From An Annulet Or, A Demi Gryphon Gules Charged With A Sun In Splendour And Holding In The Dexter Claw A Battleaxe, Also Or. Escutcheon Gules, three suns in splendour fessewise between two gryphons passant all or. Motto PRO ARIS ET FOCIS

Academic offices
Preceded by (none)	Chancellor of the University of Bristol; 1909–1911	Succeeded by The Viscount Haldane
