= Edward Willes (1723–1787) =

English barrister, politician and judge

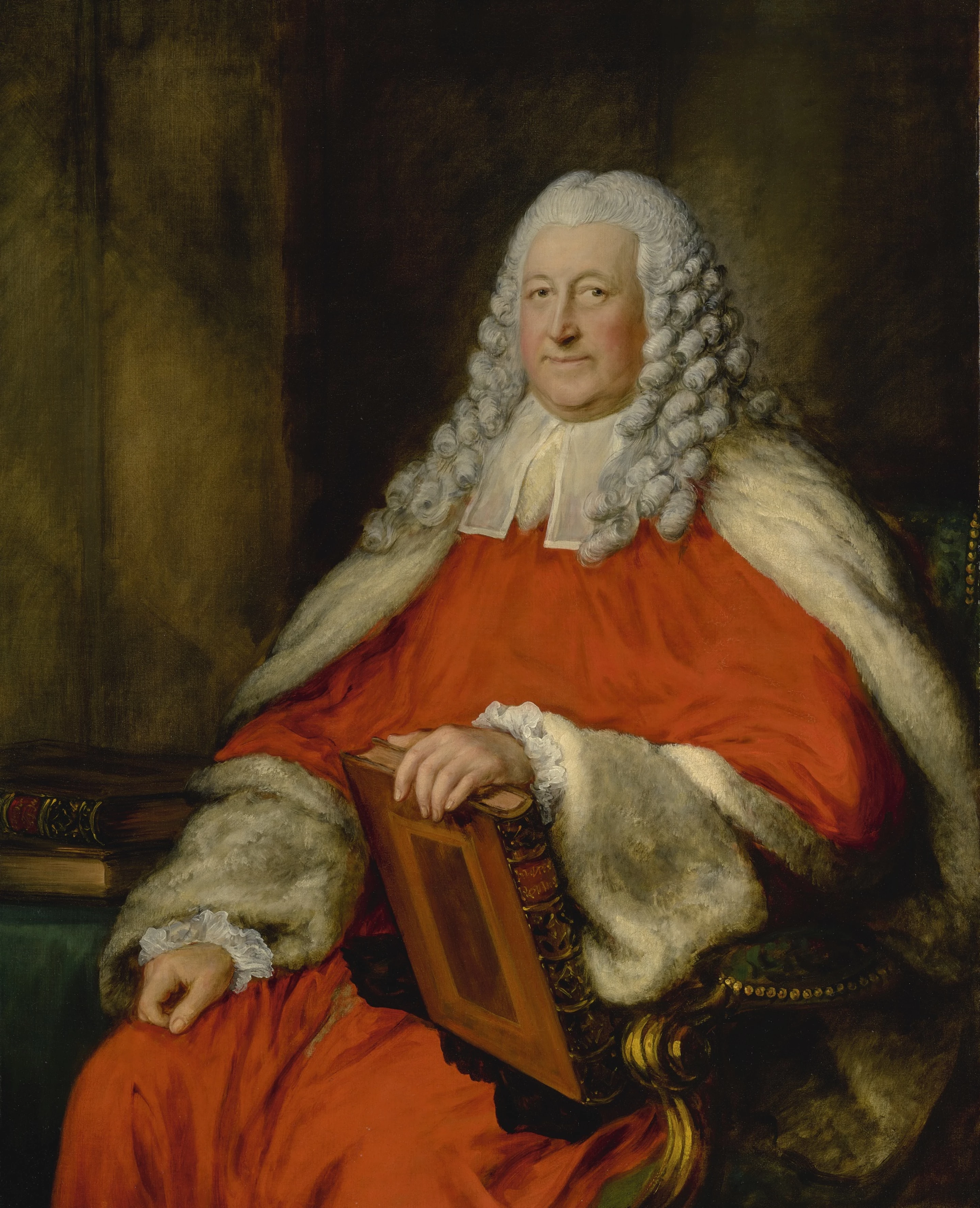
Edward Willes (1723-1787), painting by Thomas Gainsborough

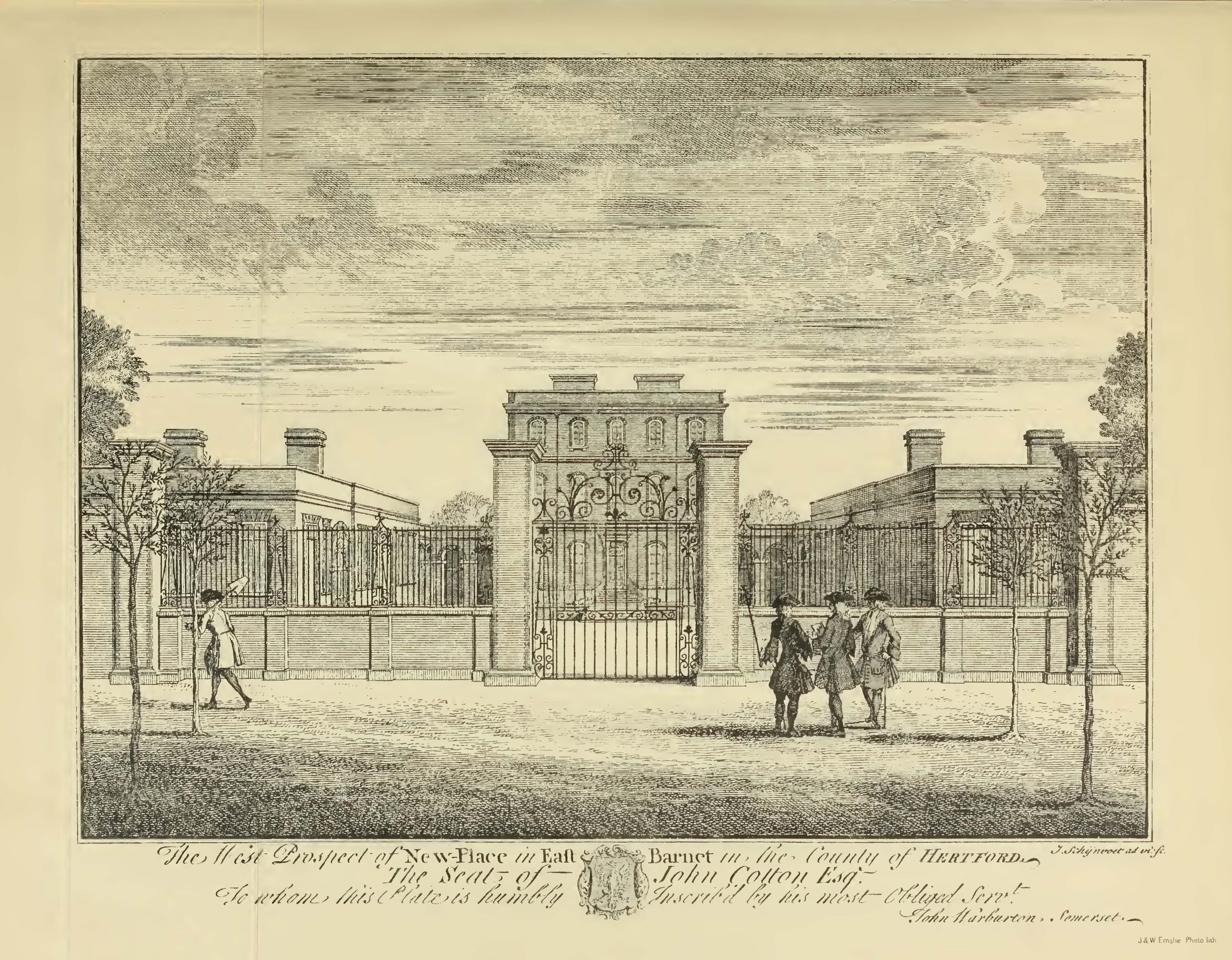
The West Prospect of New-Place in East Barnet in the County of Hertford. A view of the house more generally known as Little Grove in East Barnet that Willes purchased in 1767.

Edward Willes (6 November 1723 – 14 January 1787) was an English barrister, politician, and judge.

== Early life and family ==
Willes was the second surviving son of Sir John Willes, the Chief Justice of the Common Pleas, and his wife Margaret Brewster. He was the younger brother of John Willes MP. Edward Willes (1702-1768), Chief Baron of the Irish Exchequer, was his second cousin.

Willes was educated at Worcester College, Oxford and at Lincoln's Inn where he was called to the bar in 1747, and became a bencher in 1757.

In 1752, he married Anne, the daughter of Rev. Edward Taylor of Sutton, Wiltshire. They had 3 sons.

== Little Grove ==
In 1767, Willes purchased Little Grove (now demolished) in East Barnet, the house built for John Cotton of the Middle Temple in 1719. He commissioned Capability Brown to design the gardens.

== Career ==
Willes became a King's Counsel in 1756, served as Solicitor General for England and Wales from 1766 to 1768, and then became a justice of the Court of King's Bench from 1768 until his death in 1787, aged 63.

He was a member of parliament (MP) for Old Sarum in 1747, for Aylesbury from 1747 to 1754, and for Leominster from 1767 to 1768.

Parliament of Great Britain
Preceded by James Grenville; William Pitt	Member of Parliament for Old Sarum; May 1747 – July 1747; With: William Pitt	Succeeded by Thomas Pitt of Boconnoc; Sir William Irby, Bt
Preceded by Viscount Petersham; Charles Pilsworth	Member of Parliament for Aylesbury; 1747–1754; With: The Earl of Inchiquin	Succeeded by Thomas Potter; John Willes
Preceded by Chase Price; Jenison Shafto	Member of Parliament for Leominster; 1767 – Feb 1768; With: Jenison Shafto	Succeeded by Jenison Shafto; John Carnac
Political offices
Preceded by William de Grey	Solicitor-General; 1766–1768	Succeeded by John Dunning
