= Wills Memorial Building =

Neo-Gothic building in Bristol, England

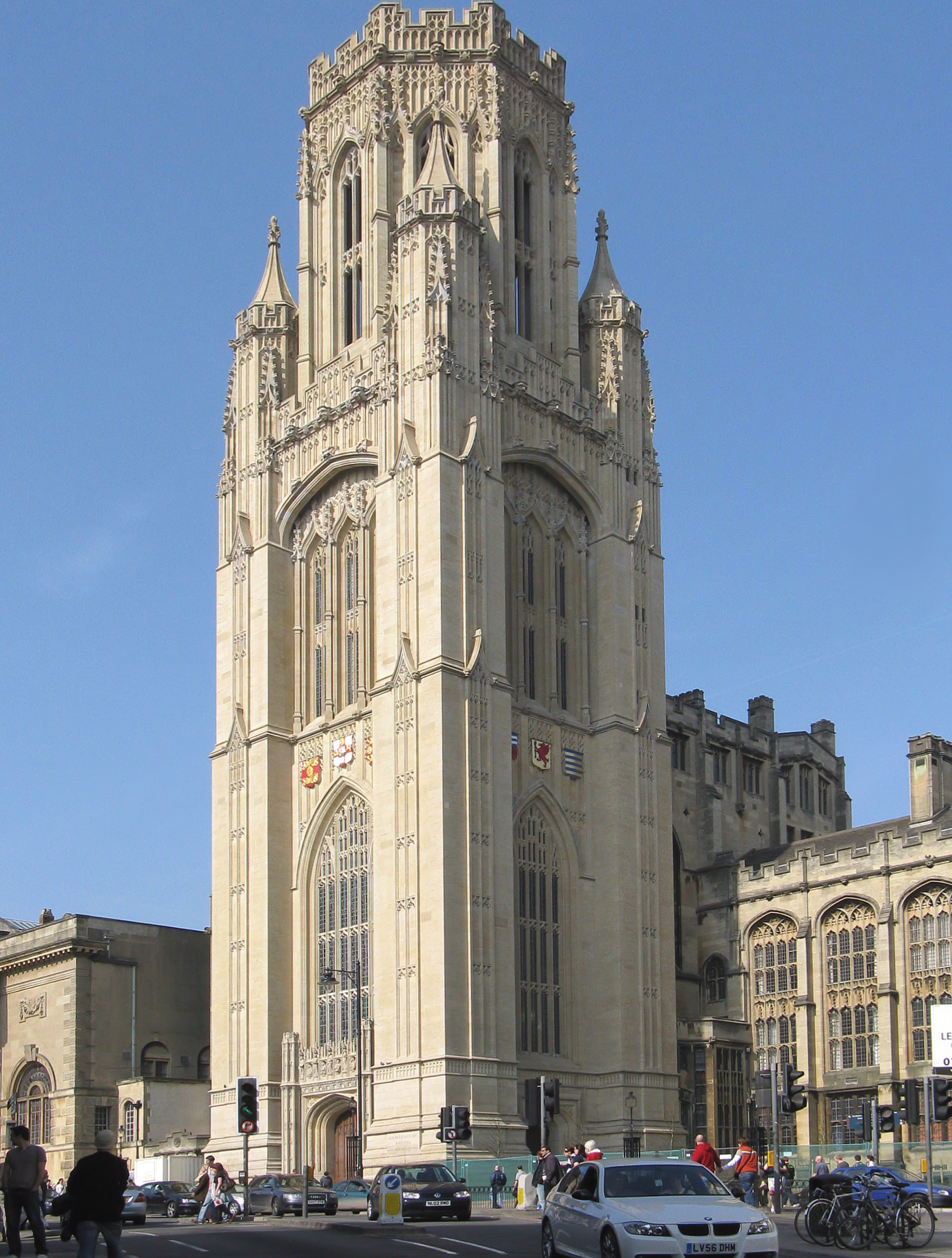
- Wills Memorial Building in 2009

- Location within Bristol

General information
- Architectural style: Perpendicular Gothic, Gothic Revival
- Location: Bristol, England
- Coordinates: 51°27′22″N 2°36′16″W
- Construction started: 1915
- Completed: 1925
- Cost: £501,566 19s 10d
- Client: W. D. & H. O. Wills

Height
- Height: 215 ft (65.5 m)

Design and construction
- Architect: Sir George Oatley

Listed Building – Grade II*
- Official name: University Tower and Wills Memorial Building and attached front walls and lamps
- Designated: 1 November 1966
- Reference no.: 1218203

The Wills Memorial Building (also known as the Wills Memorial Tower or simply the Wills Tower) is a neo-Gothic building in Bristol, England, designed by Sir George Oatley and built as a memorial to Henry Overton Wills III by his sons George and Henry Wills. Begun in 1915 and not opened until 1925, it is considered one of the last great Gothic buildings to be built in England.

Standing near the top of Park Street on Queens Road, it is a landmark building of the University of Bristol that currently houses the School of Law and the Department of Earth Sciences, as well as the Law and Earth Sciences libraries. As of 2025 it is the seventh-tallest structure in Bristol, standing at 215 feet (65.5 m).

Many regard the building as synonymous with the University of Bristol. It is the centrepiece building of the university precinct and is used by the university for degree ceremonies and examinations, which take place in the Great Hall.

Architecture commentator Nikolaus Pevsner described it as:

"a tour de force in Gothic Revival, so convinced, so vast, and so competent that one cannot help feeling respect for it."

It has been designated by English Heritage as a Grade II* listed building and serves as a regional European Documentation Centre.

== History ==
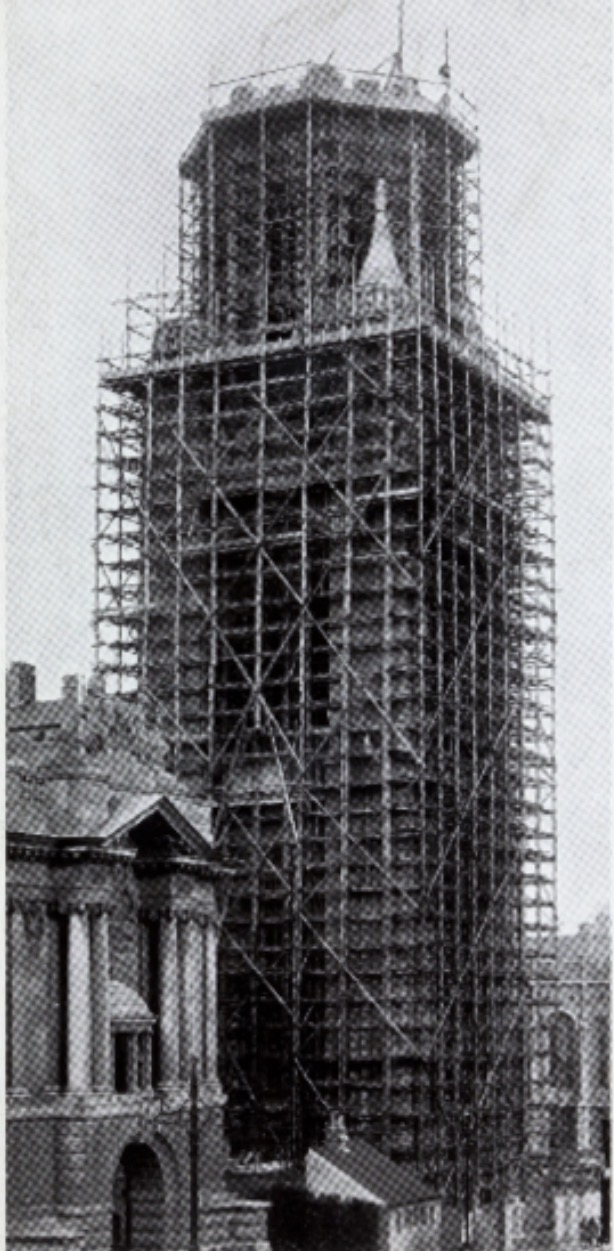
Construction of the Wills Memorial Building

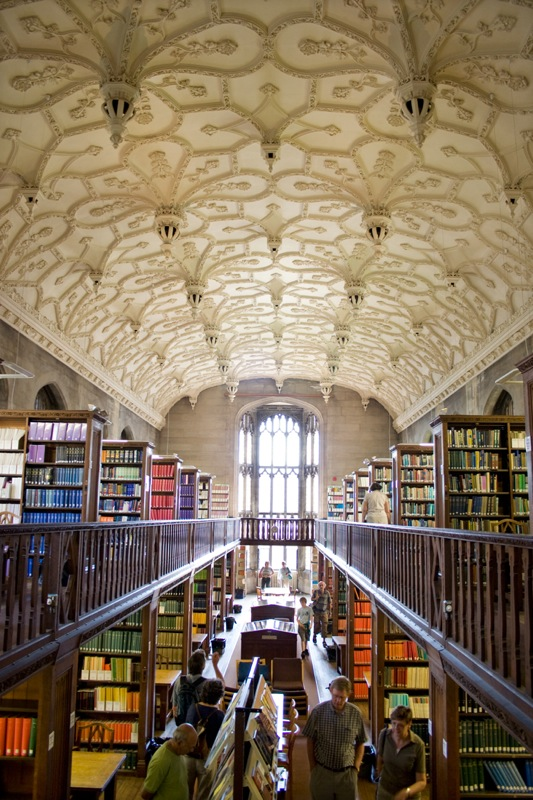
The Wills Memorial Geology Library

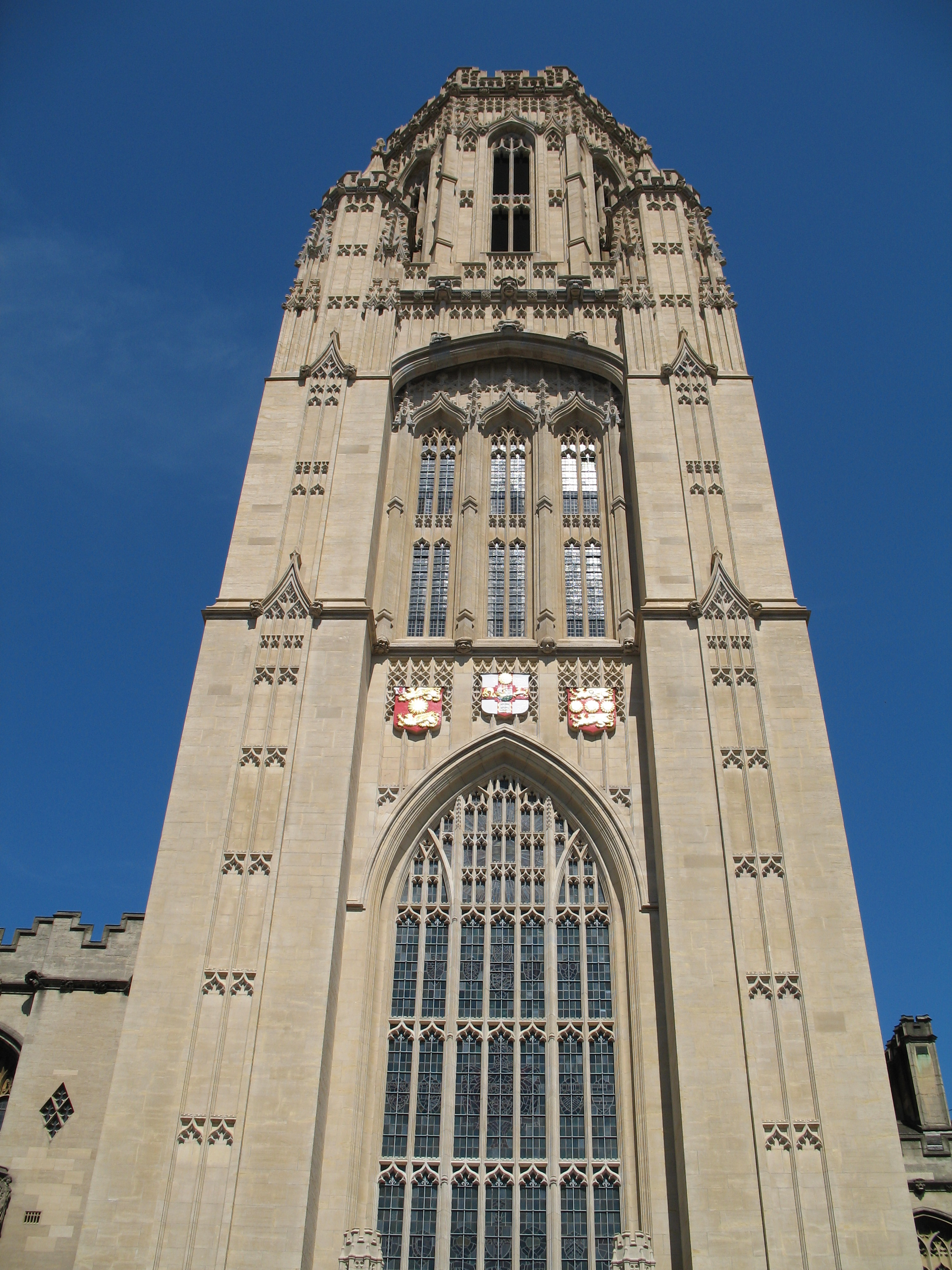
Wills Memorial Building, front face

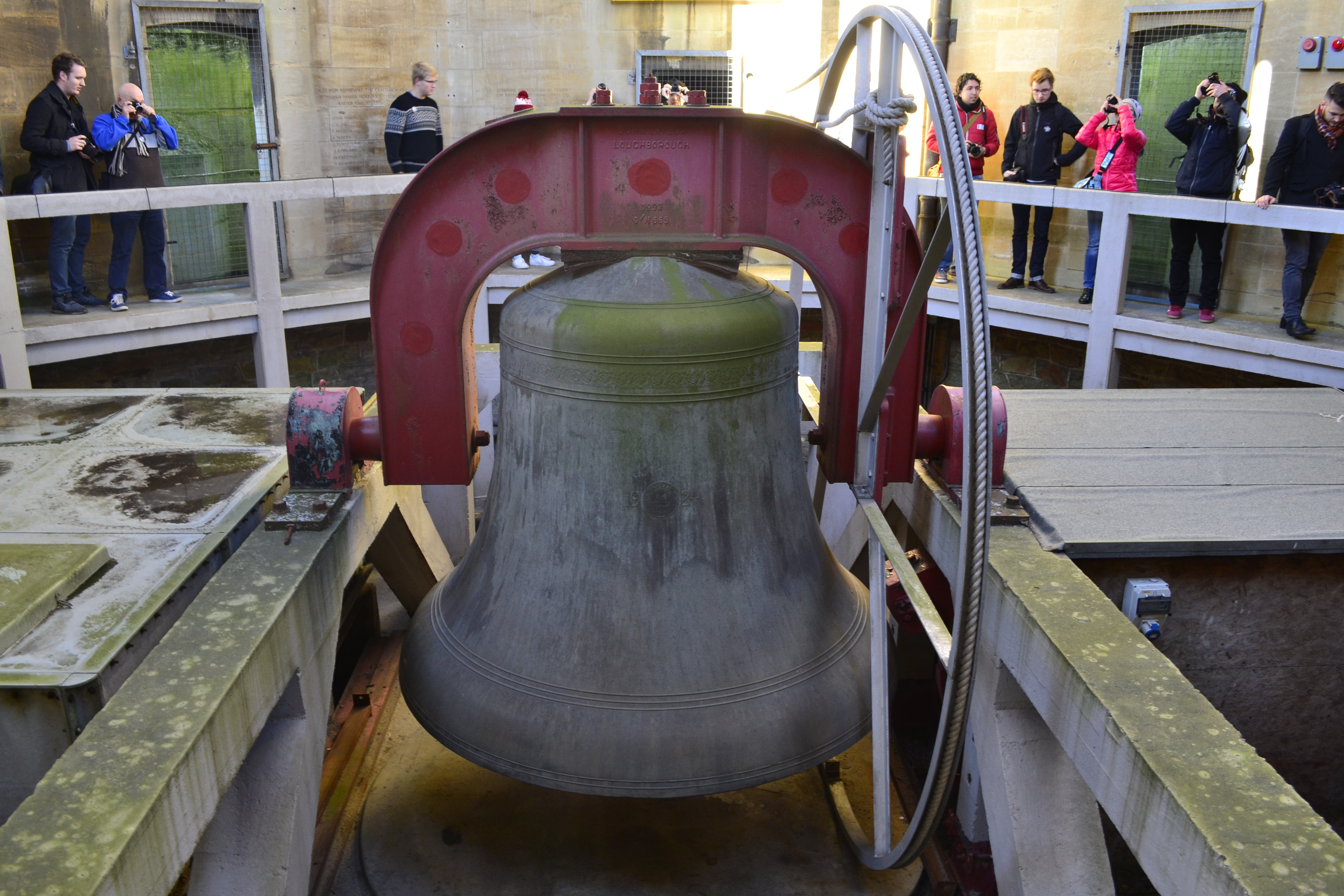
Great George in the tower of the Wills Memorial Building

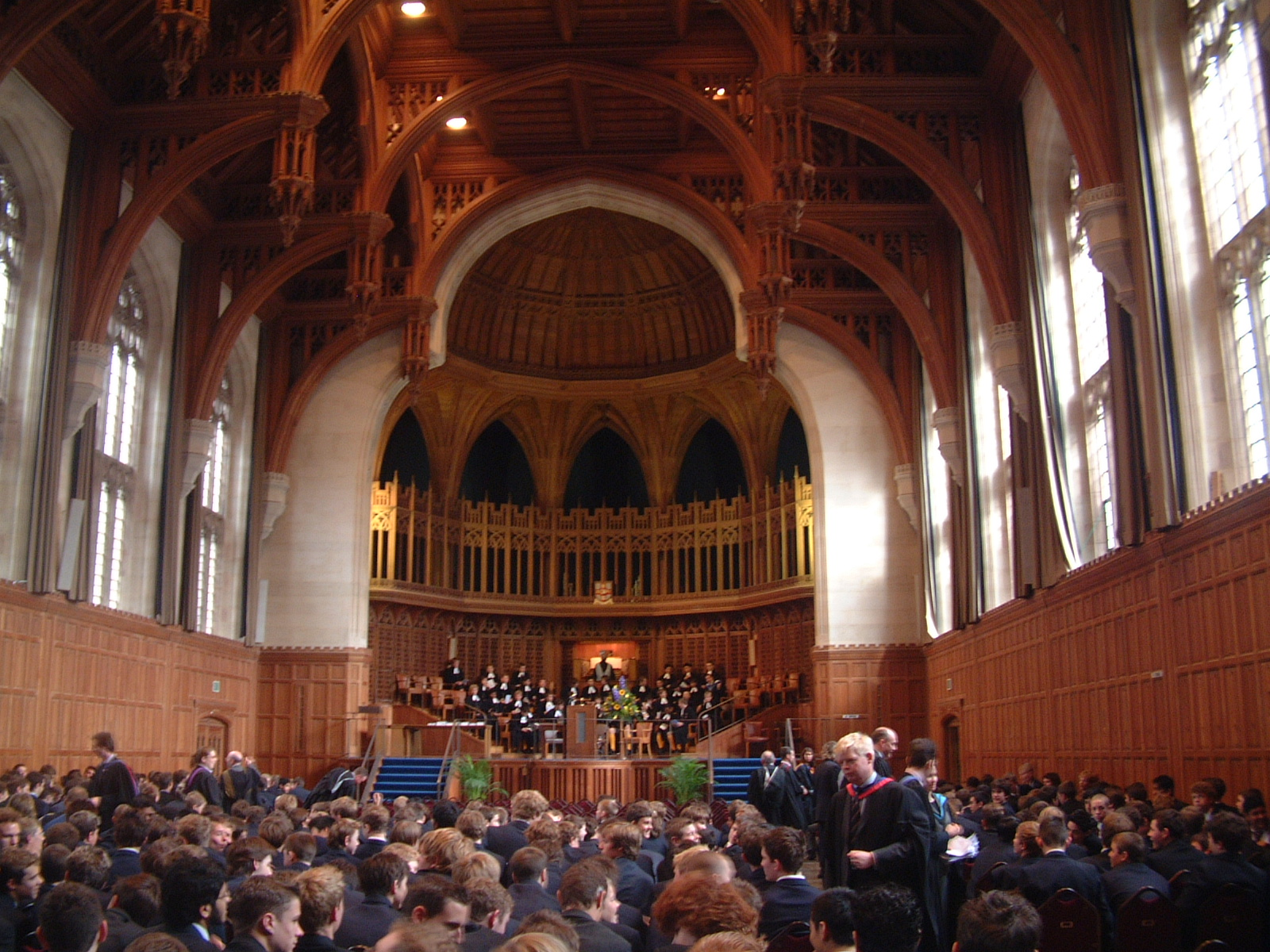
Wills Memorial Building interior

The Wills Memorial Building was commissioned in 1912 by George Alfred Wills and Henry Herbert Wills, the magnates of the Bristol tobacco company W. D. & H. O. Wills, in honour of their father, Henry Overton Wills III, benefactor and first Chancellor of the university who donated £100,000 to the university. Sir George Oatley, who also worked on a number of other buildings for the university, was chosen as architect and told to "build to last". He produced a design in the Perpendicular Gothic style, to evoke the famous university buildings of Oxford and Cambridge. The building was funded through the fortunes which the Wills family made through tobacco. Oatley later claimed that his inspiration for the building came from a dream where he saw a tower on a hill, with shields around it.

Construction started in 1915 but was halted in 1916 due to the continuation of the First World War. Work resumed in 1919, and the Wills Memorial Building was finally opened on 9 June 1925 by King George V and Queen Mary, having cost a total of £501,566 19s 10d. The building was opened with a Royal Salute of 21 chimes from 'Great George', the nine-and-a-half ton bell within the octagonal belfry of the tower, which is tolled on the death of a monarch or chancellor. Oatley received a knighthood that year in recognition of his work on the building.

In 1940 during the Bristol Blitz of the Second World War, the Great Hall with its hammerbeam roof was badly damaged by a German bomb-blast. It was restored in the 1960s to Oatley's original design; at the same time the adjoining wing was enlarged by Ralph Brentnall.

=== 21st-century controversy ===
The alleged connection of the Wills family to historical slavery via the U.S. tobacco industry attracted controversy in the 2010s, with some students petitioning the University of Bristol to rename the building in March 2017. In 2018 the university published a response and consultation on how to address the issue, including (amongst others) the suggestion of renaming university buildings and changing the coat of arms.

On 28 February 2022, the Great Hall of the Wills Memorial Building was occupied by a group of students. The student occupiers barricaded themselves inside in solidarity with ongoing industrial action by the University and Colleges Union which represents many teaching and professional services staff at the university.

== Description ==
The building's dominant feature is the Wills Tower, built in reinforced concrete faced with Bath and Clipsham stone, with carving designed in collaboration with Jean Hahn of King's Heath Guild, Birmingham. At 215 ft (65.5 m) tall it is over twice the height of the nearby Cabot Tower. It is 16 metres (52 ft) square and ornamented with heraldic shields. It is topped by an octagonal lantern which houses Great George (England's ninth-largest bell, weighing over 9.5 tonnes) which strikes on the hour.

In addition to the Great Hall there is a general library, reception room and council chamber, and a further 50 rooms including some teaching space such as seminar rooms and lecture theatres. In the entrance hall are two ceremonial staircases. The building is also used as a conference venue.

== Restoration ==
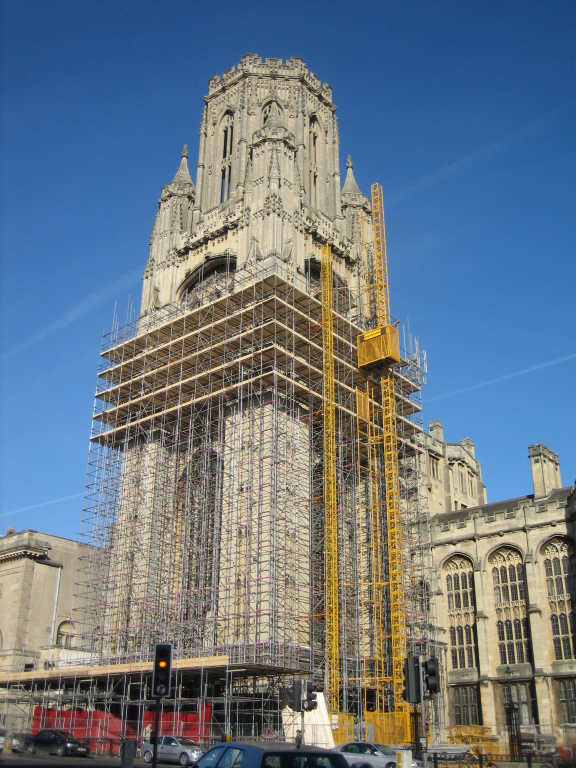
Restoration work in 2006

In 2006 cleaning work began on the Wills Memorial Building costing £750,000. Cleaning on the building revealed the engraving "IO TRIVMPHE" intended as a tribute to the architect of the building Sir George Oatley. The engraving had remained hidden for over 80 years and recognises the role of Sir Isambard Owen (then Vice-Chancellor) in the realisation of Oatley's plans. Harry Patch, a veteran of the First World War who also worked on the building, re-unveiled the now clean building.

== See also ==
- Grade II* listed buildings in Bristol
- List of tallest buildings and structures in Bristol
