= Wills =

Wills may refer to:

- Will (law), a legal document

== Places ==
=== Australia ===
- Wills, Queensland, a locality in the Shire of Boulia
- Division of Wills, an Australian electoral division in Victoria

=== United States ===
- Wills Township, LaPorte County, Indiana
- Wills Township, Guernsey County, Ohio
- Wills, Wisconsin, an unincorporated community
- Wills Creek (Ohio), a tributary of the Muskingum River
- Wills Creek (North Branch Potomac River), in Pennsylvania and Maryland

== People ==
- Wills (surname), a surname
- William, Prince of Wales (born 1982), nicknamed "Wills"

== Other uses ==
- Wills baronets, of Northmoor, a former title in the Peerage of the United Kingdom - see Baron Dulverton
- Wills Hall, a student residence of the University of Bristol
- Wills Navy Cut or simply Wills, a popular cigarette brand in India

== See also ==
- Will (disambiguation)
