= George Alfred Wills =

British businessman

Sir George Alfred Wills, 1st Baronet of Blagdon (3 June 1854 – 11 July 1928) was the Chairman, then first President, of Imperial Tobacco and a prominent member of an eminent Bristol family.

He was the son of Henry Overton Wills III and Alice Hopkinson and was educated at Mill Hill School before joining his father’s business, WD & HO Wills; he eventually became its managing director. In 1901, along with his brother, Henry Herbert Wills, he was a major actor in the establishment of the Imperial Tobacco Company of Great Britain and Ireland.

Both brothers campaigned, and provided substantial financial support, for the building of the Bristol University's Wills Memorial Building, which was dedicated to the memory of his father, Henry Overton Wills III. He also gave £110,000 and £25,000 for the construction of a hall of residence for students at the university.

Many of the boarding houses at Mill Hill School are located on Wills Grove, named after George Alfred Wills.

George Alfred Wills was created a Baronet in 1923 Birthday Honours.

Walter Melville Wills, another brother, was also involved with the family's tobacco business and, subsequently, a manager at Imperial Tobacco.

Wills was a nephew of Sir Edward Payson Wills Bt, Sir Frederick Wills Bt, & Sir Frank William Wills Kt, and also a cousin of Gilbert Wills, 1st Baron Dulverton, & Sir Ernest Wills, 3rd Baronet of Hazelwood.

Seats - Combe Lodge, Blagdon, Somerset, & Burwalls, Leigh Woods, Long Ashton, Somerset.

Baronetage of the United Kingdom
New creation	Baronet (of Blagdon); 1923–1928	Succeeded by George Wills
