= John Willes (1721–1784) =

English politician

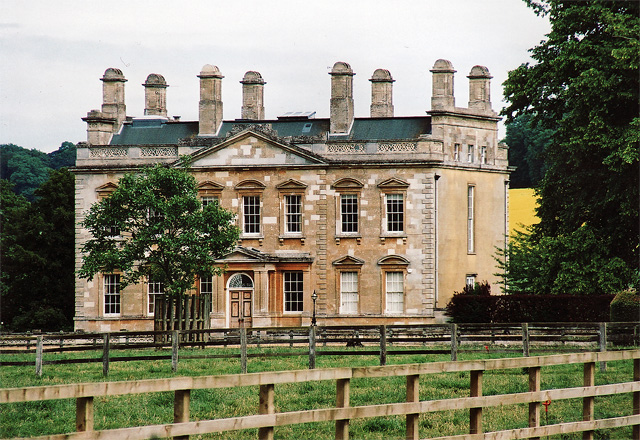
Astrop Park house

Sir John Willes (c. 1721 – 24 November 1784) was an English politician.

He was the eldest son of John Willes, Chief Justice of the Common Pleas, and his wife Margaret Brewster. Edward Willes, judge of the Court of King's Bench, was his younger brother. He was educated at Worcester College, Oxford (1738) and studied law at Lincoln's Inn (1734). He succeeded his father to Astrop Park near Banbury in 1761.

He was member of parliament (MP) for Banbury 1746–1754, and for Aylesbury 1754–1761.

He died in 1784. In 1754 he had married Frances, the daughter and heiress of Thomas Freke, a Bristol merchant. They had one son and three daughters.

His daughter margaret married Sir George Beaumont, 7th Baronet

Parliament of Great Britain
Preceded by William Moore	Member of Parliament for Banbury; 1746–1754	Succeeded by Lord North
Preceded by Edward Willes; The Earl of Inchiquin	Member of Parliament for Aylesbury; 1754–1761; With: Thomas Potter 1754–1757; John Wilkes 1757–1761	Succeeded by Welbore Ellis; John Wilkes
