= Henry Herbert Wills =

British businessman

Henry Herbert 'Harry' Wills (20 March 1856 – 11 May 1922) was a businessman and philanthropist from Bristol, and a member of the Wills tobacco family.

He was the son of Henry Overton Wills III and Alice Hopkinson and was born in Clifton, Bristol. He was educated at Clifton College. He was a member of the board for the Imperial Tobacco Company.

His name is particularly associated with Bristol University. He was responsible for meeting the funding needed to build Wills Hall, a hall of residence for Bristol University students. He also funded the building of the H. H. Wills Physics Laboratory situated in Royal Fort Gardens. With his brother Sir George Alfred Wills Bt, he was responsible for the building of the Wills Memorial Building, a landmark building of Bristol University, in memory of his father.

He was appointed High Sheriff of Somerset for 1910.

Residence - Barley Wood, Wrington, Somerset.

== Family ==
He was married to Dame Monica Cunliffe Wills, but the union was apparently childless. However, one of his nephews, Walter Douglas Melville Wills, of Barley Wood (named in Burke's Landed Gentry), bought Barley Wood from his said uncle, thus continuing the family ownership.

Henry was a nephew of Sir Edward Payson Wills Bt, Sir Frederick Wills Bt, & Sir Frank William Wills Kt, and a cousin of Gilbert Wills, 1st Baron Dulverton, & Sir Ernest Salter Wills, 3rd Baronet of Hazelwood.

One of his brothers, Walter Melville Wills, was also involved with the Wills tobacco family business.

== Archives ==
Documents relating to H.H. Wills are held at Bristol Archives (Ref. 43050). Bristol Record Office also holds records of H.H. Wills' family business, W.D. & H.O. Wills (Ref. 38169). Records of Imperial Tobacco are held by Liverpool Record Office.
