= Edward Willes (1702–1768) =

English judge and Chief Baron of the Irish Exchequer

Edward Willes (1702 – June 1768) was an English-born judge in eighteenth-century Ireland, who became Chief Baron of the Irish Exchequer.

== Family ==
He was the elder son of Dr. Edward Willes, who was the younger son of Peter Willes, and was born on the Willes family estate at Newbold Comyn, near Leamington. He married Mary Denny of Norfolk and had three children, two sons and a daughter. Sir John Willes, the long-serving Chief Justice of the Common Pleas, was his second cousin and encouraged him in his choice of a legal career. Sir John Willes was the father of another Sir Edward Willes who was Solicitor-General and judge of the Court of King's Bench.

== Career ==
He was called to the Bar in 1727, became a serjeant-at-law in 1740 and King's Serjeant in 1747; subsequently he became Attorney-General for the Duchy of Lancaster and Recorder of Coventry. In 1757 he was sent to Ireland as Chief Baron of the Exchequer, no doubt partly through his cousin Sir John's influence.

He acquired a reputation as an exceptionally hard-working and conscientious judge, who damaged his health by overwork. He was also an acute and intelligent observer of Irish life, recording his impressions of social and economic conditions and of the Irish legal system in a series of unpublished manuscripts, and also in his letters to Francis Greville, 1st Earl of Warwick, which have been published. He was particularly concerned by the perennial difficulty of finding enough judges to go on assize, and was unhappy at the usual remedy of appointing the Serjeants-at-law and Law Officers as temporary judges. In his view, these men lacked judicial independence and did not have the political standing to challenge powerful local interests.

He also observed that Irish barristers generally earned significantly less than their English counterparts, even though they often charged higher fees. This he believed was due partly due to the number of barristers who went on circuit, even though there was not enough work on the circuits to go round, and partly because solicitors then argued most of the preliminary motions in a civil trial themselves, thus depriving the Irish Bar of a major source of income.

Willes's health soon began to fail, almost certainly due to overwork; in 1766 he retired to England. He died at Newbold Comyn in 1768.

== Character ==
Elrington Ball praises Willes as a good lawyer, and as a man who was honest, highly intelligent, a natural scholar and a much-loved figure in private life . Hart gives a similar verdict, stating that Willes was an intelligent and sensitive man and an acute observer of Irish society and politics.

Despite his many good qualities he has been judged harshly for his severity towards Roman Catholics and his determination to resist any relaxation of the Penal laws. It must be said that this attitude was fully shared by several of his colleagues on the Irish bench, notably the Lord Chancellor of Ireland, John, Lord Bowes, who made the notorious remark that "the law did not admit that a single Roman Catholic existed in Ireland". Willes wrote to the Lord Lieutenant of Ireland, the 4th Duke of Bedford, who favoured relaxation of the Penal Laws, that he was opposed to any "toleration of that religion which it has been the general policy of England and of Ireland to persecute and depress. "

== Sir Edward Willes (1723–1787) ==
The Chief Baron should not be confused with his cousin Sir Edward Willes, son of Sir John Willes. The younger Edward was a member of the House of Commons successively for Old Sarum, Aylesbury and Leominster. He became Solicitor-General in 1766; two years later he was appointed a judge of the Court of King's Bench and held that office until his death in January 1787.
