= Beryl May Dent =

English mathematical physicist (1900–1977)

Beryl May Dent MIEE
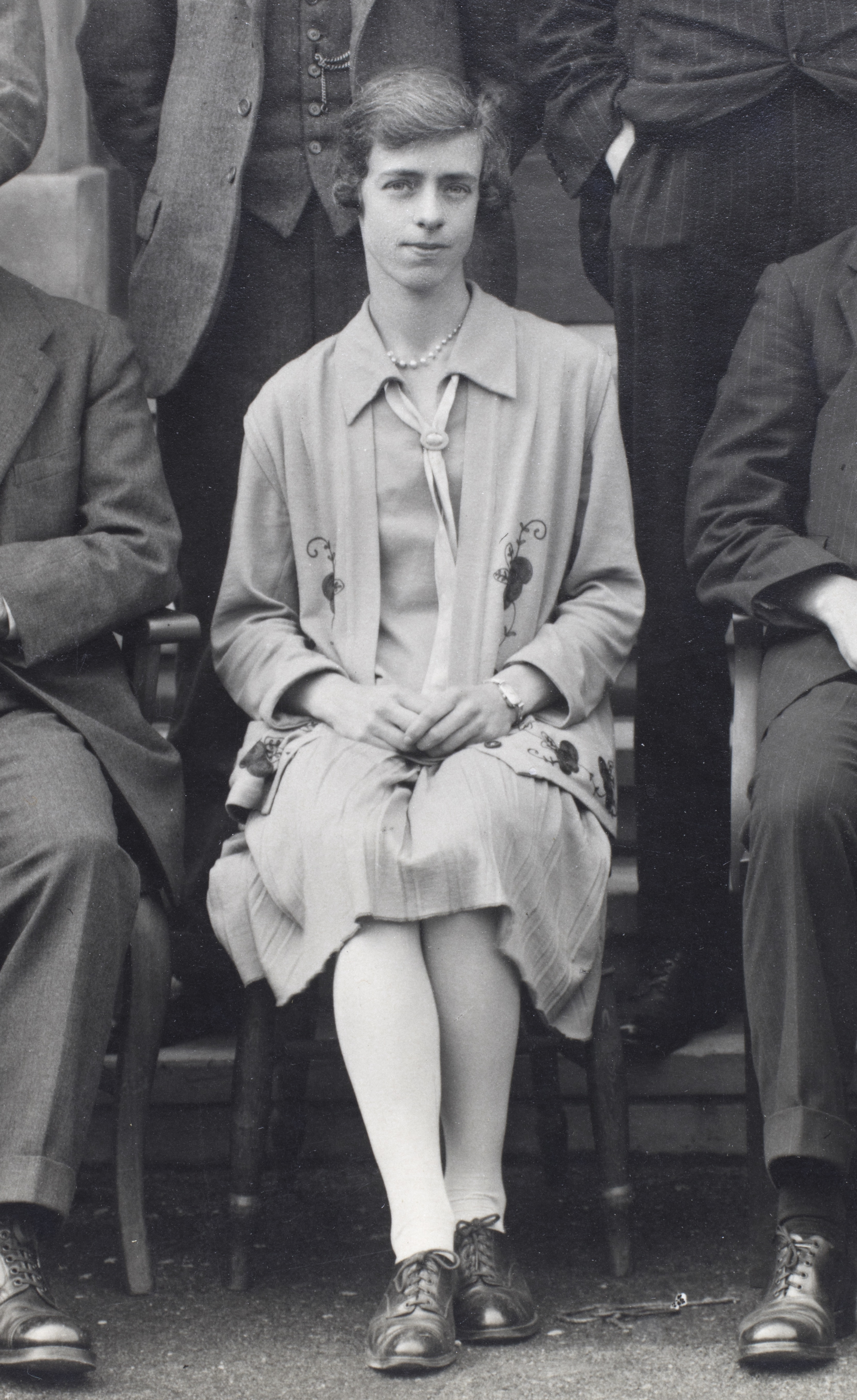
- Dent in 1928
- Born: 10 May 1900; Chippenham, Wiltshire, England
- Died: 9 August 1977 (aged 77); Worthing, West Sussex, England
- Resting place: Worthing Crematorium (ashes interred)
- Education: University of Bristol (MSc, 1927); Newnham College, Cambridge
- Awards: Ashworth Hallett scholarship (1923)
- Scientific career
- Fields: Computer-aided engineering; Molecular physics; Regression analysis; Other fields: Intermolecular forces; Semiconductor materials; Technical library services; Thin films; Valency
- Workplaces: University of Bristol Physics Department; Metropolitan-Vickers Electrical Company Ltd
- Thesis: Some theoretical determinations of crystal structure (1927)
- Academic advisors: John Lennard-Jones

Beryl May Dent MIEE (10 May 1900 – 9 August 1977) was an English mathematical physicist, technical librarian, and a programmer of early analogue and digital computers to solve electrical engineering problems. She was born in Chippenham, Wiltshire, the eldest daughter of schoolteachers. The family left Chippenham in 1901, after her father became head teacher of the then recently established Warminster County School. In 1923, she graduated from the University of Bristol with First Class Honours in applied mathematics. She was awarded the Ashworth Hallett scholarship by the university and was accepted as a postgraduate student at Newnham College, Cambridge.

She returned to Bristol in 1925, after being appointed a researcher in the Physics Department at the University of Bristol, with her salary being paid by the Department of Scientific and Industrial Research. In 1927, John Lennard-Jones was appointed Professor of Theoretical physics, a chair being created for him, with Dent becoming his research assistant in theoretical physics. Lennard‑Jones pioneered the theory of interatomic and intermolecular forces at Bristol and she became one of his first collaborators. They published six papers together from 1926 to 1928, dealing with the forces between atoms and ions, that were to become the foundation of her master's thesis. Later work has shown that the results they obtained had direct application to atomic force microscopy by predicting that non-contact imaging is possible only at small tip-sample separations.

In 1930, she joined Metropolitan-Vickers Electrical Company Ltd, Manchester, as a technical librarian for the scientific and technical staff of the research department. She became active in the Association of Special Libraries and Information Bureaux (ASLIB) and was honorary secretary to the founding committee for the Lancashire and Cheshire branch of the association. She served on various ASLIB committees and made conference presentations detailing different aspects of the company's library and information service. She continued to publish scientific papers, contributing numerical methods for solving differential equations by the use of the differential analyser that was built for the University of Manchester and Douglas Hartree. She was the first to develop a detailed reduced major axis method for the best fit of a series of data points.

Later in her career she became leader of the computation section at Metropolitan-Vickers, and then a supervisor in the research department for the section that was investigating semiconducting materials. She joined the Women's Engineering Society and published papers on the application of digital computers to electrical design. She retired in 1960, with Isabel Hardwich, later a fellow and president of the Women's Engineering Society, replacing her as section leader for the women in the research department. In 1962, she moved with her mother and sister to Sompting, West Sussex, and died there in 1977.

== Early life ==
Dent's father, Eustace Edward, photographed at Warminster County School in 1926

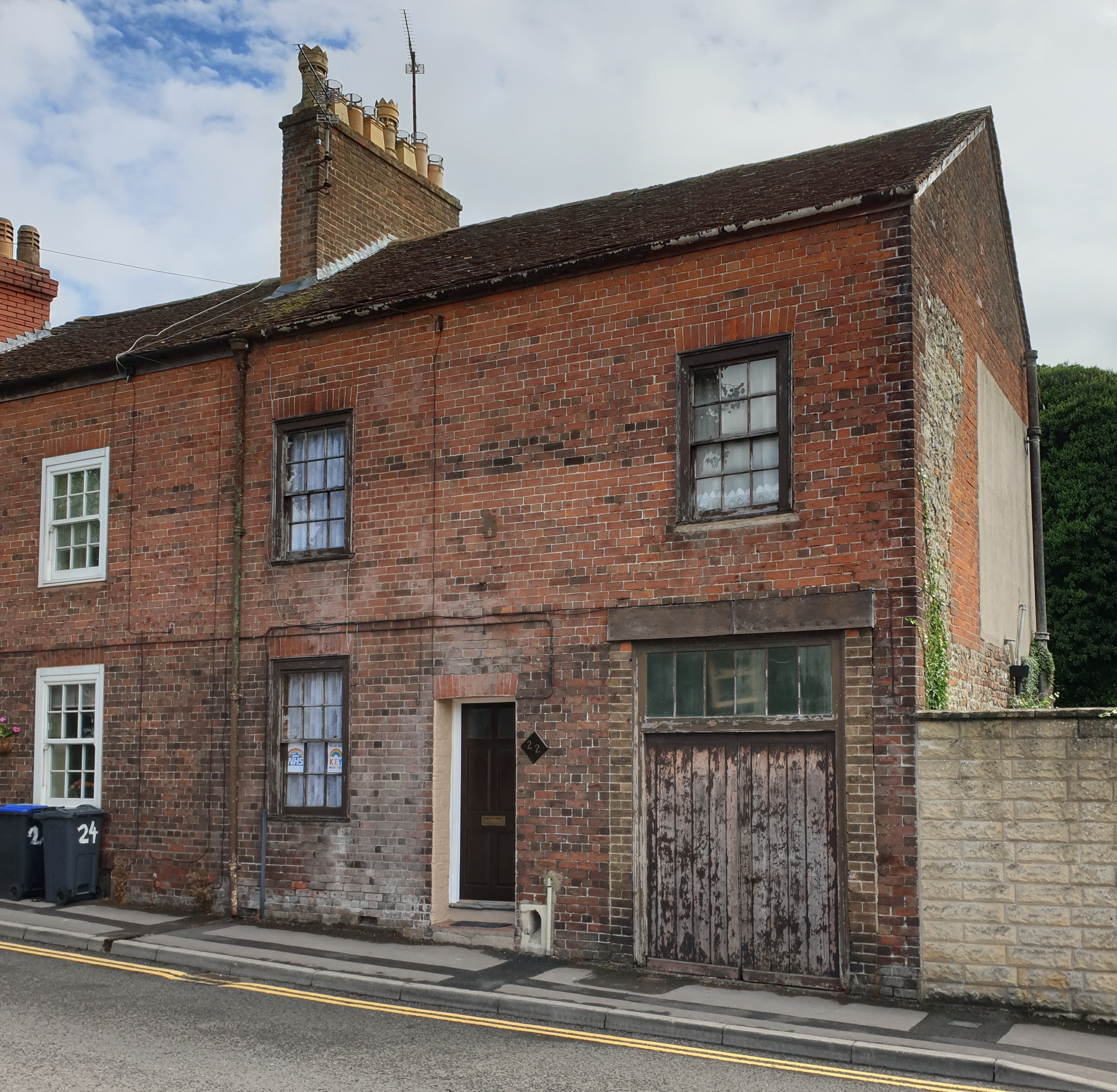
The family lived at Boreham Road before moving in 1907 to 22 Portway, Warminster

Beryl May was born on 10 May 1900, at Penley Villa, Park Lane, Chippenham, Wiltshire, the eldest daughter of Agnes Dent (1869–1967), née Thornley, and Eustace Edward (1868–1954). She was baptised at St Paul's, Chippenham, on 8 June 1900. They had married at St Mary's Church, Goosnargh, near Preston, Lancashire, on 27 July 1898. Her mother was educated at the Harris Institute, Preston, passing examinations in science and art. She was a teacher at Attercliffe School, in northeast Sheffield, before moving to Goosnargh School, near her hometown of Preston, where her elder brother and sister, John William and Mary Ann Thornley, were the head teachers. In March 1894, she had applied for the headship at Fairfield School, Cockermouth, making the shortlist, but the board decided to appoint a local candidate.

On 18 March 1889, Dent's father was appointed to a teaching assistant position at Portland Road School, in Halifax, West Yorkshire, after completing a teaching apprenticeship with the school board. In the same year, Florence Emily Dent, his elder sister, was appointed head teacher at West Vale girls' school, Stainland Road, Greetland, moving from the Higher Board School at Halifax. In August 1889, he obtained a first class pass in mathematics from the Halifax Mechanics' Institute. (Note: His siblings took the mathematics examination at the same time.) He enrolled on a degree course at University College, Aberystwyth, in the Education Day Training College. (Note: See The Day Training College: a Victorian innovation in teacher training.) In January 1894, he was awarded a first by Aberystwyth, and a first in the external University of London examinations. (Note: Aberystwyth originated as a college teaching external degrees of the University of London. See University of London Worldwide history of the external examination system.) His first teaching post was at Coopers' Company Grammar School, Bow, London, before moving to Chippenham, where he was a senior assistant teacher at the Chippenham County School.

In October 1901, Dent's father left Chippenham to become head teacher of the then recently established Warminster County School, that adjoined the Athenaeum Theatre in Warminster. (Note: In 1897, the Government Education Inspectors insisted the Athenaeum must expand if it was to continue as a centre of learning. An initial plan to add a floor to the building was rejected in favour of adding a new adjoining building at a cost of £3,000. The new school also made use of the first floor classrooms in the Athenaeum.) The family moved to Boreham Road, Warminster, where houses were built in the early 19th century. (Note: A Warminster town guide of 1924 described Boreham Road as a modern residential quarter of semi-detached villas, pretty gardens, with a tree lined footpath blending the rural with the urban.) In April 1907, they moved to 22 Portway, Warminster, situated a short distance from the County School and the Athenaeum. He was elected chair of the Warminster Urban District Council from 1920 to 1922, (Note: There is a portrait photograph of Eustace, as chair of the council, in the café area of the Civic Centre in Sambourne Road, Warminster.) and remained as head teacher of the County School until his retirement in August 1929. (Note: The school closed at the end of the summer term on 29 July 1931, after the Wiltshire Council Education Authority built a new secondary school for Warminster. The building was used as the town library until 1958, and then by Warminster Youth Centre, but is now owned and managed by the Athenaeum Trust.)

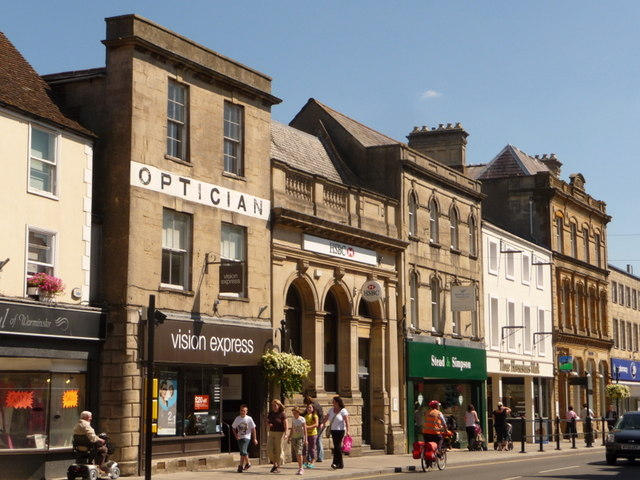
Dent's father was also a regular cast member of the Warminster Operatic Society at the Athenaeum and other venues. Dent and her younger sister, Florence Mary, would often appear with him on stage in such operettas as Snow White and the seven dwarfs and the Princess Ju‑Ju (The Golden Amulet), a Japanese operetta in three acts by Clementine Ward. In Princess Ju‑Ju, she played La La, one of the three maidens attendant on the princess, and sang the first act solo, She must be demure. In act two of the same musical, she performed in the fan dance, Spirits of the Night. (Note: Market Place in Warminster At the end of the musical, the national anthem of Japan was sung, followed by the British national anthem, and the flags of the Allies were waved from the stage. The Belgian flag was held by a young refugee, Alphonse Cambier, who, with three others, were attending the County School. Germany had invaded Belgium on 4 August 1914, forcing Belgians to flee, with the United Kingdom home to 250,000 Belgian refugees during World War I. Lord Bath placed his vacant houses in the district at their disposal. Amongst others, two large houses in Warminster were made available, one in the Market Place, and one in Silver Street.) She also acted in a scene from Tennyson's Princess at the County School's prize giving day on 16 December 1913. (Note: A scene from Princess Ida, the comic opera adaptation by Gilbert and Sullivan.)

== Education ==
=== Warminster County School (1909–1917) ===
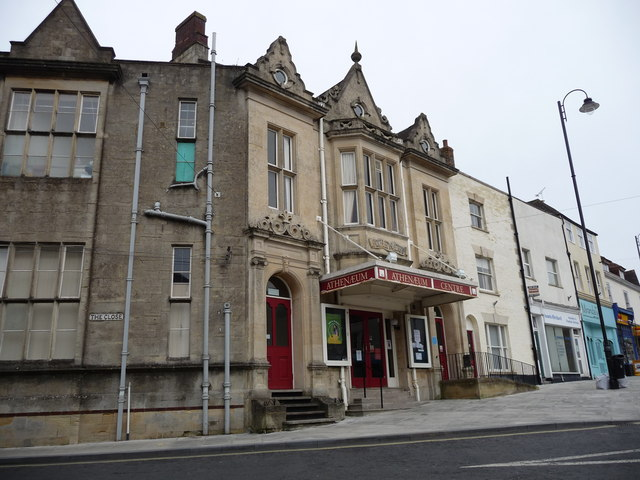
Former Warminster County School, where Dent's father was head teacher

From 1909, Dent was educated at Warminster County School, where her father was head teacher. At school, she was close friends with her neighbour at Portway, Evelyn Mary Day, the eldest daughter of Henry George Day, a former butler to Colonel Charles Gathorne Gathorne‑Hardy, son of Gathorne Gathorne-Hardy, 1st Earl of Cranbrook. (Note: Dent was a bridesmaid at Evelyn's wedding to Maurice Philip Young, a pharmacist, at the Minster Church of St Denys, Warminster, on 7 June 1926. At the time of her marriage, Evelyn was an assistant mistress at the Central County School, Church Road, Bexleyheath. Dent wore printed silk, with a shaded hat to match, and pink pearls, the gift of the bridegroom. She was known to friends and family as May Dent.) In August 1914, she passed the University of Oxford Junior Local Examination with First Class Honours, and on the strength of her examination result, she was awarded a scholarship by the school. In 1915, she passed the senior examination with second class honours and a distinction in French, and subsequently, her scholarship was renewed. She then joined the sixth form and won the school prize for French in December 1916. (Note: Dent's sister, Florence Mary, won the same prize for the year below.) In March 1918, she applied for a scholarship in mathematics from Somerville College, one of the first two women's colleges in the University of Oxford. She was highly commended but was not awarded a scholarship nor an exhibition.

=== University of Bristol (1919–1923) ===
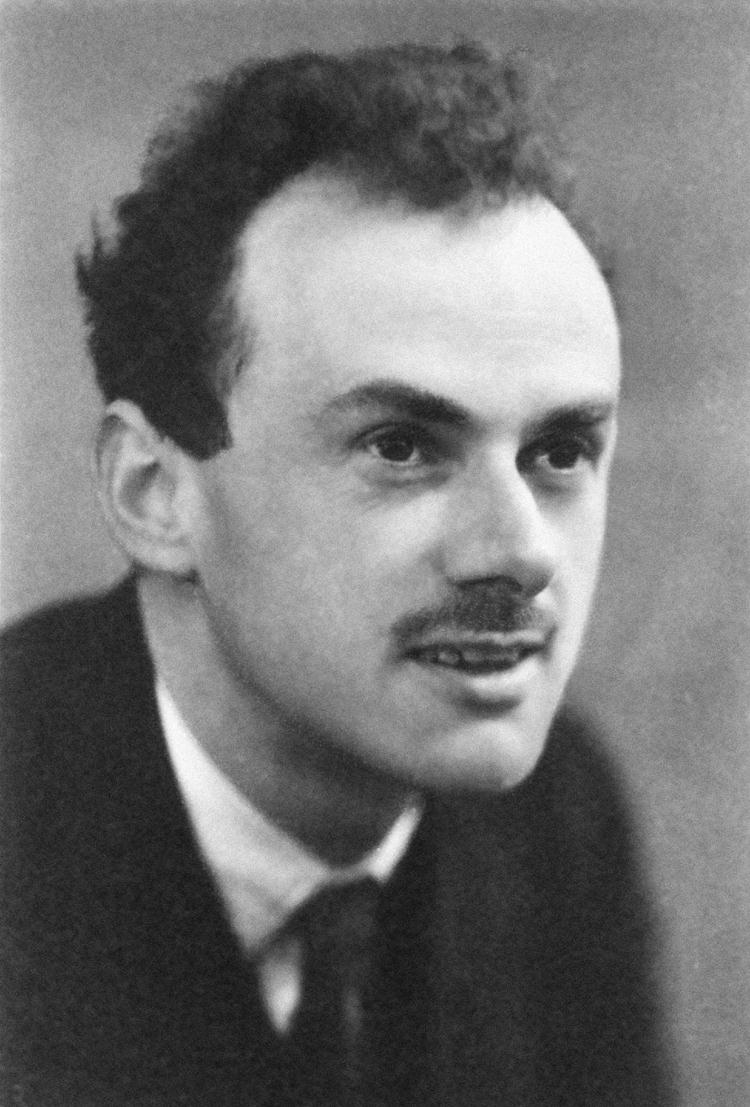
Paul Dirac, Dent's fellow student on the honours course in mathematics at Bristol

In 1918, Dent joined the Royal Aircraft Establishment (RAE) at Farnborough, Hampshire. The First World War opened new employment opportunities for women, and RAE was one of the first military establishments to recruit women into engineering, and mathematical and computational research. In the same period that Dent was at RAE, Lorna Swain, then mathematics tutor at Newnham College in the University of Cambridge, worked at the establishment on the problem of aircraft propeller vibration. The Treasury reduced RAE's funding after the end of the war, and consequently, the number of resources and staff available to support research fell significantly. In 1919, she left RAE after being accepted on to the general Bachelor of Arts (BA) degree course at the University of Bristol. (Note: The University of Bristol was the first higher education institute in England to admit women on an equal basis to men.) In June 1920, she passed her intermediate examination in French with supplementary courses in Latin, history, and mathematics. In July of the same year, she passed first class in the Cambridge Higher Local mathematics examination.

In the following academic year, Dent joined the honours course in mathematics and took an intermediate examination in physics. After spending the summer of 1921 at her parents' home in Warminster, she returned for the start of the 1921 to 1922 academic year to find that Paul Dirac had joined the mathematics course. The course of mathematics at Bristol University normally lasted three years, but because of Dirac's previous training, the Department of Mathematics had allowed him to join in the second year. They were taught applied mathematics by Henry Ronald Hassé, the then head of the Mathematics Department, and pure mathematics by Peter Fraser. Both of them had come from Cambridge; Fraser had been appointed in 1906 to the staff of the Bristol University College, soon to become the University of Bristol, and Hassé joined him in 1919 as professor of mathematics. Fraser introduced them to mathematical rigour, projective geometry, and rigorous proofs in differential and integral calculus. Dirac would later say that Peter Fraser was "the best teacher he had ever had."

Dent studied four courses in pure mathematics:

- Geometry of conics; differential geometry of plane curves
- Algebra and trigonometry; differential and integral calculus
- Analytical projective geometry of conics
- Differential equations; solid geometry

There was a choice of specialisation in the final year; applied or pure mathematics. As the only official, registered fee-paying student, Dent had the right to choose, and she settled on applied mathematics for the final year. The department could offer only one set of lectures so Dirac also had to follow the same course. (Note: Her relations with Dirac were strictly formal; they seldom spoke to each other.) Dent studied four courses in applied mathematics:

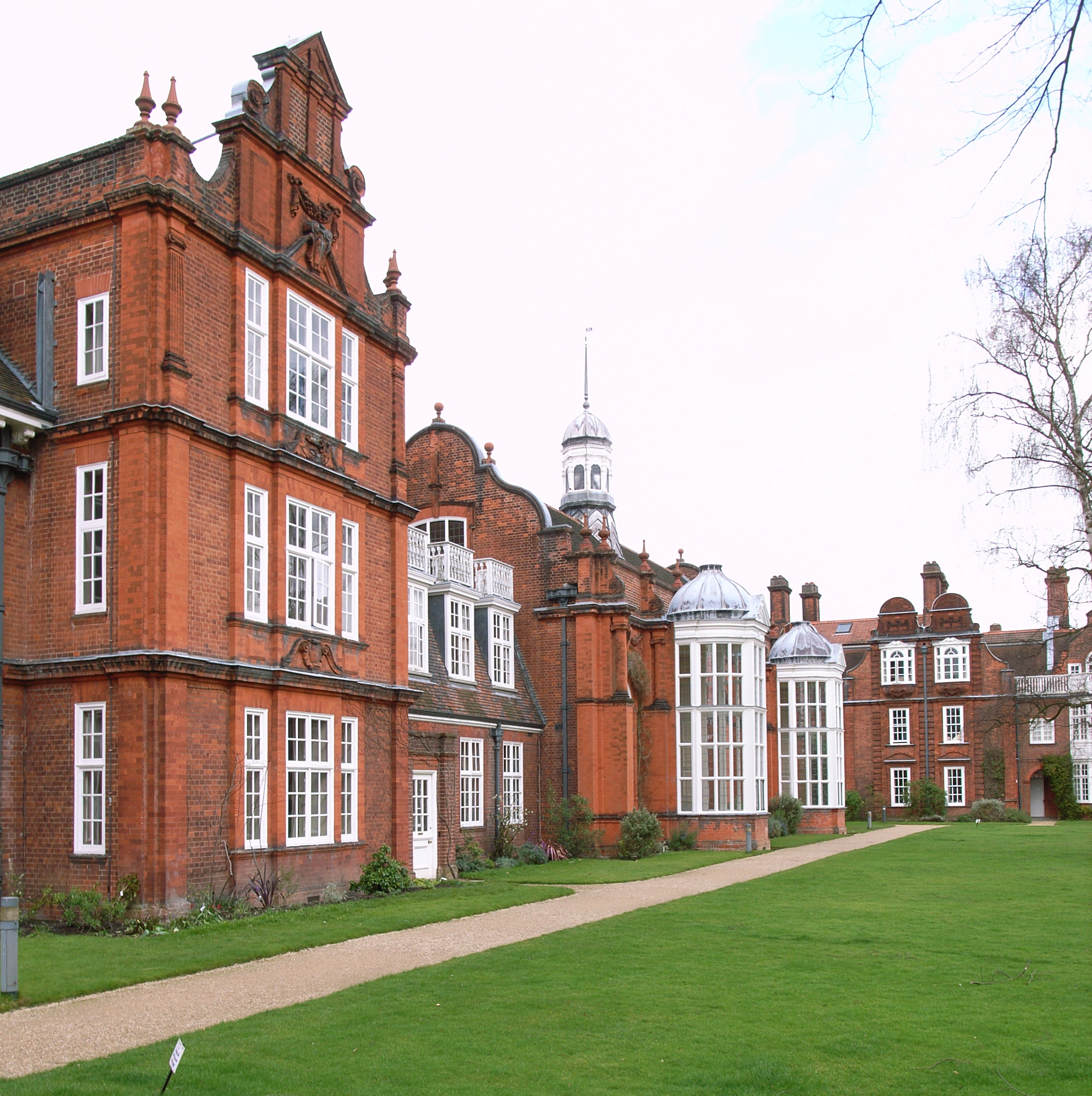
In 1923, Dent was accepted as a postgraduate research student by at Newnham College, University of Cambridge

- Elementary classical mechanics of a particle and of rigid bodies
- Graphical and analytical statics; Hydrostatics
- Dynamics of a particle and of rigid bodies
- Elementary theory of potential with applications to electricity and magnetism

=== Newnham College, University of Cambridge (1923–1924) ===
In June 1923, Dent graduated with Dirac, gaining a Bachelor of Science (BSc) degree in applied mathematics with First Class Honours. (Note: Dent's sister, Florence Mary, graduated at the same time with a Bachelor of Arts degree, that included supplementary courses in French, Italian, Latin, and logic.) On 7 July 1923, she was awarded the Ashworth Hallett scholarship by the University of Bristol and was accepted as a postgraduate student at Newnham College in the University of Cambridge. On her death in 1922, Lilias Sophia Ashworth Hallett left one thousand pounds each to the University of Bristol and Girton College, University of Cambridge, to found scholarships for women. The University of Bristol scholarship was open to women graduates of a recognised college or university, and worth £45 at the time (equivalent to £2,400 in 2025). She spent a year at Cambridge, leaving in 1924 without further academic qualification. Before 1948, the University of Cambridge denied women graduates a degree, although in the same year as she left Cambridge, Katharine Margaret Wilson was the first woman to be awarded a PhD by the university. (Note: Wilson later became a successful writer and poet. Wilson's dissertation, Music and English Poetry, featured at The Rising Tide: Women at Cambridge exhibition from October 2019.)

== Career ==
=== High School for Girls, Barnsley (1924–1925) ===
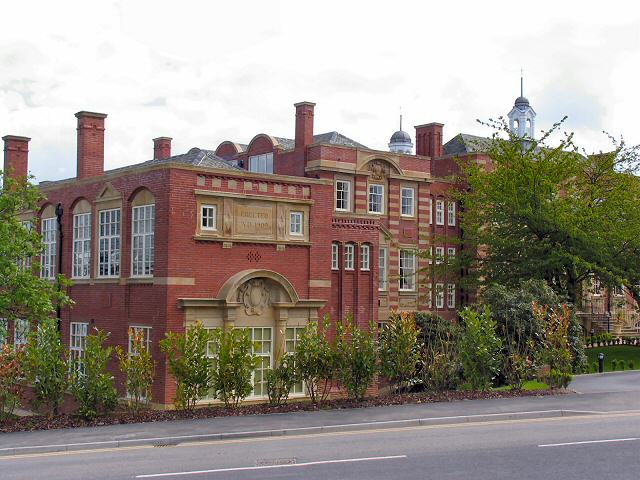
The former High School for Girls, Barnsley, where Dent taught mathematics after leaving Newnham College

Dent spent the summer of 1924 at her parents' home in Warminster, playing mixed doubles tennis in a tournament organised by the local Women's Unionist Association. In September of the same year, she was appointed an assistant teacher in mathematics at the High School for Girls, in Barnsley, Huddersfield Road, on an annual salary of £250 (equivalent to £13,100 in 2025). Annie Rose Nuttall, the school's head teacher, was a former student at Newnham College. (Note: Nuttall had travelled to Dublin in July 1905, along with ninety-two other women from Oxford and Cambridge, to be awarded a bachelor's and master's degree by Trinity College Dublin. The college had an arrangement where women, who had qualified for arts degrees at Oxford and Cambridge, could obtain the actual degrees on payment of a fee.) In the early 1920s, women who had studied university level mathematics faced limited employment prospects, as mathematics and engineering professions, other than perhaps school teaching, were dominated by men. Dent resigned her position on 31 August 1925 after being appointed a demonstrator (research assistant) in the Department of Physics at the University of Bristol, with her salary being paid by the Department of Scientific and Industrial Research, the forerunner of the Science and Engineering Research Council (SERC). (Note: Paul Dirac was also in receipt of a Research Council grant at this point with his research interests listed under Dent's entry in the Research Council's report for the year 1925 to 1926.)

=== Department of Physics, University of Bristol (1925–1929) ===
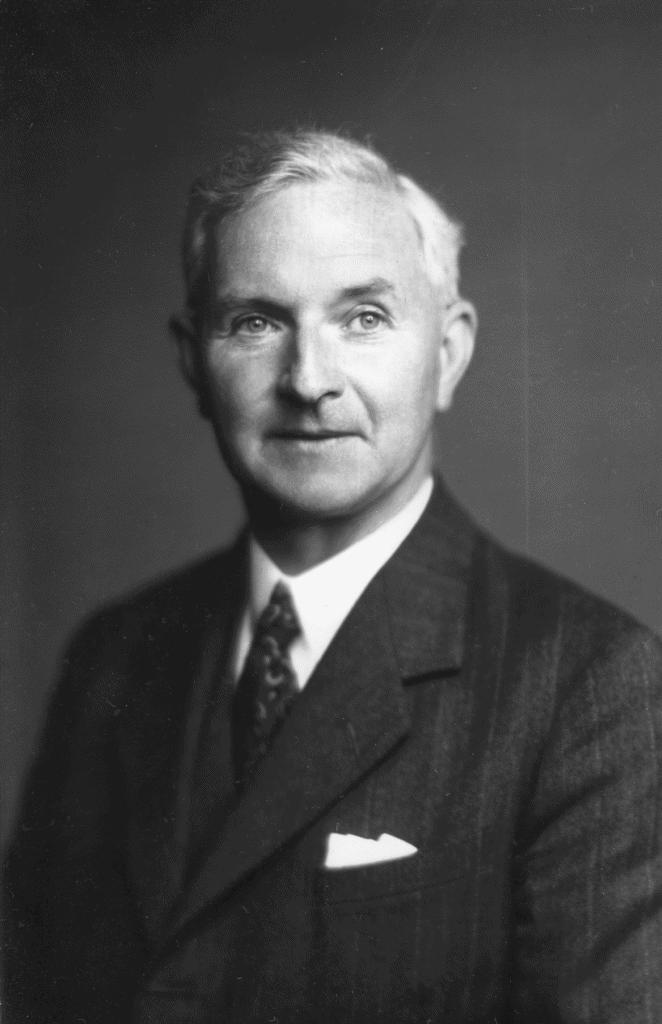
John Edward Lennard‑Jones, Dent's advisor and co-author at Bristol in the 1920s

In 1924, the University of Bristol Council had set aside a portion of a bequest from Henry Herbert Wills for the Department of Physics where Arthur Mannering Tyndall was building up a staff for teaching and research in the H. H. Wills Physics Laboratory, Royal Fort House Gardens. (Note: Tyndall became the "father" of the School of Physics. A lecturer and then professor who researched the mobility of ions in gases, Tyndall persuaded the Bristol industrialist Henry Herbert Wills to endow a purpose-built physics laboratory.) From August 1925, John Lennard-Jones, of Trinity College, University of Cambridge, was elected reader in mathematical physics. In March 1927, Lennard‑Jones was appointed Professor of Theoretical physics, a chair being created for him, with Dent becoming his research assistant in theoretical physics. (Note: This was the first appointment of a professor of theoretical physics in the United Kingdom.) Lennard‑Jones pioneered the theory of interatomic and intermolecular forces at Bristol and Dent became one of his first collaborators.

Lennard‑Jones and Dent published six papers together from 1926 to 1928, dealing with the forces between atoms and ions, with the objective of calculating theoretically the properties of carbonate and nitrate crystals. Dent's thesis for her master's degree, Some theoretical determinations of crystal structure (1927), was the basis of the three papers that followed in 1927; with Lennard‑Jones, "Some theoretical determinations of crystal parameters. CXVI", and with Lennard‑Jones and Sydney Chapman, "Structure of carbonate crystals" and "Part II. Structure of carbonate crystals". (Note: Sydney Chapman was Lennard‑Jones' PhD thesis advisor at Trinity College, Cambridge.) On 28 June 1927, she was awarded a MSc degree for her thesis and research work. In 1927, the physics laboratory at Bristol had a surplus of funds, and so it was decided that the funds would be used to provide more technical help. (Note: Despite the fact that the department had acquired a second professor and two research fellows.) Consequently, Dent was asked to combine her research duties with the post of part-time departmental librarian, the first appointment of librarian in the Department of Physics. (Note: The library had been named after Maria Mercer, the last surviving daughter of John Mercer, a Lancashire weaver who taught himself sufficient chemistry to be elected to a Fellowship of the Royal Society in 1852. Mercer was the inventor of the process of treating cotton known as mercerisation, and had amassed a considerable fortune. When Maria died, on 22 February 1913 at Clayton-le-Moors, aged 93, her trustees offered "not less than £5,000" to the University of Bristol, towards the endowment of a Chair of Chemistry.)

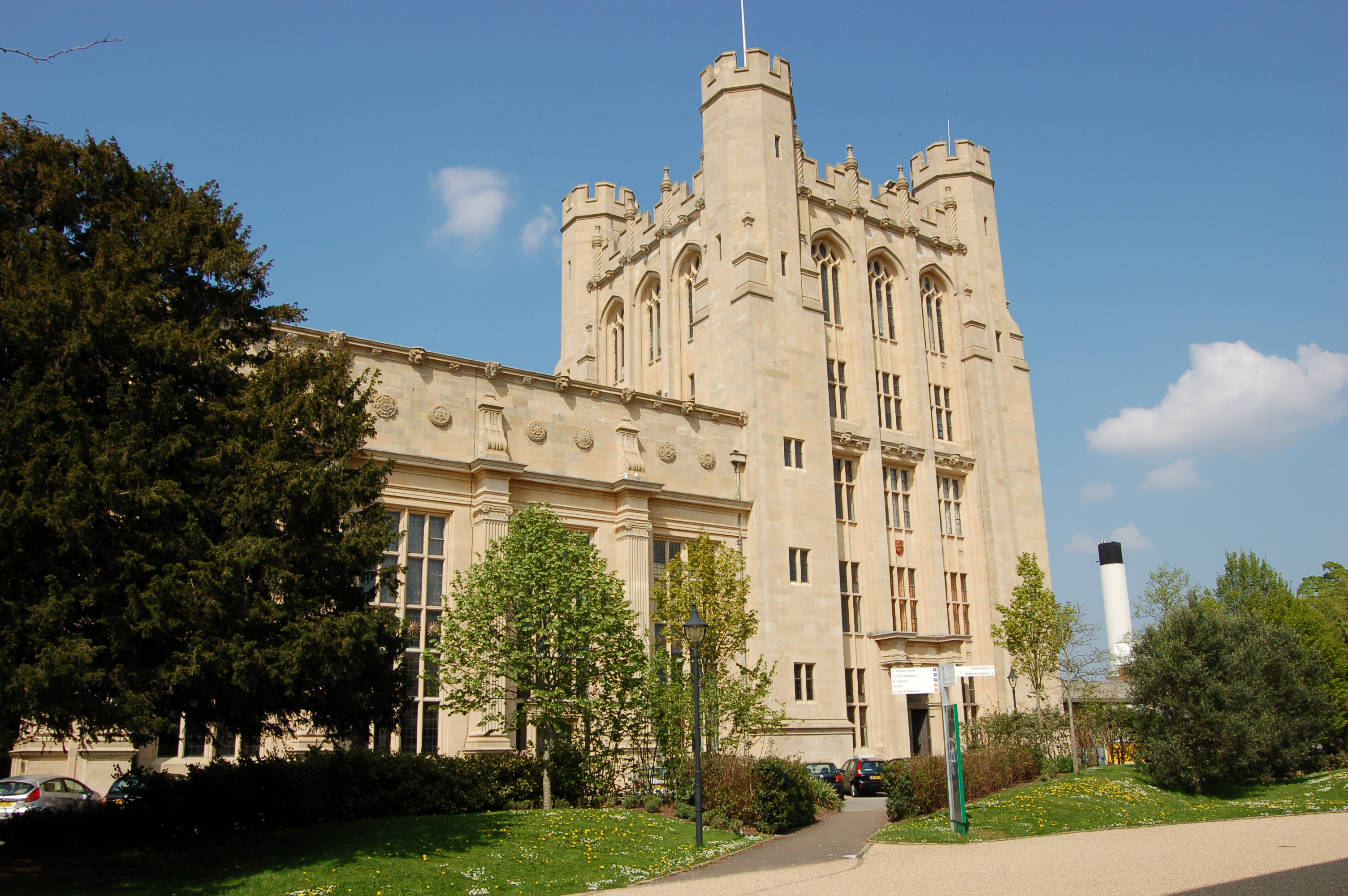
H. H. Wills Physics Laboratory, University of Bristol, where Dent worked as a researcher

In 1928, Lennard‑Jones and Dent published two papers, "Cohesion at a crystal surface", and with Sydney Chapman, "The change in lattice spacing at a crystal boundary", that studied the force fields on a thin crystal cleavage. Around this time, quantum mechanics was developed to become the standard formulation for atomic physics. (Note: See the Fifth Solvay Conference in 1927.) Lennard‑Jones left Bristol in 1929 to study the subject for a year as a Rockefeller Fellow at the University of Göttingen. She wrote one last paper before leaving the physics department at Bristol: "The effect of boundary distortion on the surface energy of a crystal" (1929) examined the effect of the polarisation of surface ions in decreasing the surface energy of alkali halides. In November 1929, she was appointed to the position of technical librarian for the scientific and technical staff in the research department at Metropolitan-Vickers, Trafford Park, Manchester.

In December 1929, Dent resigned her position at Bristol and it was accepted with regret by the university council. Marjorie Josephine Littleton, the daughter of a local Bristol councillor and a graduate of Girton College, University of Cambridge, was appointed as her replacement on the 1 February 1930. Littleton was later Sir Nevill Mott's co-author and research assistant in the physics department. In 1930, Lennard‑Jones returned to Bristol, as Dean of the Faculty of Science, and introduced the new quantum theories to the Bristol group. (Note: In 1932, Lennard‑Jones was elected to the Plummer Chair of Theoretical Chemistry in the University of Cambridge: The first person to hold a Chair of Theoretical Chemistry anywhere in the world. John Murrell has stated that Lennard‑Jones played an early and very important role in developing the linear combination of atomic orbitals method for describing molecular orbital theory (known as MO theory).)

=== Metropolitan-Vickers, Trafford Park (1930–1960) ===
Metropolitan-Vickers was a British heavy industrial firm, well-known for industrial electrical equipment and generators, street lighting, electronics, steam turbines, and diesel locomotives. They built the Metrovick 950, the first commercial transistorised computer. In 1917, a Research and Education Department was established at the Trafford Park site, when the care of the library came within the remit of James George Pearce. He made the library the centre of a new "technical intelligence" section. (Note: Pearce was later appointed director and secretary of the British Cast Iron Research Association.) In the 1920s, the post of librarian was held by Lucy Stubbs, a former assistant librarian at the University of Birmingham, and past member of the first standing committee of ASLIB. Stubbs did not possess scientific qualifications, maintaining that a librarian, if assisted by other technical staff, did not need to understand science or engineering. In 1929, James Steele Park Paton reorganised and expanded the section with Dent succeeding Stubbs as technical librarian on 6 January 1930. She joined the scientific and technical staff as was one of only two senior women in the research department, and in contrast to Stubbs, was employed principally for her technical skills.

Dent was honorary secretary to the founding committee for the ASLIB Lancashire and Cheshire branch from 1931 to 1936. In 1932, the branch had twenty-six members and had organised four meetings, including one addressed by Sir Henry Tizard, the then President of ASLIB. After the war, it formed the basis for the Northern Branch of the association. Technical librarianship emerged as a new scientific career in interwar Britain and rapidly became one of the few types of professional industrial employment that was routinely open to both women and men. By 1933, Dent reported that the Metropolitan-Vickers library had three thousand engineering volumes and around the same number in pamphlets and patent specifications. Besides covering electrical subjects, the library covered accountancy, employment questions, and subjects of interest to the sales department. It also issued a weekly bulletin, scrutinised patents, handled patents taken out by research staff, and exchanged information with associated companies.

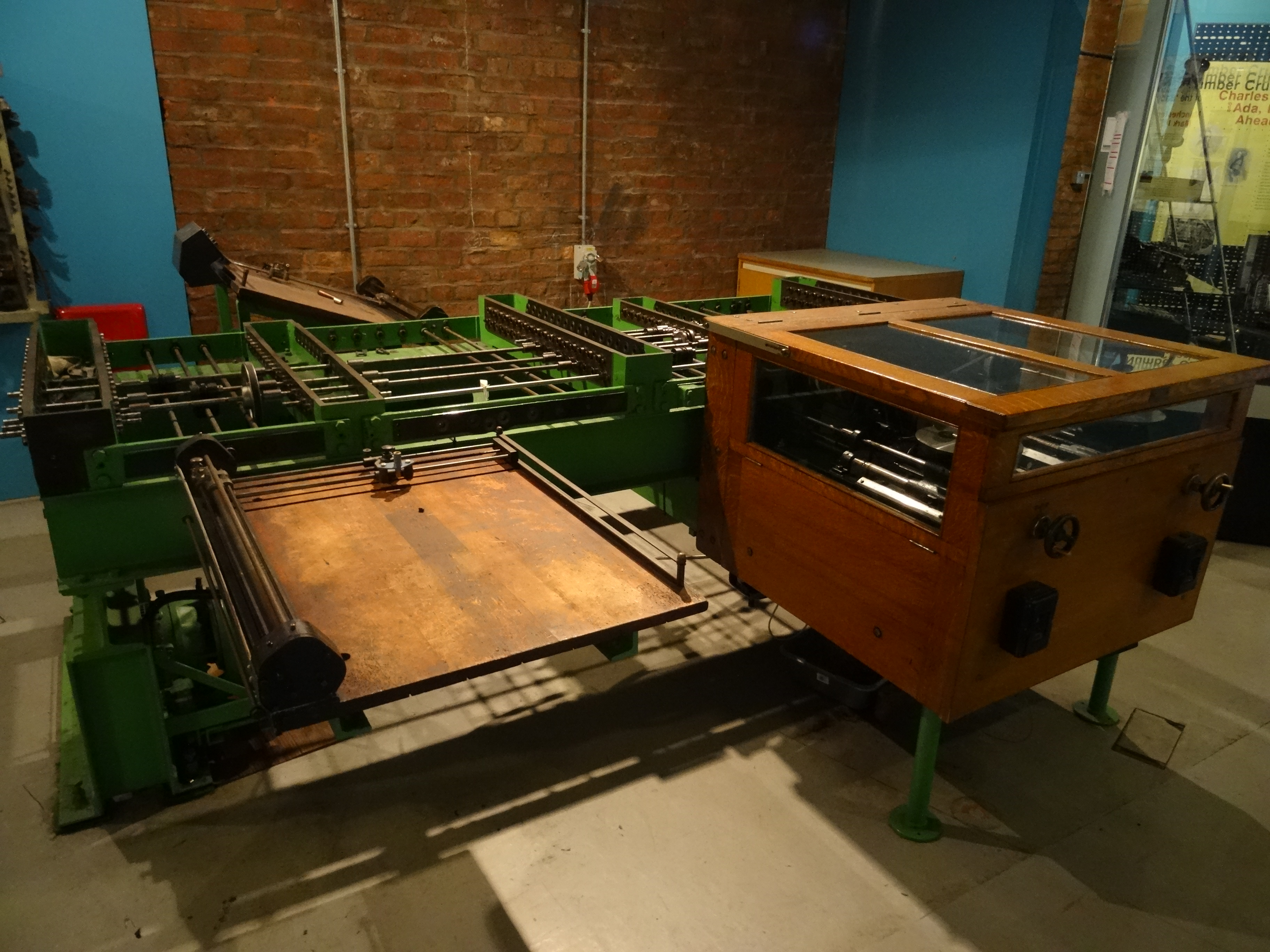
Differential analyser designed by Douglas Hartree, at the Science and Industry Museum in Manchester

Dent continued to publish papers in applied mathematics and contribute to papers on emerging computational technologies. In "On observations of points connected by a linear relation" (1935), she developed a detailed reduced major axis method for line fitting that built on the work of Robert Adcock and Charles Kummell. In 1937, David Myers, then at the Engineering Laboratory at the University of Oxford, asked Douglas Hartree and Arthur Porter to calculate the space charge limitation of secondary current in a triode. The calculations relied on some initial numerical integrations that were carried out by Dent on a differential analyser. The results corresponded closely to those obtained experimentally by Myers at Oxford. Her knowledge of higher mathematics meant that she was asked to check the mathematics in papers for publication by engineers at Metropolitan-Vickers. For example, Cyril Frederick Gradwell, a graduate of Trinity College, Cambridge, asked her to scrutinise the algebraic part of his work in "The Solution of a problem in disk bending occurring in connexion with gas turbines" (1950). (Note: Along with Dent, Cyril Gradwell was one of the first programmers of the Ferranti Mark 1 computer. He wrote system software subroutines (for example Input G and Reciprocal G) that had advantages over the original versions written by Alan Turing. He wrote Mark I programs for Ferranti's guided missile work for the Royal Aircraft Establishment (RAE) at Farnborough, and on cotton spinning applications for the British Cotton Industry Research Association's Shirley Institute at Didsbury.) She would later analyse the problem of stress distribution in a thick disk based on a method devised by Philip Pollock, for Richard William Bailey, the former director of the mechanical, metallurgical, and chemical sections of the research department at Metropolitan-Vickers. (Note: See Pollock's commentary in "Discussion on 'The Design of High‑Speed Salient‑Pole A.C. Generators for Water Power Plants'" (1952, published 1955) for an explanation of Richard Southwell's relaxation method that was used to calculate the stress distribution.)

Dent was a delegate at the fourteenth International Conference on Documentation and was invited to the Government's conference dinner on 22 September 1938 at the Great Dining Hall of Christ Church, Oxford. (Note: Earl Stanhope, President of the Board of Education, was in the chair at the dinner.) In 1939, she was elected to the editing committee of the ASLIB book list. In 1944, she was put in charge of the women working in the research department laboratory at Metropolitan-Vickers, and in 1946, she was promoted to section leader of the new computation section. Her role would bring her into contact with Audrey Stuckes, a materials science researcher in the department, and a graduate of Newnham College, who would later head the physics department at the University of Salford. In 1953, they collaborated on an investigation into the heating effects that occur when a current is passed through a semiconductor that has no barrier layer. Dent suggested methods to solve the equations and computed the numerical integrations. In the following year, she developed the Fourier analysis in "Regenerative Deflection as a Parametrically Excited Resonance Phenomenon" (1954), that calculated the optimal radial oscillations to maintain cyclotron resonance in a synchrocyclotron. The causes of axial spreading of the charged particle beam during extraction were also analysed.

Dent joined the Women's Engineering Society and published papers on the application of digital computers to electrical design. With Brian Birtwistle, she wrote programs for the Ferranti Mark 1 (Mark 1) computer at the University of Manchester, that demonstrated that high-speed digital computers could provide considerable assistance to the electrical design engineer. Birtwistle would later have an extensive career in the computer industry, working at, amongst others, Honeywell Information Systems and ADP Network Services. In 1958, she carried out computer calculations for the mechanical engineering team at the Nuclear Power Group, Radbroke Hall. Their paper outlined a procedure for calculating the theoretical deflection (bending) of a circular grid of support girders for a graphite neutron moderator in a gas-cooled reactor. A general expression was derived from the central deflection of the grid and the maximum bending moment on the central cross-beam for a range of grid diameters.

In 1959, and a year from retirement, Dent modelled a proposed Zeta circuit on the Mark 1 computer, for Eric Hartill's paper on constructing a high-power pulse transformer and circuit. The cost of the computation was about two thousand pounds (equivalent to £40,000 in 2025), corresponding to around eighty hours of machine time. She retired from Metropolitan-Vickers in May 1960, with Isabel Hardwich, later a fellow and president of the Women's Engineering Society, replacing her as section leader for the women in the research department.

== Personal life ==
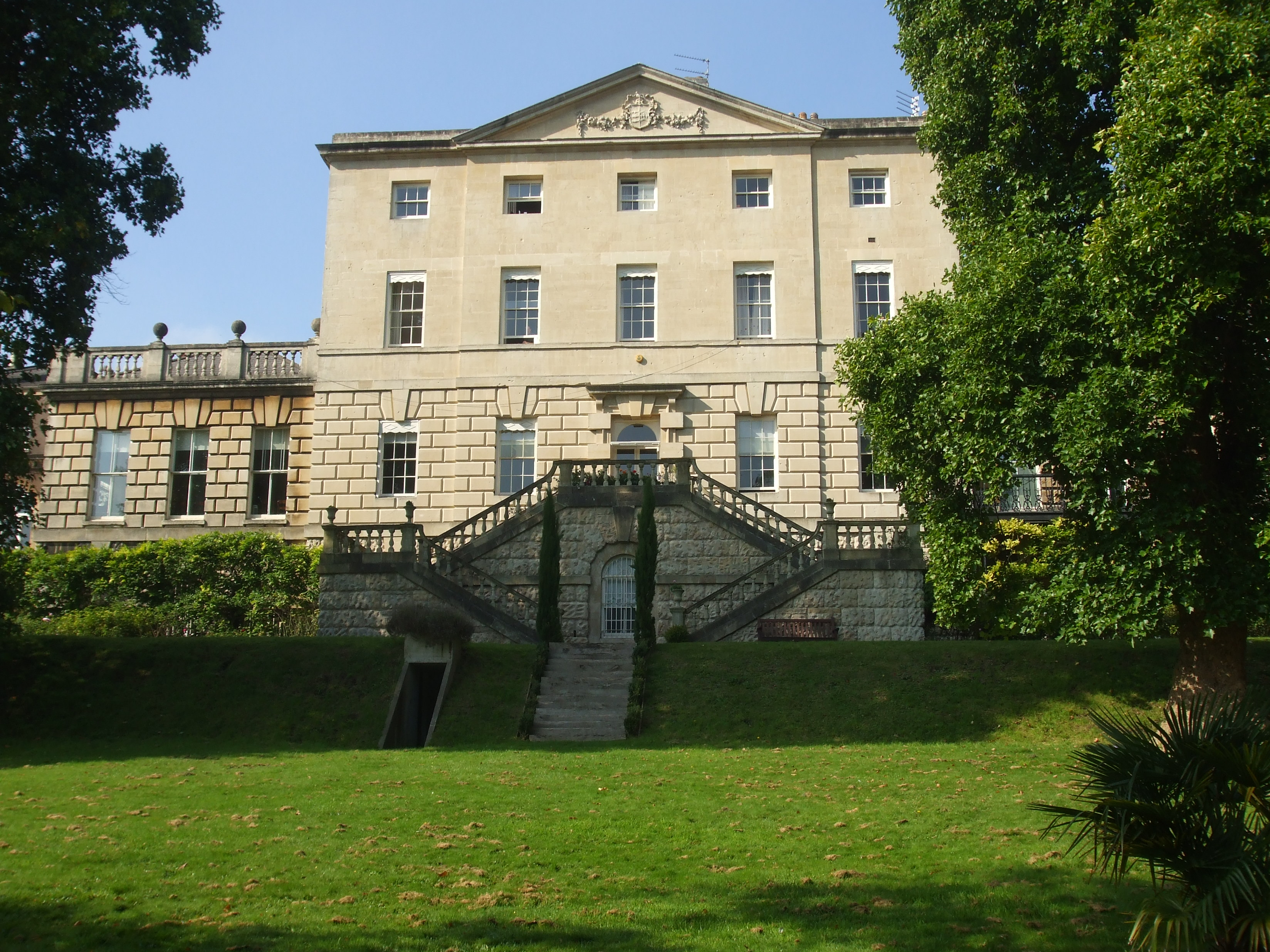
Clifton Hill House where Dent was resident in the 1920s

In the 1920s, Dent was living at Clifton Hill House, the university hall of residence for women in Clifton. May Christophera Staveley was her warden and tutor at Clifton Hill House, and Dent returned to Bristol on 22 December 1934 for Staveley's funeral. Dent was a member of the Clifton Hill House Old Students Association, and secretary and treasurer of the group of former Clifton Hill House students. She would later write "I was very sorry indeed to leave Bristol and have many happy memories of my time there. I shall miss living at the [Clifton Hill House] Hall very much."

In 1926, Dent was elected treasurer of the University of Bristol's Convocation, the university's alumni association. In 1927, she was one of eleven people elected to the standing committee of the Convocation She later represented the Manchester branch of the association. Around 1926, Dent was appointed honorary secretary of the Bristol Cheeloo Association. The association's aim was to raise sufficient funds to support a chair of chemistry at Cheeloo University. In an effort to publicise the cause and raise money, she presented to the local branch of the Women's International League in October 1928.

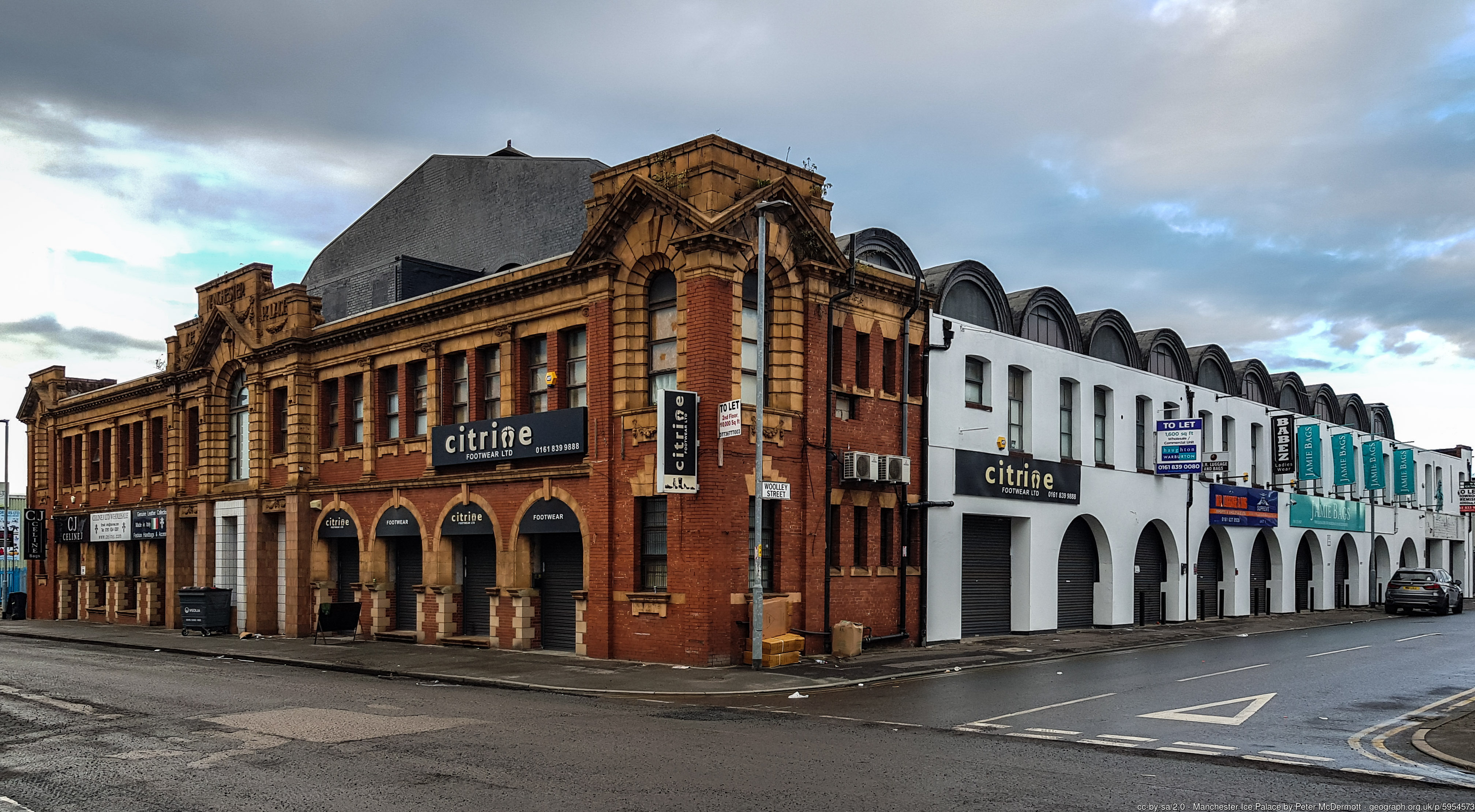
The Ice Palace skating rink in Cheetham Hill where Dent learnt to figure skate in the early 1930s

In July 1929, in Dent's last year at Bristol, she went on holiday to North Devon with friends that included Gertrude Roxbee, known as "Rox", who had graduated with Dent in 1923 with a BSc in botany. After moving to Manchester in January 1930, Dent found shared lodgings at 10 Montrose Avenue, West Didsbury, in the same house as Roxbee who, at that time, was a teacher at Whalley Range High School. At weekends, she would ramble to Hebden Bridge, and with Roxbee, learnt to figure skate at the Ice Palace, a former ice rink on Derby Street in Cheetham Hill.

In September 1930, she returned to Bristol for the ninety-eighth conference of the British Association for the Advancement of Science (British Association), meeting her friends at an alumnae association lunch. In the afternoon of the 4 September 1930, she toured Avonmouth Docks as a conference member, and in the evening, was invited to a reception held by Walter Bryant, the then lord mayor of Bristol, at the Bristol Museum & Art Gallery.. On the following day, she visited an aircraft manufacturer at Whitchurch Airport and attended a garden party at Wills Hall. On the Monday of the conference, Dent was in the audience to see Paul Dirac present his paper on the proton and the structure of matter. She would later comment:

I heard a striking paper by Dirac, who was a student with me, who is now a very famous person, as I always knew he would be ... I now go about boasting that I was in the same class!

Dent's father died on 24 June 1954, at their shared home, 529 King's Road, Stretford, with the funeral service taking place at St Matthew's Church, Stretford. She had close links to St Matthew's; from 1956 to 1962, she served as a school manager for St Matthew's Church of England Primary School at Poplar Road, Stretford.

== Later life and death ==
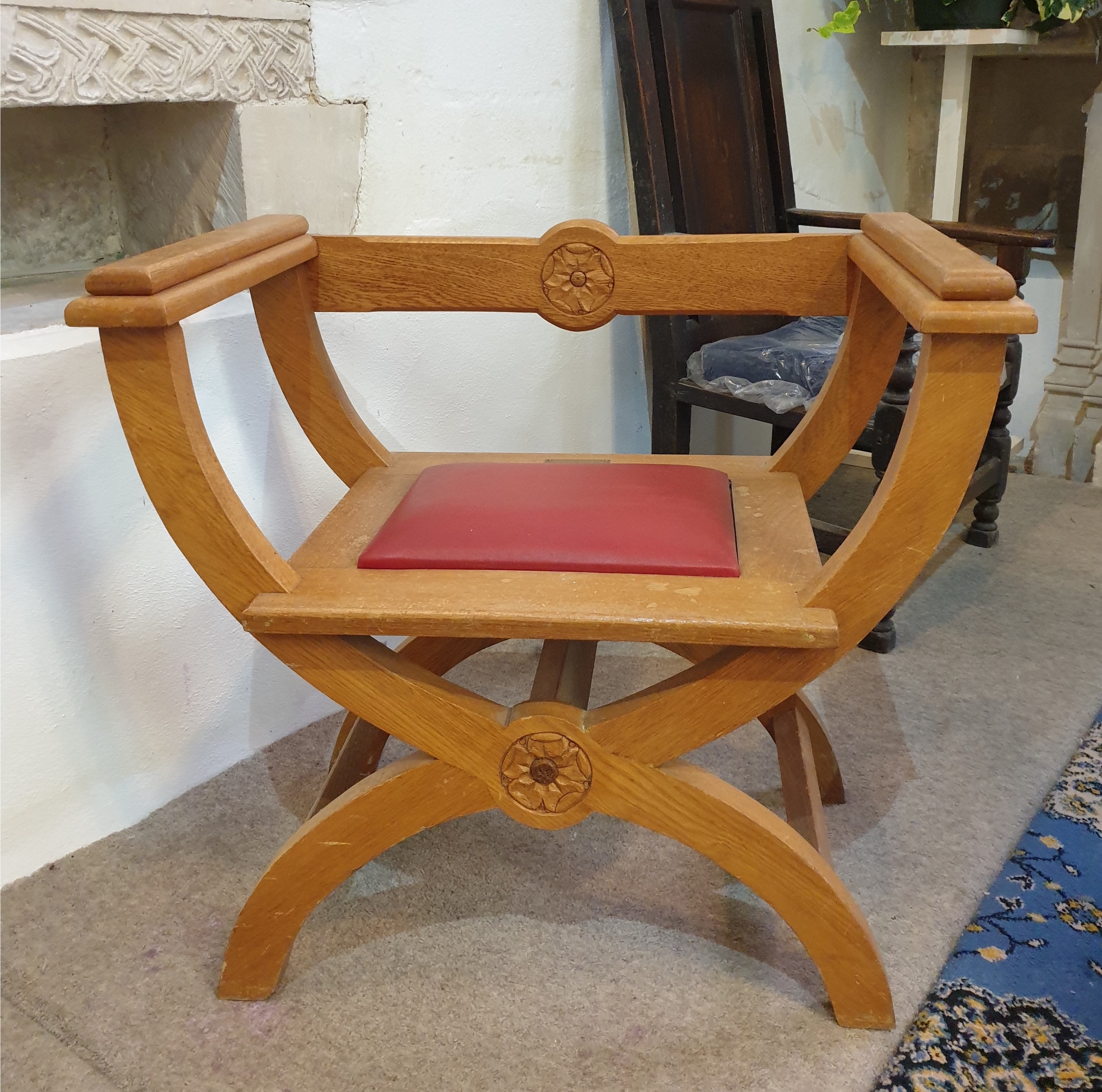
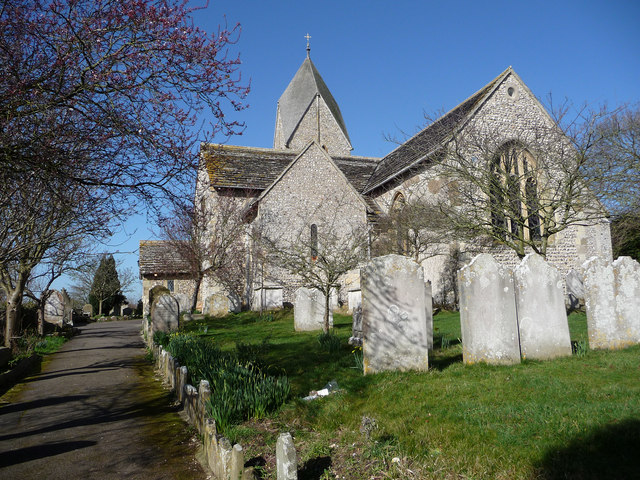
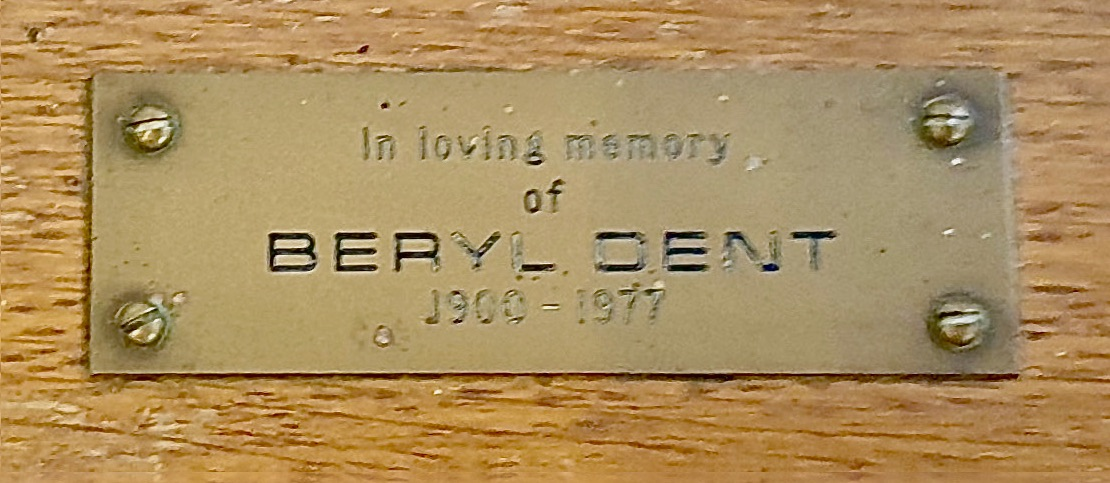
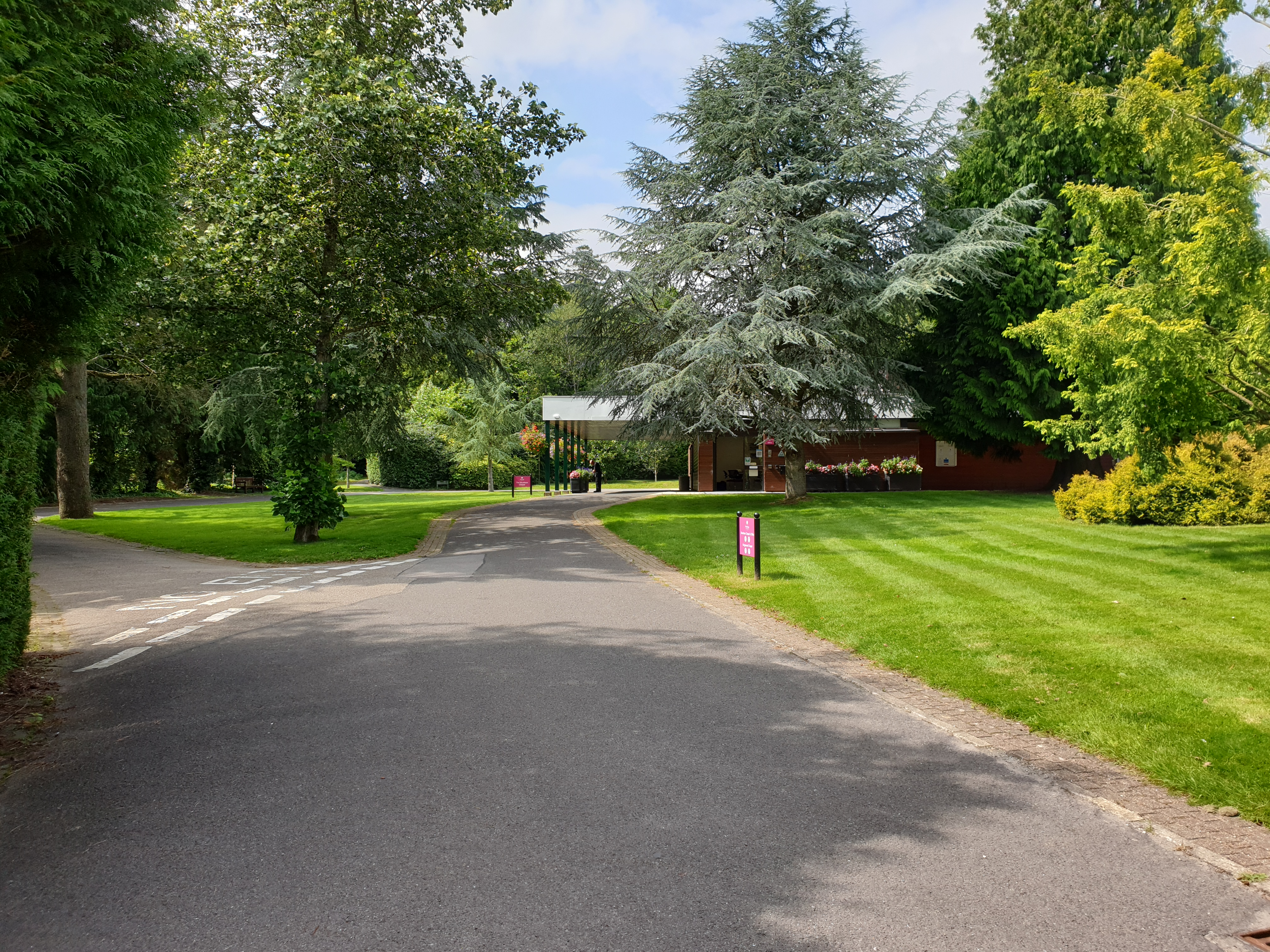
Dent's funeral was held at Sompting parish church and a memorial to her is inscribed on a brass plaque affixed to the bishop's chair at the church. Her ashes are interred at Worthing Crematorium.

In 1962, Dent and her mother moved from Stretford to 1 Cokeham Road, Sompting, a village in the coastal Adur District of West Sussex, between Lancing and Worthing. Her mother died on 5 April 1967 and was cremated at the Downs Crematorium on 10 April 1967. Dent's sister, Florence Mary, also lived in the house until her death on 13 September 1986 (aged 84). After a brief period as a teacher at a prep school in Malmesbury, Wiltshire, Florence worked as a secretary for a marine insurance firm attached to Lloyd's of London at 12 Leadenhall Street, commuting into London from Harrow each day.

Dent considered herself to be an Anglican layperson who was neither high nor low church. In April 1970, she was elected treasurer of Lancing and Sompting Churches Fraternal (the parish fraternity organisation), and in March 1972, she was elected electoral officer for the parochial church council of St Mary's Church, Sompting. Her Christian faith is perhaps not unexpected, given her father's work for the church in Warminster, and the era she grew up in, where religion pervaded social and political life. However, it is notable that she remained a Christian while pursuing a scientific career.

In June 1974, Dent was hospitalised for seven weeks at Southlands Hospital, Shoreham-by-Sea, and after a long period of disablement, she died at Worthing Hospital on 9 August 1977 (aged 77). The funeral service was held on 12 August 1977 at St Mary's, followed by cremation. Her ashes were interred at Worthing Crematorium, in the Gardens of Rest, towards the Spring Glades, and her entry in the book of remembrance at the crematorium states: (Note: Dent is interred in row 11, plot 32, on a mowed lawn area, where the markers are in the form of small brass plaques set into the lawn, approximately 15 by 10 cm (6 by 4 in) in size. Dent's sister, Florence Mary, is also interred at the crematorium.)

Beryl May Dent 1900 – A real Christian loved by all – 1977

The bishop's chair at St Mary's, situated close to the altar, bears a brass plaque with the following inscription: (Note: Similarly, Dent's mother, Agnes, is remembered on a brass plaque at the east end of the choir stall.)

In loving memory of BERYL DENT 1900 – 1977

== Legacy ==
An archive of Dent's papers, that relate to her life and work in the 1920s in the physics department at the University of Bristol, is held in the Special Collections of the University of Bristol Arts and Social Sciences Library, in Tyndall Avenue, Bristol. Included in that archive is a series of letterbooks, written in the 1930s by members of the Clifton Hill House Old Students' Association, that include news and photographs of Dent, her family, and friends.

A blue plaque was unveiled in Dent's honour on 9 August 2025 at St Antony's Heritage Centre, Trafford Park Village, Trafford.

=== Atomic force microscopy ===
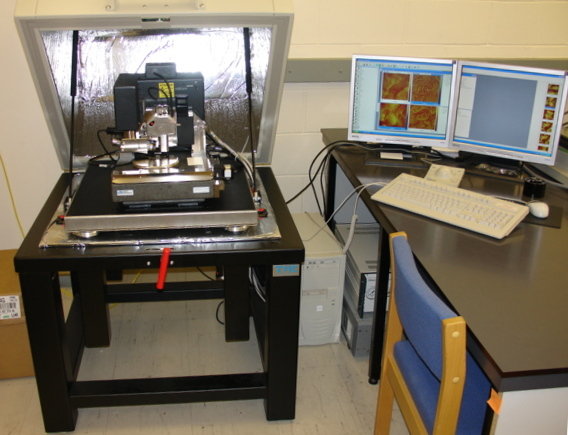
An atomic force microscope on the left with controlling computer on the right. Dent's work had direct application to the development of atomic force microscopy

In 1928, Lennard‑Jones and Dent published two papers, "Cohesion at a crystal surface" and "The change in lattice spacing at a crystal boundary", that for the first time, outlined a calculation of the potential of the electric field in a vacuum, produced by a thin sodium chloride crystal surface. They gave an expression for the electric potential produced by a system of point charges in vacuum (although not a real cubic sodium chloride ionic lattice). The expression for the potential in vacuum, $\varphi_{0}\left(r\right)$, at the point r = {x, y, z}, near the cubic lattice of point ions with different signs, the charge $e_{k}$, and the period a (a crystalline solid is distinguished by the fact that the atoms making up the crystal are arranged in a periodic fashion), can be represented in the form:

$\varphi_{0}\left(r\right)= \frac{2\pi}{a^{2}} \sum_{l,m}\sum_{s} \frac{\left(-1\right)^{s} \exp \left[ -\left(\frac{2\pi}{a}\right) \sqrt{l^{2}+m^{2}} \left(z+z_{s}\right) \right]} {\left|k_{l,m}\right|} \times \sum_{k}e_{k}\cos \left[k_{l,m}\left(r_{\parallel}-r_{k}\right)\right]$

1

$r_{\parallel}=\left\{x,y\right\}$ is the lateral vector that fixes the observation point coordinates in the sample plane.
$k_{l,m}$ is the reciprocal lattice vector.
s is the number of planes to be calculated inside the crystal; s set to zero would calculate the surface plane.

The expression sums the set of potential static charges for the surface and lower planes of the crystal lattice. Lennard‑Jones and Dent showed that this expression forms a rapidly convergent Fourier series. Harold Eugene Buckley, a crystallographic researcher at the University of Manchester until his death in 1959, had suggested that their results should be treated with caution. For example, the contraction a crystal plane would suffer under the conditions prescribed would not be the same as that of a similar plane with a solid mass of crystal behind it. Another difficulty arises because calculation of crystal surface field force fields are so great that simplifying assumptions have to be made to render them capable of a solution.

Michael Jaycock and Geoffrey Parfitt, then respectively senior lecturer in surface and colloid chemistry at Loughborough University of Technology and professor of chemical engineering at Carnegie Mellon University, concurred with Buckley, noting that "an ideal crystal, in which the ionic positions at the surface were identical to those achieved in the bulk crystal ... is obviously extremely improbable." However, they acknowledged that the Lennard‑Jones and Dent model was singularly elegant, and like most researchers working before the advent of modern computers, they were limited in what could be attempted computationally. Nonetheless, Lennard‑Jones and Dent demonstrated that the force exerted on a single ion, by a surface with evenly distributed positive and negative ions, decreases very rapidly with increasing distance. Later work by Jason Cleveland, Manfred Radmacher, and Paul Hansma, has shown that this result has direct application to atomic force microscopy by predicting that non-contact imaging is possible only at small tip-sample separations.

=== Reduced major axis regression ===
Linear regression attempts to model the relationship between two variables by fitting a linear equation (straight line) to observed data

The theoretical underpinnings of standard least squares regression analysis are based on the assumption that the independent variable (often labelled as x) is measured without error as a design variable. The dependent variable (labeled y) is modeled as having uncertainty or error. Both independent and dependent measurements may have multiple sources of error. Therefore, the underlying least squares regression assumptions can be violated. Reduced major axis (RMA) regression is specifically formulated to handle errors in both the x and y variables. If the estimate of the ratio of the error variance of y to the error variance of x is denoted by 𝜆, then the reduced major axis method assumes that 𝜆 can be approximated by the ratio of the total variances of x and y. RMA minimizes both vertical and horizontal distances of the data points from the predicted line (by summing areas) rather than the least squares sum of squared vertical (y-axis) distances.

In Dent's 1935 paper on linear regression, entitled "On observations of points connected by a linear relation", she admitted that when the variances in the x and y variables are unknown, "we cannot hope to find the true positions of the observed points, but only their most probable positions." However, by treating the probability of the errors in terms of Gaussian error functions, she contended that this expression may be regarded as "a function of the unknown quantities", or the likelihood function of the data distribution. Furthermore, she argued that maximising this function to obtain the maximum likelihood estimation, subject to the condition that the points are collinear, will give the parameters for the line of best fit. She then deduced formulae for the errors in estimating the centroid and the line inclination when the data consists of a single (unrepeated) observation.

Maurice Kendall and Alan Stuart showed that the maximum likelihood estimator of a likelihood function, depending on a parameter $\theta$, satisfies the following quadratic equation:

$\theta^{2}x^{T}y+\left[\lambda x^{T}x-y^{T}y\right]\theta-\lambda x^{T}y=0$

2

where $x$ and $y$ are the $\mathbf{X}$ and $\mathbf{Y}$ vectors in a covariance matrix giving the covariance between each pair of x and y variables. The superscript $T$ indicates the transpose of the matrix.

Using the quadratic formula to solve for the positive root (or zero) of (2):

$\theta_{ML}\equiv\frac{y^{T}y-\lambda x^{T}x+\sqrt{(y^{T}y-\lambda x^{T}x)^{2} + 4\lambda (x^{T}y)^{2}}}{2x^{T}y}$

3

Inspection of (3) shows that as 𝜆 tends to plus infinity, the positive root tends to:

$\theta_{x}$, equal to $\frac{x^{T}y}{x^{T}x}$

4

Correspondingly, as 𝜆 tends to zero, the root tends to:

$\theta_{y}$, equal to $\frac{y^{T}y}{x^{T}y}$

5

Dent had solved the maximum likelihood estimator in the case where the covariance matrix is not known. Dent's maximum likelihood estimator is the geometric mean of $\theta_{x}$ and $\theta_{y}$, equivalent to:

$\theta_{ML}\equiv\sqrt{\frac{x^{T}y}{x^{T}x}\times{\frac{y^{T}y}{x^{T}y}}}\equiv\sqrt{\frac{{y^{T}y}}{{x^{T}x}}}$, where $x^{T}y$ is positive.

6

Dennis Lindley repeated Dent's analysis and stated that Dent's geometric mean estimator is not a consistent estimator for the likelihood function, and that the gradient of the estimate will have a bias, and this remains true even if the number of observations tends to infinity. Subsequently, Theodore Anderson pointed out that the likelihood function has no maximum in this case, and therefore, there is no maximum likelihood estimator. Kenneth Alva Norton, a former consulting engineer with the then National Bureau of Standards, responded to Lindley, stating Lindley's own methods and assumptions lead to a biased prediction. Furthermore, Albert Madansky, late H. G. B. Alexander professor of business administration at University of Chicago Booth School of Business, noted that Lindley took the wrong root for the quadratic in (2) for the case where $x^{T}y$ is negative.

Richard J. Smith has stated that Dent was the first to develop a RMA regression method for line fitting that built on the work of Robert Adcock in "A Problem in Least Squares" (1878) and Charles Kummell in "Reduction of observation equations which contain more than one observed quantity" (1879). It is now believed that she was the first to propose what is often called the geometric mean functional relationship estimator of slope, and that her essential arguments can be generalised to any number of variables. Moreover, although her solution has its theoretical limitations, it is of practical importance, as it likely represents the best a priori estimate if nothing is known about the true error distribution in the model. It is generally much less reasonable to assume that all the error, or residual scatter, is attributable to one of the variables.

=== Electrical design using digital computers ===
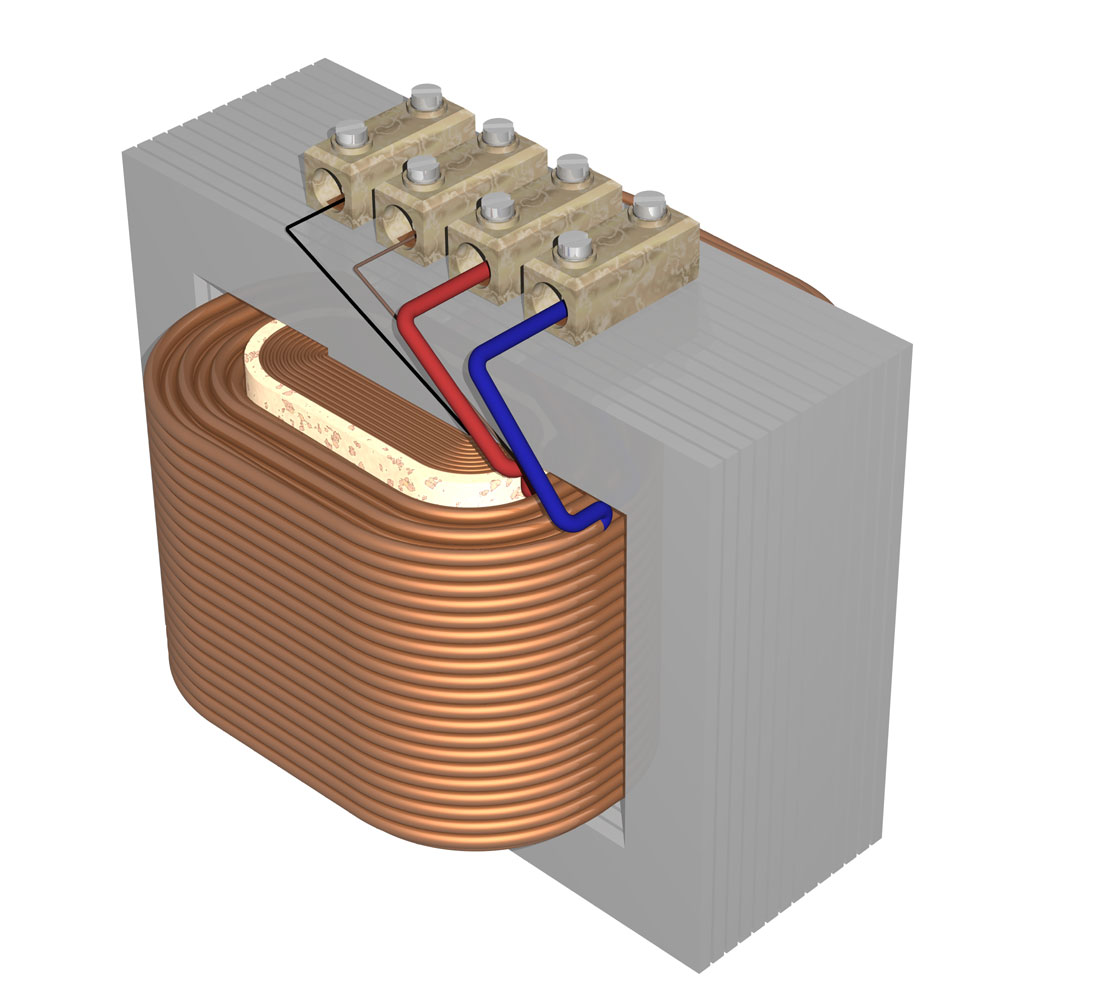
Illustration of transformer windings

In the 1950s, British electrical engineers would rarely use a digital computer, and if they did, it would be to solve some complicated equation outside the scope of analogue computers. To a certain extent, engineers were deterred by the difficulty and the time taken to program a particular problem. Furthermore, the varied and often unique problems that arise in electrical design practice, together with the degree of uncertainty of the numerical data of many problems, accentuated this tendency. On 10 April 1956, Dent and Brian Birtwistle presented their paper, "The digital computer as an aid to the electrical design engineer", to the Convention on Digital Computer Techniques at the Institution of Electrical Engineers. The paper was intended to show, by describing three relatively simple applications, that the digital computer could be a useful aid to the electrical design engineer. The three example problems were:

1. Impulse voltage distribution on transformer windings.
2. Supply frequency ripple on transductor performance.
3. Starting torque of a synchronous motor.

The Ferranti Mark 1 computer at the University of Manchester was used for the calculations in the three problems. Dent was allowed to use the university's library of subroutines, from which the following were taken and incorporated into the programs:

- Input of instructions.
- Input of numerical data in decimal form.
- Output of results in decimal digits and tabular form.
- Mathematical functions.
  - Exponential.
  - Sine and cosine.
  - Square root.
  - Solution of simultaneous equations.
  - Inversion of matrices.
  - Integration of differential equations by Runge–Kutta methods.

The first problem of calculating the impulse voltage distribution on transformer windings took about five hours of machine time. Conversely, a hand calculation, using a method described by Thomas John Lewis in "The Transient Behaviour of Ladder Networks of the Type Representing Transformer and Machine Windings" (1954), took around three months. The use of a computer in the second problem allowed for a more accurate solution as it was possible to include nonlinear magnetic characteristics in the calculation. In the last problem, the torque and speed curves for the synchronous motors were calculated in around fifteen minutes. Their paper was one of the first to recognise that high-speed digital computers could provide considerable assistance to the electrical design engineer by carrying out automatically the optimum design of products.

Significant research had been devoted to determining a transformer's internal transient voltage distribution. Early attempts were hampered by computational limitations encountered when solving large numbers of coupled differential equations with analogue computers. It was not until Dent, with Hartill and Miles, in "A method of analysis of transformer impulse voltage distribution using a digital computer" (1958), recognised the limitations of the analogue models and developed a digital computer model, and associated program, where non-uniformity in the transformer windings could be introduced and any input voltage applied.

== Publications ==
=== Selected papers and academic articles ===
Table of selected papers and academic articles
Year	Title	Co-author(s)	Notes
1926	The forces between atoms and ions. II	John Edward Lennard‑Jones	Extends earlier results to provide a complete table of forces between the monovalent and divalent ions of the inert gases. The paper was presented to the Royal Society of Chemistry on 24 June 1926 at Burlington House, the society's headquarters in Piccadilly, London.
1927	Some theoretical determinations of crystal structure	Dent (sole author)	Dent's MSc thesis. It formed the basis of the three papers published in 1927.
1927	Some theoretical determinations of the structure of carbonate crystals. I	John Edward Lennard‑Jones and Sydney Chapman	Test tube with a sample of brown-red Ferrous carbonate Discusses the structure of the carbonate anion CO^{2−}_{3}, a polyatomic ion, in iron(II) carbonate FeCO_{3}, or ferrous carbonate. The paper was refereed for the Royal Society by William Lawrence Bragg in November 1926.
1927	Some theoretical determinations of the structure of carbonate crystals. II	John Edward Lennard‑Jones and Sydney Chapman	Discusses the work required to separate iron(II) carbonate into its constituent iron(II) cations Fe^{2+} and carbonate anion.
1927	Some theoretical determinations of crystal parameters. CXVI	John Edward Lennard‑Jones	Simple cubic Body-centred cubic Face-centred cubic Comparison of crystal cubic lattice structures The surface plane of a face-centred cubic lattice was derived by Lennard‑Jones and Dent and this result has been used extensively in physisorption studies. They simplified the calculation of the Lennard-Jones potential by noting that the ions under study were isoelectronic with inert gas atoms, and thus, there was no need to introduce additional empirical L‑J parameters into the equation. In rock-salt or sodium chloride (halite) structure, each of the two atom types forms a separate face-centred cubic lattice. Examples of compounds with this structure include sodium chloride itself, along with the other alkali halides, and divalent metal oxides, sulphides, selenides, and tellurides.
1928	Cohesion at a crystal surface	John Edward Lennard‑Jones	Calculation of the surface energy of solids. Shows that for an ionic substrate a charged particle would be most strongly adsorbed, but that the electrostatic forces were very short range, and for greater distances, were smaller than the van der Waals' forces. A dipole would be adsorbed in the same manner as a charged particle but much less strongly. They conclude that the Van der Waals attraction between the atoms arises because each is polarised in the presence of others, and the temporary distortion of the electron shells gives rise to an attraction.
1928	The change in lattice spacing at a crystal boundary	John Edward Lennard‑Jones and Sydney Chapman	Shows that when alkali metal halide crystals are put under tension along their length, they suffer a lateral contraction of the order of 6 per cent.
1929	The effect of boundary distortion on the surface energy of a crystal. LV	Dent (sole author)	The effect of polarisation of surface ions in decreasing surface energy of the alkali halide crystals is studied. It is shown that for a series of alkali halide crystals, it is the deformability of the surface ions which largely controls the distortion at the surface. In general, close-packing and wide inter-planar spacing tend to lower the free surface energy in crystals.
1933	The technical news bulletin and house journal of the Metropolitan-Vickers Electrical Company	Dent (sole author)	The conference was held at the Wills Hall, University of Bristol There were eight contributors to the subject "the preparation and production of information bulletins, house journals and reports", which was presented at the general session of the tenth annual conference of the ASLIB on the morning of the 23 June 1933 in the Wills Hall, University of Bristol. James George Pearce, Dent's former technical director at Metropolitan-Vickers, was in the chair. Dent described the technical news bulletin and the house journal of Metropolitan-Vickers. The bulletins and journals contained references to current literature, abstracts, news of current interest, and select bibliographies. They were often duplicated owing to the prohibitive cost of printing: "Don't press the printers" was the advice of Dent.
1935	On observations of points connected by a linear relation	Dent (sole author)	Dent was the first to describe and develop a detailed reduced major axis method for line fitting. The paper was received by the Physical Society on 10 July 1934, and was sent by Henry Ronald Hassé, Dent's former professor of applied mathematics at Bristol. The paper was refereed by Alexander Aitken, and at the time of publication, commented on by William Edwards Deming.
1941	Works libraries and the war effort	Dent (sole author)	Dent wrote on the importance of providing facilities to distribute technical literature during a war.
1946	The library and information service of the Metropolitan-Vickers Co. Ltd	James Steele Park Paton	Describes the information service developed during the last thirty years to meet the needs of the research department at the Metropolitan-Vickers Electrical Company. In response to a request from the senior staff, a weekly "Industrial Digest" was produced from 1945. The digest contained about fifty brief abstracts on factory processes and workshop practice.
1946	What the industrialist expects of an information service	Sir Arthur Fleming	The Polytechnic (now the University of Westminster) on Regent Street, where Dent and Fleming presented at the twenty-first annual conference of ASLIB On 14 September 1946, Dent and Fleming presented at the twenty-first annual conference of ASLIB in the Fyvie Hall at the Polytechnic, Regent Street. They stressed the importance of new knowledge and ideas in industry as a condition of progress, and that industry required rapid, accurate, and comprehensive information.
1956	The digital computer as an aid to the electrical design engineer	Brian Birtwistle	The value of the digital computer as an aid to the electrical design engineer is discussed in the light of the authors' extensive use of the Ferranti Mark 1 computer. (Note: See also the history of the transistor computer.) Three examples are described: 1. Impulse voltage distribution on transformer windings. (Note: See the 1958 paper, "A method of analysis of transformer impulse voltage distribution using a digital computer".); 2. Supply frequency ripple on transductor performance.; 3. Starting torque of a synchronous motor.
1956	The authors' replies to the discussion on 'Engineering and scientific applications of digital computers'	Brian Birtwistle	Replies to questions on "The digital computer as an aid to the electrical design engineer" (1956). Douglas Hartree suggests using an extension of Numerov's method to reduce the time taken to solve the second-order differential equations. Dent and Robinson also support Robert Kenneth Livesley's recommendation that engineering courses should take into account modern developments with regard to the application of digital computers to engineering practice.
1957	Opportunities in the Metropolitan‑Vickers Electrical Company's research department for girls of good scientific education	Dent (sole author)	Dent advertises work for girls in the Metropolitan-Vickers research laboratories. She concedes that the applicant might resign before arguing that it is nevertheless a good idea to apply. The article was first published in Careers: A memorandum on openings and trainings for girls and women (1955) by the Women's Employment Federation.
1958	Analysis of transformer impulse voltages by digital computer	Eric Raymond Hartill and James George Miles	A review of "A method of analysis of transformer impulse voltage distribution using a digital computer" (1958) after it was published as an individual paper in December 1957 and republished in Part A, Power Engineering, Proceedings of the Institution of Electrical Engineers. Hartill and Miles also worked at Metropolitan-Vickers. (Note: James George Miles served in the electrical branch of the Royal Naval Reserve, before studying at Brighton Technical College, graduating in 1948. After a college apprenticeship with Metropolitan-Vickers, he joined their staff at Manchester. He was awarded an Associated Electrical Industries Fellowship in 1950, and spent one year studying power‑system analysis with British Thomson-Houston, before returning to Manchester.)
1958	A method of analysis of transformer impulse voltage distribution using a digital computer	Eric Raymond Hartill and James George Miles	The paper presents a method of impulse voltage calculation in which non-uniformity in the transformer windings could be introduced and input voltage applied. The derivation of the transformer circuit is discussed, together with a digital computer program for the solution of the resulting differential equations.

=== Publications detail ===
==== Dent ====
- Dent, Beryl May (1927). Some theoretical determinations of crystal structure (MSc). Bristol: University of Bristol Physics Library. pp. 25, 13 leaves. OCLC 931574568. DM1961.
- — (1 October 1929). "The effect of boundary distortion on the surface energy of a crystal. LV". Philosophical Magazine and Journal of Science. 7th. 8 (51). London: Taylor & Francis: 530–539. doi:10.1080/14786441008564909. ISSN 1941-5982. "Communicated by J. E. Lennard‑Jones."
- — (January 1933). "The technical news bulletin and house journal of the Metropolitan‑Vickers Electrical Company". Report of Proceedings. 10th Conference. 10. London: ASLIB: 56–58. OCLC 756380193.
- — (1 January 1935). "On observations of points connected by a linear relation". Proceedings of the Physical Society. 47 (1). London: Physical Society of London: 92–108. Bibcode:1935PPS....47...92D. doi:10.1088/0959-5309/47/1/307. ISSN 0959-5309. "Communicated by Henry Ronald Hassé on 10 July 1934. Includes discussion by William Edwards Deming."
- — (September 1941). "Works libraries and the war effort". Industry Illustrated. 9 (9). London: Management Journals: 26, 28. OCLC 33433094. "Includes Works Management, then the official journal of the Works Management Association."
- — (1955). Careers: A memorandum on openings and trainings for girls and women (17th ed.). London: Women's Employment Federation. OCLC 30187377. British Library 013988952.
- — (1957). Cowper-Coles, Constance Hamilton (ed.). "Opportunities in the Metropolitan‑Vickers Electrical Company's research repartment for girls of good scientific education". The Woman Engineer. Autumn 1957. 8 (6). London: Women's Engineering Society: 9–12. ISSN 0043-7298. Archived from the original on 21 November 2022 – via Institution of Engineering and Technology. "Pages 151 to 154 in volume."

==== Birtwistle ====
- Birtwistle, Brian; — (April 1956). "The digital computer as an aid to the electrical design engineer". Proceedings of the Institution of Electrical Engineers. Part B. Radio and Electronic Engineering. 103 (1S). London: Institution of Electrical Engineers: 47–53. doi:10.1049/pi-b-1.1956.0008. ISSN 2054-0434. Paper No. 2092 M. "The paper was first received 30 January 1956, and in revised form, 5 March 1956. It was published in March 1956 and was read at the Convention on Digital‑Computer Techniques on 10 April 1956."
- —; — (April 1956). "The authors' replies to the discussion on 'Engineering and scientific applications of digital computers'" (PDF). Proceedings of the Institution of Electrical Engineers. Part B. Radio and Electronic Engineering. 103 (1S). London: Institution of Electrical Engineers: 82–83. doi:10.1049/pi-b-1.1956.0013. ISSN 2054-0434 – via Institution of Engineering and Technology.

==== Fleming ====
- Fleming, Arthur; — (September 1946). Sanger, Margaret (ed.). "What the industrialist expects of an information service". Report of Proceedings. 21st Conference. 21. London: ASLIB: 47–56. OCLC 652436848. "Held at Fyrie Hall, the Polytechnic, London, 14 to 15 September 1946."
- —; — (5 October 1946). Gale, Arthur James Victor (ed.). "Association of Special Libraries and Information Bureaux. Annual Conference" (PDF). Nature. 158 (4014). London: Nature Portfolio: 491–492. doi:10.1038/158490b0. ISSN 1476-4687. S2CID 4099552.

==== Hartill and Miles ====
- —; Hartill, Eric Raymond; Miles, James George (1 May 1958). "Analysis of transformer impulse voltages by digital computer". Proceedings of the Institution of Electrical Engineers. 4 (41). London: Institution of Electrical Engineers: 259–261. doi:10.1049/jiee-3.1958.0116. ISSN 2054-0612.
- —; —; — (October 1958) [First published December 1957]. "A method of analysis of transformer impulse voltage distribution using a digital computer". Proceedings of the Institution of Electrical Engineers. Part A. Power Engineering. 105 (23). London: Institution of Electrical Engineers: 445–459. doi:10.1049/pi-a.1958.0080. ISSN 2054-040X.

==== Lennard‑Jones ====
- Lennard‑Jones, John Edward; — (3 August 1926). "The forces between atoms and ions. II". Proceedings of the Royal Society. Series A. Containing Papers of a Mathematical and Physical Character. 112 (760). London: Royal Society: 230–234. Bibcode:1926RSPSA.112..230L. doi:10.1098/rspa.1926.0107. ISSN 0950-1207. JSTOR 94629. "Communicated by Sydney Chapman. Received 8 June 1926."
- —; — (1 May 1927). "Some theoretical determinations of crystal parameters. CXVI". Philosophical Magazine and Journal of Science. 3 (18). London: Taylor & Francis: 1204–1227. doi:10.1080/14786440508564290. ISSN 1941-5982.
- —; — (1928). "Cohesion at a crystal surface". Transactions of the Faraday Society. 24. London: Faraday Society: 92–108. doi:10.1039/tf9282400092. ISSN 0014-7672. "Received 10 November 1927."

==== Lennard‑Jones and Chapman ====
- Lennard‑Jones, John Edward; —; Chapman, Sydney (1 January 1927). "Some theoretical determinations of the structure of carbonate crystals. I". Proceedings of the Royal Society. Series A. Containing Papers of a Mathematical and Physical Character. 113 (765). London: Royal Society: 673–689. Bibcode:1927RSPSA.113..673L. doi:10.1098/rspa.1927.0015. ISSN 0950-1207. JSTOR 94649. "Received 3 November 1926. Chapman provided the calculation of the electrostatic potential energy of an infinite array of electrical charges distributed according to the scheme determined by X‑ray analysis."
- —; —; — (1 January 1927). "Some theoretical determinations of the structure of carbonate crystals. II". Proceedings of the Royal Society. Series A. Containing Papers of a Mathematical and Physical Character. 113 (765). London: Royal Society: 690–696. Bibcode:1927RSPSA.113..690L. doi:10.1098/rspa.1927.0016. ISSN 2053-9150. JSTOR 94650. "Received 17 November 1926."
- —; —; — (1 November 1928). "The change in lattice spacing at a crystal boundary". Proceedings of the Royal Society. Series A. Containing Papers of a Mathematical and Physical Character. 121 (787). London: Royal Society: 247–259. Bibcode:1928RSPSA.121..247L. doi:10.1098/rspa.1928.0194. ISSN 2053-9150. JSTOR 95072.

==== Paton ====
- —; Paton, James Steele Park (1946). "The library and information service of the Metropolitan‑Vickers Co. Ltd". Manchester Review. Public Library Review Autumn. 4. Libraries Committee, City Council. Manchester: Manchester Public Libraries: 236–238. ISSN 0025-2026. OCLC 1014381852.

==== As contributing mathematician and programmer ====
- Bailey, Richard William (1952). "II. Stresses in Gas‑Turbine Discs and Rotors". A Symposium on High‑temperature Steels and Alloys for Gas Turbines. Special Report No. 43. London: Iron and Steel Institute. pp. 30–35. OCLC 911840680. "Held in the Great Hall of the Institution of Civil Engineers, London, 21 to 22 February 1951."
- Barden, Stanley Edgar (June 1954). "Regenerative Deflection as a Parametrically Excited Resonance Phenomenon". Review of Scientific Instruments. 25 (6). Melville: American Institute of Physics: 587–593. Bibcode:1954RScI...25..587B. doi:10.1063/1.1771137. ISSN 0034-6748. OSTI 4412345. "Received 17 June 1952."
- Edwards, John Charles Manson; Gill, Samuel Sidney; Perkins, Stanley (December 1958). "A Method of Calculating the Deflection of the Graphite Support Grid for a Gas Cooled Reactor". Civil Engineering and Public Works Review. 53 (630). London: Lomax, Erskine & Company: 1400–1402. ISSN 0009-7861. OCLC 220831595.
- Gradwell, Cyril Frederick (1 July 1950). "Asymmetrical Bending of Tapered Disks: The Solution of a problem in disk bending occurring in connexion with gas turbines". Aircraft Engineering and Aerospace Technology. 22 (7). Bradford: Emerald Group Publishing: 209–212. Bibcode:1950AEAT...22..209G. doi:10.1108/eb031926. ISSN 0002-2667.
- Hartill, Eric Raymond (April 1959). "The Zeta Transformer and Auxiliary Circuit Equipment". Journal of the Institution of Electrical Engineers. Part A: Power Engineering. 106 (2S). London: Institution of Electrical Engineers: 66–73. doi:10.1049/pi-a.1959.0010. ISSN 0369-8882. "Paper No. 2876. The paper was received 7 January 1959. It was presented at the Convention on Thermonuclear Process on 29 April 1959"
- Myers, David Milton; Hartree, Douglas Rayner; Porter, Arthur (1937). "The Effect of Space‑Charge on the Secondary Current in a Triode". Proceedings of the Royal Society. A, Mathematical and Physical Sciences. 158 (893). London: Royal Society: 23–37. Bibcode:1937RSPSA.158...23M. doi:10.1098/rspa.1937.0002. ISSN 0080-4630. JSTOR 96742.
- Stuckes, Audrey Doris (July 1953). "Electro‑Thermal Behaviour of Point Contacts to Semiconductors". Proceedings of the Physical Society. Section B. 66 (7). London: Physical Society of London: 570–587. Bibcode:1953PPSB...66..570S. doi:10.1088/0370-1301/66/7/306. ISSN 0370-1301. "Communicated by Brian Andrew Graham Churcher. Manuscript received 9 January 1953, and in final form, 9 April 1953."

== See also ==
- Arthur Fleming
- Ferranti Mark 1
- Isabel Hardwich
- Metropolitan-Vickers
- Cecil Frank Powell and Herbert Wakefield Banks Skinner – colleagues of Dent at the Wills Physical Laboratory, Bristol, in the late 1920s
- University of Bristol

== Bibliography ==
- Adcock, Robert James (March 1878). Hendricks, Joel Evans (ed.). "A Problem in Least Squares". The Analyst. 5 (2). Princeton: Princeton University: 53–54. doi:10.2307/2635758. hdl:2027/njp.32101040986372. ISSN 0741-7918. JSTOR 2635758. OCLC 277641453.
- Cleveland, Jason Paul; Radmacher, Manfred; Hansma, Paul Kenneth (September 1994). "Atomic Scale Force Mapping with the Atomic Force Microscope". Applied Sciences. NATO Advanced Study Institute: Series E. 286. Office of Naval Research. Santa Barbara: UC Santa Barbara Physics Department: 1–7. ISSN 0304-9930. OCLC 200640681. Technical Report No. 13. Defense Technical Information Center ADA284940.
- Excell, Phyl; Excell, Stanley (September 1979). "Monumental Inscriptions at Sompting Parish Church". Sussex Family Historian. September 1979 to December 1981. Vol. 4, no. 3. Brighton: Sussex Family History Group. pp. 84–85. ISSN 0260-4175. OCLC 3114152.
- Kummell, Charles Hugo (July 1879). Hendricks, Joel Evans (ed.). "Reduction of observation equations which contain more than one observed quantity". The Analyst. 6 (4). Princeton: Princeton University: 97–105. Bibcode:1879Ana.....6...97K. doi:10.2307/2635646. hdl:2027/hvd.32044102938057. ISSN 0741-7918. JSTOR 2635646. OCLC 277641453.
- Lewis, Thomas John (October 1954). "The Transient Behaviour of Ladder Networks of the Type Representing Transformer and Machine Windings". Proceedings of the Institution of Electrical Engineers. Part II: Power Engineering. 101 (83). London: Institution of Electrical Engineers: 541–553. doi:10.1049/pi-2.1954.0114. ISSN 0369-8939. Paper No. 1691 Supply Section M. "The paper was first received 24 February 1954, and in revised form 21 April 1954."
- Murray, Janet Horowitz; Stark, Myra, eds. (1985). The Englishwoman's Review of Social and Industrial Questions. The complete run reproduced in facsimile in 41 volumes. January to October 1905. Vol. 36. New York: Garland Publishing. pp. 251–252. hdl:2027/umn.31951002443042e. ISBN 978-0-8240-3761-1. OCLC 13062569.
- Pollock, Philip John (August 1955). "Discussion on 'The Design of High‑Speed Salient‑Pole A.C. Generators for Water Power Plants'". Proceedings of the Institution of Electrical Engineers. Part A: Power Engineering. 102 (4). London: Institution of Electrical Engineers: 476–482. doi:10.1049/pi-2.1954.0114. ISSN 0369-8882. "North‑Western Centre, at Manchester, 6 May 1952."
