= Isaac Ware =

English architect and translator (1704–1766)

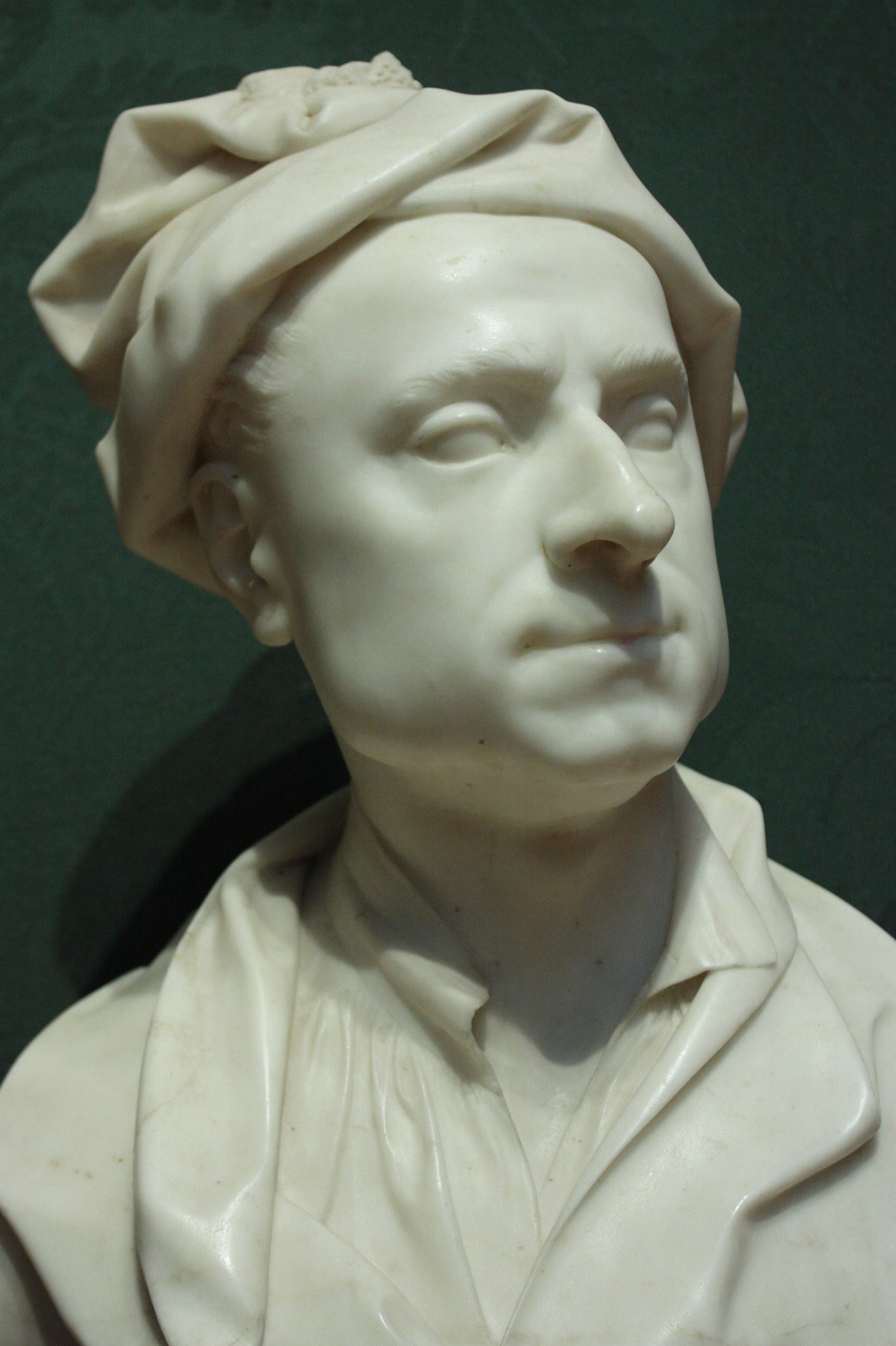
Isaac Ware by Roubiliac, 1741, National Portrait Gallery, London

Isaac Ware (1704–1766) was an English architect and translator of Italian Renaissance architect Andrea Palladio.

== Early life ==
Ware was born to a life of poverty, living as a street urchin and working as a chimney sweep, until he was adopted by Richard Boyle, 3rd Earl of Burlington at the age of eight (in about 1712) after which he was groomed and educated as a young nobleman. Reportedly he was drawing on the pavement of Whitehall whereupon Burlington, recognising the talent, intelligence and personality, took him into his own household. His subsequent education included a Grand Tour of Europe and the study of architecture. (On his deathbed the ingrained soot of the chimney-sweep was still detectable on his skin.)

== Architectural career ==
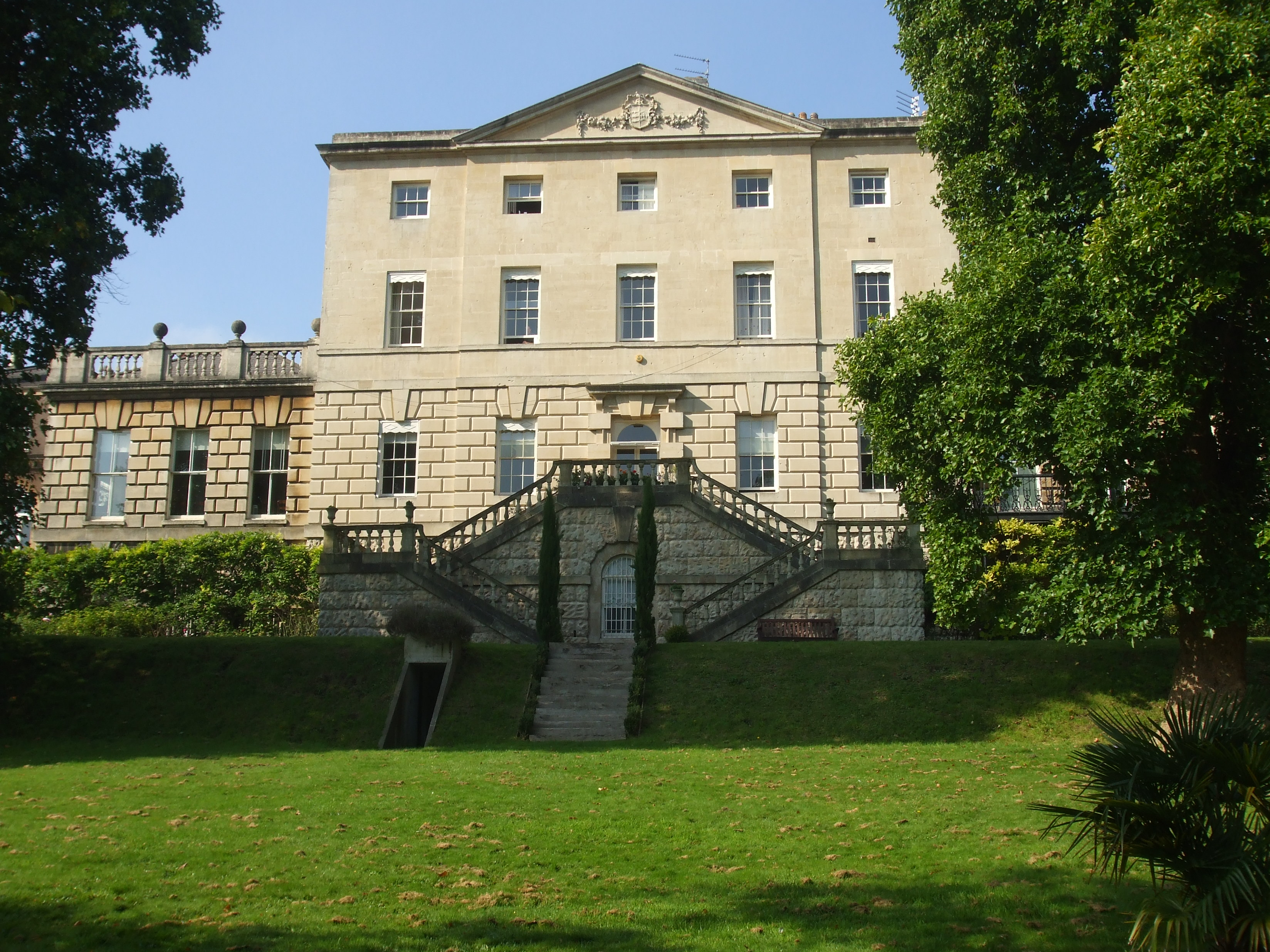
Clifton Hill House

He was apprenticed to Thomas Ripley, 1 August 1721, and followed him in positions in the Office of Works, but his mentor in design was Lord Burlington. Ware was a member of the St. Martin's Lane Academy, which brought together many of the main figures in the English Rococo movement, among them Louis François Roubiliac, who sculpted Ware's portrait bust about 1741.

Although he held various posts with the Office of Works between 1728 and his death, including Secretary, a position previously held by Nicholas Hawksmoor, Ware's major works were for private patrons. Aside from Chesterfield House, Westminster, (1747–52; demolished 1937) with its Palladian exterior and rococo interior details he built a small number of country houses, most of which have been subsequently remodelled or demolished. Clifton Hill House, Bristol, and Wrotham Park, Hertfordshire survive, Clifton Hill House, built in 1746 –50, is a Palladian villa, a type Ware also used for two houses in Scotland in the next ten years, both with service wings linked to the main house by passages. At Wrotham (1756) the central block was flanked by wings ending in octagonal pavilions. He also engaged in speculative building in the West End of London.

Ware was also involved in the completion of some elements of Leinster House following the death of Richard Cassels in 1751. In the later 1750s he was also involved in completing later alterations to the interior of the house for James FitzGerald, 1st Duke of Leinster.

Ware was dissatisfied with the first English language edition of Andrea Palladio's I Quattro Libri dell'Architettura, translated by Giacomo Leoni), and in particular with Leoni's illustrations. In 1738 Ware published his translation illustrated with his own careful engravings. Ware's version of the Four Books of Architecture remained the best English translation into the twentieth century in the opinion of Howard Colvin.

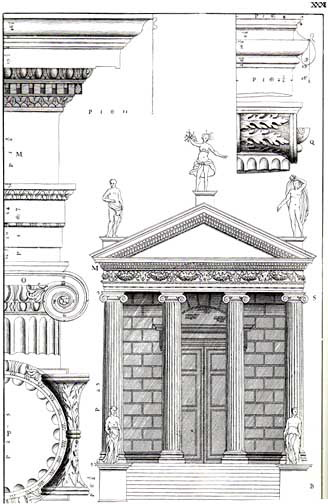
"The Temple of Fortuna Virilis" in Isaac Ware's The Four Books of Andrea Palladio's Architecture, London, 1738.

"Having thoroughly assimilated Palladian theory", wrote Colvin "he looked beyond it, and in the 1740s himself helped to dissolve the dictatorship of taste that Burlington imposed in the 1720s.", In 1756 he published A Complete Body of Architecture a wide-ranging work intended to "supply the place of all other books". It was described by John Summerson as "ably compiled, reflecting very fairly the solid, thoughtful competence of its author's executed works".

== Publications ==
The following list is taken from Colvin; all were published at London.

- Designs of Inigo Jones and others, 1731. Second edition, 1743.
- The Plans, Elevations, and Sections of Houghton in Norfolk, 1735.
- The Four Books of Andrea Palladio's Architecture 1738. Dedicated to Burlington.
- Two engravings of Rokeby Hall, Yorkshire.
- A Complete Body of Architecture, issued in parts 1756-57. Second edition, 1767, reissued in 1768.
- The Practice of Perspective, from the Original Italian of Lorenzo Sirigatti, with the figures engraved by Isaac Ware, Esq. A translation of Sirigatti's, La Practica di Prospettiva (Venice, 1596).
