= Arthur Fleming (electrical engineer) =

Sir Arthur Fleming
- Born: Arthur Percy Morris Fleming; 16 January 1881; Newport, Isle of Wight
- Died: 14 September 1960 (aged 79); Bonchurch, Isle of Wight

Sir Arthur Percy Morris Fleming CBE (16 January 1881 – 14 September 1960) was an English electrical engineer, researcher director, and engineering educator.

== Education and career ==
After education at Portland House Academy in Newport and at Finsbury Technical College in London, Fleming worked for the London Electric Supply Corporation and then for Elliott Brothers, Lewisham. He was selected by British Westinghouse for training as one of the 'Holy Forty' who would train with its American parent company before taking up junior posts at the British Westinghouse works in Trafford Park, Manchester. Fleming spent the years from 1899 to 1902 with Westinghouse Electric Company at its East Pittsburgh, Pennsylvania works before returning to take up a post in Trafford Park. He became an insulation specialist and then the chief transformer designer. Fleming introducing a training programme for apprentice recruits, first in the transformer department and then in 1908 throughout British Westinghouse.

British Westinghouse created in 1913 a separate transformer department with Fleming as superintendent and chief engineer, sponsored in 1914 a corporate trade apprentice school directed by him, and in 1917 made him manager of the corporate education department. During WW I, Fleming lead a research team which made important progress in electrical technology for detecting submarines. In 1919 British Westinghouse was merged into Metropolitan-Vickers.

In 1920, as a pioneer in the development of radio, he established in Manchester the second British transmitting station to broadcast programs on a daily basis.

During the 1920s Fleming played an important role in the progress of the research department of Metropolitan-Vickers.

By 1929 the department contained one of the largest high voltage laboratories in the world. The department attracted a succession of men of outstanding ability, who responded to Fleming's inspiration by making many notable contributions to pure and applied science. Particularly important was the development of demountable high power thermionic valves which helped make possible the installation of the first radar stations just before the outbreak of war in 1939.

In 1931, the holding company Associated Electrical Industries, the parent company of Metropolitan-Vickers, appointed Fleming its director of research and education. He continued in this directorship until his retirement in 1954.

After the Second World War, as Chairman of the Federation of British Industries Overseas Scholarship Committee, he led an engineering mission to Latin America and returned much impressed with the potentialities of the young republics. He also went to Canada as head of the UK Mission to Canada for the Education and Training of Engineers in 1950. Later he was made President of the British Association of Commercial and Industrial Education.

== Personal life ==
In 1904, he married Rose Mary Ash of Newport, Isle of Wight. They had two sons, Jack Morris and Gerald Morris, and one daughter, Ruth Mary.

== Awards and honours ==
- 1920 — CBE for work on technology for submarine detection
- 1924 — elected to membership of the Manchester Literary and Philosophical Society
- 1924 — Invited Speaker of the International Congress of Mathematicians in Toronto
- 1937 — Hawksley Medal awarded by the Institution of Mechanical Engineers
- 1941 — Faraday Medal awarded by the Institution of Electrical Engineers
- 1945 — Knighthood for his services to education

== Selected publications ==
- with R. Johnson: The Insulation and Design of Electrical Windings. Longmans, Green. 1913.
- with R. S. Baily: Engineering as a Profession. J. Long. 1913.
- with J. G. Pearce: The Principles of Apprentice Training. Longmans. 1916.
- with H. J. Brocklehurst: An Introduction to the Principles of Industrial Administration. Sir I. Pitman & Sons. 1922.
- with J. G. Pearce: Research in Industry. Pitman's industrial administration series. Sir I. Pitman & sons. 1922.
- with H. J. Brocklehurst: A History of Engineering. 1925.
- with Beryl May Dent What the industrialist expects of an information service.
