= Paul K. Hansma =

American physicist

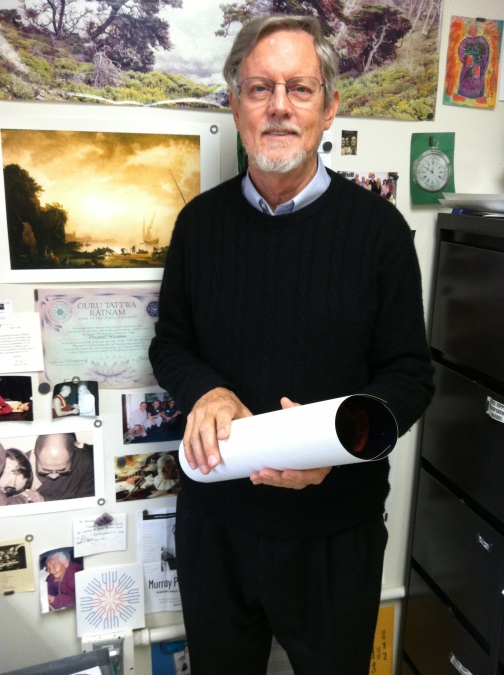
- Hansma in his office (2012)
- Born: April 28, 1946 (age 79); Salt Lake City, Utah
- Education: New College, Sarasota, Fl. Bachelor’s (1967) University of California, Berkeley Ph.D., Physics (1972)
- Alma mater: University of California, Berkeley
- Occupation: Physicist
- Known for: Atomic Force Microscope
- Website: Hansma Lab Website

Paul K. Hansma (born April 28, 1946) is an American physicist at the University of California, Santa Barbara.

== Early life and education ==
Paul K. Hansma was born in Salt Lake City, Utah. He received his undergraduate degree from New College of Florida, and his PhD in physics from the University of California, Berkeley where he studied electron tunneling and Josephson junctions.

== Career ==
Hansma became an assistant professor at the University of California, Santa Barbara in 1974. He then became an associate professor three years later. In the 1970s, Hansma began working in electron tunneling spectroscopy, and moved to STM-based experiments by the early 1980s. This included biological STM as of 1985, when he adapted his STM microscopes to work in water (previously STMs would only work in air).

Over the 1980s, Hansma worked in conjunction with IBM Zurich, researching the use of probe microscopy and its use in a variety of different fields. As a part of this work, he co-developed three scanning tunneling microscopes for the University of California, Santa Barbara. In the late 1980s, Hansma then worked on the development of atomic force microscopes and their use in research. This included the use of AFMs in genetic research, using them to observe DNA and RNA molecules in manner that did not disturb their natural interactions during the late 1990s.

In 1991, Hansma researched the process of corrosion in infrastructure and other places like car batteries, and looked at the role the type of electrolyte involved has on the corrosion’s progress. In 2005 Hansma’s discovered the existence of a biopolymer in human bones that provides a “glue” like function, correlatively strengthening or weakening the bone. Around this time he also began to develop high-speed scanning AFMs. During his research into bone glue, Hansma developed the OsteoProbe, and also spent time researching the use of natural adhesives to create optimized adhesives for other applications. He is also the developer of Reference Point Indentation, which tests bone quality. He is also the inventor of Scanning Ion Conductance Microscopy.

== Recognition ==
Hansma is the namesake of the Paul Hansma Research Group at the Department of Physics of the University of California, Santa Barbara. In 1964 he was named a Presidential Scholar by President Lyndon Johnson. He is a fellow of the American Physical Society and the American Association for the Advancement of Science, and was the 2000 recipient of the Max Delbruck Prize in Biological Physics.
