= Arthur Porter (engineer) =

British-Canadian engineer

Arthur Porter (1910–2010) was a British-Canadian engineer and pioneer in computing and biomedical engineering.

Porter was born in Ulverston, England, on 8 December 1910, the son of John William Porter and Mary Anne Harris.

He studied at the University of Manchester where he gained undergraduate (BSc) honours in physics followed by an MSc. He went on to obtain his doctorate (PhD) at Manchester under the supervision of Douglas Hartree). His graduate work and doctoral thesis was on a differential analyser (early analog computer) constructed from Meccano parts.

He spent the period from 1937 to 1939 on a Commonwealth Fund Fellowship at the Massachusetts Institute of Technology. This was followed by wartime research with the Admiralty Research Laboratory and the National Physical Laboratory. After the war, he was Professor of Instrument Technology at Royal Military College (1946–1949).

Porter then moved to Canada where he was Head of Research at Ferranti Ltd in Toronto from 1949 to 1955. He then returned to London to take up the post of Professor of Electrical Engineering at Imperial College London from 1955 to 1958. Following this, he was Dean at the University of Saskatchewan (1958–1961), followed by two periods as Professor of Industrial Engineering at the University of Toronto (1961–1968 and 1973–1975). During his career, his colleagues included Douglas Hartree and Marshall McLuhan.

Porter was a member of Project Lamplight in the 1950s. Other posts he held included Chair of the Royal Commission on Government Organization (The Glassco Commission, 1960–1962), Academic Commissioner at the University of Western Ontario (1970–1972), Chair of the Science Committee of the Ontario Science Centre, Chair of the Canadian Environmental Council, and Chair of the Ontario Royal Commission on Electric Power Planning. He also chaired the science advisory committee for Expo 67, the World's Fair held in 1967 in Montreal.

Honours conferred on Porter include the Canadian Centennial Medal (1967) and the Order of Canada (1988). He was made a Fellow of the Royal Society of Canada in 1970. Porter became a US citizen in 1995. He was hospitalised following a stroke and died at Forsyth Memorial Hospital, Winston-Salem, North Carolina, on 26 February 2010. Porter was inducted into the Canadian Science and Engineering Hall of Fame in 2013.

== Publications ==
- Cybernetics Simplified (1969)
- The Report of the Royal Commission on Electric Power Planning (1980, 9 vols.)
- So Many Hills to Climb: My Journey from Cumbria to North Carolina (2004)
