= Numerov's method =

Numerical method

Numerov's method (also called Cowell's method) is a numerical method to solve ordinary differential equations of second order in which the first-order term does not appear. It is a fourth-order linear multistep method. The method is implicit, but can be made explicit if the differential equation is linear.

Numerov's method was developed by the Russian astronomer Boris Vasil'evich Numerov.

== The method ==
The Numerov method can be used to solve differential equations of the form

$$\frac{d^2 y}{dx^2} = - g(x) y(x) + s(x).$$

In it, three values of $y_{n-1}, y_n, y_{n+1}$ taken at three equidistant points $x_{n-1}, x_n, x_{n+1}$ are related as follows:

$$y_{n+1} \left(1 + \frac{h^2}{12} g_{n+1}\right) = 2 y_n \left(1 - \frac{5 h^2}{12} g_n\right) - y_{n-1} \left(1 + \frac{h^2}{12} g_{n-1}\right) + \frac{h^2}{12} (s_{n+1} + 10 s_n + s_{n-1}) + \mathcal{O}(h^6),$$

where $y_n = y(x_n)$, $g_n = g(x_n)$, $s_n = s(x_n)$, and $h = x_{n+1} - x_n$.

=== Nonlinear equations ===
For nonlinear equations of the form

$$\frac{d^2 y}{dx^2} = f(x,y),$$

the method gives

$$y_{n+1} - 2 y_n + y_{n-1} = \frac{h^2}{12} (f_{n+1} + 10 f_n + f_{n-1}) + \mathcal{O} (h^6).$$

This is an implicit linear multistep method, which reduces to the explicit method given above if $f$ is linear in $y$ by setting $f(x,y) = - g(x) y(x) + s(x)$. It achieves order-4 accuracy (Hairer, Nørsett & Wanner 1993, §III.10).

== Application ==
In numerical physics the method is used to find solutions of the unidimensional Schrödinger equation for arbitrary potentials. An example of which is solving the radial equation for a spherically symmetric potential. In this example, after separating the variables and analytically solving the angular equation, we are left with the following equation of the radial function $R(r)$:

$$\frac{d}{dr} \left(r^2 \frac{dR}{dr} \right) - \frac{2 m r^2}{\hbar^2} (V(r) - E) R(r) = l (l + 1) R(r).$$

This equation can be reduced to the form necessary for the application of Numerov's method with the following substitution:

$$u(r) = r R(r) \Rightarrow R(r) = \frac{u(r)}{r},$$
$$\frac{dR}{dr} = \frac{1}{r} \frac{du}{dr} - \frac{u(r)}{r^2} = \frac{1}{r^2} \left (r \frac{du}{dr} - u(r) \right) \Rightarrow \frac{d}{dr} \left(r^2 \frac{dR}{dr} \right) = \frac{du}{dr} + r \frac{d^2 u}{dr^2} - \frac{du}{dr} = r \frac{d^2 u}{dr^2}.$$

And when we make the substitution, the radial equation becomes

$$r \frac{d^2 u}{dr^2} - \frac{2 m r}{\hbar^2} (V(r) - E) u(r) = \frac{l (l + 1)}{r} u(r),$$

or

$$-\frac{\hbar^2}{2 m} \frac{d^2 u}{dr^2} + \left(V(r) + \frac{\hbar^2}{2 m} \frac{l (l + 1)}{r^2} \right) u(r) = E u(r),$$

which is equivalent to the one-dimensional Schrödinger equation, but with the modified effective potential

$$V_\text{eff}(r) = V(r) + \frac{\hbar^2}{2 m} \frac{l (l + 1)}{r^2} = V(r) + \frac{L^2}{2 m r^2}, \quad L^2 = l (l + 1) \hbar^2.$$

This equation we can proceed to solve the same way we would have solved the one-dimensional Schrödinger equation. We can rewrite the equation a little bit differently and thus see the possible application of Numerov's method more clearly:

$$\frac{d^2 u}{dr^2} = - \frac{2 m}{\hbar^2} (E - V_\text{eff}(r)) u(r),$$

$$g(r) = \frac{2 m}{\hbar^2} (E - V_\text{eff}(r)),$$

$$s(r) = 0.$$

== Derivation ==
We are given the differential equation

$$y''(x) = - g(x) y(x) + s(x).$$

To derive the Numerov's method for solving this equation, we begin with the Taylor expansion of the function we want to solve, $y(x)$, around the point $x_0$:

$$y(x) = y(x_0) + (x-x_0)y'(x_0) + \frac{(x-x_0)^2}{2!}y''(x_0) + \frac{(x-x_0)^3}{3!}y'''(x_0) + \frac{(x-x_0)^4}{4!}y''''(x_0) + \frac{(x-x_0)^5}{5!}y'''''(x_0) + \mathcal{O}(h^6).$$

Denoting the distance from $x$ to $x_0$ by $h = x - x_0$, we can write the above equation as

$$y(x_0 + h) = y(x_0) + hy'(x_0) + \frac{h^2}{2!}y''(x_0) + \frac{h^3}{3!}y'''(x_0) + \frac{h^4}{4!}y''''(x_0) + \frac{h^5}{5!}y'''''(x_0) + \mathcal{O}(h^6).$$

If we evenly discretize the space, we get a grid of $x$ points, where $h = x_{n+1} - x_n$. By applying the above equations to this discrete space, we get a relation between the $y_n$ and $y_{n+1}$:

$$y_{n+1} = y_n + hy'(x_n) + \frac{h^2}{2!}y''(x_n) + \frac{h^3}{3!}y'''(x_n) + \frac{h^4}{4!}y''''(x_n) + \frac{h^5}{5!}y'''''(x_n) + \mathcal{O}(h^6).$$

Computationally, this amounts to taking a step forward by an amount $h$. If we want to take a step backwards, we replace every $h$ with $- h$ and get the expression for $y_{n-1}$:

$$y_{n-1} = y_n - hy'(x_n) + \frac{h^2}{2!}y''(x_n) - \frac{h^3}{3!}y'''(x_n) + \frac{h^4}{4!}y''''(x_n) - \frac{h^5}{5!}y'''''(x_n) + \mathcal{O}(h^6).$$

Note that only the odd powers of $h$ experienced a sign change. By summing the two equations, we derive that

$$y_{n+1} - 2 y_n + y_{n-1} = h^2 y''_n + \frac{h^4}{12}y''''_n + \mathcal{O}(h^6).$$

We can solve this equation for $y_{n+1}$ by substituting the expression given at the beginning, that is $y''_n = - g_n y_n + s_n$. To get an expression for the $y''''_n$ factor, we simply have to differentiate $y''_n = - g_n y_n + s_n$ twice and approximate it again in the same way we did this above:

$$y''''_n = \frac{d^2}{d x^2} (-g_n y_n + s_n),$$
$$h^2 y''''_n = -g_{n+1} y_{n+1} + s_{n+1} + 2 g_n y_n - 2 s_n - g_{n-1} y_{n-1} + s_{n-1} + \mathcal{O}(h^4).$$

If we now substitute this to the preceding equation, we get

$$y_{n+1} - 2 y_n + y_{n-1} = {h^2} (- g_n y_n + s_n) + \frac{h^2}{12} (- g_{n+1} y_{n+1} + s_{n+1} + 2 g_n y_n - 2 s_n - g_{n-1} y_{n-1} + s_{n-1}) + \mathcal{O}(h^6),$$

or

$$y_{n+1} \left(1 + \frac{h^2}{12} g_{n+1} \right) - 2 y_n \left(1 - \frac{5 h^2}{12} g_n \right) + y_{n-1} \left(1 + \frac{h^2}{12} g_{n-1} \right) = \frac{h^2}{12} (s_{n+1} + 10 s_n + s_{n-1}) + \mathcal{O}(h^6).$$

This yields the Numerov's method if we ignore the term of order $h^6$. It follows that the order of convergence (assuming stability) is 4.
