= May Staveley =

- Born: 14 May 1863; Wisbech
- Died: 20 December 1934 (aged 71); Clifton Hill House
- Education: Somerville College, Oxford

May Christophera Staveley (14 May 1863 – 20 December 1934) was a British university teacher who created the first university hall of residence that allowed women from outside Bristol to study at the university. She became the warden.

== Life ==
Staveley was born in Wisbech in 1863 to Eastland and Ann Stavely. She was the fourth daughter and despite being largely home educated she went to study modern history at Somerville College, Oxford at the age of 32.

From Somerville she went to Birmingham to become the first warden of its women's university settlement. In 1905 she became head of the women's hall of residence, at Liverpool University, and lecturer in history there. In 1907 she moved to Bristol University as lecturer in history and tutor to women students. She also became president of the Bristol branch of the International Federation of University Women.

Staveley persuaded Bristol University to purchase Clifton Hill House, assisted by her supporters from the Symonds family in 1909, in order to create the first hall of residence for women in south-west England. This house had been home to the nineteenth century 'man-of-letters', John Addington Symonds, whose father had bought the house in 1851.

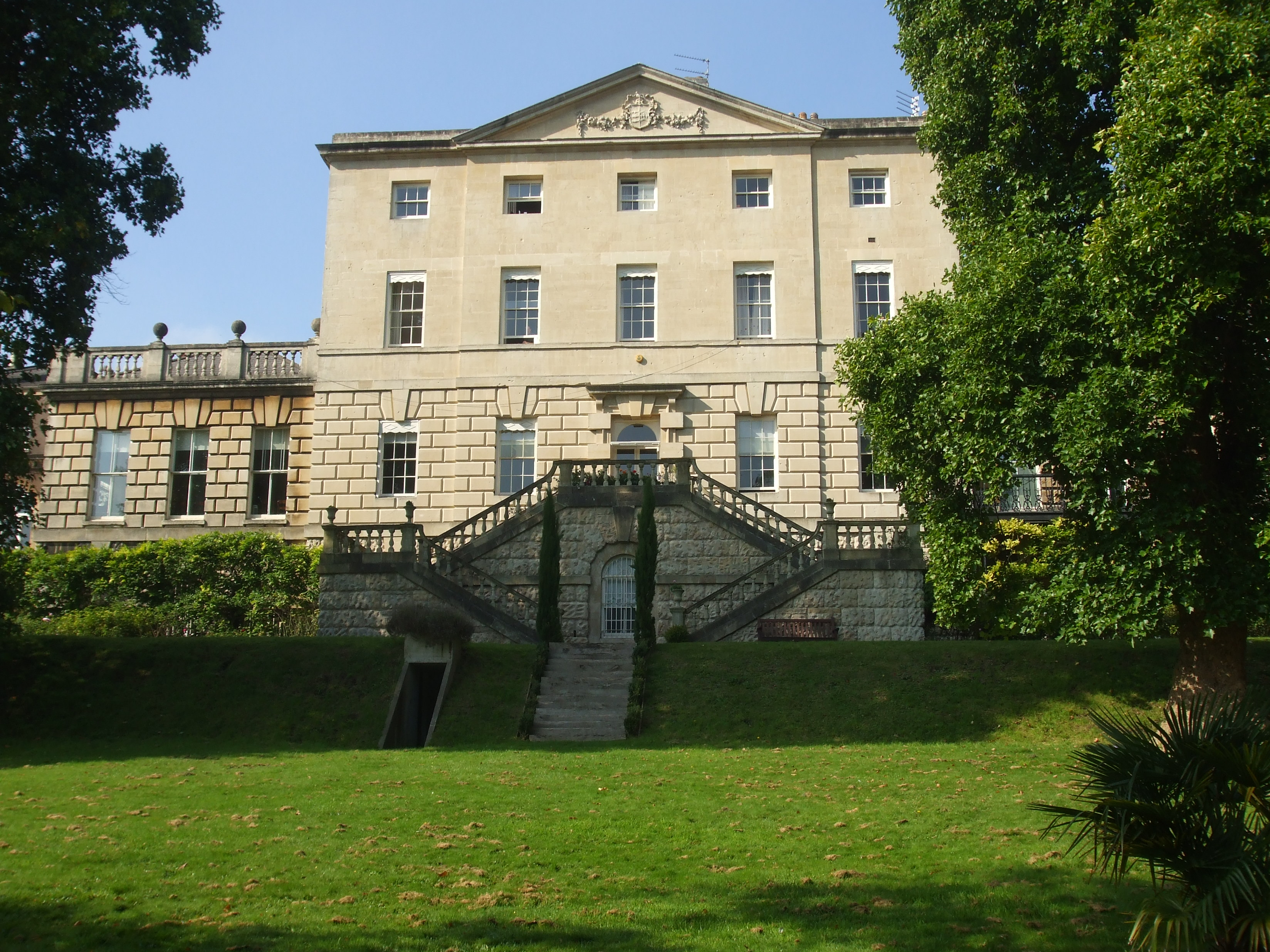
Clifton Hill House

In 1911, the university took over the running of the house and they bought the adjacent Callandar House, which dates from the late 18th century and is itself grade II listed. During the war Staveley was honorary secretary of her university's Women's War Work Fund. She had worked in France during the summer in France for the Quakers before the war and now the Fund organised a hostel for refugees from Belgium.

Callandar House was extended in the 1920s thanks to the Wills family (regular benefactors to the university) and, along with Old Clifton, continued to house only female residents.

Staveley died at Clifton Hill House in 1934. Her popularity was such that the Quaker funeral was held on a Saturday to allow university staff and students to attend.
