= Clifton Hill House =

Historic country house in Bristol, England

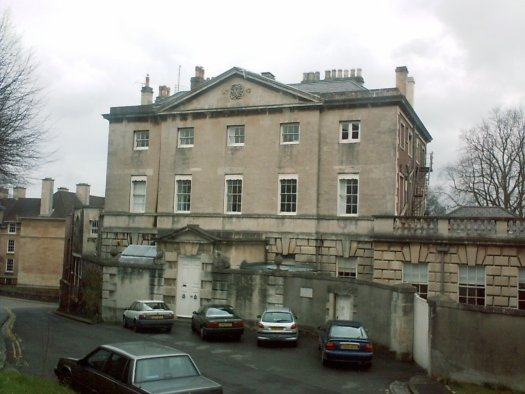
- Clifton Hill House

General information
- Architectural style: Palladian
- Location: Bristol, England
- Construction started: 1746
- Completed: 1750
- Client: Paul Fisher

Technical details
- Size: 250 student rooms

Design and construction
- Architect: Isaac Ware

Clifton Hill House is a Grade I listed Palladian villa in the Clifton area of Bristol, England. It was the first hall of residence for women in south-west England in 1909 due to the efforts of May Staveley. It is still used as a hall of residence by the University of Bristol.

== History ==
The house was built between 1746 and 1750 for the wealthy merchant and philanthropist Paul Fisher, by Isaac Ware, a nationally renowned architect and translator of Palladio's works. Thomas Paty, later a notable Bristol architect, worked as a mason during its construction. The house stands on a steep slope, so that while only three stories face the street, the five-bay garden front is four stories tall with low wings (both raised from one story to two during the nineteenth century) and a double flight of steps down to the garden. There is a World War II Air raid shelter accessible beneath the steps which is visible from the South Façade. Before 1850, the far end of the garden was sold and built into the Bellevue terrace.

Original rococo plasterwork, by Joseph Thomas, survives in a number of interior rooms. The Symonds Music Room, which adjoins the Drawing Room, was constructed in the 1850s and extends beyond the left point of the south faćade. The vantage point of the house offered a view of the Avon, of the city of Bristol, and of the Bath hills.

The house was later home to the nineteenth century 'man-of-letters', John Addington Symonds, whose father had bought the house in 1851.

In 1907, May Staveley a lecturer in the History Department of the University of Bristol, started lobbying for need to provide a hall for her students. With support from the Fry family, the Symonds family and private subscriptions, the house was bought for £5,000 in 1909. Following some alterations and furnishing, the hall accepted its first residents on 30 September. Clifton Hill House was the first hall of residence for women in south-west England.

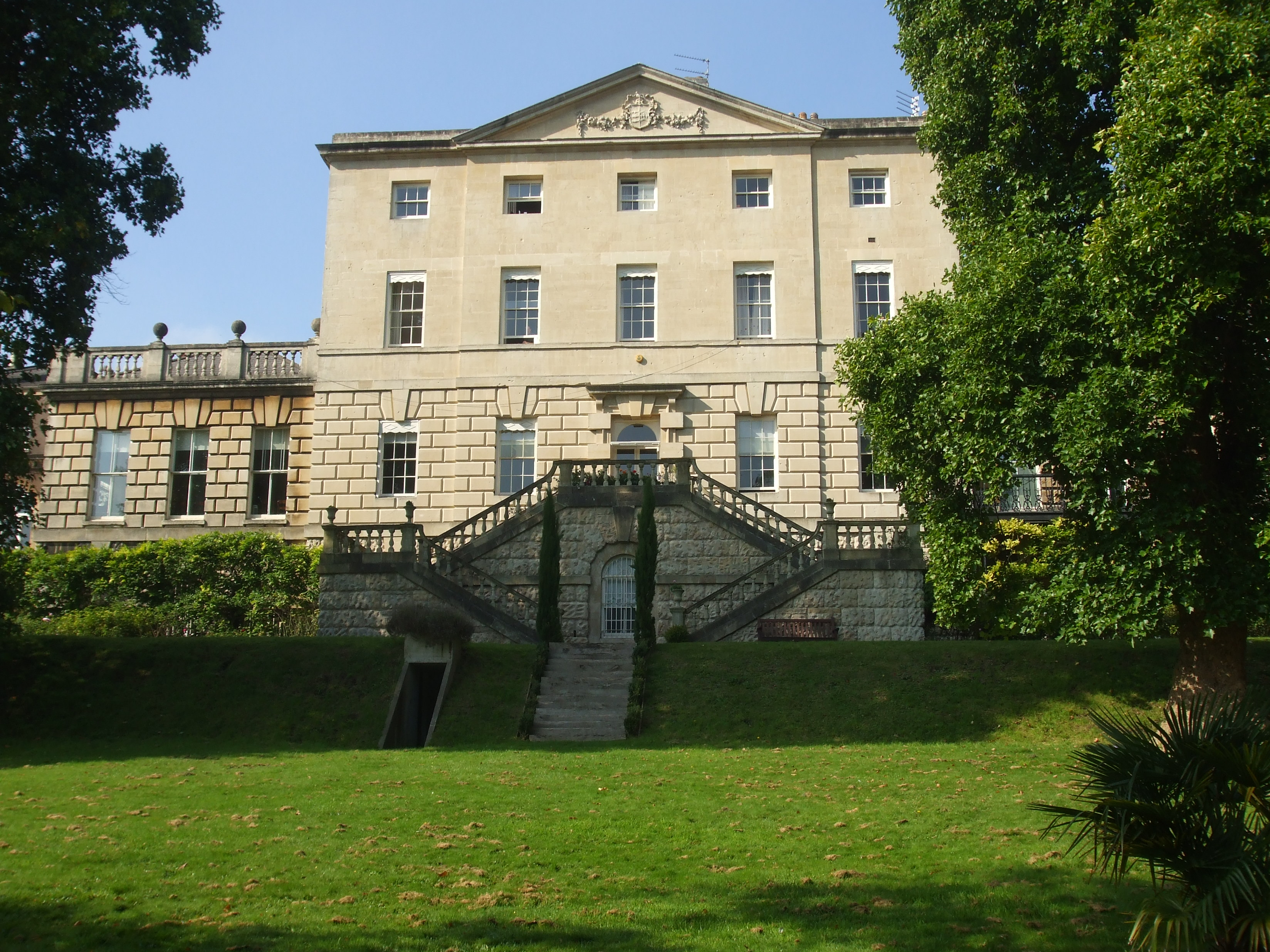
Clifton Hill House

In 1911, the university took over the running of the house and they bought the adjacent Callandar House, which dates from the late 18th century and is itself Grade II listed. Callandar House was extended in the 1920s thanks to the Wills family (regular benefactors to the university) and, along with Old Clifton, continued to house only female residents. Additional land was acquired and, in the early 1960s, Fry Wing was constructed on five floors ("A" to "E" floors) with South Wing following some 10 years later with its 4 floors ("D" to "G" floors). From 1988 to 2010, the Warden at that time, Annie Burnside, implemented a major restoration programme, to restore the Georgian house. The work carried out won the award for ‘Restoration of a Georgian Country House’ at the London Georgian Group Architectural Awards in November 2004.

Clifton Hill House now houses approximately 230 students in total, of all genders. There is a Junior Common Room with a stage. Up until 2025, there was a bar, however this has now been replaced by a cinema room.

The Hall has been used by the BBC as a film location for The House of Eliott and for episodes of Casualty.
