= Lorna Swain =

Methematician

- Born: 22 March 1891; Hampstead, London, England
- Died: 8 May 1936 (aged 45); Hendon, Borough of Barnet, London, England
- Education: Newnham College, Cambridge
- Known for: Fluid Dynamics
- Scientific career
- Fields: Mathematics

Lorna Mary Swain (22 March 1891 – 8 May 1936) was a British mathematician and college lecturer, known for being one of few female mathematicians to contribute their talents to the war effort in World War I, and for being one of few early female lecturers at University of Cambridge. Academically, she is known for her work in fluid dynamics as well as her deep desire to see more women pursue higher education and teaching in the field of mathematics.

== Early life ==
Swain was born on 22 March 1891. She was the daughter of Edward Swain (born 1853) and Mary Isabella Swain (born 1865). Her father worked as a solicitor.

== Education ==
After attending South Hampstead High School in London, Swain was awarded a scholarship to Newnham College, Cambridge in 1910. Following her graduation three years later with a bachelor's degree (First Class Honours) in mathematics, she was to take a position as assistant lecturer at Newnham College after a year's hiatus for research in Göttingen, Germany in 1914.

== Career ==
Her plans to begin research in Göttingen, Germany in 1914 were scuttled by the outbreak of the First World War. With research in Germany untenable, Swain's specialization in fluid dynamics took her instead to Manchester where she began work alongside Horace Lamb with whom she co-published her first academic article. When she returned to Newnham after a year, as expected, the war temporarily focused her fluid dynamics research on the problem of propeller vibration in aircraft, a considerable problem for aircraft used in the First World War. As June Barrow-Green points out, Swain's work during this time, though it derailed her from planned postgraduate work in Germany, was not only practically useful, but also notable. According to Catherine Goldstein, Swain was "...one of the few women to have her name attached to an Advisory Committee for Aeronautics Report at that time." The resulting research was written up with colleague H.A. Webb in a Report of the Advisory Committee for Aeronautics. In 1923 after returning to Newnham, she would publish, with Arthur Berry, "On the Steady Motion of a Cylinder through Infinite Viscous Fluid" in the Proceedings of the Royal Society. She eventually get the opportunity to complete the planned research in Göttingen on sabbatical in 1928–1929. From this later period of research she produced work "On the Turbulent Wake Behind a Body of Revolution", also published in the Proceedings of the Royal Society in November 1929.

By 1920 Swain was promoted to Director of Mathematics Studies at Newnham, and her research suffered under increased teaching and administrative roles. Despite this, Swain used the position to capitalize on her concern for education and teaching. Her teaching philosophy took into account various factors, not least of which was her concern that women were inadequately represented within her chosen field, mathematics. This was paired with a concern for the teaching of applied mathematics. Teaching, she believed, had the potential to stave off the injurious effects that tedious school work could have on the next generation working with applied mathematics.

Promoted in 1926 to College Lecturer at Newnham, Swain returned to teaching and research, particularly teaching advanced courses on hydromechanics and dynamics.

== Death ==
Swain died after a long-standing illness on 8 May 1936 (aged 45), at Derby House, a nursing home in Parson Street, Hendon, in the Borough of Barnet. The funeral service was held on 13 May 1936 at Golders Green Crematorium.
