= Joe Saumarez Smith =

British businessman and journalist (1971–2025)

Joseph Saumarez Smith
- Born: 29 September 1971; London, England
- Died: 8 February 2025 (aged 53)
- Education: Winchester College
- Alma mater: University of Bristol; Wharton School of the University of Pennsylvania
- Occupation: Businessman
- Spouse: Wanda Marshall
- Children: 2
- Relatives: William Saumarez Smith (great-great-grandfather)

Joseph William Saumarez Smith (29 September 1971 – 8 February 2025) was a British businessman, journalist and gambling expert. He was chair of the British Horseracing Authority, the chief executive of Sports Gaming Ltd, a gambling management consultancy, chairman of gambling platform developer Bede Gaming and an investor in numerous online businesses.

== Early life ==
Joseph Saumarez Smith was born on 29 September 1971 in London, England. His paternal great-great-grandfather, William Saumarez Smith, was the Archbishop of Sydney in the late 19th and early 20th century.

Saumarez Smith attended Winchester College and later Bristol University, where he earned a degree in politics and edited Epigram, the university newspaper. He earned an MBA in Management, Strategy and Marketing from the Wharton School of the University of Pennsylvania where he was the recipient of a Thouron Award and also studied at London Business School as part of Wharton's International Exchange Programme.

== Career ==
=== Journalism ===
After university, Saumarez Smith worked at South West News Service, the Bristol-based press agency, and the Sunday Telegraph, as a general news reporter. In 1995, he was appointed education correspondent of the Sunday Telegraph, subsequently becoming their transport and industry correspondent. In 1996, he moved to Express Newspapers as education editor of the Daily Express and the Sunday Express. In 1997, he was appointed deputy political editor of the Sunday Express, working alongside Peter Oborne, Simon Walters and Richard Addis. Saumarez Smith left the Sunday Express in 1999 to study for an MBA.

Saumarez Smith broadcast about gambling. He had regular columns published in the Financial Times.

=== Gambling ===
Saumarez Smith started gambling at the age of eight when Mike Fitzmaurice, a maths master at his preparatory school, started teaching fractions using betting odds. He attended his first race meeting at the age of 12 at Sandown Park, where he opened his first credit account with rails bookmakers Heathorns.

In 2001, he founded Sports Gaming, a management consultancy to the gaming industry. He worked as a consultant to gambling companies and advised on several M&A transactions in the online gambling industry. He was founder of BetUK.com, which was sold to Canadian private equity investors in 2007. Sports Gaming is the publisher of gambling information sites, including BetAsia.com and IndiaBet.com. He was chairman of Bede Gaming, a developer of software platforms used by online and land-based gaming operators.

In June 2003, he acquired Vegas Insider, a US-based gambling information site, which he sold to American investors in 2007.

Saumarez Smith is credited with coining the gambling term Asian handicap.

=== Horseracing ===
Saumarez Smith was a lifelong follower of horseracing, and visited more than 200 racetracks worldwide. He was on the 1991 Jockey Club Graduate Programme, and placed at the Racing Post, where he wrote news articles and Spotlight form commentaries. In December 2014, he was appointed a non executive director of the British Horseracing Authority, the regulator of UK horseracing. In March 2022, it was announced that he would take over from Annamarie Phelps as Chair of the British Horseracing Authority, and in December 2022 it was announced that his term had been extended by racing's shareholders until 2025. In January 2025, the British Horseracing Authority announced that Saumarez Smith, who was diagnosed with lung cancer in 2023, tendered his resignation effective immediately. Independent Director David Jones serves as the interim Chairperson until Lord Allen takes over on June 1.

He had shares in several horses which are trained by Martin Keighley. Saumarez Smith has previously had horses in training with Henry Candy, Ed Dunlop, Kris Lees, Ed Walker, Ilka Gansera-Leveque, David Pipe, Ali Stronge, and Archie Alexander in Australia.

=== Business interests ===
Saumarez Smith was the co-founder and chief executive of Schoolsnet, an online education company, from 1999 to 2001. Schoolsnet was sold to Hotcourses in September 2003.

Saumarez Smith was an investor in numerous Internet start ups. His investments included the sale of IPS to Leo Vegas in February 2018 for £65 million, the sale of luxury cycle clothing company Rapha to RZC Investments for £200 million in August 2017 and the sale of a majority stake in Bede Gaming to the Gauselmann Group in March 2020.

=== Honours and patronages ===
Saumarez Smith was named Commodore/Sunday Times Young Computer Brain of the Year in 1985. He was also named one of Management Today's Young Meteors in November 2000.

He finished as runner up in the 1994 World Series of Poker media event. He also participated in several amateur cycling events, completing the 2011 Etape du Tour Act I cycling race from Modane to Alpe d'Huez in 4,158th place, the 2014 La Marmotte cycling race in 4,133rd place, and the 2015 Maratona dles Dolomites in 3,878th place.

Saumarez Smith was a patron of the Ben Kinsella Trust from September 2018.

== Death ==
Saumarez Smith died from lung cancer on 11 February 2025, at the age of 53.
