= James Landale =

British journalist

- Education: Eton College
- Alma mater: University of Bristol
- Employer: BBC
- Title: Diplomatic Correspondent of BBC News (2016–present); Deputy Political Editor of BBC News (2009–2016); Chief Political Correspondent of BBC News (2004–2009); Editor of Epigram (1988–1990)
- Relatives: David Landale; D. F. Landale

James Landale is a British journalist who is the diplomatic correspondent of the BBC.

== Education ==
Landale was educated at Eton College, where he was a near-contemporary of future Prime Minister David Cameron, before going on to study at the University of Bristol. While studying Politics there, he became the first editor of Epigram, the university's independent student newspaper. In July 2013, Landale was awarded an honorary Doctor of Laws degree by the University of Bristol in recognition of his journalistic achievements.

== Career ==
Before joining the BBC in 2003, Landale spent ten years as a reporter with The Times newspaper, latterly as Assistant Foreign Editor.

In 2005 Landale wrote Duel, a book about a 1826 duel in Kirkcaldy involving his ancestor David Landale.

Landale was chief political correspondent for the BBC News Channel until 2009 when he became Deputy Political Editor, assisting then Political Editor Nick Robinson. During his time as a political correspondent he presented some relief shifts on the channel.

In July 2017, Landale rejected an offer from Prime Minister Theresa May to become the eighth Downing Street Director of Communications. The role was taken by fellow BBC journalist Robbie Gibb.

== Personal life ==
Landale lives in London. He was diagnosed with large B-cell Non-Hodgkin's lymphoma in October 2008, and underwent six courses of chemotherapy.

== Books ==
- Landale, James (2005). Duel: A True Story of Death and Honour. Canongate. ISBN 1-84195-647-3
- Landale, James (2006). Landale's Cautionary Tales: Comic Verse for the 21st Century. Canongate. ISBN 1-84195-847-6

Media offices
Preceded by Guto Harri	Chief Political Correspondent: BBC News; 2004–2009	Succeeded by Laura Kuenssberg
Preceded by New Position	Deputy Political Editor: BBC News; 2009–2016	Succeeded by John Pienaar
Preceded by James Robin	Diplomatic Correspondent: BBC News; 2016–	Succeeded by Incumbent
