= Dani Rabaiotti =

British environmental scientist and popular science writer

Dani Rabaiotti is an English environmental scientist and popular science writer based at the Institute of Zoology at the Zoological Society of London. She is the author (with Nick Caruso) of the New York Times bestseller, Does It Fart, as well as two other books. Her fields of research include global change biology, science policy and science communication.

== Education and research ==
Rabaiotti completed a BSc in Zoology at the University of Bristol in 2012. She then moved to the University of Leeds, achieving an MRes Biodiversity and Conservation. She is working toward a PhD with NERC London Doctoral Training Partnership.

Rabaiotti is currently working on the impact of climate change on African Wild Dogs. The data collection involves on-the-ground fieldwork as well as conservation technology. Her research with the Zoological Society of London, the Kenya Rangelands Wild Dog and Cheetah Project, has identified that fewer than 7,000 wild dogs and 10,000 cheetahs remain in Africa. Rabaiotti uses long term data on the species to the impact of temperature on behaviour, mortality and population level, working towards a spatially explicit species wide model.

== Policy and public engagement ==
Rabaiotti was the 2016 BES POST Fellow. In this post, she wrote a POSTNote - a research briefing on Environmental Crime - any illegal activity that harms the environment. Following this, she secured a Research Councils UK science policy placement at the Royal Society. In 2017 she was selected by the British Ecological Society to ask leading figures within government and Parliament questions relating to science policy in the UK at the RSB's Voice of the Future.

When Bill Nye joined Twitter in 2017, Rabaiotti was the first scientist to greet him using the hashtag #BillMeetScienceTwitter. Less than a day after the hashtag was born, Nye replied with "I see you, Science Twitter. You are the aerodynamic laminar flow beneath my wings". Nye featured Rabaiotti in the trailer for Season 2 of Bill Nye Saves the World.

Rabaiotti is a contributor to BBC Wildlife Magazine, Gizmodo and Nature News & Comment. She has featured on radio, television and podcasts.

== Does it Fart? ==
After a Twitter discussion about farting snakes (#DoesItFart), Rabaiotti partnered with Nick Caruso of the University of Alabama to crowd source a database of animal flatulence. Rabaiotti told the Washington Post that "Does it fart? is one of the most frequent questions zoologists receive from kids". The pair published a book, illustrated by Ethan Kocak, with Quercus in 2017.

In 2018 the pair published the follow-up called True or Poo?, a book about "poop and gross animal habits".

== Bibliography ==
- Caruso, Nick; Rabaiotti, Dani (2018). Does it fart? the definitive field guide to animal flatulence. illustrated by Kocak, Ethan. New York: Hachette Books. ISBN 978-0-316-48415-2. OCLC 1029553175.
- Caruso, Nick; Rabaiotti, Dani (2018). True or Poo?: the Definitive Field Guide to Filthy Animal Facts and Falsehoods. Hachette Books. ISBN 9780316528092. OCLC 1048937865.
- Caruso, Nick; Rabaiotti, Dani (2019). Believe it or Snot: The Definitive Field Guide to Earth's Slimy Creatures. Illustrated by Kocak, Ethan. Hachette Books. ISBN 9780306846137. OCLC 1129442967.
