= Epigram (newspaper) =

University of Bristol student newspaper

- Epigram's front cover, December 2022
- Type: Monthly student newspaper
- Format: Compact (Tabloid)
- Owner: Independent
- Editor: Emma Coleman and Jed Dixon, 2026/27
- Founded: 1988
- Headquarters: [[The Hawthorns, Bristol]
- Website: [epigram.org.uk]

Epigram is an independent student newspaper of the University of Bristol. It was established in 1988 by James Landale, now a senior BBC journalist, who studied politics at Bristol. Former editor of The Daily Telegraph, William Lewis, was a writer for Epigram in its early years.

Epigram is produced monthly during term time, and as of November 2022 the newspaper has reached 366 editions. It is available as a paper edition distributed freely around the university, with articles and discussion also appearing online. The website has now become key to Epigram's output, with tens of thousands of hits each month. In October 2026 the paper launched Epicast, a news and current affairs podcast streaming on Spotify, founded and hosted by News Editor Lenny Osler. The paper follows a traditional newspaper layout: the front of the newspaper is devoted to news issues, particularly those concerning students at the university.

With the addition of online editors for each of Epigram's 14 sections in order to update the paper's growing website, it now has a 70-strong editorial team mostly consisting of students from the second year and above (formal recruitment is carried out in the last term of an academic year).

All students at the university are encouraged to write for the paper, with hundreds of students contributing each year. There are opportunities to join each section at the Freshers' Fair at the beginning of the year, or by emailing the relevant section editor.

== Political stance ==
Epigram often attempts to be the voice of the students in a debate. In November 2006 Epigram published appeals from history students decrying the new teaching system that was to be implemented. This brought the issue to a much wider stage including several national broadsheet newspapers. The story first published in Epigram was picked up by The Times newspaper and the BBC The Telegraph cites Epigram in stating the History students were made aware of the courses structure before starting the course.

The paper took a similar pro-student stance when an Epigram story focusing on students becoming lap dancers and one Bristol University student selling their eggs to fertility clinics to reduce levels of student debt was picked up by the BBC. An Epigram report into drugs use at the university was similarly picked up by the BBC. In 2011, Epigram revealed that the university planned to scrap bursaries (before a partial U-turn), a story which was later picked up by The Guardian. In 2012, using freedom of information requests, Epigram discovered that Bristol University's vice-chancellor had endorsed a privatised fee scheme in which banks or other investors would buy a proportion of students' future earnings in return for paying their tuition. This story was subsequently picked up by The Times.

In the 2014–15 academic year, Epigram had a total of 12 stories picked up by national news outlets, including The Independent, The Daily Telegraph and The Huffington Post, and three by The Bristol Post.

== Notable contributors ==
- William Lewis
- James Landale (Founding editor)
- Tom Chesshyre (News editor)
- Krissi Murison
- Kate Quilton
- Holly Smale
- Susanna Reid (Editor 1990-1991)
- Joseph Saumarez Smith (Editor 1991-1992)
