= University of Bristol =

Research university in England

- Coat of arms
- Motto: Latin: Vim promovet insitam
- Motto in English: Learning promotes one's innate power (from Horace, Ode 4.4)
- Type: Public red brick research university
- Established: 1876 – University College, Bristol; 1909 – received royal charter
- Academic affiliations: ACU; Coimbra Group; EUA; GW4; PEGASUS; Russell Group; SETsquared; Universities UK; WUN; Defence Universities Alliance
- Endowment: £94.6 million (2025)
- Budget: £1.155 billion (2024/25)
- Chancellor: Paul Nurse
- Vice-Chancellor: Evelyn Welch
- Visitor: Rt Hon. Sir Alan Campbell MP (as Lord President of the Council ex officio)
- Academic staff: 3,825 (2024/25)
- Administrative staff: 5,425 (2024/25)
- Students: 32,435 (2024/25); 30,510 FTE (2024/25)
- Undergraduates: 23,865 (2024/25)
- Postgraduates: 8,570 (2024/25)
- Location: Bristol, England; 51°27′23″N 02°36′16″W
- Campus: Urban
- Students' Union: University of Bristol Union
- Newspaper: Epigram
- Colours: Pantone 187
- Website: bristol.ac.uk

The University of Bristol is a public research university in Bristol, England. It received its royal charter in 1909, although it can trace its roots to University College, Bristol, established in 1876. Bristol Medical School, founded in 1833, was merged with the university college in 1893, and later became the university's school of medicine.

The university is organised into three academic faculties composed of multiple schools and departments running over 200 undergraduate courses, largely in the Tyndall's Park area of the city. It had a total income of £1.16 billion in 2024–25, of which £342.1 million was from research grants and contracts, with an expenditure of £1.09 billion. The University of Bristol's alumni and faculty include 13 Nobel laureates.

Bristol is a member of the Russell Group of research-intensive British universities, the European-wide Coimbra Group and the Worldwide Universities Network.

== History ==
=== Foundation ===
The university was the successor to University College Bristol, founded in 1876. The college was open from the start to both men and women, and opened with 99 day students (30 men and 69 women) and 243 evening students (143 men and 95 women). The university college was the first such institution in the country to admit women on the same basis as men. The botanic garden was established in 1882, originally adjacent to the university college in Clifton. In 1893 Bristol Medical School (founded 1833) merged with the university college. However, women were forbidden to take examinations in medicine until 1906.

The engineering department of the Merchant Venturers' Technical College (founded as Bristol Trade and Mining School in 1856) became the engineering faculty of Bristol University in 1909 following disputes with the university college in the 1890s, being finally merged in to the university in 1949.

The university college was able to apply for a royal charter due to the financial support of the Wills and Fry families, who made their fortunes in tobacco plantations and chocolate respectively (while there was no funding to the university college from Edward Colston, the trade school that became the Merchant Venturers' Technical College and then the university's engineering faculty was run by the Colston Trustees until 1885). A 2018 study commissioned by the university estimated 85% of the philanthropic funds used for the institution's foundation "depended on the labour of enslaved people".

=== Early years ===
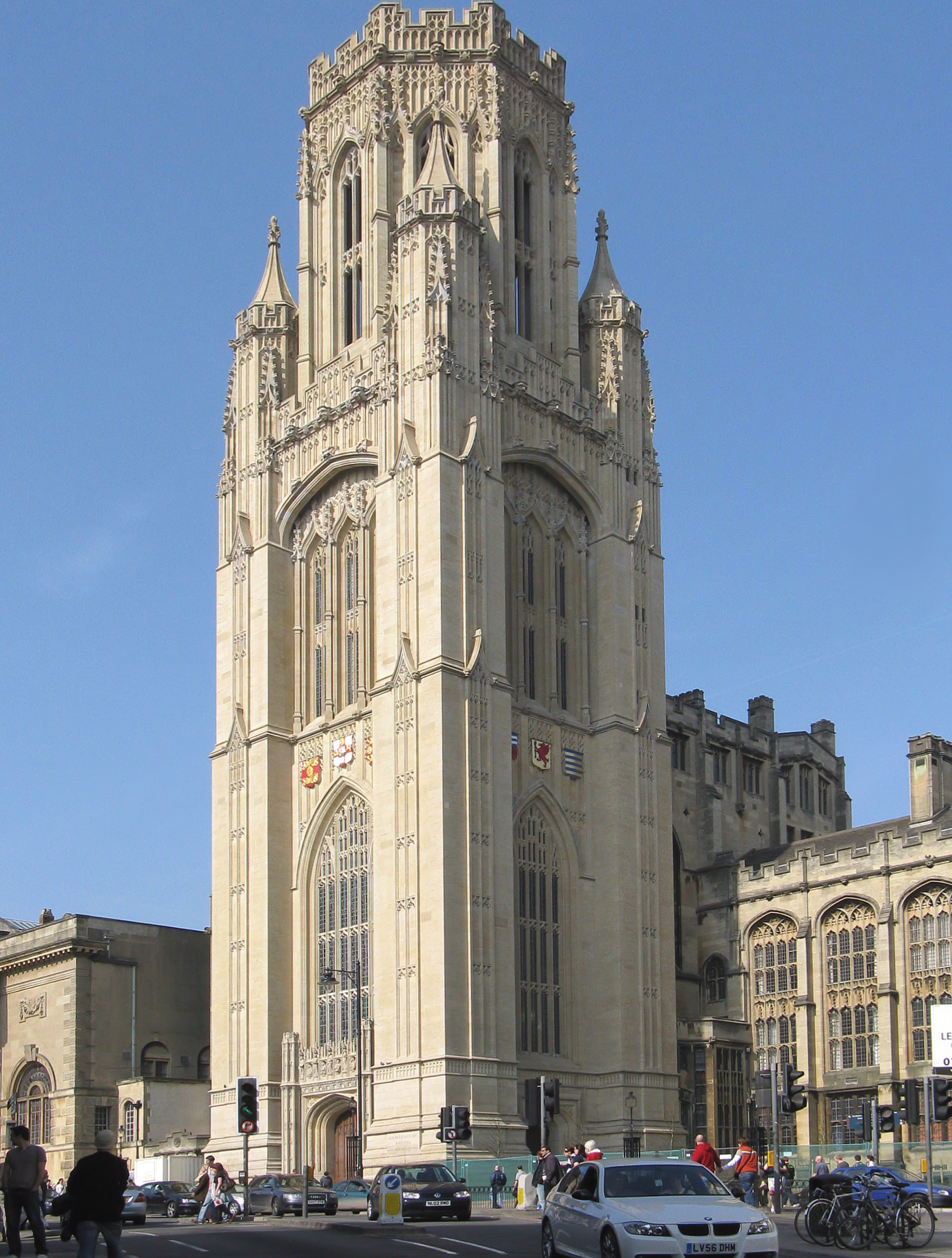
Wills Memorial Building (Schools of Law and Earth Sciences) on Park Street, Bristol. The tower was cleaned in 2006–2007.

In 1908, gifts from the Fry and Wills families, particularly £100,000 from Henry Overton Wills III (£6m in today's money), were provided to endow a university for Bristol and the West of England, provided that a royal charter could be obtained within two years. In December 1909, the king granted the charter. Henry Wills became its first chancellor and Conwy Lloyd Morgan the first vice-chancellor. Wills died in 1911 and in tribute his sons George and Harry built the Wills Memorial Building, started in 1913 and completed in 1925.

In 1920, George Wills bought the Victoria Rooms and endowed them to the university as a students' union.

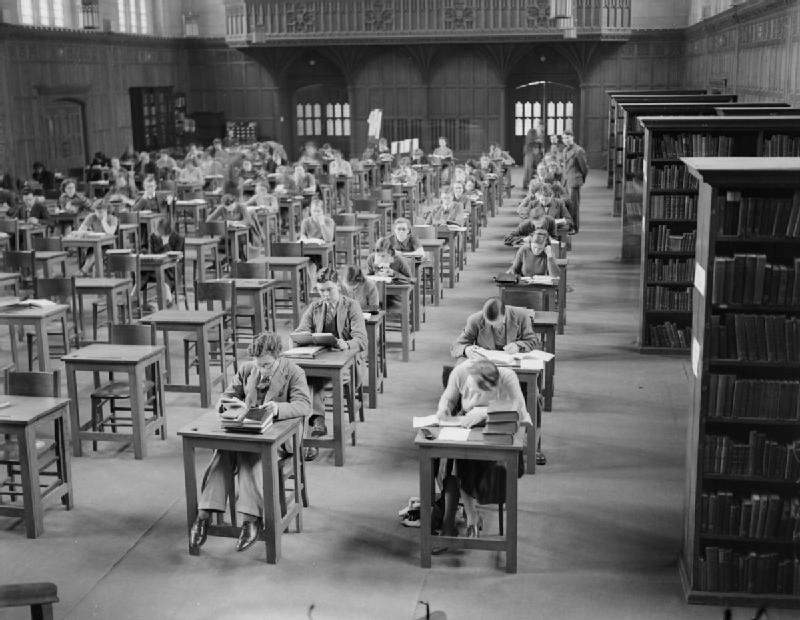
Evacuated King's College London students at the University of Bristol in 1940

Paul Dirac graduated from Bristol in 1921 with a degree in engineering, before obtaining a second degree in mathematics in 1923 from Cambridge. For his subsequent pioneering work on quantum mechanics, he was awarded the 1933 Nobel Prize in Physics. Later in the 1920s, the H. H. Wills Physics Laboratory was opened by Ernest Rutherford.

The students' union was formed in October 1924 by the merger of the university guild and the university club.

Winston Churchill became the university's third chancellor in 1929, serving the university in that capacity until 1965. He succeeded Richard Haldane, who had held the office from 1912 following the death of Henry Wills.

During World War II, the Wills Memorial was bombed in the Bristol Blitz, destroying the great hall and its organ along with thousands of books from the library of King's College London that had been moved to Bristol for safe keeping. The great hall did not reopen until 1963.

=== Post-war development ===
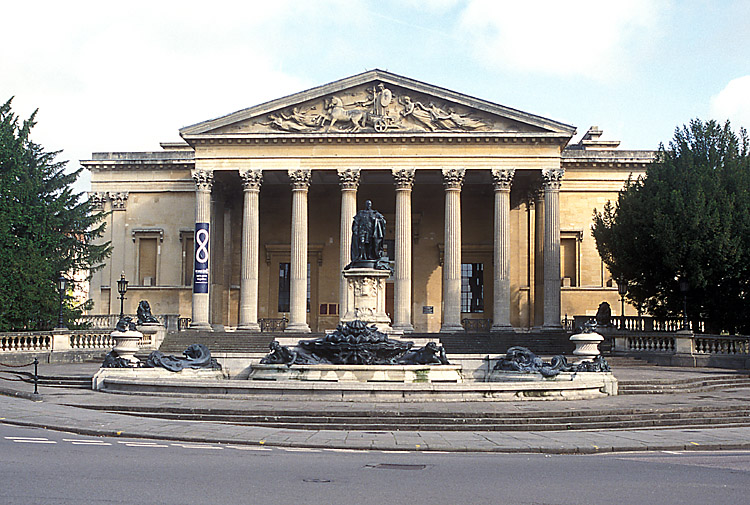
The Victoria Rooms, housing the School of Music

In 1947, the university established the first degree in drama in the country. In the same year, Bristol began offering special entrance exams and grants to aid the resettlement of servicemen returning home.

In 1965, the students' union moved to the Richmond Building. This has been noted as an example of the trend to students' union buildings "of vast proportions" in the 1960s and 1970s.

In 1968, Bristol students held a sit-in as part of a national campaign for students to have more representation on university governing bodies and for widening access. In Bristol they also called for students from other establishments in the city to be allowed to join the union.

A series of chancellors and vice-chancellors led the university through these decades, with Henry Somerset, 10th Duke of Beaufort taking over from Churchill as chancellor in 1965 before being succeeded by Dorothy Hodgkin in 1970 who spent the next 18 years in the office.

One of the few centres for deaf studies in the United Kingdom was established in Bristol in 1981, followed in 1988 by the Norah Fry Centre for research into learning difficulties.

In 1989, Sir Jeremy Morse, then chairman of Lloyds Bank, became chancellor.

=== 21st century ===
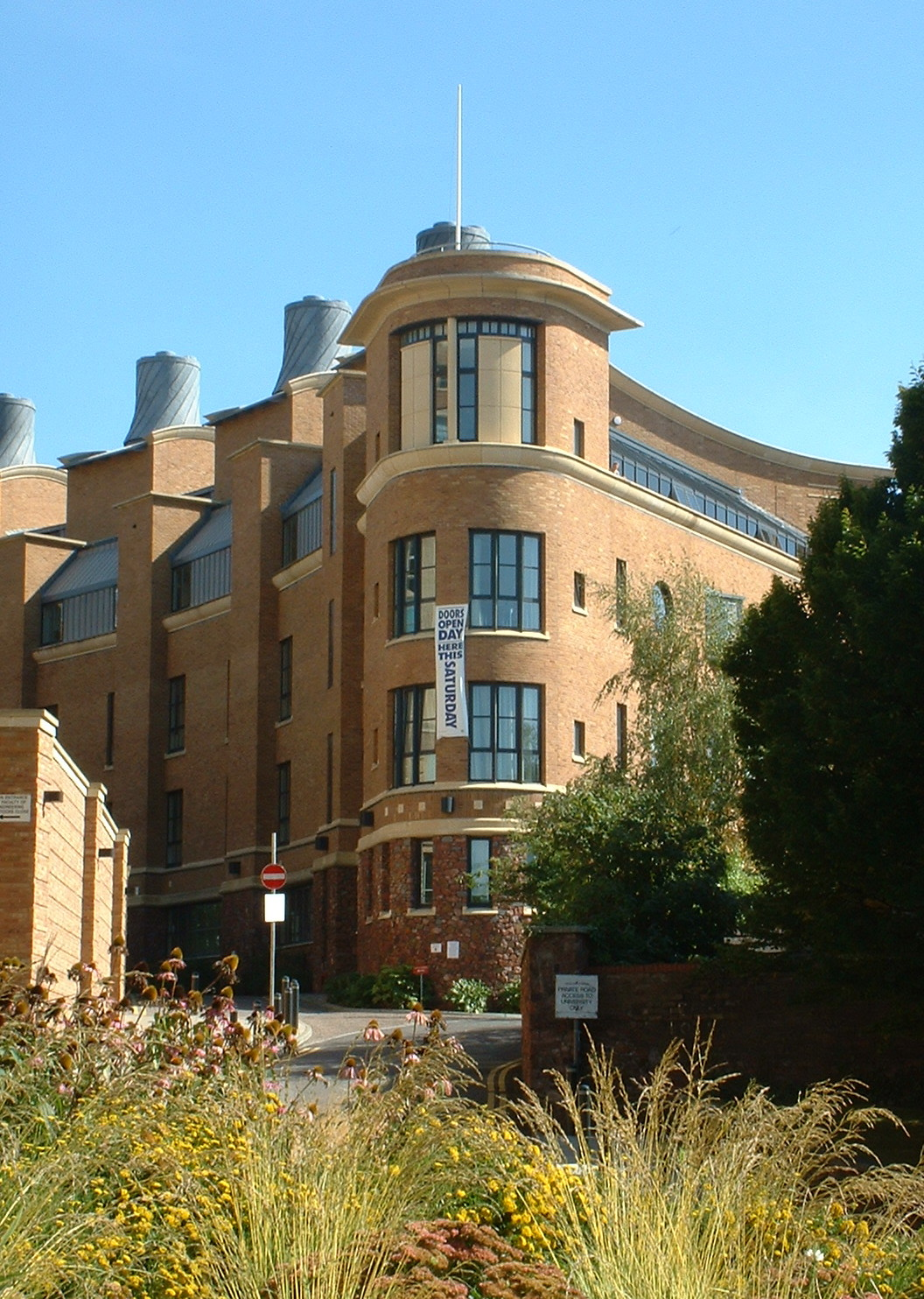
School of Chemistry in 2003

Growth in the number of postgraduate students lead to the establishment of the postgraduate union in 2000.

In 2002, the university was involved in an argument over press intrusion after details of then-prime minister Tony Blair's son's application to university were published in national newspapers. In the same year, the university opened the new Centre for Sports, Exercise and Health in the university precinct. At a cost, local residents can also use the facilities.

Brenda Hale, the first female Law Lord, became chancellor of the university in 2003. Paul Nurse succeeded Lady Hale as chancellor on 1 January 2017.

In 2004, the Faculty of Engineering completed work on the Bristol Laboratory for Advanced Dynamics Engineering (BLADE), It was built as an extension to the Queen's Building and was officially opened by Queen Elizabeth II in March 2005.

In January 2005, the School of Chemistry was awarded £4.5m by the Higher Education Funding Council for England to create Bristol ChemLabS: a Centre for Excellence in Teaching & Learning (CETL), with an additional £350k announced for the capital part of the project in February 2006. Bristol ChemLabS stands for Bristol Chemical Laboratory Sciences; it is the only chemistry CETL in the UK.

September 2009 saw the opening of the university's Centre for Nanoscience and Quantum Information.

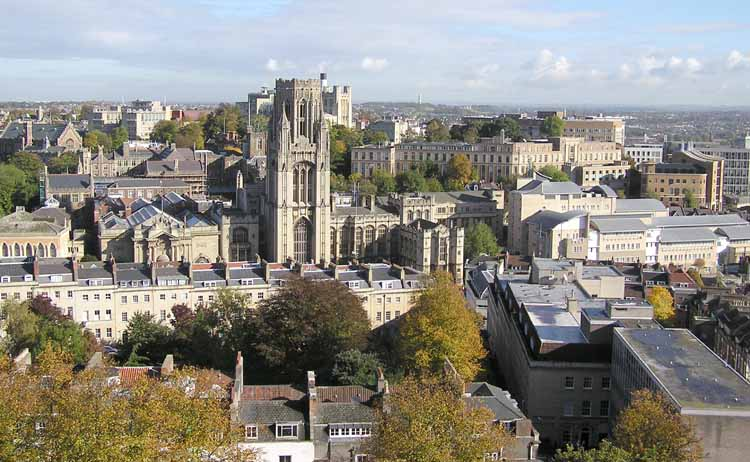
Most of the buildings here are used by the university. The Wills Memorial Building is left of centre. Viewed from the Cabot Tower on Brandon Hill

Redevelopment of the centre of the university precinct began in September 2011, with the start of construction of a new life sciences building.

In 2018 while building work was underway in the Fry Building, the building caught fire.

In 2022, a judge found that the University of Bristol had contributed to a student's death by failing to make reasonable accommodations.

In October 2021, Bristol dismissed Professor David Miller following accusations of antisemitism and an internal investigation. An employment tribunal found in February 2024 that his anti-Zionist beliefs were protected under equality law. The University of Bristol unsuccessfully appealed the ruling at the Employment Appeal Tribunal in February 2025.

In 2024 the university revised their emblem, removing the dolphin emblem because of its connection to the slave trader Edward Colston and adding an image of moving pages and a bookmark.

In 2025, BristolSEDS, a student society within the university, successfully hot-fired a 6 kilonewton bi-propellant rocket engine, claiming the record for the highest thrust of an engine of this type designed by students in the UK.

BristolSEDS' record-breaking hotfire

== Campus ==
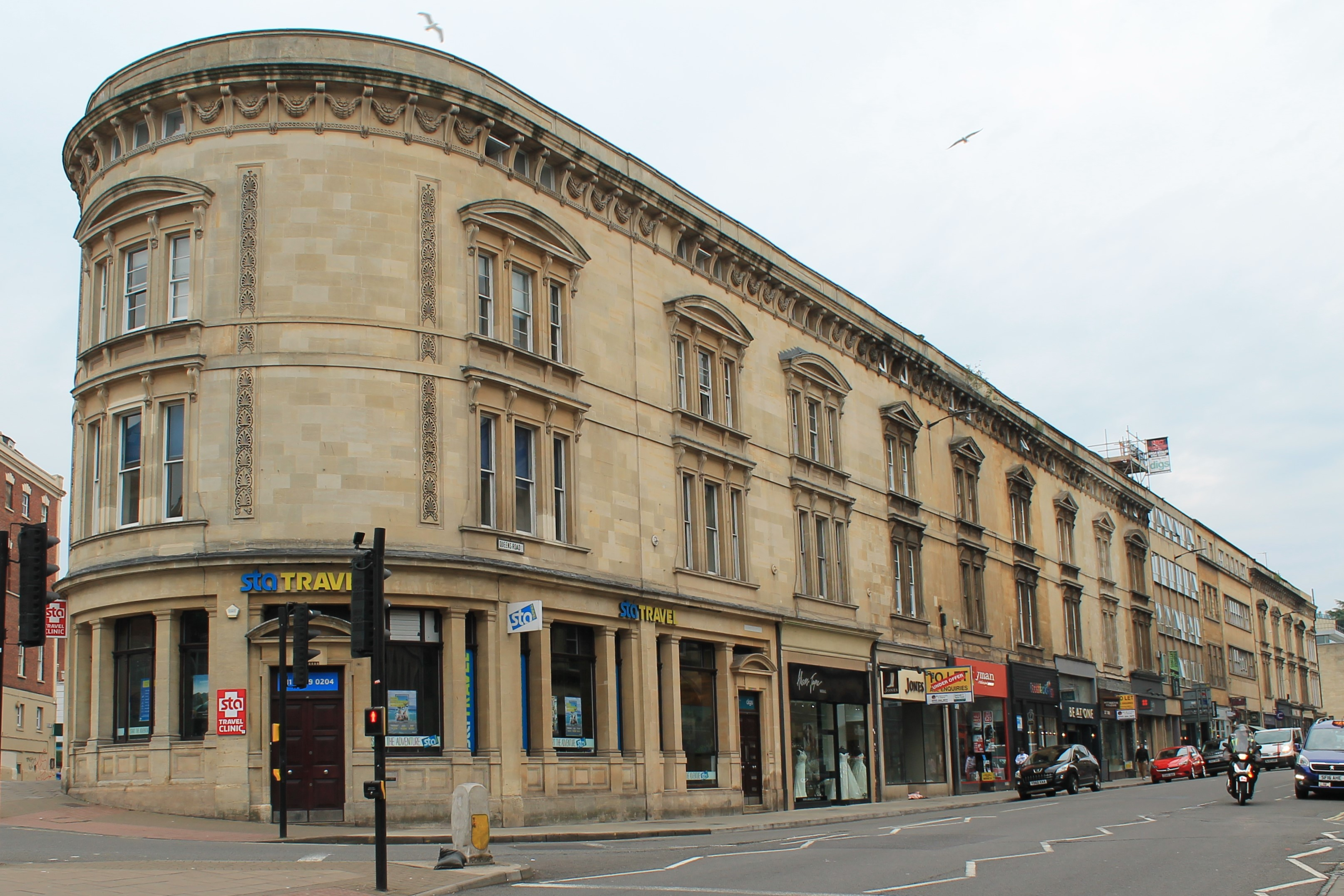
Queen's Road, in the University Precinct

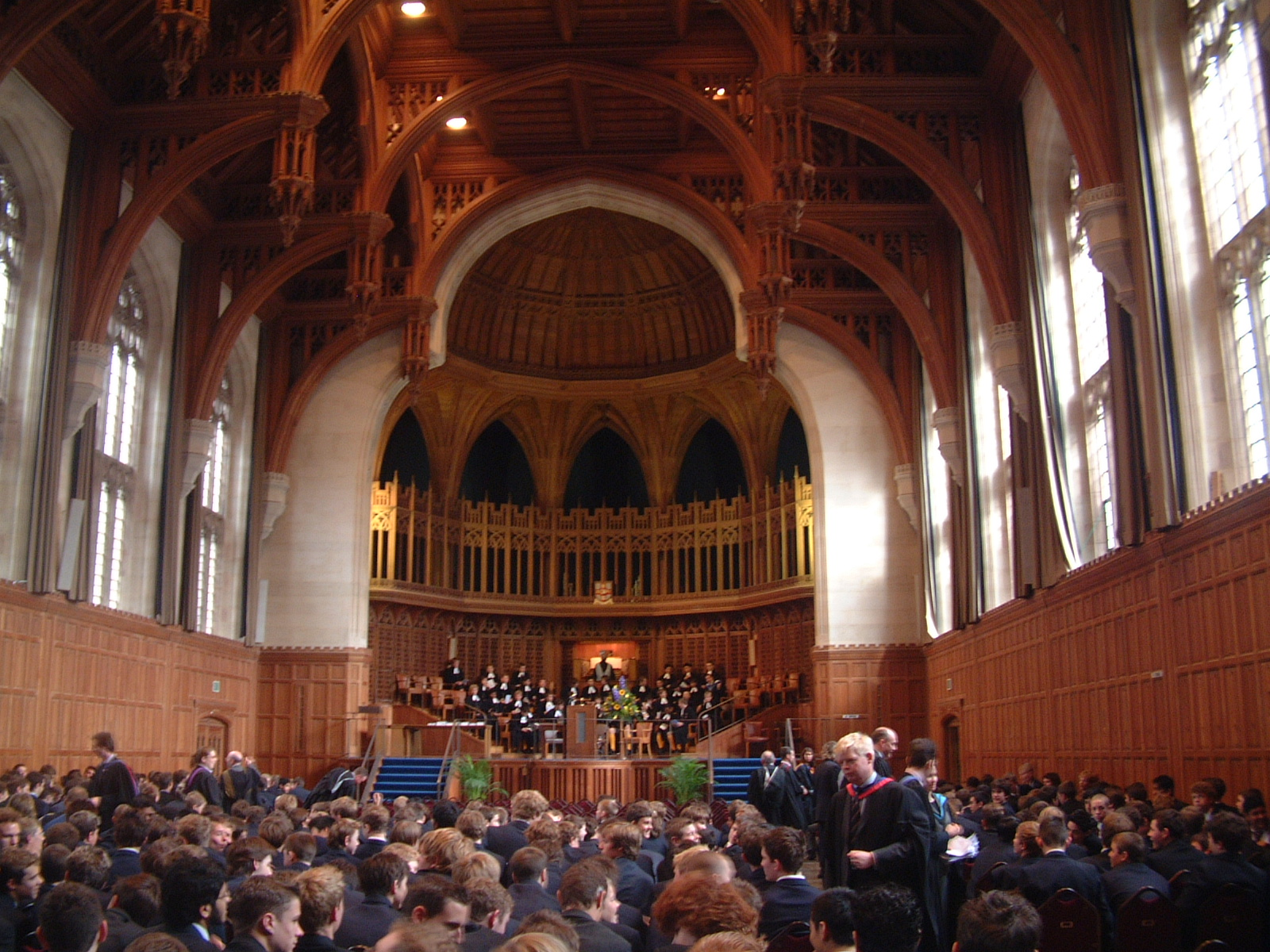
The Great Hall of the Wills Memorial Building, here used for an award ceremony for the Queen Elizabeth's Hospital

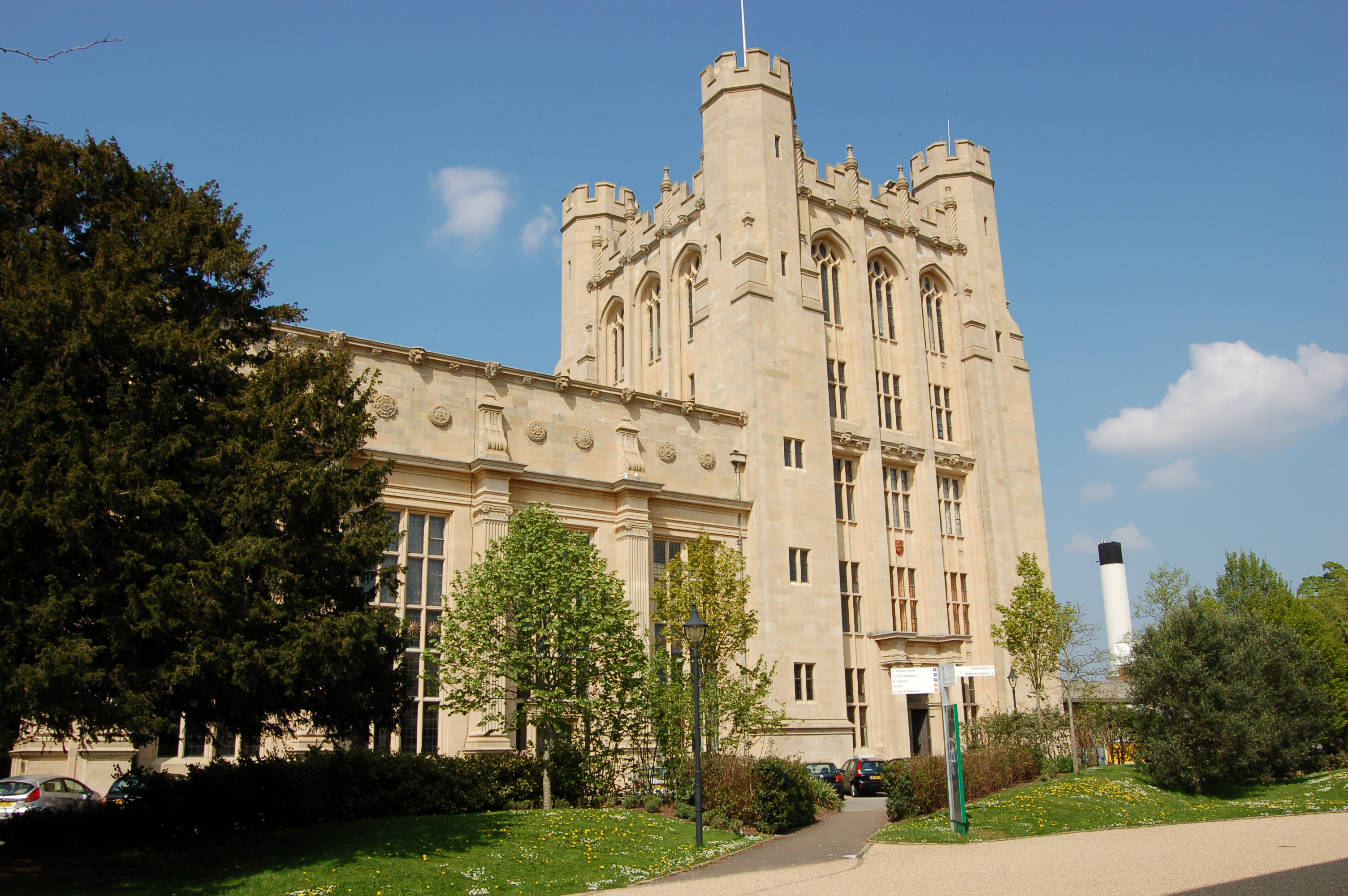
H. H. Wills Physics Laboratory

=== Buildings and sites ===
The university does not have a main campus but is spread over a considerable geographic area. Most of its activities, however, are concentrated in the area of the city centre, referred to as the "University Precinct".

Some of the University of Bristol's buildings date to its pre-charter days when it was University College Bristol. These buildings were designed by Charles Hansom, and suffered being built in stages due to financial pressure. The first large scale building project the University of Bristol undertook on gaining a charter was the Wills Memorial Building. Other notable buildings and sites include Royal Fort House, the University of Bristol Botanic Garden, many large Victorian houses which were converted for teaching in the Faculty of Arts, and the Victoria Rooms which house the Music Department and were designed by Charles Dyer. The tympanum of the building depicts a scene from The Advent of Morning designed by Jabez Tyley.

Goldney gardens entered the property of the University of Bristol through George Wills who had hoped to build an all-male hall of residence there. This was prevented due to the moral objection of the then warden of Clifton Hill House who objected to the idea of male and female residences being in such close proximity. University records show that Miss Starvey was prepared to resign over the issue and that she had the support of the then Chancellor Conwy Lloyd Morgan. Eventually land was purchased in Stoke Bishop, allowing the building of what has been described as a "quasi-Oxbridge" hall, Wills Hall, to which was added the Dame Monica Wills Chapel by George Wills' widow after his death. When Goldney did become student accommodation in 1956, the flats were designed by Michael Grice who received an award from the Civic Trust for their design.

Many of the more modern buildings, including Senate House and the newer parts of the HH Wills Physics Laboratory, were designed by Ralph Brentnall using funds from the University Grants Committee. He is also responsible for the extension to the Wills Memorial Building library which was completed to such standard that few now realise that is an extension to the original building.

In May 2022, the university announced the opening of the Gambling Harms and Research Centre (GHRC). The centre worth £4 million aims to increase awareness and understanding of the dangers of gambling. The project was funded by the GambleAware charity, which chose the university for its history in researching gambling issues, and will integrate research from six facilities.

=== Temple Quarter Campus ===
In November 2016, the university announced that it plans to build a Temple Quarter Campus for around 5,000 students, next to Bristol Temple Meads railway station within Bristol Temple Quarter Enterprise Zone. Construction cost £500 million. The campus opened in September 2026.

== Organisation and governance ==
In common with most UK universities, Bristol is headed formally by the chancellor, currently Sir Paul Nurse and led on a day-to-day basis by the vice-chancellor, currently Professor Evelyn Welch, who is the academic leader and chief executive. There are four pro vice-chancellors and three ceremonial pro-chancellors. The chancellor may hold office for up to ten years and the pro-chancellors for up to three, unless the University Court determines otherwise, but the vice-chancellor and pro-vice-chancellors have no term limits. The vice-chancellor is supported by a deputy vice-chancellor.

Responsibility for running the university is held at an executive level by the vice-chancellor, but the council is the only body that can recommend changes to the university's statutes and charter, with the exception of academic ordinances. These can only be made with the consent of the senate, the chief academic body in the university which also holds responsibility for teaching and learning, examinations and research and enterprise. The chancellor and pro chancellors are nominated by council and appointed formally by court, whose additional powers are now limited to these appointments and a few others, including some lay members of council. Finally, Convocation, the body of all staff, ceremonial officers and graduates of the university, returns 100 members to court and one member to council, but is otherwise principally a forum for discussion and to ensure graduates stay in touch with the university.

The university is made up of a number of schools and departments organised into three faculties:

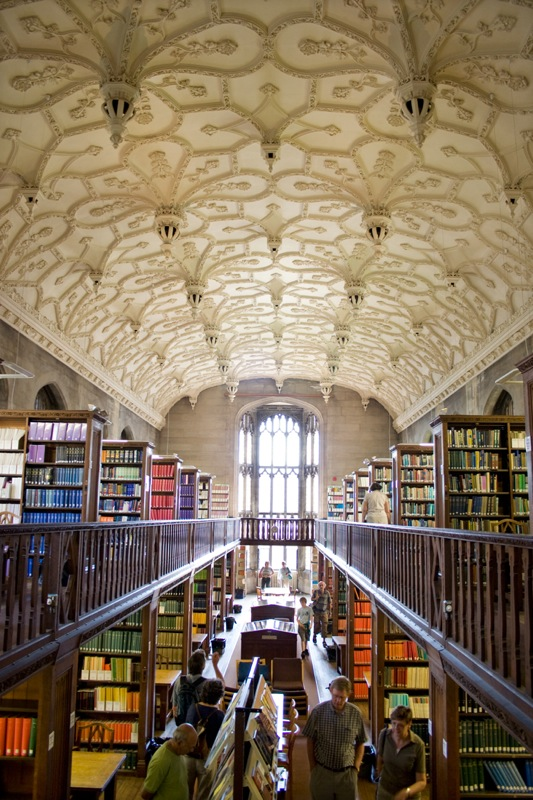
The Wills Memorial Library of Law and Earth Sciences

=== Faculty of Arts, Law and Social Sciences ===
- Centre for Academic Language and Development
- Centre for Innovation and Entrepreneurship
- School of Arts
  - Anthropology and Archaeology
  - Film and Television
  - Music
  - Philosophy
  - Theatre (see also the University of Bristol Theatre Collection)
- School of Economics
- School of Education
- School of Humanities
  - Classics and Ancient History
  - English
  - History
  - History of Art
  - Theology and Religious Studies
- School of Modern Languages
  - French
  - German
  - Hispanic, Portuguese and Latin American Studies
  - Italian
  - Russian
- School for Policy Studies
- School of Sociology, Politics and International Studies (SPAIS)
- University of Bristol Business School
- University of Bristol Law School

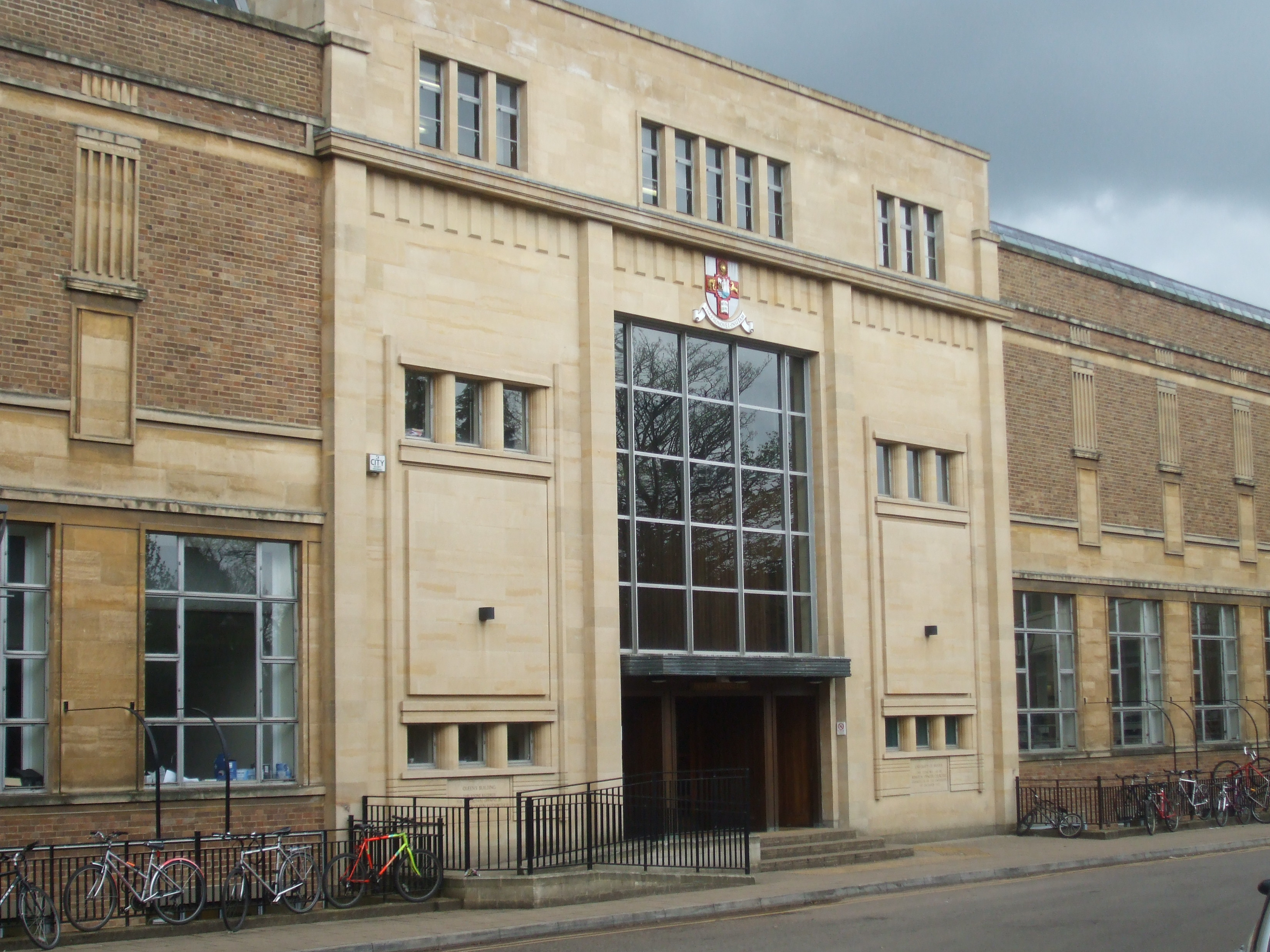
Faculty of Science and Engineering Queen's Building

=== Faculty of Science and Engineering ===
- School of Chemistry
- School of Civil, Aerospace and Design Engineering
- School of Computer Science
- School of Earth Sciences
- School of Electrical, Electronic and Mechanical Engineering
- School of Engineering Mathematics and Technology
- School of Geographical Sciences
- School of Mathematics
- School of Physics

=== Faculty of Health and Life Sciences ===
- Bristol Dental School
- Bristol Medical School
- Bristol Veterinary School
- Bristol Anatomy Centre
- School of Biochemistry and Biomedical Sciences
- School of Biological Sciences
- School of Psychology and Neuroscience

=== Academic dress ===
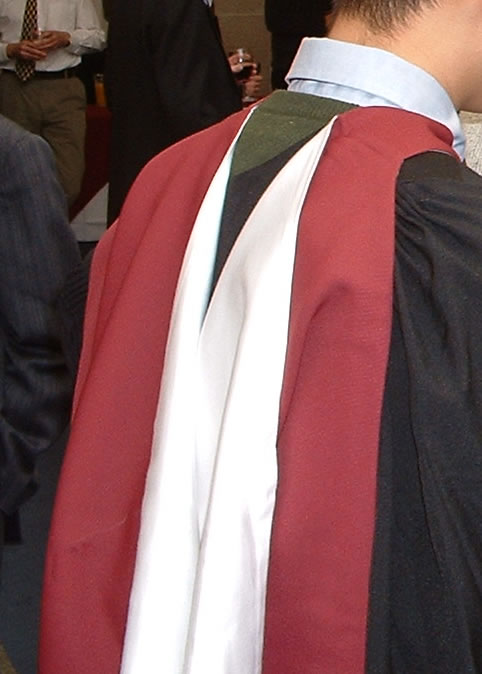
Master's hood at the University of Bristol

The university specifies a mix of Cambridge and Oxford academic dress. For the most part, it uses Oxford-style gowns and Cambridge-style hoods, which are required to be 'university red' (see the logo at the top of the page).

=== Degrees ===
Bristol awards a range of academic degrees spanning bachelor's and master's degrees as well as junior doctorates and higher doctorates. The postnominals awarded are the degree abbreviations used commonly among British universities. The university is part of the Engineering Doctorate scheme, and awards the Eng. D. in systems engineering, engineering management, aerospace engineering and non-destructive evaluation.

Bristol notably does not award by title any bachelor's degrees in music, which is available for study but awarded BA (although it does award MMus and DMus), nor any degree in divinity, since divinity is not available for study (students of theology are awarded a BA). Similarly, the university does not award BLitt (Bachelor of Letters), although it does award both MLitt and DLitt. In regulations, the university does not name MD or DDS as higher doctorates, although they are in many universities as these degrees are normally accredited professional doctorates.

The degrees of DLitt, DSc, DEng, LLD and DMus, whilst having regulations specifying the grounds for award, are most often conferred as honorary degrees (in honoris causa). Those used most commonly are the DLitt, DSc and LLD, with the MA (and occasionally the MLitt) also sometimes conferred honorarily for distinction in the local area or within the university.

=== Finances ===
In the financial year ending 31 July 2024, Bristol had a total income of £1.060 billion (2022/23 – £902.2 million) and total expenditure of £768.7 million (2022/23 – £807.5 million). Key sources of income included £459.9 million from tuition fees and education contracts (2022/23 – £416.4 million), £119 million from funding body grants (2022/23 – £127.7 million), £294.1 million from research grants and contracts (2022/23 – £203.3 million), £16.5 million from investment income (2022/23 – £13.6 million) and £8.9 million from endowment donations (2022/23 – £0.6 million).

At year end, Bristol had endowments of £98.7 million (2023 – £86.1 million) and total net assets of £1.581 billion (2023 – £1.256 billion). It holds the fifteenth-largest endowment of any university in the UK.

=== Logo and arms ===
Coat of Arms

In 2004, the university unveiled its new logo. The icons in the logo are the sun for the Wills family, the dolphin for Colston, the horse for Fry and the ship-and-castle from the medieval seal of the City of Bristol, as also used in the coat of arms. The shape of the whole logo represents the open book of learning. This logo has replaced the university arms shown, but the arms continue to be used where there is a specific historical or ceremonial requirement. The arms comprise:

argent on a cross quadrate gules the arms of the City of Bristol between in pale and a sun in splendour (for Wills) and an open book proper, leaved and clasped or, and inscribed with the words Nisi quia Dominus, and in fesse to the sinister a dolphin embowed (for Colston), and to the dexter a horse courant (for Fry), both of the third.

The inscription on the book is the Latin opening of the 124th Psalm, "If the Lord Himself had not (been on our side...)". The Latin motto granted with the Arms below the shields is Vim promovet insitam, from the fourth Ode of Horace's fourth book meaning '[Learning] promotes one's innate power'.

== Academic profile ==
=== Admissions ===
UCAS Admission Statistics
| | 2025 | 2024 | 2023 | 2022 | 2021 |
|---|---|---|---|---|---|
| Applications (Note: Main scheme applications, International and UK) | 65,260 | 63,185 | 61,490 | 60,075 | 58,185 |
| Accepted | 8,175 | 7,485 | 6,955 | 6,145 | 7,650 |
| Applications/Accepted Ratio | 8.0 | 8.4 | 8.8 | 9.8 | 7.6 |
| Overall Offer Rate (%) | 71.9 | 67.1 | 59.1 | 54.5 | 66.8 |
| ↳ UK only (%) (Note: UK domiciled applicants) | 70.3 | 66.4 | 57.2 | 51.7 | 64.0 |
| Average Entry Tariff | —N/a | —N/a | 161 | 173 | 174 |
| ↳ Top three exams (Note: The maximum tariff score for three exams is 168: the equivalent of A*A*A* at A-Level, 777 at HL for the IB Diploma Programme, or AAA at Advanced Higher) | —N/a | —N/a | 153.4 | 156.7 | 156.0 |

HESA Student Body Composition (2024/25)
| Domicile and Ethnicity | Total |
|---|---|
| British White (Note: Not be confused solely with White British) | 50% |
| British Ethnic Minorities (Note: Includes those who indicate that they identify as Asian, Black, Mixed Heritage, Arab or any other ethnicity except White.) | 16% |
| International EU | 2% |
| International Non-EU | 31% |
Undergraduate Widening Participation Indicators
| Female | 54% |
| Independent School | 23% |
| Low Participation Areas (Note: Calculated from the Polar4 measure, using Quintile1, in England and Wales. Calculated from the Scottish Index of Multiple Deprivation (SIMD) measure, using SIMD20, in Scotland.) | 7% |

In the 2024/25 academic year, the student body consisted of 32,435 students, composed of 23,865 undergraduates and 8,570 postgraduate students. The university is consistently designated as a 'high-tariff' institution by the Department for Education, with the average undergraduate entrant to the university in recent years amassing between 153 and 157 UCAS Tariff points in their top three pre-university qualifications – the equivalent of A*AA to A*A*A at A-Level. Based on 2022/23 HESA entry standards data published in domestic league tables, which include a broad range of qualifications beyond the top three exam grades, the average student at the University of Bristol achieved 173 points – the 12th highest in the country. Competition for places is high with an average 7.7 applications per place according to the 2014 Sunday Times League Tables, making it the joint 11th most competitive university in the UK. The university gave offers of admission to 52.2% of its undergraduate applicants in 2022, the 17th lowest offer rate across the country.

According to the 2017 Times and Sunday Times Good University Guide, approximately 40% of Bristol's undergraduates come from independent schools. In the 2016–17 academic year, the university had a domicile breakdown of 78:5:17 of UK:EU:non-EU students respectively with a female to male ratio of 55:45.

=== Rankings and reputation ===
Rankings
National rankings
- Complete (2027): 17
- Guardian (2027): 12
- Times / Sunday Times (2027): 10

Global rankings
- ARWU (2026): 91
- QS (2027): 57
- THE (2026): 80=

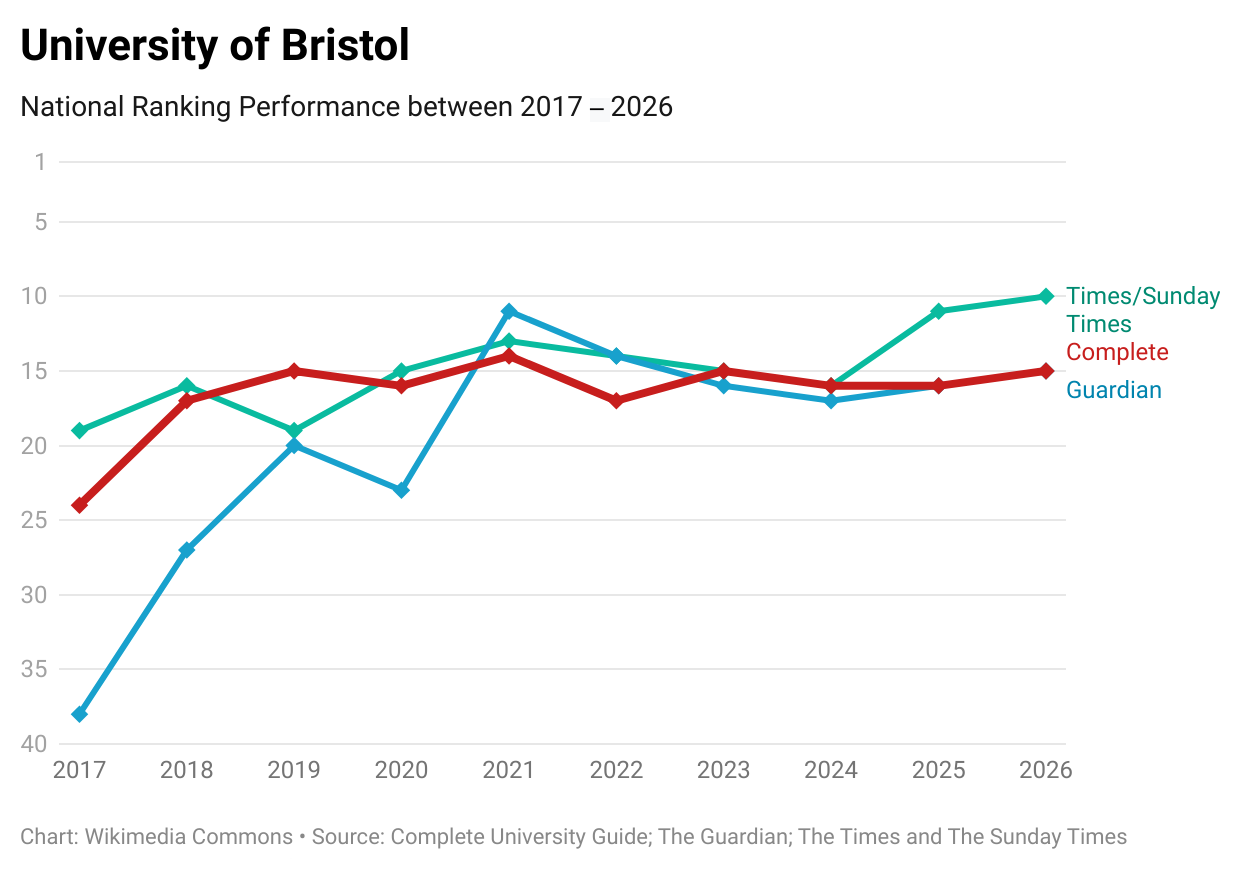
University of Bristol's national league table performance over the past ten years

The University of Bristol ranks number 5 in the UK for research quality according to the most recent Research Excellence Framework assessment. Chemistry (1st), Physics (5th), Engineering (6th), Mathematical sciences (4th), Computer science and informatics (7th), Earth systems and environmental sciences (2nd), Biological sciences (8th), Geography and environmental studies (1st), Law (3rd), Economics and econometrics (7th), and Modern languages and linguistics (4th) are among the highly rated subjects. The Complete University Guide 2024 ranks Bristol 4th for the quality of its research. Bristol also ranks 5th for number of spin outs created and has the best business incubator in the world according to UBI Global.

The University of Bristol was the fourth most targeted university by the UK's top 100 employers, according to the Graduate Market in 2023 report produced by High Fliers. It was ranked joint 7th in the UK for graduate employability.

Internationally, in 2026, Bristol was ranked 6th in the UK and 35th in the world universities ranking by Time magazine and Statista. The 2024 QS World University Rankings placed Bristol at 55th overall in the world and 9th in the UK. The Times Higher Education World University Ranking placed Bristol at 76th globally and 9th in the UK in 2023. Another international ranking, the Shanghai Jiao Tong University Academic Ranking of World Universities, placed Bristol 88th globally and 8th in the UK in 2023.

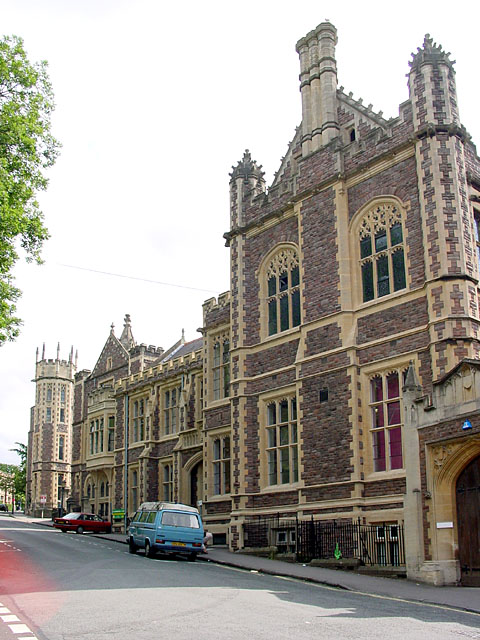
School of Geographical Sciences

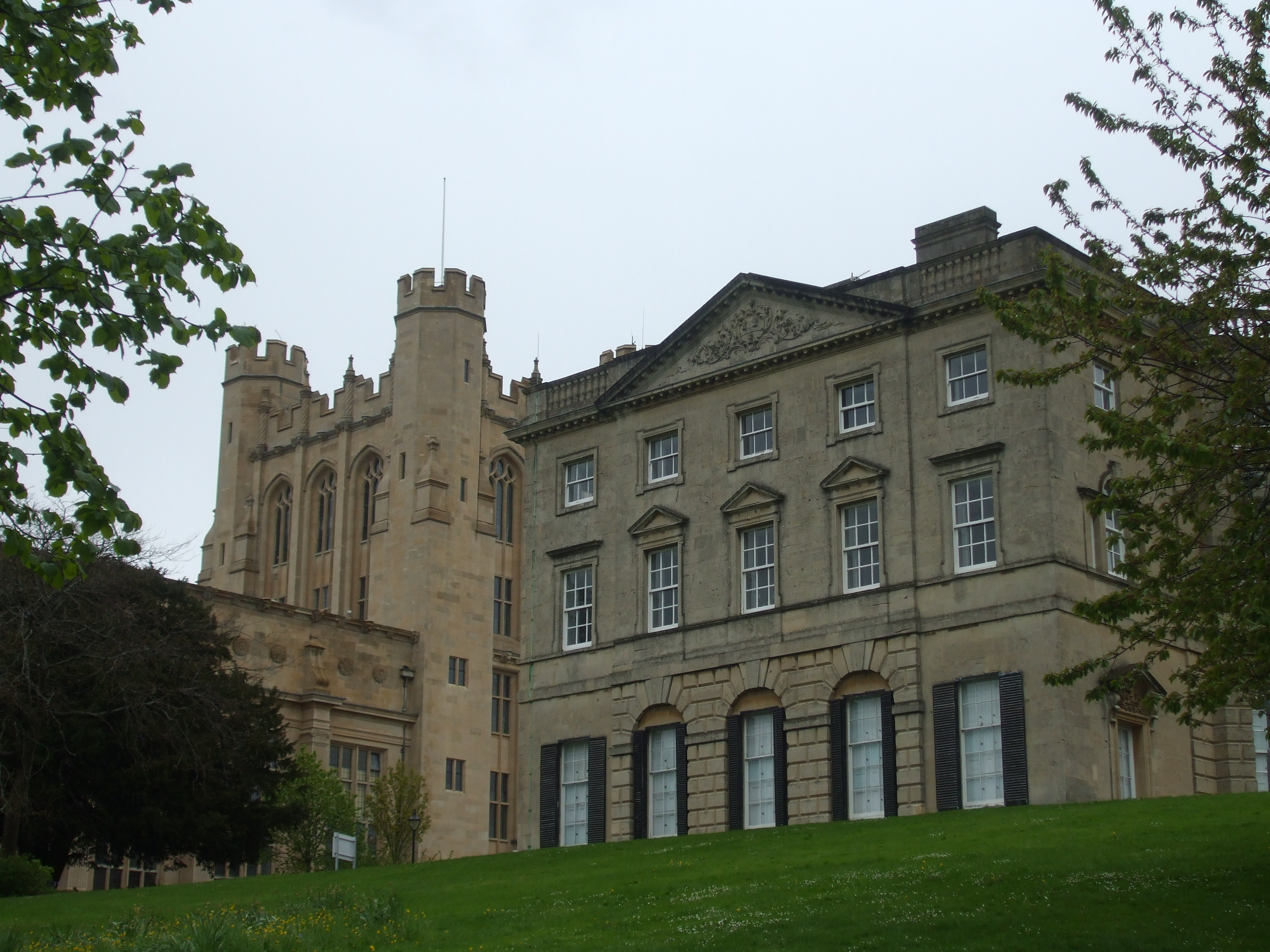
Royal Fort and the Physics department

== Publishing and commercial activities ==
=== Bristol University Press ===
Bristol University Press is a scholarly press based at the University of Bristol. In 1996, Alison Shaw founded Policy Press at the University of Bristol, as an academic publisher based in the Faculty of Social Sciences and Law and specialising in the social sciences. In October 2016, Policy Press became an imprint of the newly founded Bristol University Press.

It is not-for-profit university press which publishes 22 journals and 200 books a year in subjects including: Ageing and Gerontology, Business and Management, Criminology, Economics and Society, Environment and Sustainability, International Development, Law, Politics and International Relations, Science, Technology and Society, and Sociology. It achieved journal citation metrics with gains in Journal Impact Factors and improved results in Journal Citation Indicator, Scopus CiteScore and SJR.

=== Bristol is Open ===
Bristol is Open, abbreviated as BiO, is a joint venture project between Bristol City Council and University of Bristol. It is for delivering research contributing to the development of a Smart City and deploying a city-scale open and programmable testbed for experimentation and digital innovation. The collaboration of two organisations started in April 2015 and ended in December 2019 with Bristol City Council taking full control of BiO's operations. It has completed many technical trials and experiments including open access to Wi-Fi as a reduction of the digital divide and development for Smart City technology.

== Student life ==
=== Students' Union ===
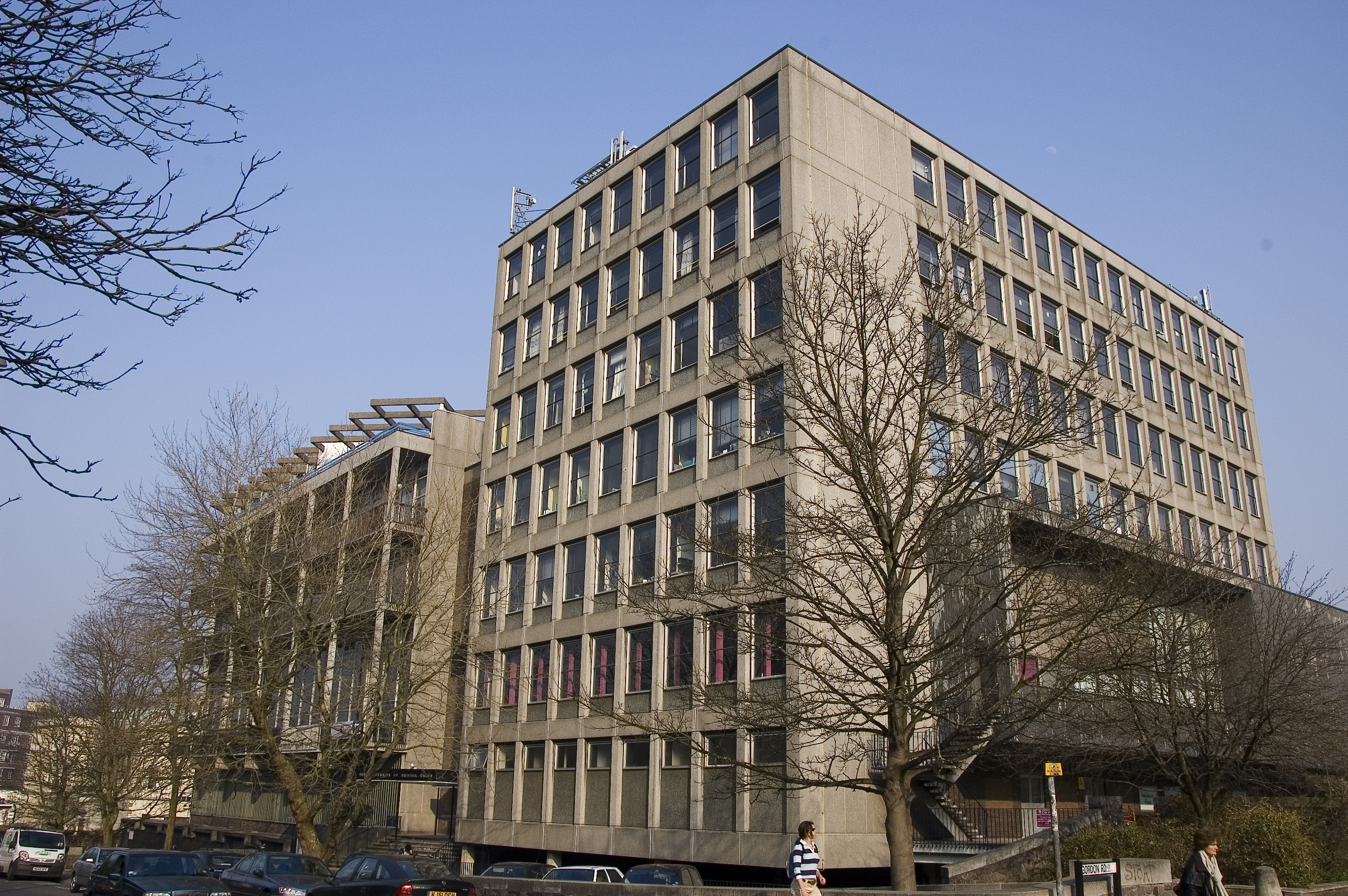
University of Bristol Union building

The University of Bristol Students' Union (Bristol SU) located in Senate House and the Richmond Building on Queens Road is a founding member of the National Union of Students and is amongst the oldest students' unions in England. The union oversees three media outlets: UBTV, the Bristol University Radio Station (BURST) and the student newspaper Epigram. There is also a local branch of The Tab. The Union is responsible for representing students' academic interests through elections of student representatives and democratic events. The Union is also responsible for the organisation of the annual Welcome Fair, the co-ordination of Bristol Student Community Action, which organises volunteering projects in the local community, and the organisation of entertainment events and over 400 student groups, societies and clubs. Previous presidents have included Sue Lawley and former Liberal Democrat MP Lembit Öpik. There is a separate union for postgraduate students, as well as an athletic union, which is a member of the British Universities & Colleges Sport. In distinction to the "blues" awarded for sporting excellence at Oxford and Cambridge, Bristol's most successful athletes are awarded "reds".

=== Halls of residence ===
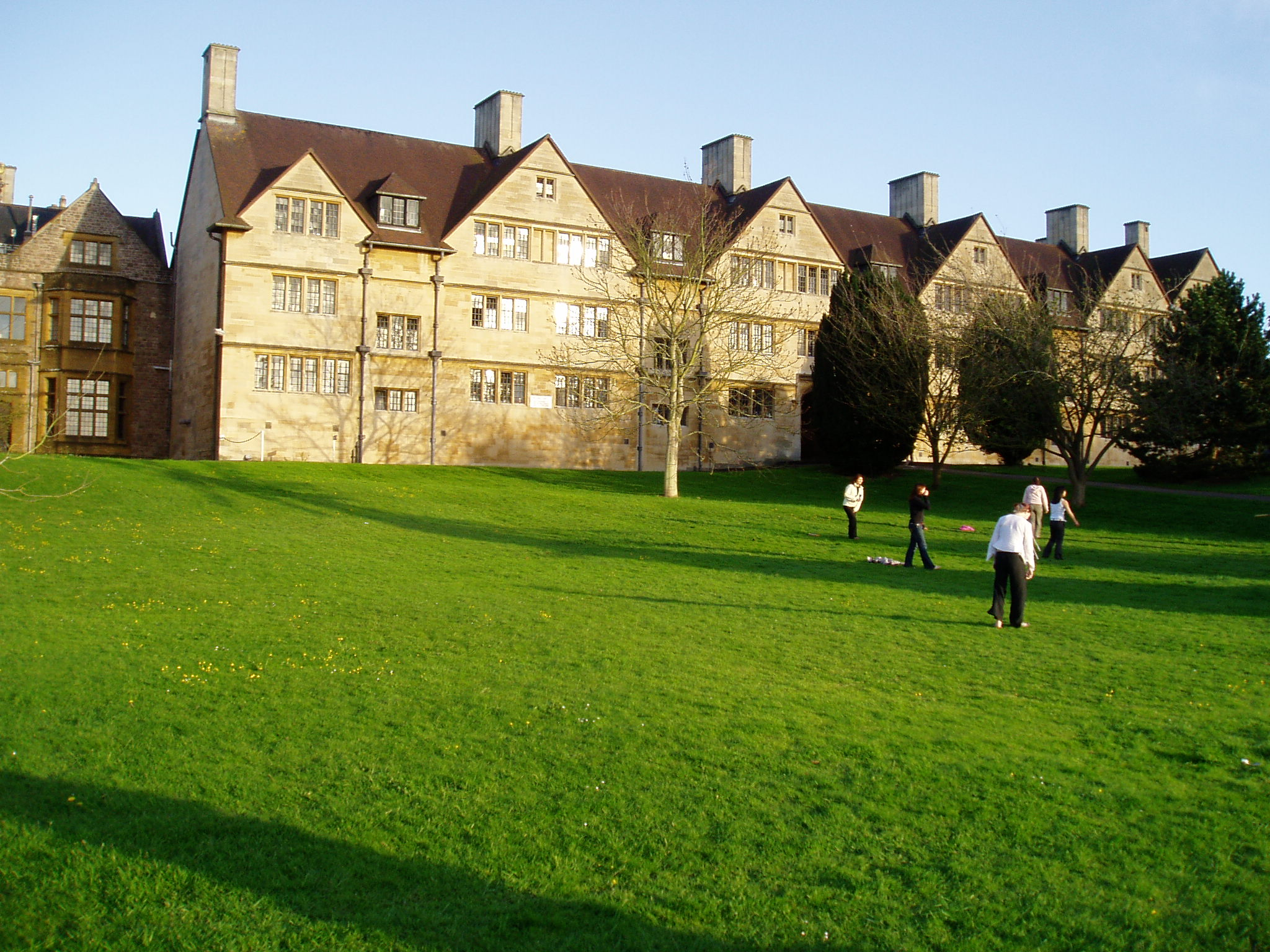
Wills Hall

Accommodation for students is primarily in the central precinct of the university and two areas of Bristol: Clifton and Stoke Bishop, known respectively as the West and North Villages.

In Stoke Bishop, Wills Hall on the edge of the Clifton Downs was the first to be opened, in 1929, by the then chancellor, Winston Churchill. Its original quadrangle layout has been expanded twice, in 1962 and 1990. Churchill Hall, named for the chancellor, followed in 1956, then Badock Hall in 1964. At the time of Badock Hall's establishment, some of the buildings were called Hiatt Baker Hall, but two years later, Hiatt Baker moved to its own site and is now the largest hall in the university. The first self-catering hall in Stoke Bishop was University Hall, established in 1971 with expansion in 1992.

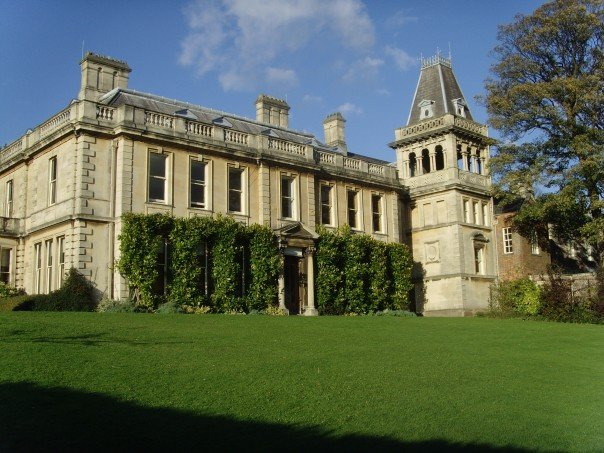
Goldney Hall

In Clifton, Goldney Hall was built first in the early 18th century by the wealthy merchant Goldney family and eventually became part of the university in 1956. It is a popular location for filming, with The Chronicles of Narnia, The House of Eliott and Truly, Madly, Deeply, as well as episodes of Only Fools and Horses and Casualty, being filmed there. The Grotto in the grounds is a Grade I listed building. Clifton Hill House is another Grade I listed building now used as student accommodation in Clifton. The original building was constructed between 1745 and 1750 by Isaac Ware, and has been used by the university since its earliest days in 1909. Manor Hall comprises five separate buildings, the principal of which was erected from 1927 to 1932 to the design of George Oatley following a donation from Henry Herbert Wills. Manor Hall houses the largest and most dated rooms, some dating back to the early 20th century. One of its annexes, Manor House, has recently been refurbished and officially 'reopened' in 1999.

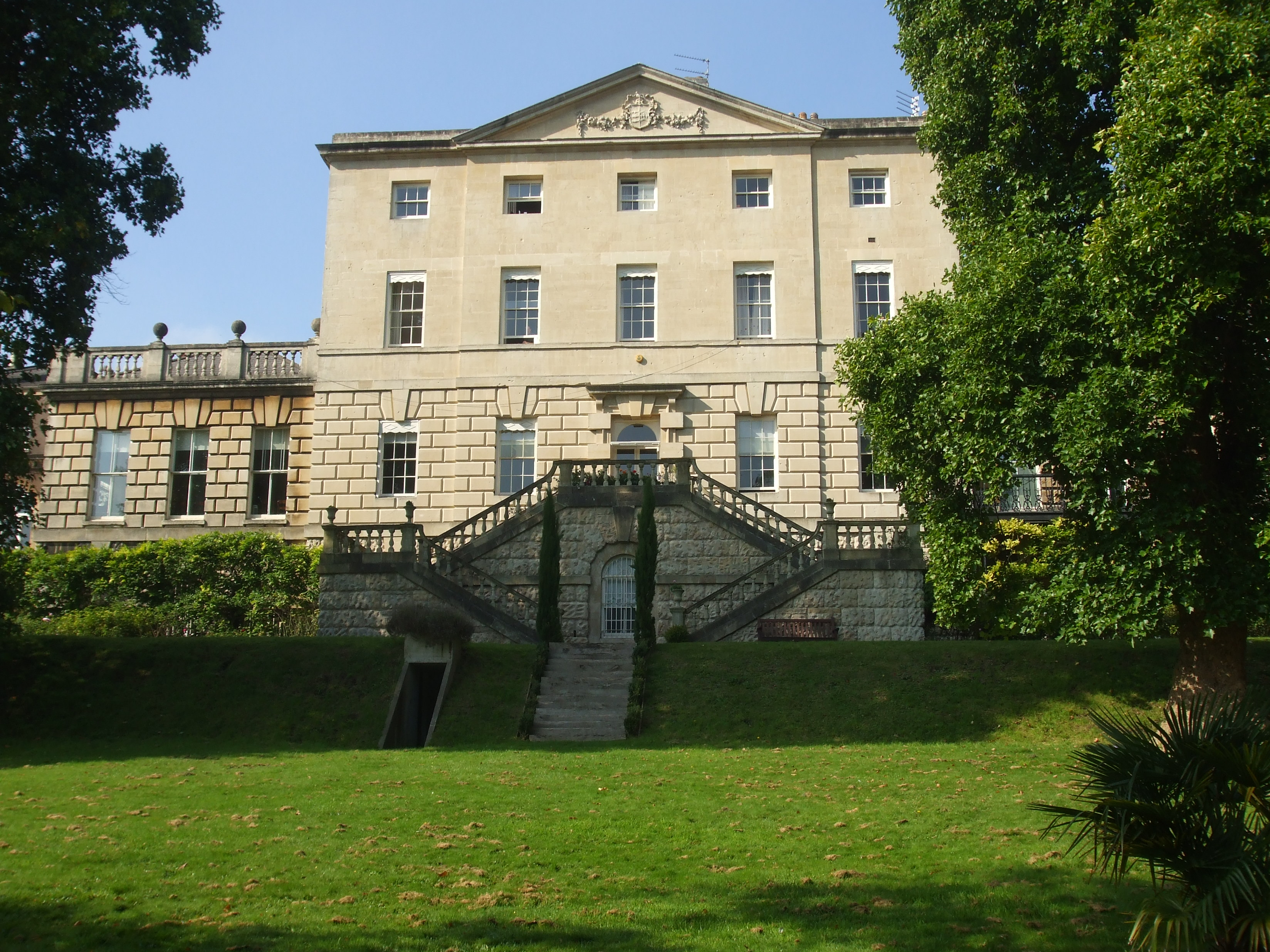
Clifton Hill House

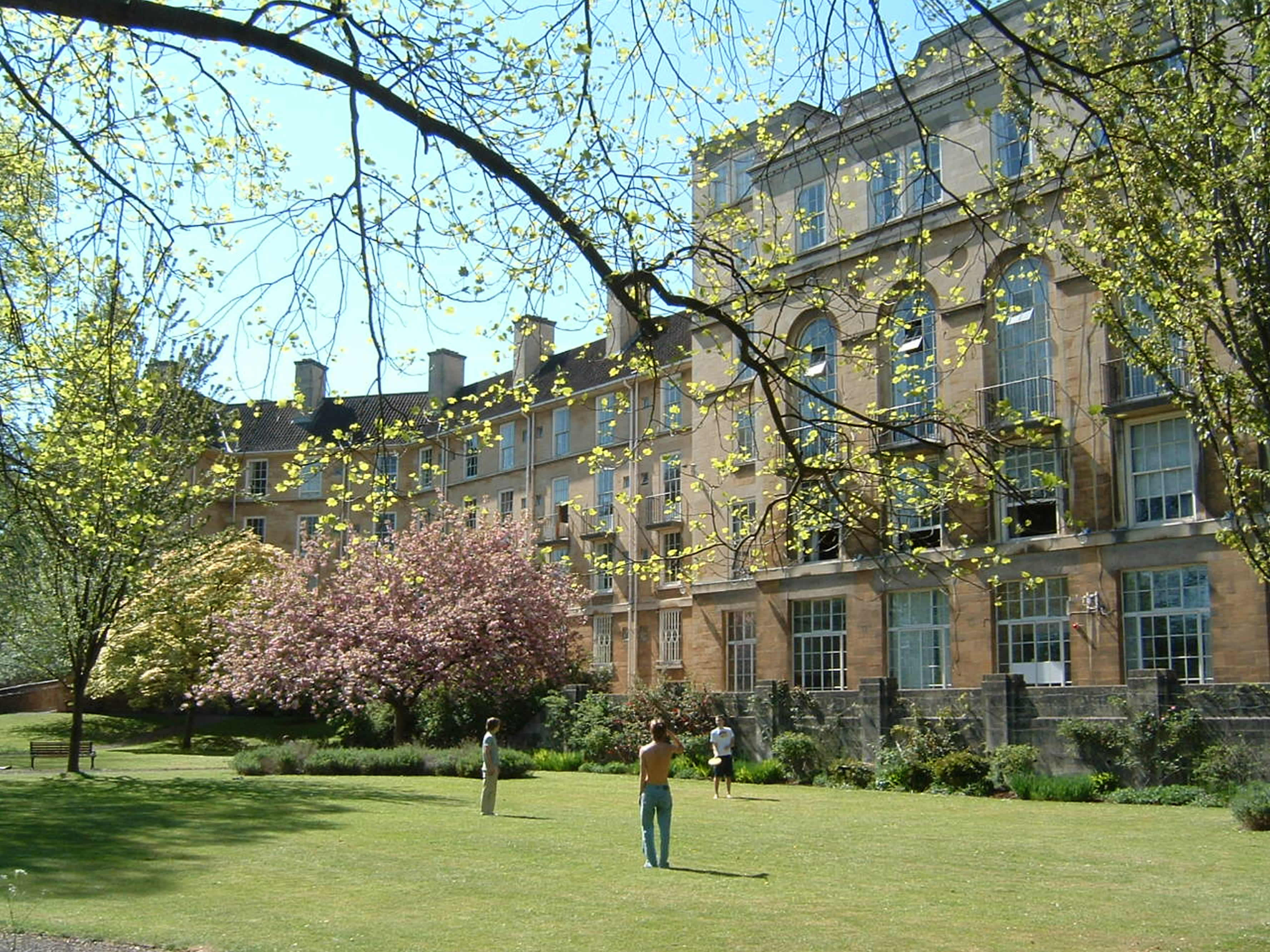
Manor Hall

On the central precinct sits The Hawthorns, a student house accommodating 115 undergraduate students. The house started life as a collection of villas built somewhere between 1888 and 1924 that were later converted, bit by bit, into a hotel by John Dingle. The Hawthorns also houses conferencing facilities, the staff refectory and bar, the Accommodation Office and the Student Houses Office. 33 Colston Street was opened in the city centre in October 2011 after the university acquired the property in 2009.

Several of the residences in the central precinct are more recent and have been built and are managed by third-party organisations under exclusivity arrangements with the university. New Bridewell House, opened in 2016, is in the former police HQ, and is operated by Fresh Student Housing. Unite House and Chantry Court, were opened in 2000 and 2003 respectively by the UNITE Group. Dean's Court (2001, postgraduates only) and Woodland Court (2005), are both run by the Dominion Housing Group.

All of the main halls elect groups of students to the Junior Common Room to organise the halls social calendar for the next year. Residents of student houses, private accommodation and students living at home become members of Orbital – a society organising social events for students throughout the year.

=== Sport ===
Sports membership at Bristol University totals up to 4,000 students across a wide range of unique team and individual pursuits. Its network of over 70 sports clubs and four sites are run by the university's Student Union and its Sport, Exercise and Health Department. Competing with other universities in the British Universities and Colleges Sport league (BUCS), Bristol university is placed 8th in the country.

The university caters to its students with sporting facilities split across four primary complexes:

Bristol University Indoor Sports Centre- The Indoor Sports Centre is located at the heart of the university campus and is home to a fully equipped two-storey gym, fitness studios, sports hall and Sports Medicine Clinic.

Coombe Dingle Sports Complex- This 38-acre site in the heart of Stoke Bishop, features the only indoor tennis centre in Bristol and is where the university's more traditional outdoor sports reside. Coombe Dingle is typically used for training and competition. Throughout the year Coombe Dingle hosts a variety of competitive fixtures, including inter-university BUCS matches, plus local and national league matches.:

Facilities available at Coombe Dingle Sports Complex: • 3G pitch • Artificial pitches (sand dressed and floodlit) • Grass pitches (football and rugby) • Cricket squares and nets (including grass) • Tennis courts, indoor and outdoor (floodlit) • Lacrosse pitch • Netball courts (outdoor) • Olympic weight lifting gym • Softball and rounders facilities • Pavilion, lounge bar and meeting rooms • Sports Medicine Clinic

Richmond Building- The university swimming pool is located inside the student union (Richmond Building). This six-lane swimming pool has a moveable bulkhead, creating a competition-length main pool, alongside a comfortable teaching pool for lessons. The pool is available to students, staff and the community for lane and casual swimming, or lessons, on a membership or pay-as-you-go basis.

Saltford Boathouse- The University Boathouse is based at Saltford, halfway to Bath on the River Avon. Used for term-time training/competition and out-of-term recreational water sport, the Boathouse moors up the universities rowing and sailing boats.

== Notable people ==
=== Academics ===
Current academics at the University of Bristol include 23 fellows of the Academy of Medical Sciences, 13 fellows of the British Academy, 13 fellows of the Royal Academy of Engineering, 44 fellows of the Academy of Social Sciences and 48 fellows of the Royal Society. These include, Sir Michael Berry, one of the discoverers of quantum mechanics' "geometric phase", John Rarity international expert on quantum optics, quantum cryptography and quantum communication, David May, computer scientist and lead architect for the transputer, Mark Horton, a British maritime and historical archaeologist, Bruce Hood, a world-leading experimental psychologist, and Tom Crick, a UK Government Chief Scientific Adviser.

Past academics of the university include, Patricia Broadfoot, vice-chancellor of the University of Gloucestershire, Nigel Thrift, vice-chancellor of the University of Warwick, and Wendy Larner, provost of Victoria University of Wellington. Anthony Epstein, co-discoverer of the Epstein-Barr virus, was Professor of Pathology at the university from 1968 to 1982, Sir John Lennard-Jones, discoverer of the Lennard-Jones potential in physics and Alfred Marshall, one of the University College's principals and influential economist in the latter part of the 19th century. Mathematicians and philosophers Rohit Parikh and Brian Rotman lectured in the mathematics department, and philosophers of science Paul Feyerabend and Alexander Bird taught in the department of philosophy. Another notable current academic in the department of philosophy includes Havi Carel. Notable mathematicians who have worked in the department of mathematics include Hannes Leitgeb, Philip Welch, Ben Green, Andrew Booker, Julia Wolf, Jens Marklof, John McNamara, Howell Peregrine, Christopher Budd John Hogan, Jeremy Rickard, Richard Jozsa, Corinna Ulcigrai, David Evans and the statistician Harvey Goldstein.

The University of Bristol is associated with three Ig Nobel Prizes, an award for unusual or trivial achievements in scientific research. Sir Michael Berry shared the award (with Andre Geim, a Nobel Laureate) for using magnets to levitate a frog. Gareth Jones also shared an Ig Nobel prize for scientifically documenting fellatio in fruit bats. Dr. Len Fisher was awarded the 1999 prize for physics for calculating the optimal way to dunk a biscuit.

=== Alumni ===
Notable Bristol alumni include:

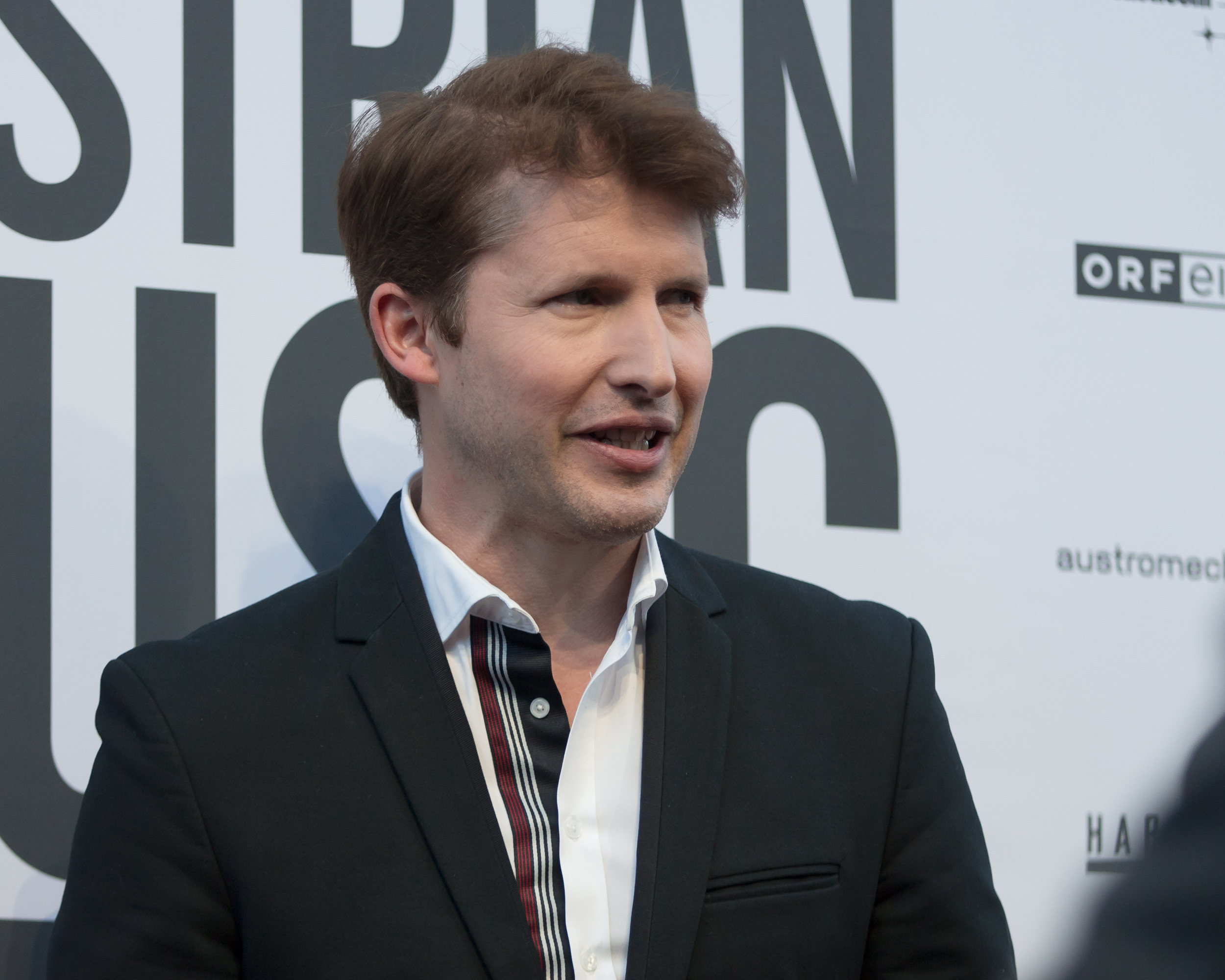
James Blunt, musician

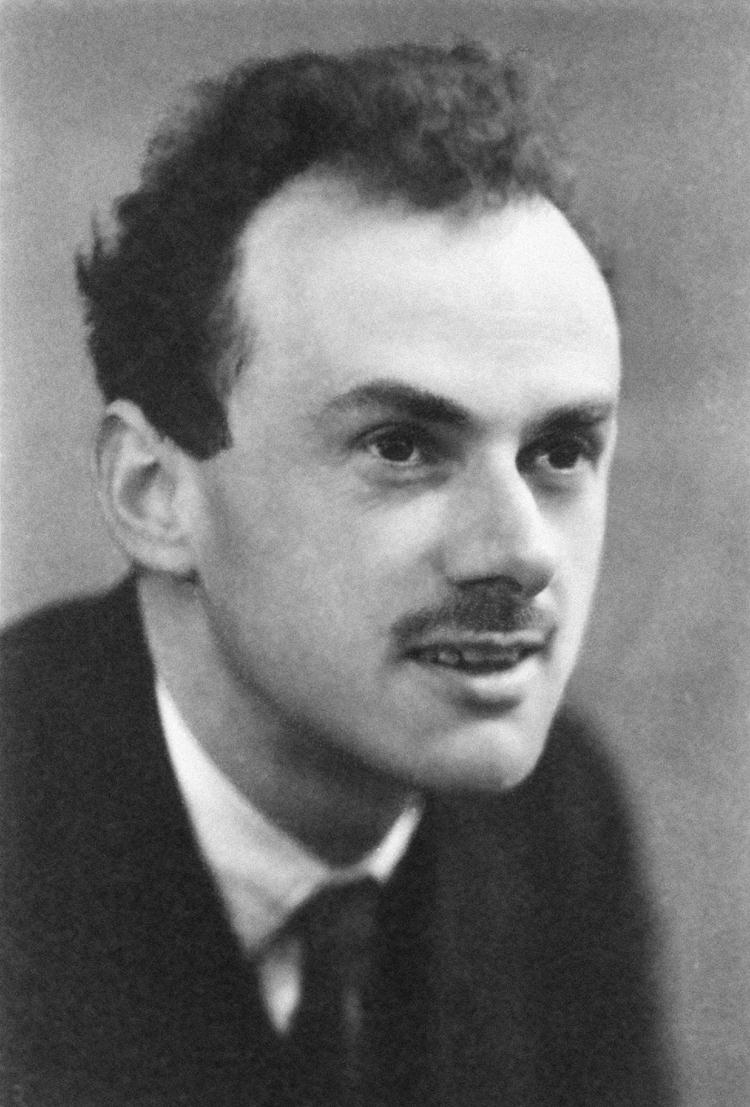
Paul Dirac, physicist

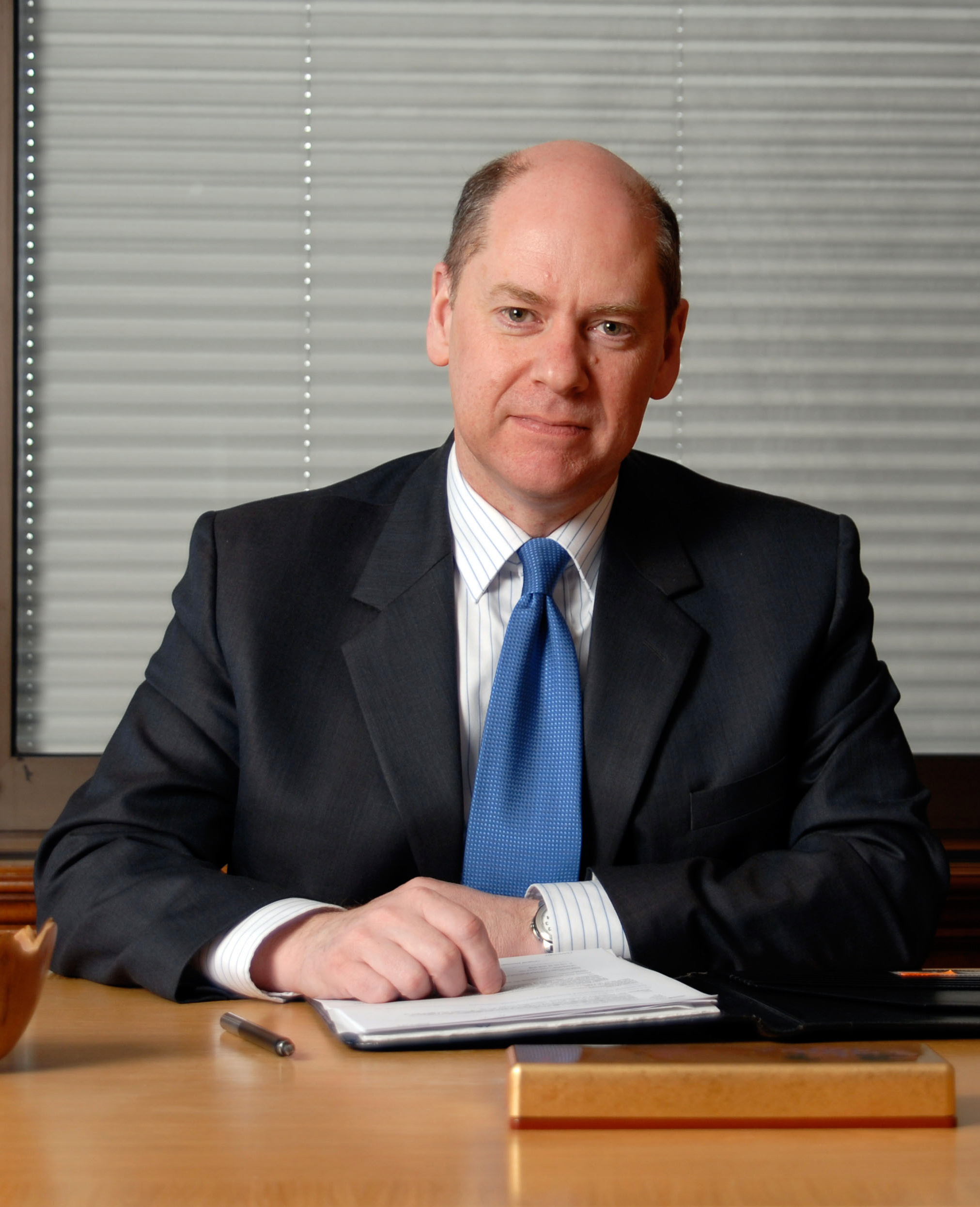
Jonathan Evans, former head of MI5

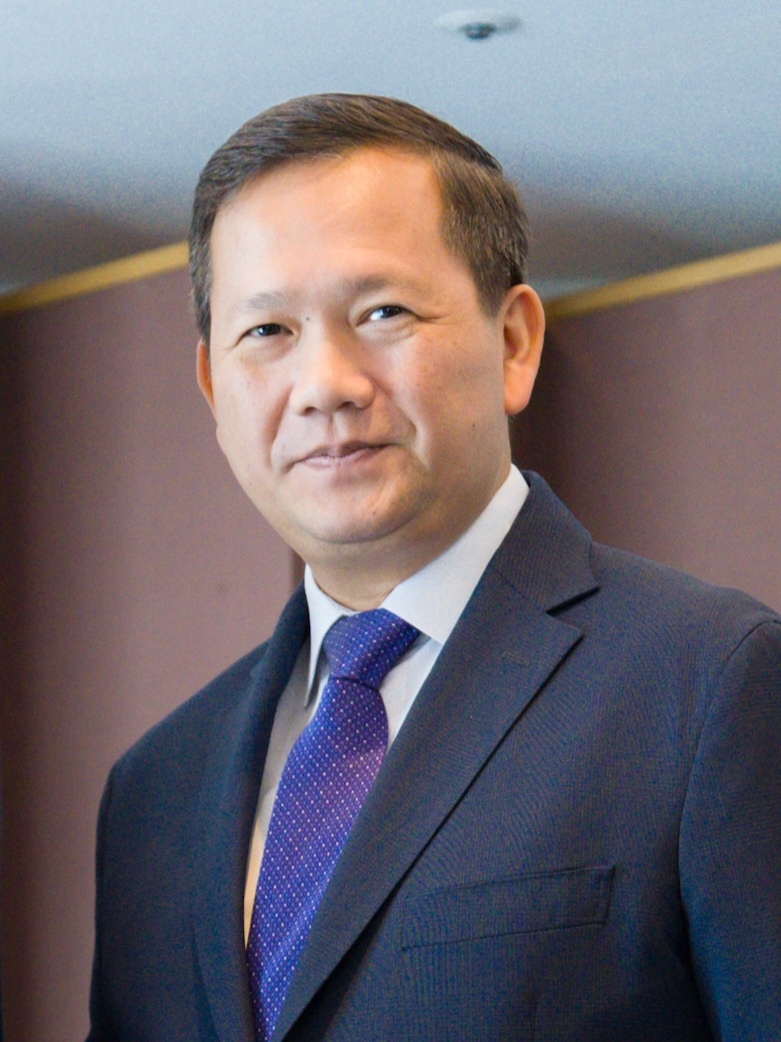
Hun Manet, Prime Minister of Cambodia

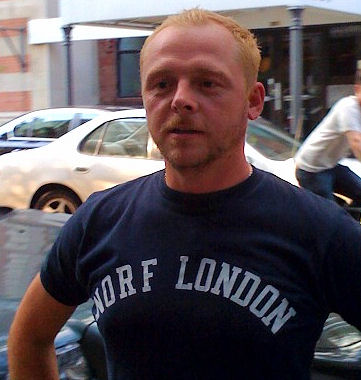
Simon Pegg, actor and writer

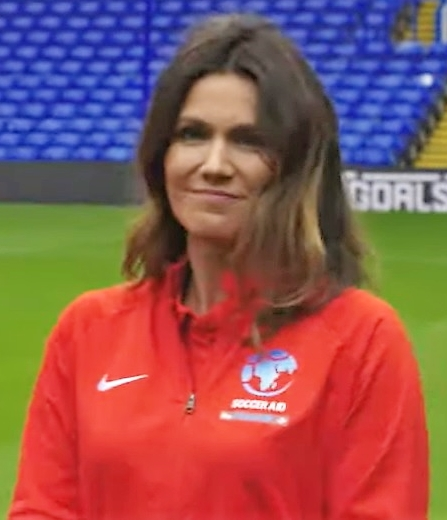
Susanna Reid, TV journalist

Bristol alumnus Paul Dirac went on to win the Nobel Prize in Physics in 1933 for his contribution to the formulation of quantum mechanics and is considered one of the most significant physicists of the 20th century. Other notable scientists include Dani Rabaiotti, an environmental scientist and science communicator, and Eliahu Nissim, a professor of aeronautical engineering, and the president of the Open University of Israel.

Writers to have studied at Bristol include Dick King-Smith; Sarah Kane; Angela Carter; Dorothy Simpson; David Gibbins; Julia Donaldson; Olivier award-winning playwright Laura Wade; Maddie Mortimer; Holly Smale; and David Nicholls, author of the novel Starter for Ten, turned into a screenplay set in the University of Bristol.

In government and politics, notable alumni include Albert II, Prince of Monaco; George Odlum, former Deputy Prime Minister of Saint Lucia, and first Afro-Caribbean president of the Bristol University Students' Union; Prime Minister Hun Manet of Cambodia; former Liberal Democrat MP Lembit Öpik, who was president of Bristol University Students' Union; Sir Jonathan Evans, former head of MI5; Nkosazana Dlamini-Zuma, Chairperson of the African Union Commission from October 2012 to January 2017; Karen Ramagge Prescott, the first female Speaker of the Gibraltar Parliament and Paul Boateng, the UK's first Black Cabinet Minister.

In current affairs, former students include journalist and McMafia author Misha Glenny; BBC News Chief Political Correspondent James Landale (who founded the university independent newspaper Epigram); author and journalist Julie Myerson; editor-in-chief of the Telegraph Media Group William Lewis; editor-in-chief of The Observer Will Hutton; Radio 4 presenter Sue Lawley; newsreader Alastair Stewart; and Sky News US Correspondent Dominic Waghorn. BBC Breakfast and Good Morning Britain anchor Susanna Reid was an editor of Epigram.

In entertainment, former students include rapper Shygirl; singer James Blunt; illusionist Derren Brown; comedians Jon Richardson, Marcus Brigstocke (who did not graduate), Matt Lucas and David Walliams; actors Simon Pegg, Jason Isaacs, and Pearl Mackie; anime YouTuber Gigguk; Brass Eye creator Chris Morris; West End Composer and Lyricist Pippa Cleary and Stath Lets Flats creator Jamie Demetriou. Bridgerton actor Luke Thompson (actor) also attended the University.

Notable alumni from the Film and Television Production department include film directors Mick Jackson; Michael Winterbottom; Marc Evans; Christopher Smith; Alex Cox; Peter Webber; and Maddie Moate.

Other alumni include Anne McClain, member of the 2013 NASA Astronaut Class; mathematician Iain Gordon; long jumper Jazmin Sawyers; Luke Bond, an organist at Windsor Castle; baker Kim-Joy Hewlett; historian and author Jack Chesher.

== Gallery ==
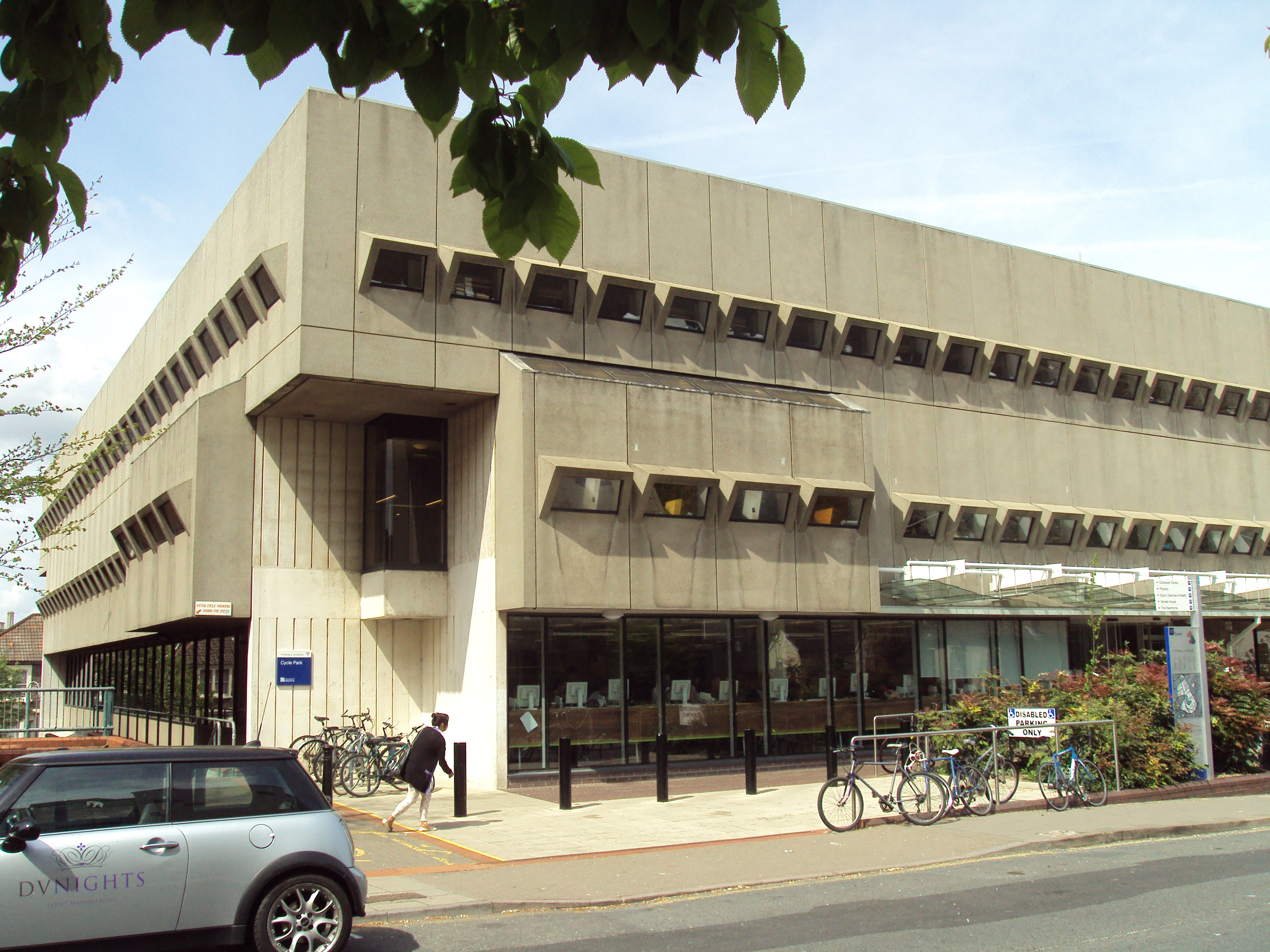
Library, Tyndall Avenue

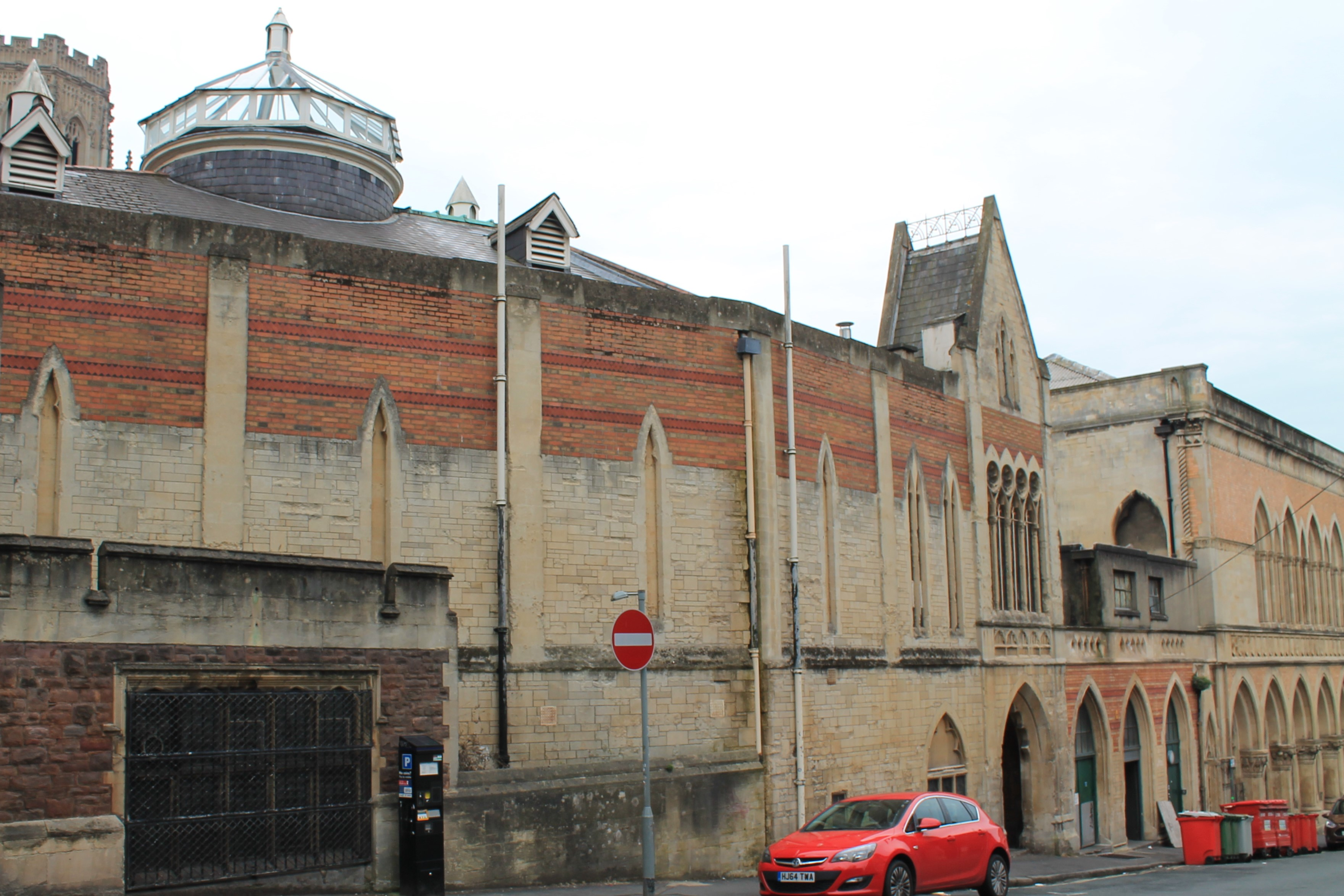
Museum Lecture Theatre

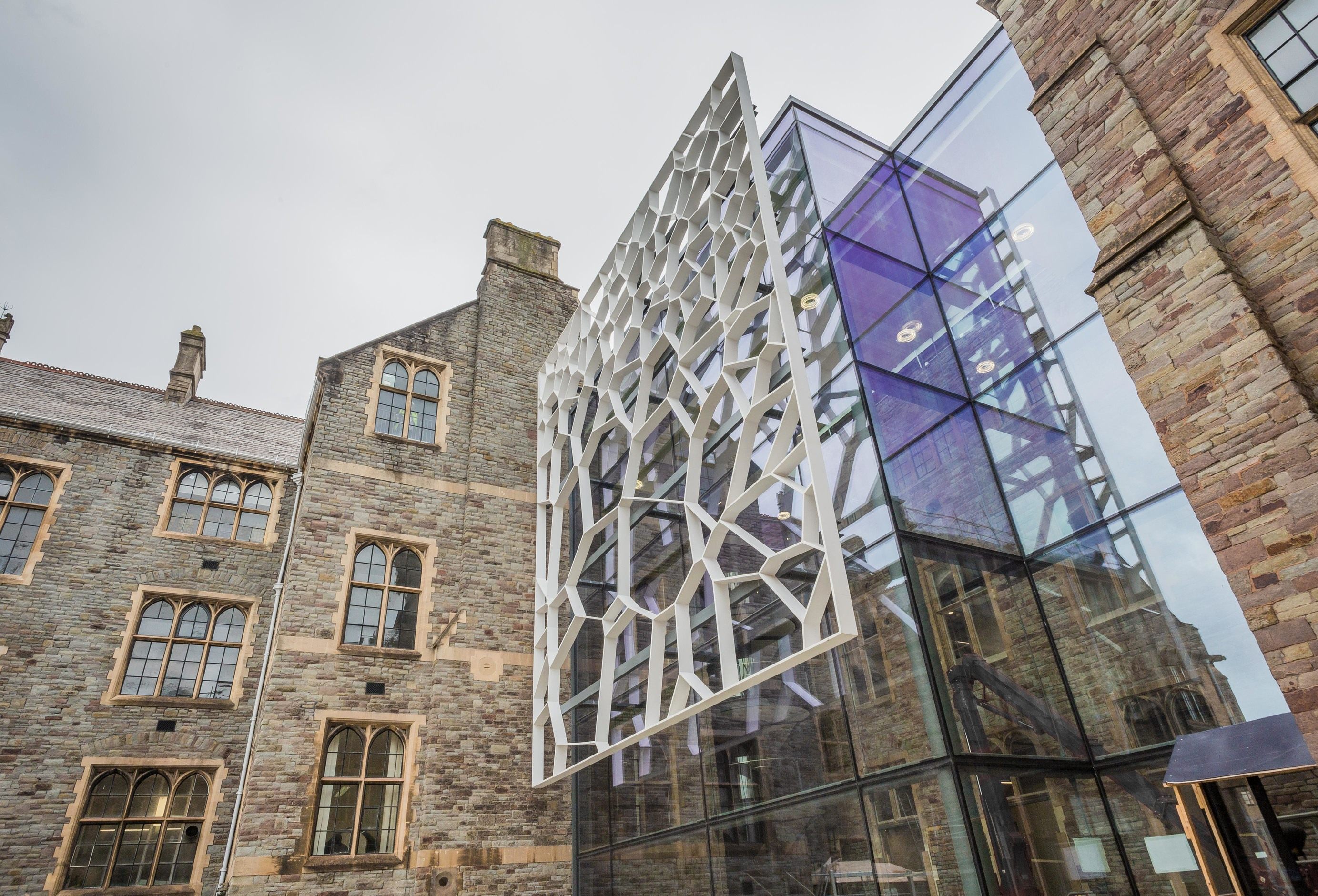
The Fry Building

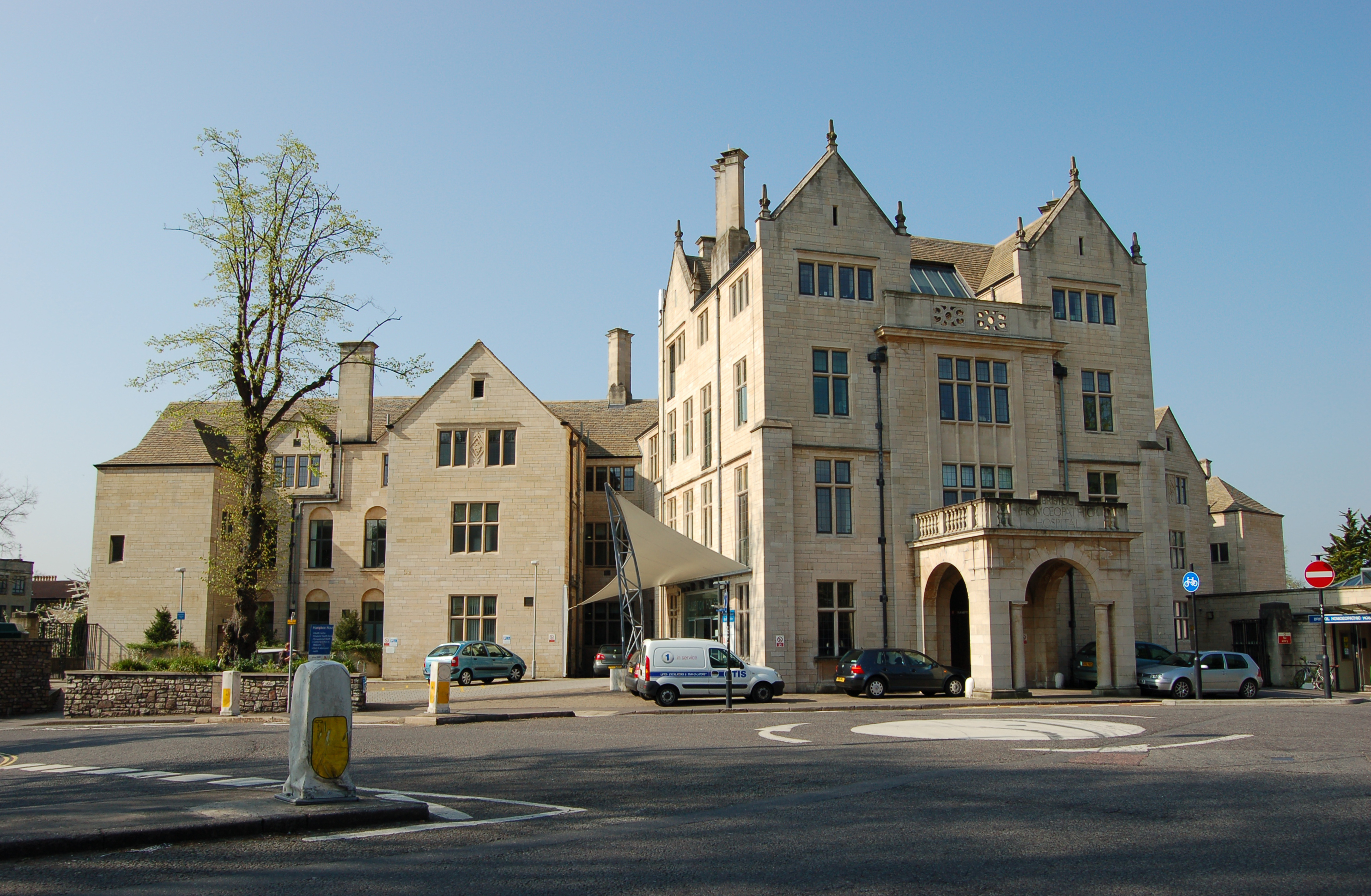
Hampton House

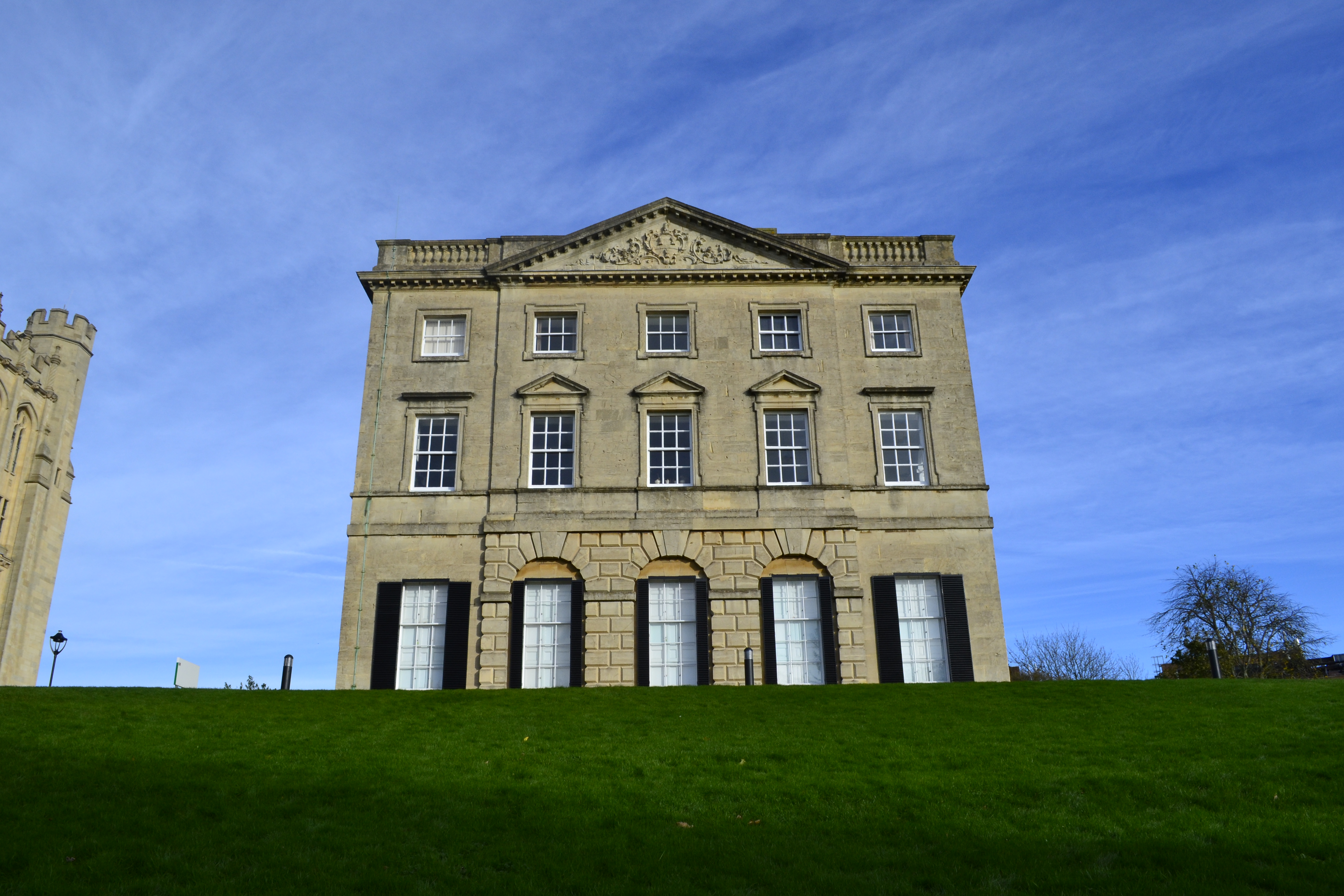
Royal Fort House

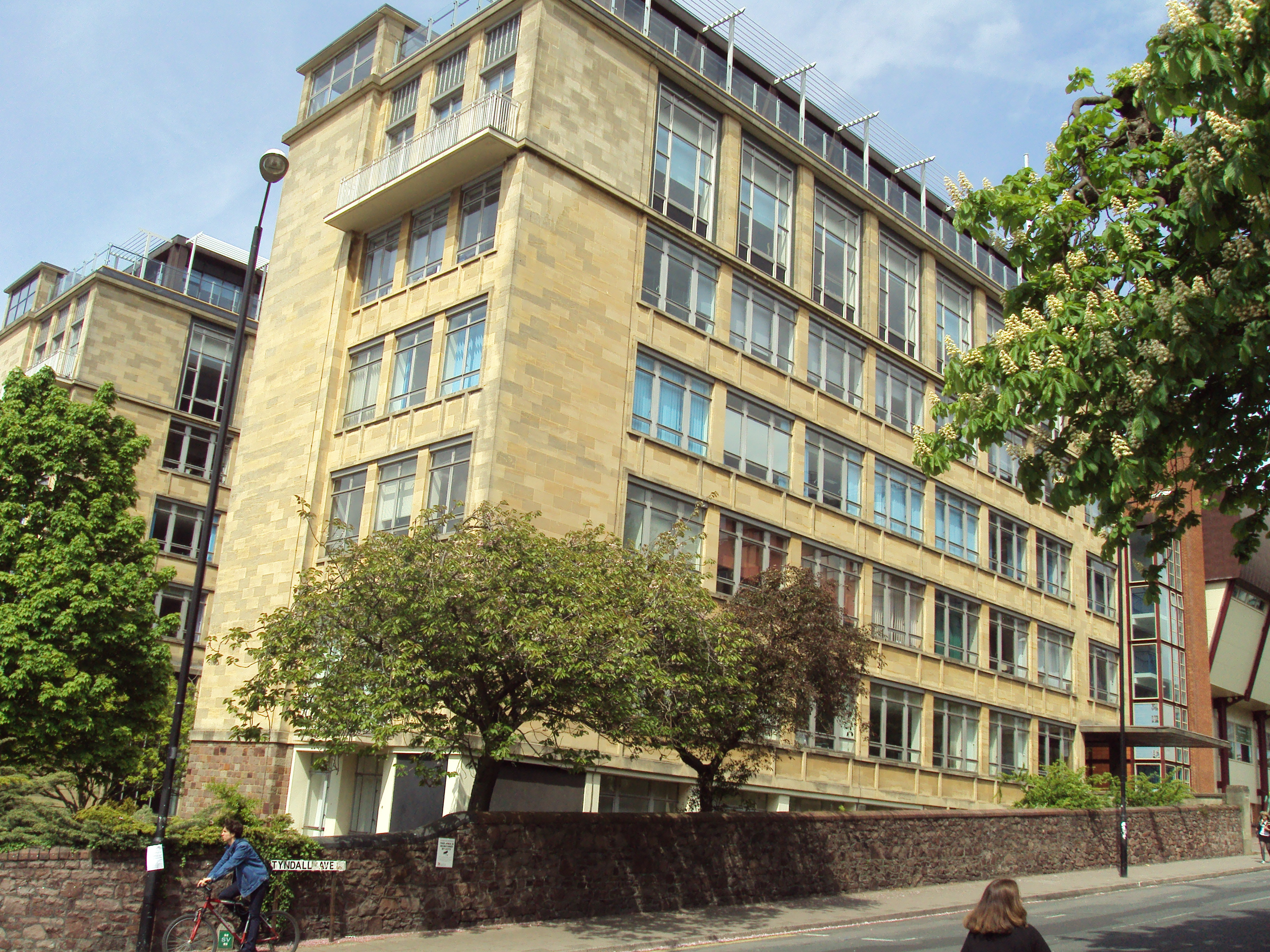
Senate House

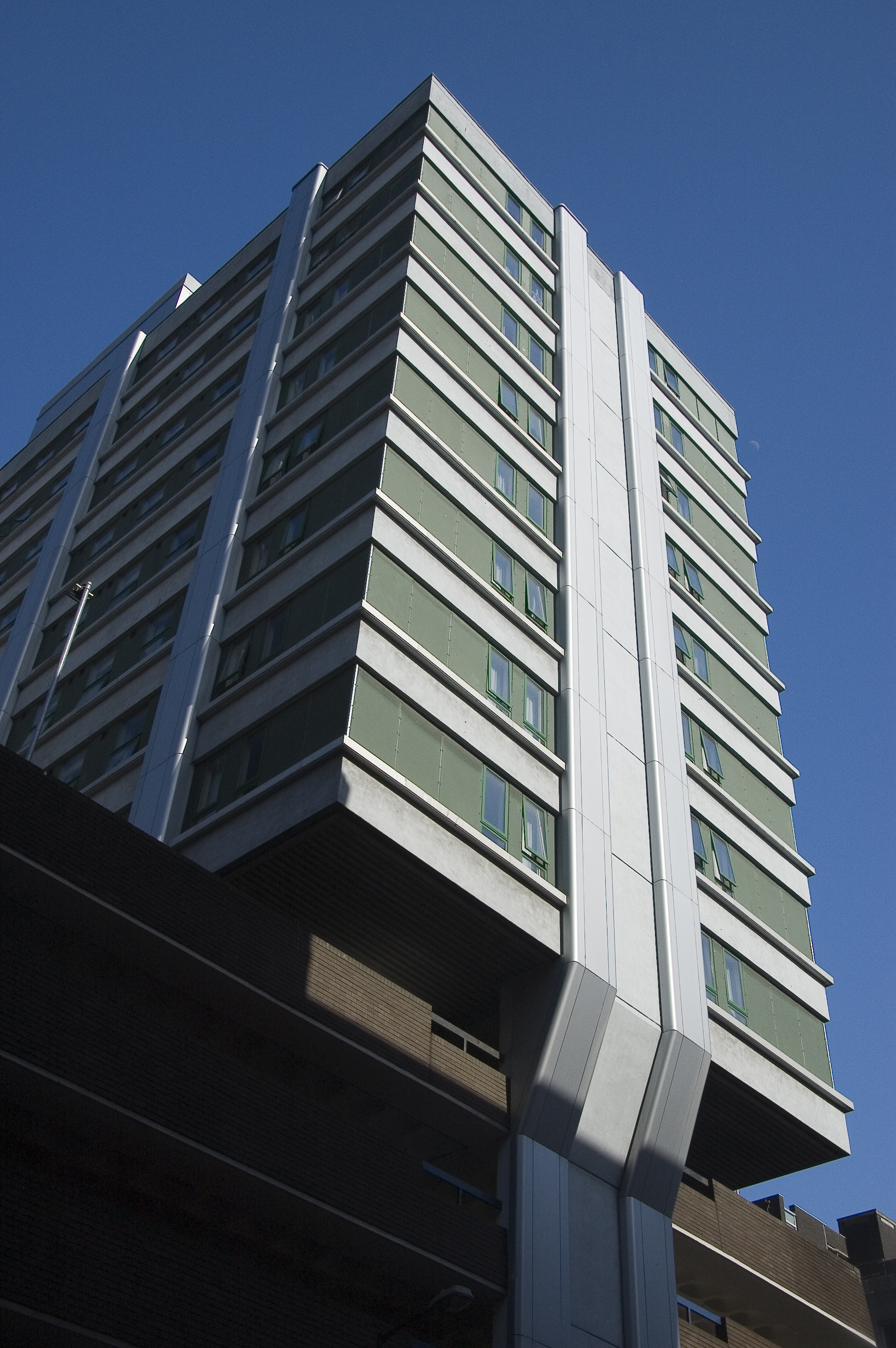
Waverley House

== See also ==
- Armorial of British universities
- CHOMBEC
- Education in Bristol
- List of modern universities in Europe (1801–1945)
- List of universities in the United Kingdom
- University of Bristol Theatre Collection
