= Henry Overton Wills I =

W.D. & H.O. Wills Founder

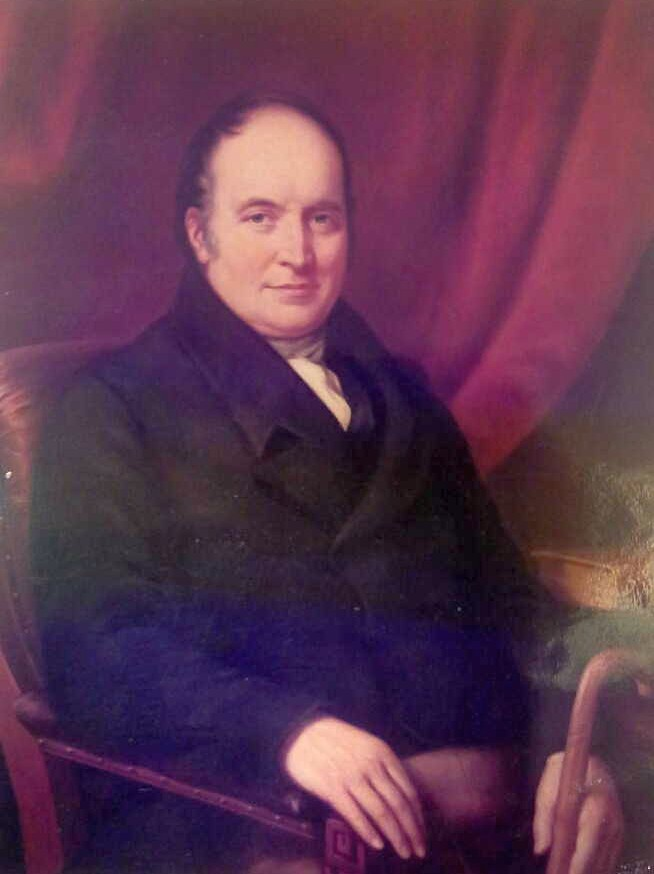
Henry Overton Wills I

Henry Overton Wills I (2 March 1761 – 1826) was a British merchant who founded the firm of W.D. & H.O. Wills in Bristol, England, which eventually became one of the largest tobacco companies in late 19th-century Britain, and later became the largest constituent part of Imperial Tobacco. The 1966 Guinness Book of Records named the Wills family, descended from him, as containing the largest number of millionaires in the British Isles, of which 14 left estates in excess of one million pounds since 1910, totalling 55 million, of which 27 million was paid in death duties. Wills is said to have been a non-smoker, despite the fact that he is regarded as one of the founders of the British tobacco industry.

== Origins ==
He was born on 2 March 1761 in Salisbury, England, the son of Edmund Wills, a watchmaker, and his wife Rebecca, daughter of Henry Overton of Andover, Hampshire.

== Career ==
He came as a young man by coach from Salisbury to Bristol where he formed a partnership with Samuel Watkins to open a tobacco shop on 73 Castle Street, Bristol. They named their operation Wills, Watkins & Co. When Watkins retired from the business in 1789, it became Wills & Co, with Wills as sole proprietor. He soon found new partners, and the company merged in 1791 with the firm of Peter Lilly, which had a mill to grind tobacco into snuff. Lilly and Wills named the new company Lilly, Wills & Co, and they consolidated the operations into Lilly's shop at 111–12 Redcliff Street, Bristol. In 1793 the company name was simplified to Lilly and Wills. When Lilly retired in 1803, he was replaced by Samuel Ditchett, and the firm became Wills and Ditchett.

Wills' partnership with Lilly proved to be profitable, and the company in 1804 was valued at £15,435 (2017 value: $1.67 million U.S.). In 1819 they again changed the name of their firm, to Wills, Ditchett & Co., Wills by this time having brought into the operation his sons William Day Wills and Henry Overton Wills II, first as apprentices and later as junior partners.

He continued to be involved in the firm until his death on 1 December 1826 in Bristol, when his sons took over their father's interest in the business. They subsequently became senior partners of the company in 1830 when their father's partner Samuel Ditchett retired, and they renamed the company W.D. & H.O. Wills, which grew to become one of the largest tobacco importers in Victorian England.

== Religious and political activity ==
He raised his children in the strict Congregationalist faith, and his descendants actively supported the church in Bristol for more than a century. His sons were particularly generous in their support for non-conformist religious causes. The Wills family were also active in local politics, both by supporting the Liberal Party and by standing themselves for election to city offices as Liberal candidates.

== Marriage and children ==
On 24 June 1790, when he was the sole proprietor in his tobacco venture, in Bristol he married Anne Day, eldest daughter of William Day of Bristol, a linen draper. By Anne he had the following two sons:

- William Day Wills (1797–1865), eldest son, who in 1830 with his brother co-founded W.D. & H.O. Wills, a company that by the late 1800s became the largest importer of tobacco, and manufacturer of tobacco products in Britain. His son William Wills, 1st Baron Winterstoke became the first chairman of Imperial Tobacco.
- Henry Overton Wills II ( 1800–1871), with his brother was a co-founder of W.D.& H.O. Wills. His son Henry Overton Wills III founded the creation of the University of Bristol and became its first Chancellor, and two of his other sons Sir Edward Payson Wills and Sir Frederick Wills became baronets. Another son, Sir Frank William Wills became a noted architect, who was knighted for his accomplishments.

Select male descendants of Henry Overton Wills I
- Henry Overton Wills I (1761—1826)
  - William Day Wills (1797—1865)
    - William Henry Wills, 1st Baron Winterstoke (1830—1911)
  - Henry Overton Wills II (1800—1871)
    - Henry Overton Wills III (1828—1911) Founding Chancellor of the University of Bristol
      - Sir George Alfred Wills of Blagdon, 1st Baronet (1854—1928)
        - Sir George Vernon Proctor Wills, 2nd Baronet (1887—1931)
          - Sir George Peter Vernon Wills, 3rd Baronet (1922—1945)
          - Sir John Vernon Wills, 4th Baronet (1928—1998)
            - Sir David James Vernon Wills, 5th Baronet (born 1955)
            - (1) Anthony John Vernon Wills (b. 1956)
              - (2) George Edward Vernon Wills (b. 1985)
              - (3) James Douglas Vernon Wills (b. 1987)
              - (4) Peter John Vernon Wills (b. 1989)
            - (5) Rupert Charles Vernon Wills (b. 1959)
              - (6) Harry James Vernon Wills (b. 1990)
              - (7) Thomas Edward Vernon Wills (b. 1992)
      - Henry Herbert Wills (1856—1922)
    - Sir Edward Payson Wills of Hazelwood, 1st Baronet (1834—1910)
      - Sir Edward Channing Wills, 2nd Baronet (1861—1921)
      - Sir Ernest Salter Wills, 3rd Baronet (1869—1958)
        - Lt.-Col. Sir Ernest Edward de Winton Wills, 4th Baronet (1903—1983)
        - Major George Seton Wills (1911—1979)
          - Sir David Seton Wills, 5th Baronet (1939—2023)
            - Sir James Seton Wills, 6th Baronet (b. 1970)
              - (1) Jack Seton Wills (born 2005)
      - Arnold Stancomb Wills (1877—1961)
        - Major John Lycett Wills (1910—1999)
          - Captain Andrew Arnold Lyon Wills (1937—1998)
            - (2) Richard Arnold Wills (b. 1962)
              - (3) Edward Henry Arnold Wills (b. 1994)
            - (4) Alexander John Wills (b. 1967)
              - (5) Oliver Andrew Wills (b. 2002)
              - (6) Benjamin Peter Wills (b. 2004)
    - Sir Frederick Wills of Northmoor and Manor Heath, 1st Baronet (1838—1909)
      - Gilbert Alan Hamilton Wills, 1st Baron Dulverton (1880—1956)
        - Frederick Anthony Hamilton Wills, 2nd Baron Dulverton (1915—1992)
          - Gilbert Michael Hamilton Wills, 3rd Baron Dulverton (born 1944)
            - (1) Hon. Robert Anthony Hamilton Wills (b. 1983)
          - (2) Hon. Robert Ian Hamilton Wills (b. 1948)
            - (3) James Douglas Hamilton Wills (b. 1984)
        - Hon. Victor Patrick Hamilton Wills (1926—2011)
          - (4) Christopher Aubrey Hamilton Wills (b. 1953)
            - (5) Thomas Robert Hamilton Wills (b. 1991)
            - (6) George Edmund Hamilton Wills (b. 1993)
          - (7) Jeremy Robert Hamilton Wills (b. 1955)
            - (8) Nicholas Patrick Hamilton Wills (b. 1986)
            - (9) Benjamin James Hamilton Wills (b. 1988)
      - Frederick Noel Hamilton Wills (1887—1927)
        - Major Michael Desmond Hamilton Wills (1915—1943)
          - (10) Frederick Hugh Philip Hamilton Wills (b. 1940)
            - (11) Michael James Hamilton Wills (b. 1972)
              - (12) Arthur William Mustard Hamilton Wills (b. 2002)
            - (13) Edward Hamilton Wills (b. 1974)
          - (14) Peter John Hamilton Wills (b. 1941)
            - (15) Richard Henry Wills (b. 1974)
    - Sir Frank William Wills, Lord Mayor of Bristol (1852—1932)
