= Sir Ernest Wills, 3rd Baronet =

Sir Ernest Salter Wills, 3rd Baronet of Hazelwood & Clapton in-Gordano, Laird of Meggernie Castle CStJ JP (30 November 1869 – 14 January 1958) was Lord Lieutenant of Wiltshire from 1930 to 1942. He played tennis at Wimbledon in the early 1900s.

== Life ==
The son of Sir Edward Payson Wills, 1st Baronet, and of Lady Wills (she was Mary Ann, elder daughter of J. Chaning Pearce, of Montagu House, Bath), Wills was born in 1869. He was educated at Monkton Combe School, just outside Bath in Somerset from 1884 to 1885. He succeeded his elder brother in the baronetcy in 1921.

The Wills family were part owners of W. D. & H. O. Wills, tobacco importers and cigarette manufacturers, which had been founded in Bristol by Wills's great-grandfather, Henry Overton Wills I, in 1786, and later became part of Imperial Tobacco. Wills was a cousin of Gilbert Wills, 1st Baron Dulverton, Sir George Alfred Wills, Baronet of Blagdon, and a nephew of Henry Overton Wills III, Sir Frederick Wills Bt & Sir Frank William Wills Kt.

In 1894, Wills married Caroline Fanny Maud, daughter of William Augustine de Winton, of Westbury Lodge, Durdham Down, Bristol, and they had two sons and three daughters.

- Doris Maud de Winton-Wills (9 August 1896 – 29 September 1968) married (14 June 1920) Norman Carl Haag, HM's Consul-General at Basel, Switzerland
- Margaret Joyce de Winton-Wills (21 June 1898 – 10 October 1976) married (10 June 1918) Thomas Trevor Kyffin, son of Dr John Kyffin
- Barbara Joan de Winton-Wills (23 February 1902) married (28 October 1925) second lieutenant (later Captain) Thomas Ansell Fairhurst, son of Lt.-Col James Ashton Fairhurst, Lord of the Manor of Arlington. They divorced in 1943 and she married, secondly, Jack Morton, son of George Arthur Morton, on 11 February 1943.
- Lt.-Col. Sir Ernest Edward de Winton-Wills, 4th Baronet of Hazelwood, Laird of Meggernie Castle, Scots Guards (8 December 1903 – August 1983) married firstly (26 January 1926) Sylvia Margaret Ogden at St Margaret's Westminster, and secondly (29 June 1949) Juliet Eve Graham-Clarke at Gloucester Cathedral
- Major George Seton Wills (18 May 1911 – 4 February 1979) married (30 October 1935) Lilah Mary Hare, daughter of Captain Percy Richard Hare

Wills owned substantial properties in England and Scotland: Clapton Court, Somerset; Ramsbury Manor and Littlecote House (the family seat) in Wiltshire, acquired in 1929; and Meggernie Castle in Perthshire. He also owned the Château de l'oiseau bleu at Menton on the French Riviera. He was a director of Imperial Tobacco and of the Portishead District Water Company.

Sir Ernest was succeeded in the title by his elder son; Lieutenant-Colonel Sir (Ernest) Edward de Winton Wills, 4th Baronet of Hazelwood, Laird of Meggernie Castle (1944), Scots Guards; the Officer Commanding the Royal Guard of HM King George VI, at Balmoral Castle. Sir Ernest's most notable grandchildren are:

- David Brudenell-Bruce, 9th Marquess of Ailesbury
- Anthony Weld-Forester, of Sotheby's
- Major Philip Bonn, a cousin of Queen Camilla (through her great grandparents; who are respectively his paternal great great uncle and great great aunt, being Lieutenant-Colonel the Hon George Keppel and Mrs George Keppel (Alice Keppel); and through his great great grandmother; Lady Theodora Keppel, of Hampton Court Palace (being the great great grandmother of the Queen) and also through the various mutually shared descents, through the Dukes of Newcastle; and via the House of Stuart.

Honorary titles
Preceded by The Earl of Radnor	Lord Lieutenant of Wiltshire; 1930–1942	Succeeded by The Duke of Somerset
Baronetage of the United Kingdom
Preceded by Edward Wills	Baronet (of Hazelwood and Clapton-in-Gordano); 1921–1958	Succeeded by Edward Wills
