= Frederick Noel Hamilton Wills =

British politician

Frederick Noel Hamilton Wills (1887–1927) of Miserden House, Gloucestershire was the founder of Rendcomb College.

== Early life and family ==
Frederick, or Noel as he was known, was born in 1887 and was the youngest son of Sir Frederick Wills of Northmoor, Dulverton and Anne (née Hamilton) who had five other children including Gilbert Wills. His father was a director of W.D. & H.O. Wills, a member of parliament and a staunch Liberal. His wife, Anne, was the daughter of Rev. James Hamilton, a noted Scottish cleric. The family home was located in Northmoor.

== Education ==
He was educated briefly at Winchester and then at Clifton College. At Magdalen College, Oxford, Noel Wills studied English, graduating in 1909. The same year, he started a monthly magazine of poetry with Walter Jerrold, which included contributions from Walter de la Mare, Quiller-Couch, Lady Margaret Sackville and Edward Thomas. Noel Wills' time at Oxford was marked by wide-ranging reading, a generous appreciation of the talents of those around him and, in the words of Professor G S Gordon (who became president of the college), an 'unostentatious goodness'.

== Adult life ==
In 1913, Wills purchased Miserden Park Estate from Arthur William Leathham.

He donated money to help build a new wing of Stroud Hospital.

=== First World War ===
Wills served with the Royal North Devon Yeomanry where he held a Commission. He then served with the Machine Gun Corps and left in 1917 due to his health.

== Foundation of Rendcomb College ==
The Wills family was no stranger when it came to educational altruism; the founder's uncle, Henry Overton Wills III and three of his cousins had founded and endowed buildings at Bristol University. In 1918, Noel Wills bought Rendcomb Park with a view to forming a 'Transition School' to provide a free boarding education to forty to fifty boys from the elementary schools of Gloucestershire and prepare them for entry to public schools. He envisaged that by giving them 'the best possible education, some would obtain scholarships to public schools and that some would ultimately go on to university. The initial vision involved supplements from the endowment to subsidise scholarships and leaving scholarships for those who could not secure entry to public schools for 'assistance in beginning professions and trades'. This vision evolved in the next two years in part by the Christmas gift that Mrs Wills had given her husband in 1917: An Adventure in Education by J H Simpson.

Simpson had been educated at Rugby School and Pembroke College, Cambridge, where he studied classics and history before teaching at Clifton College, Charterhouse School, Gresham's and Rugby. Noel Wills invited Simpson to Miserden in February 1919, and the conversation they had shaped the future of the vision. Instead of providing what was essentially a preparatory school education, Rendcomb College would educate boys for five years to sixteen, or seven were the boys of university material. That Noel Wills was prepared to compromise his original intentions says much for his receptiveness to new ideas and the respect that he had for the educationalist; that Simpson was prepared to leave Rugby to take the founding Headship of Rendcomb rather than posts at Oundle or Leeds University says much for the respect that the educationalist had for the founder. Simpson's attraction to Rendcomb would have been increased as he learnt more of the founder's intentions in a series of letters between the two in the months after their meeting outlining his intention to provide 'a social, moral and intellectual education rather than mere scholarship'. Simpson clearly saw the potential that such a brief provided.

On 2 June 1920, Rendcomb College opened with twelve boys, Simpson at the helm and Noel Wills as chair of governors. The two men shaped the path of the school for a little over seven years, and their relationship was founded on mutual respect and affection. In 1924, Wills wrote an illuminating piece for The English Review which gives a fascinating insight into those early years and his progressive educational vision.

Reflecting on his expectations of us – his satisfaction with our successes and his understanding of our shortcomings – we should proceed with humility and confidence in realizing his vision.- James Herbert Simpson, founding Headmaster of Rendcomb College.

== Personal life ==
Wills developed strong creative interests including painting, music (cellist and tenor), design, wood carving, writing and later in life, gem cutting. He also hunted, played polo, and fished.

Noel was a very wealthy man and had inherited a third of his late father's estate in 1909.

In 1912, Noel Wills married Margery Hamilton Fraser, the eldest daughter of Sir Hugh Fraser of Stromeferry House, Ross-shire who was High Court of Justice judge.

A Scottish obituary (1927), records that Wills was the owner of the Invergarry Estate and Mansion. A slightly later report records that the estate was to be auctioned; it "only" extended to 160 acres but included the "whole of the angling in the Garry below the falls and in Loch Oich". This report refers to the House rather than a mansion; it could be referencing the current-day Invergarry Hotel.

=== Children ===
Noel Wills had a son, MDH Wills who was a captain in the Coldstream Guards at the time he was reported missing in Africa in July 1943 and was later confirmed dead. He is remembered on the MEDJEZ-EL-BAB MEMORIAL in Tunisia.

== Death ==
Noel Wills died in Cheltenham in October 1927, aged 40, following an operation. His estate was valued at £5.053 million gross and £4.894 million net
