= Wills baronets of Blagdon (1923) =

Arms of Wills baronets "of Blagdon" (1923): Gules, a sun in splendour between two griffins passant or

The Wills baronetcy, of Blagdon in the County of Somerset, was created in the Baronetage of the United Kingdom on 19 July 1923 for George Alfred Wills (first cousin once removed of the 1st baronet of the first creation of 1893). He was president of the Imperial Tobacco Company.

The 2nd Baronet was a director of the Imperial Tobacco Company. The 4th Baronet served as Lord-Lieutenant of Avon and of Somerset, and as Pro-Chancellor of the University of Bath.

== Wills baronets, of Blagdon (1923) ==
- Sir George Alfred Wills, 1st Baronet (1854–1928)
- Sir George Vernon Proctor Wills, 2nd Baronet (1887–1931)
- Sir George Peter Vernon Wills, 3rd Baronet (1922–1945) was killed in action.
- Sir John Vernon Wills, 4th Baronet (1928–1998)
- Sir David James Vernon Wills, 5th Baronet (born 1955)

The heir presumptive is the present holder's brother Anthony John Vernon Wills (born 1956).
