= Henry Overton Wills (disambiguation) =

Henry Overton Wills III was first Chancellor of the University of Bristol, and a member of the Wills tobacco family.

Henry Overton Wills may also refer to:

- Henry Overton Wills I (1761–1826), British tobacco merchant, and a member of the Wills tobacco family
- Henry Overton Wills II (1800–1871), British tobacco merchant, and a member of the Wills tobacco family
