= Northmoor, Dulverton =

Historic estate in Somerset, England

Coordinates: 51.0477°N 3.5655°W

Northmoor is an historic estate in the parish of Dulverton in Somerset, England. The Victorian mansion house known as Northmoor House is set amongst steep wooded valleys on the southern edge of Exmoor.

== History ==
=== Locke ===
Northmoor House was built in 1856/9 by John Arthur Locke, a partner in the lead manufacturing firm of Locke and Blackett of Newcastle upon Tyne. The site was reputedly chosen by his wife. He purchased surrounding lands eventually forming an estate of 2,000 acres. John Arthur Locke (d.1888) of Northmoor married Adèle Caroline Drewe (d.1895), who in 1891 inherited from her brother Major-General Francis Edward Drewe (1830-1891) the historic estate of The Grange, Broadhembury in Devon, the seat of the Drewe family since the 16th century. His eldest son and heir was Arthur Charles Edward Locke, of Northmoor, who sold Grange which thus in 1903 passed from the ownership of the Drewe family and its descendants. John Locke built nearby the "Northmoor Chapel" (burned down in 1900) to service the spiritual needs of the estate, and employed Rev. George Jellicoe as chaplain and tutor to his eight children.

=== Wills ===
In 1874 Northmoor was purchased by Frederick Wills, a member of the Wills family of Bristol, founders of the Imperial Tobacco Company, which in 1966 was the family with the largest number of millionaires in the British Isles, with 14 members having left fortunes in excess of one million pounds since 1910, totalling £55 million. In 1897 Frederick Wills of Manor Heath in Bournemouth, and of Northmoor House was created a baronet "of Northmoor in the County of Somerset". He was a director of W. D. & H. O. Wills, which later merged into the Imperial Tobacco Company, and was a Liberal Unionist Member of Parliament for Bristol North. He was the elder brother of Sir Frank William Wills Kt, & the younger brother of Sir Edward Payson Wills, 1st Baronet of Hazelwood, and the cousin of William Henry Wills, 1st Baron Winterstoke. In 1929 his son Sir Gilbert Wills, 2nd Baronet was raised to the peerage as Baron Dulverton "of Batsford in the County of Gloucester". In 1874 a new stable block with clock tower was built at the rear of the house, but were demolished in the 1950s. Also built by the Wills family were staff accommodation and the Gardeners Cottage and buildings at Kennel Farm. The Wills family of Northmoor were associated with the Dulverton Foxhounds, since split into two hunts, the Dulverton Foxhounds (East) (since renamed the Dulverton Farmers Foxhounds) and the Dulverton (West) Foxhounds. The sinister supporter of the coat of arms adopted by Baron Dulverton is a "huntsman of the Dulverton Hunt".

=== Marriott-Dodington ===
Roger Marriott-Dodington (1866-1925) of Orchard Portman House and Horsington House, Somerset, High Sheriff of Somerset in 1922. Roger Marriott-Dodington was the owner of the historic estate of Combe near Dulverton, being the eldest son and heir of Thomas I Marriott-Dodington (d.1890) who had purchased the estate in 1872. The Marriott-Dodington family succeeded the Wills family at Northmoor House, and in 1926 were themselves succeeded by the Clayton family. Thomas II Marriott-Dodington (1895-1916), the eldest son of Roger Marriott-Dodington (d.1925), was killed in action in World War I and his younger brother James Marriott-Dodington in 1937 was resident at "Northmoor Estate", Kyambu, Kenya.

=== Clayton ===
In 1926 Northmoor was purchased by Colonel Edward Clayton whose son lived there until 1994 when he sold the main house and 100 acres and moved to nearby Kennel Barn, where he established a business making all-terrain Supercat vehicles.

=== Nicholson ===
Northmoor House and the estate's remaining 100 acres were bought in 1994, refurbished and operated as a 25-room holiday let.
