= David Tyler =

David Tyler may refer to:

- David Tyler (producer) (born 1961), British television and radio comedy producer
- David Tyler (businessman) (born 1953), British business executive
- David Gardiner Tyler (1846–1927), U.S. Democratic Party politician
