= Church of St Andrew, Blagdon =

Church in Somerset, England

Church of St Andrew
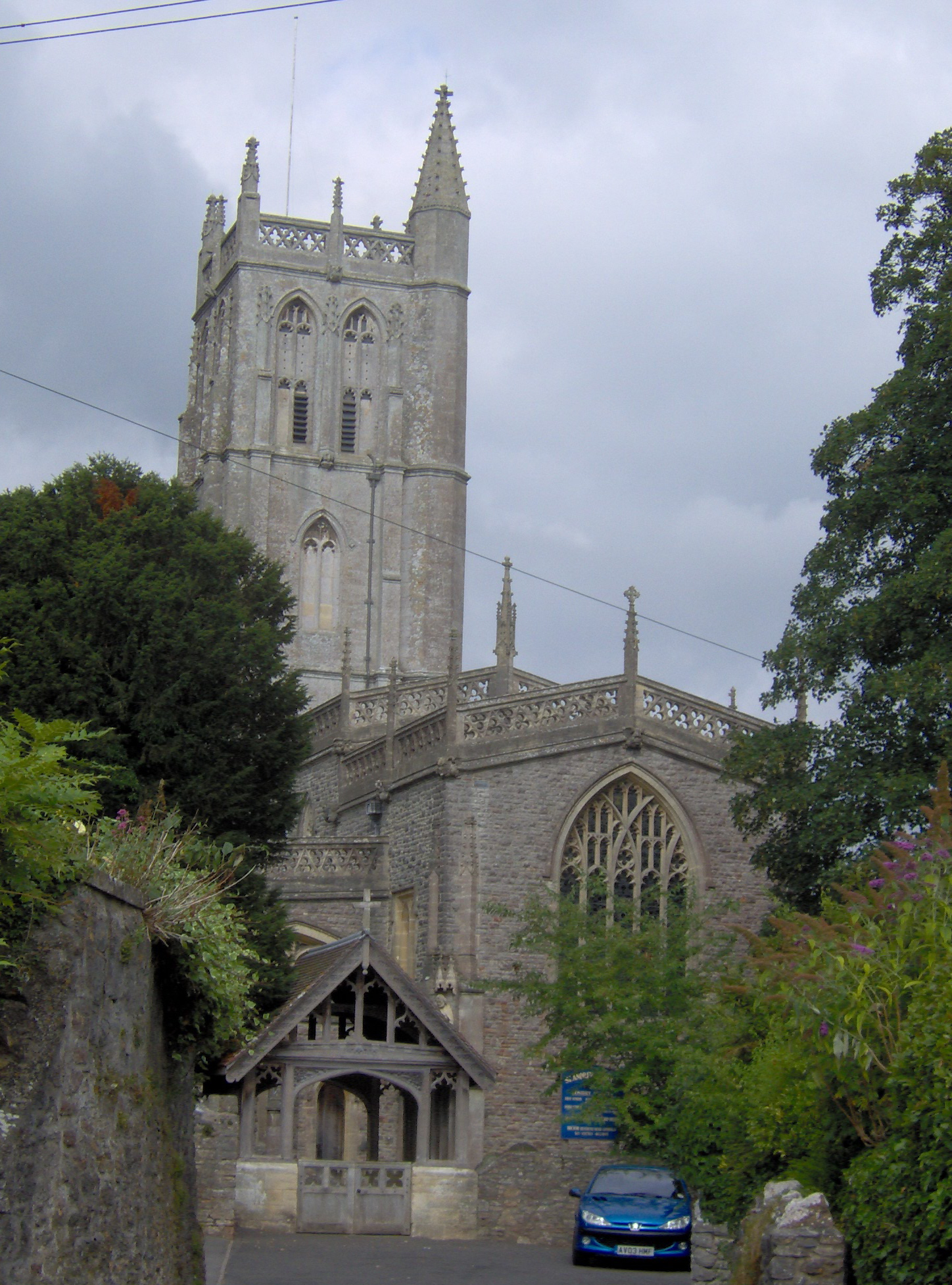

- Location within Somerset
- 51°19′40″N 2°42′47″W
- Location: Blagdon, Somerset, England

History
- Built: 15th century

Listed Building – Grade II*
- Designated: 9 February 1961
- Reference no.: 1146388

The Anglican Church Of St Andrew in Blagdon, within the English county of Somerset, was built in the 15th century. It is a Grade II* listed building.

The church has a 116 feet (35 m) high tower with pinnacles and a cusped lozenge pattern parapet, with a stair turret spirelet in the north-east corner. The tower dates from the 15th century and is one of the tallest in Somerset. The tower contains a bell dating from 1716 and made by Edward Bilbie of the Bilbie family. The remainder of the church was rebuilt in 1907–09 by Lord Winterstoke (of the Wills tobacco family)

The interior includes a romanesque piscina set into the south wall of the chancel.

The lychgate to the east of the church is a Grade II listed building in its own right. Above the door are four primitive Norman carvings which survived three rebuildings.

Augustus Toplady was serving as curate of St Andrew's in the 1760s when he wrote the hymn Rock of Ages. It is believed that he was inspired to write the lyrics while sheltering under a rock in nearby Burrington Combe.

In 2013 fundraising was undertaken to provide toilets and a new kitchen in the church. Improvements were also made to the damp proofing and insulation.

The parish is part of the benefice of Blagdon with Charterhouse, Compton Martin and Ubley within the Diocese of Bath and Wells.

== See also ==
- List of ecclesiastical parishes in the Diocese of Bath and Wells
