= Baron Dulverton =

Title in the Peerage of the United Kingdom

Baron Dulverton, of Batsford in the County of Gloucester, is a title in the Peerage of the United Kingdom. It was created in 1929 for the businessman Sir Gilbert Wills, 2nd Baronet. He was President of the Imperial Tobacco Company and also sat as a Conservative Member of Parliament for Taunton and Weston-super-Mare. The Wills Baronetcy, of Manor Heath in the Parish of Bournemouth in the County of Southampton, was created on 12 August 1897 for his father Frederick Wills. He was a director of W. D. & H. O. Wills, which later merged into the Imperial Tobacco Company, and also represented Bristol North in Parliament as a Liberal Unionist. A member of the wealthy Bristol tobacco importing Wills family, he was the younger brother of Sir Edward Payson Wills, 1st Baronet, a half brother of Sir Frank William Wills Kt., and the cousin of William Wills, 1st Baron Winterstoke. In 1966 the Wills family contained the largest number of millionaires in the British Isles, with 14 members leaving fortunes in excess of one million pounds since 1910, totalling £55 million.

As of 2026 the titles are held by the 1st Baron's grandson, the 3rd Baron, who succeeded his father in 1992.

The family seat is Batsford Park, near Batsford, Gloucestershire.

== Wills baronets, of Manor Heath (1897) ==
Arms of Wills baronets "of Northmoor" (1897) (Barons Dulverton (1929)): Gules, three estoiles flammant fesswise between two griffins passant wings expanded and inverted or

- Sir Frederick Wills, 1st Baronet (1838–1909)
- Sir Gilbert Alan Hamilton Wills, 2nd Baronet (1880–1956) (created Baron Dulverton in 1929)

== Barons Dulverton (1929) ==
- Gilbert Alan Hamilton Wills, 1st Baron Dulverton (1880–1956)
- (Frederick) Anthony Hamilton Wills, 2nd Baron Dulverton (1915–1992)
- (Gilbert) Michael Hamilton Wills, 3rd Baron Dulverton (b. 1944)

The heir apparent is the present holder's son Hon. Robert Anthony Hamilton Wills (b. 1983).

== See also ==
- Baron Winterstoke
- Wills baronets, of Hazlewood

Baronetage of the United Kingdom
Preceded by Baird baronets	Wills baronets of Manor Heath; 12 August 1897	Succeeded by Wilson baronets
