= Frank William Wills =

British businessman and Mayor of Bristol

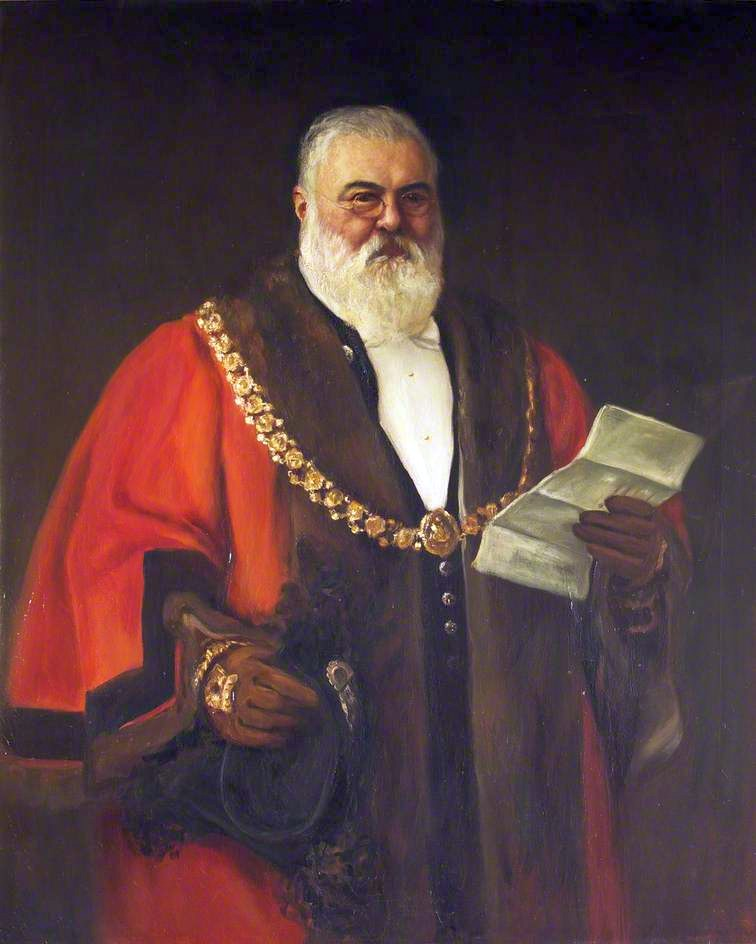
Frank William Wills in his robes as Mayor of Bristol, 1911

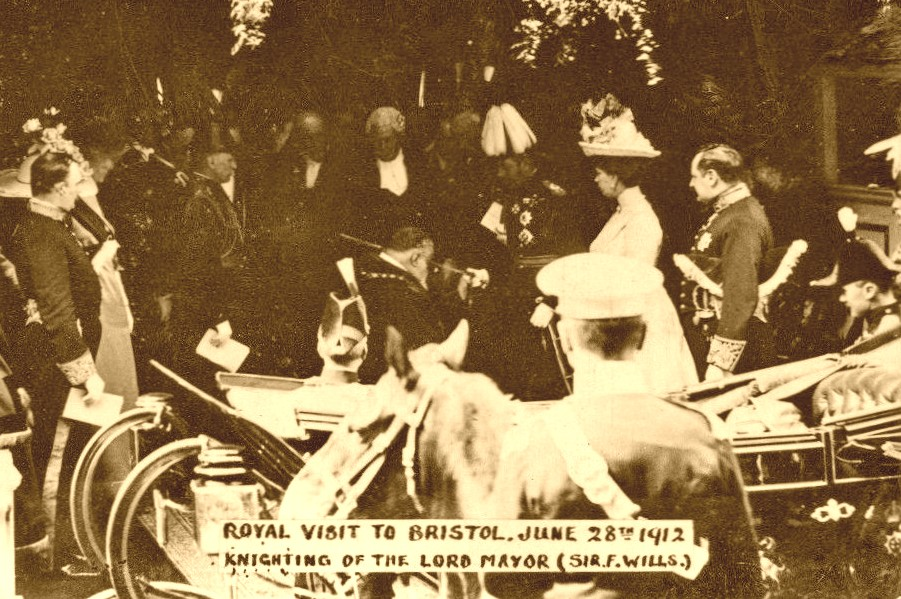
Wills being knighted by George V at the Bristol Royal Infirmary, 1912

Sir Frank William Wills (17 August 1852 – 26 March 1932) of Berkeley Square, Bristol, England, was a member of the Wills tobacco family, who became a noted British architect and went on to serve as Lord Mayor of Bristol.

== Early life and career ==
Frank Wills was born on 17 August 1852 in Bristol into a large family, as the fifth of seven children born to Henry Overton Wills II and his second wife Mary Seccombe (1815–1897). There were also eleven children from Henry's first marriage to Isabella Board (1806–1843). Frank's father was one of the owners of the W.D. & H.O. Wills tobacco company, which became the largest tobacco importer and manufacturer of tobacco products in late 19th-century Britain.

Frank had several brothers who followed their father into the family tobacco business, but he was drawn instead to a technical career. He initially attended Mill Hill School in London and Amersham Hall in Buckinghamshire, before entering the Merchant Venturer's Technical College in Bristol, where he trained as an architect and surveyor. He ultimately became one of the most respected architects in Bristol, and designed several notable buildings, including the main W.D. & H.O. Wills company factory on East Street in Bedminster, the facade of which is partially preserved in the modern building. He also worked on the Bedminster Library, several churches, part of the Bristol City Museum and Art Gallery, and the Bristol Grammar School.

== Later years and death ==
His interests turned in later years to politics and public service, which led him to serve in 1891 as president of the Anchor Society, a charitable organisation in Bristol that looked after the old and infirm. He went on to city politics, becoming in 1908 a city councillor, then in 1910–11 the Lord Mayor of Bristol. He was knighted on 28 June 1912 by King George V during a royal visit to the opening of the Edward VII Memorial Wing of the Bristol Royal Infirmary in Bristol. He was also a Justice of the Peace, and died a much respected citizen on 26 March 1932 in Bristol, where he is buried in the Arnos Vale Cemetery. A portrait of him by an unknown artist hangs in the Mansion House of Bristol City Council.

== Family connections ==
His grandfather was Henry Overton Wills I, who went from co-owning a small tobacco shop in 1786 on Castle Street in Bristol, to owning a succession of tobacco companies. H.O. Wills died in 1826 and was succeeded by his sons William Day Wills (Frank Wills's uncle) and Henry Overton Wills II (Franks's father). They went on in 1830 to found W.D. & H.O. Wills, which grew to become the largest tobacco company in Britain. They were followed by Frank's cousin Sir William Henry Wills (Lord Winterstoke), who became the first chairman in 1901 of the newly created Imperial Tobacco Company, which made him essentially the head of the British tobacco industry.

Frank Wills also had two half-brothers of note, Sir Edward Payson Wills and Sir Frederick Wills, who both became baronets, and like Frank served as presidents of the Anchor Society; Sir Frederick also served as a member of parliament. Another half-brother was Henry Overton Wills III, who became first Chancellor of the University of Bristol. He was also uncle of Gilbert Wills, 1st Baron Dulverton, Sir Ernest Wills, 3rd Baronet of Hazelwood, and Sir George Alfred Wills, Baronet of Blagdon.

In 1874 Frank married Sarah Rebecca Dobell, a daughter of Henry William Dobell of Sherard House, Eltham (who was Comptroller General) and Mary Charlotte Seth-Smith, whose father Seth Smith built large portions of Mayfair and Belgravia in the early 19th century.
