= Henry Overton Wills II =

British tobacco merchant

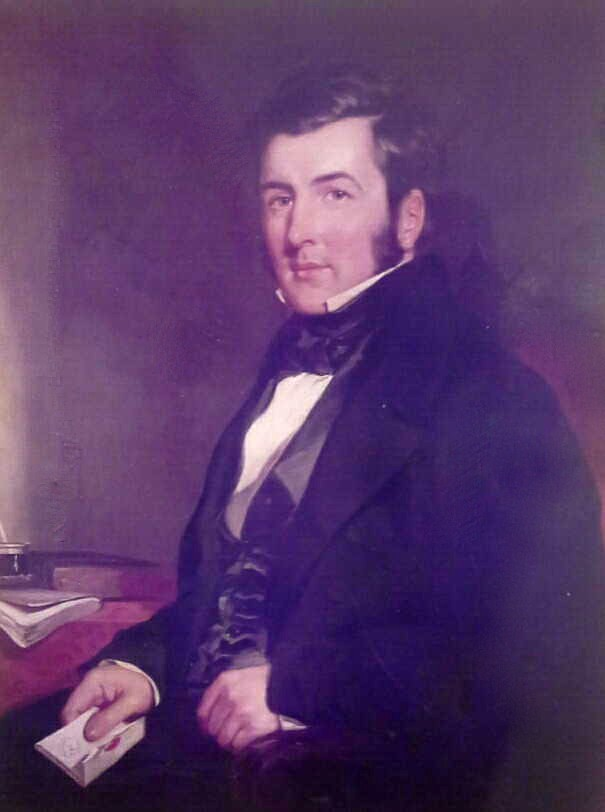
- Henry Overton Wills II
- Born: 3 July 1800
- Died: 23 November 1871 (aged 71)

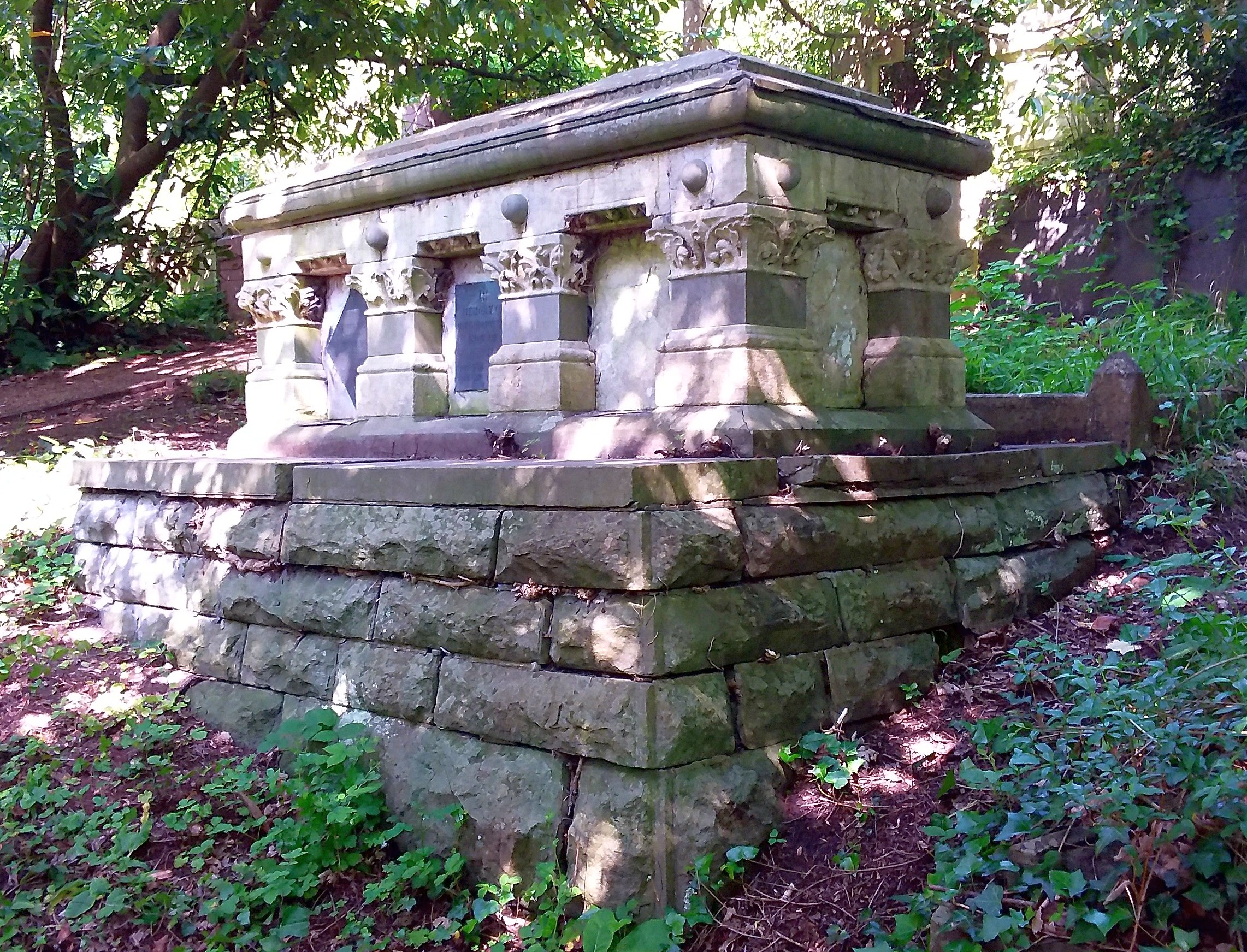
the tomb of Henry Overton Wills II at Arnos Vale Cemetery

Henry Overton Wills II (3 July 1800 – 23 November 1871) of Ashley House, in Bristol, England, was a tobacco merchant who in 1830 together with his elder brother William Day Wills co-founded W.D. & H.O. Wills, a company which (building on the successful tobacco business established by their father) by the late 1800s had become Britain's largest importer of tobacco and manufacturer of tobacco products.

== Origins ==
Henry Overton Wills II was born on 3 July 1800 in Bristol, the younger of the two sons of Henry Overton Wills I (1761–1826) by his wife Ann Day. In 1786 his Salisbury-born father, with his partner Samuel Watkins, had opened a tobacco shop in Bristol, which grew into a successful business.

== Career ==
Henry and his elder brother William Day Wills in 1815 joined their father's firm, and became co-owners of the company in 1826 when he died. In 1830 the brothers founded W.D. & H.O. Wills, which grew to become the leading importer of tobacco, and manufacturer of tobacco products in late 19th-century Britain. In 1859 Henry made his son Edward Payson Wills a partner in the firm, who succeeded to his father's interests in the company.

H.O. Wills II entered local politics in 1845 as a City Councillor for the St. Pauls district of Bristol and he continued to serve on the town council for several years until hearing problems forced him to retire from public duties. He also served in 1856 as Justice of the Peace. He was also an active a supporter of the Congregationalist faith, and he and his brother William were founder trustees in 1841 of the Hanham Chapel and in 1843 of the Barton Hill Chapel, both located in the Bristol suburbs.

== Marriages and children ==
H.O. Wills II married twice:

- Firstly to Isabella Board (1806–1843), by whom he had eleven children including:
  - Henry Overton Wills III (1828–1911), eldest son, of Kelston Knoll, near Bath in Somerset, who funded the creation of the University of Bristol and became its first Chancellor;
  - Sir Edward Payson Wills, 1st Baronet (1834–1910), second son, in 1904 created a baronet "of Hazelwood Stoke Bishop, in Westbury-on-Trym in the County of Gloucester and Clapton-in-Gordano in the County of Somerset". He donated the Jubilee Convalescent Home to Bristol.
  - Sir Frederick Wills, 1st Baronet (1838–1909), 4th son, in 1897 created a baronet "of Northmoor and Manor Heath".
- Secondly he married Mary Seccombe (c.1815–1897), by whom he had another seven children, not all of whom survived to adulthood. His surviving sons by Mary Seccombe included:
  - Sir Frank William Wills (1852–1932), Knight Bachelor, a noted British architect and Lord Mayor of Bristol.

== Death and burial ==
He died on 23 November 1871 in Bristol, and is buried in Arnos Vale Cemetery.
