= Sir David James Vernon Wills, 5th Baronet =

Sir David James Vernon Wills, 5th Baronet (born 1955) is the 5th Baronet of Blagdon, a title created in 1923 for the president of the Imperial Tobacco Company.

Wills is the son of Sir John Vernon Wills, 4th Bt. and Diana Baker. He married Paula Holmes in July 1999. Wills succeeded as the 5th Baronet Wills, of Blagdon, co. Somerset [U.K., 1923] on his father's death on 26 August 1998.

Wills owns the 2,000 acre Coombe Lodge Estate in Blagdon, near Bristol, and in 2013 launched a handmade furniture business using wood felled from the estate. The heritage listed Coombe Lodge, described as "the last of the great English country houses", was built for the Wills family in 1930–32 and has been used since as a college of further education and a wedding venue.

Since 1991, Wills has been a member of The Society of Merchant Venturers. Also in 2003 he was the president of the Anchor Society.

Baronetage of the United Kingdom
Preceded by John Vernon Wills	Baronet (of Blagdon); 1998–present	Incumbent
