= Anchor Society =

Bristol charity

Logo of the Anchor Society of Bristol, England

The Anchor Society CIO is a Charitable Incorporated Organisation based in Bristol, England which supports older people in need in the Bristol and Bath region (BS, BA and GL Postcodes). Its work primarily centres around grants to individuals, housing and other projects which benefit older people.

The original unincorporated Anchor Society was formed by the Whigs in 1769, when it held a dinner at the Three Tuns, a tavern on the site of the present Corn Exchange in the centre of the medieval quarter of Bristol, when 22 members were present. Some 46 years after his death, the initial founders wished to emulate Edward Colston's philanthropy, so at this inaugural dinner the President, Gilbert Davies took up a collection for their charitable work. Initially, the Anchor Society supported 'lying-in' women and poor orphaned females to save them from prostitution. Today, the charity focuses its attention on helping older people in need.

The Anchor Society is closely aligned with the Dolphin Society and the Grateful Society, both of which also help older people in the greater Bristol area. All three societies also gather in mid-November to celebrate their charitable work at an annual service of thanksgiving.

Since its inception, there has been an unbroken record of Presidents' annual appointments and personal collections in support of the charity's work.

== Past Presidents and annual collections ==
- 1769 Gilbert Davies - £12
- 1770 Gilbert Davies - £35
- 1771 John Fowle - £46
- 1772 John Rowland - £80
- 1773 Dr. Andrew Paterson - £86
- 1774 Dr. John Wright - £121
- 1787 James Harvey - £290
- 1789 Robert Claxton - £350
- 1791 John Harris - £361
- 1800 Samuel Span - £284
- 1814 Brooke Smith - £360
- 1820 Micheal Hinton Castle - £374
- 1840 Frederick Ricketts - £536
- 1841 Richard Ash - £441
- 1843 F.H.F. Berkeley, M.P. - £619
- 1859 Elisha Smith Robinson - £510
- 1866 William Henry Wills, 1st Baron Winterstoke - £634
- 1867 George Wills - £576
- 1868 Lewis Fry - £1,022
- 1878 Samuel Day Wills - £915
- 1880 Sir Edward Payson Wills Bt. K.C.B. - £941
- 1881 Francis J.Fry - £1,003
- 1882 Sir Frederick Wills Bt - £1,011
- 1883 Charles Townsend - £946
- 1887 Edward Robinson - £1,035
- 1891 Sir Frank William Wills Kt. - £1,054
- 1892 Sir William Howell Davis - £1,070
- 1895 Walter Melville Wills - £1,020
- 1898 Sir Herbert Ashman Bt. - £1,315
- 1921 Percy Steadman - £1,851
- 1922 Alderman George Bryant Britton, M.P. - £1,426
- 1930 W.H.Eyles - £1,212
- 1931 H.C.Lenard - £1,389
- 1936 Dr. J. Odery Symes - £1,726
- 1935 Harold G.Robinson - £2,017
- 1939 T.Thornton Wills - £1,463
- 1940 Sir Seymour Williams - £1,158
- 1941 Colonel E.W.Lennard - £1,643
- 1945 F.M.Arkle - £2,263
- 1946 J.H.Britton, C.B.E - £2,231
- 1947 Brig. A.W.L.Newth, C.B.E, D.S.O, M.C. - £2,306
- 1954 J.B.Steadman - £4,102
- 1961 J.A.Seymour-Williams - £3,429
- 1966 Andrew Breach C.B.E. - £4,781
- 1968 H.P. Lucas - £6,108
- 1967 Sir John Partridge, K.B.E. - £5,775
- 1969 Henry Hugh Arthur Fitzroy Somerset, 10th Duke of Beaufort - £10,056
- 1976 D.A.Newton - £10,695
- 1977 Patrick Seager Hill, T.D. - £9,490
- 1978 Micheal Collings - £12,362
- 1979 Paul Watling - £9,552
- 1980 J.G.S.Young - £15,645
- 1981 R.A.Garret C.B.E. - £12,807
- 1983 Norman Ricketts, O.B.E - £21,060
- 1985 J.R.Pool M.B.E. - £28,174
- 1986 His Honour Judge J.A.Cox - £23,339
- 1990 F.A. Avery - £50,269
- 1994 Robert Durie O.B.E. - £71,686
- 1999 John Burke O.B.E - £95,656
- 2003 Sir David James Vernon Wills, 5th Baronet - £74,225
- 2015 Canon Dr. John Savage C.B.E. - £83,067
- 2016 Bob Reeves LL.D - £100,897
- 2017 Dr John Manley - £103,186
- 2018 Professor Steve West CBE DL - £108,774
- 2019 Dr Ros Kennedy - £104,763
- 2020 Francis Montagu - £109,312
