= Blagdon railway station =

Disused railway station in Blagdon, North Somerset

Blagdon
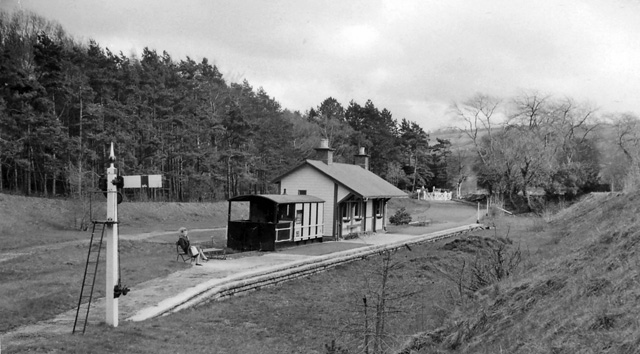
- The site of the station in 1963

General information
- Location: Blagdon, North Somerset; England
- Coordinates: 51.3333°N 2.7133°W

Other information
- Status: Disused

History
- Original company: Wrington Vale Light Railway
- Pre-grouping: Great Western Railway

Key dates
- 4 December 1901: Station opened
- 14 September 1931: Station closed to passengers
- 1 November 1950: Station closed to goods
Location

Blagdon railway station is a closed terminus railway station situated in the village of Blagdon in North Somerset, England.

The station opened on the 4 December 1901 when the Wrington Vale Light Railway opened the line from Congresbury.

The station closed to passengers on 14 September 1931.

Despite the station being closed for passengers it was host to a GWR camp coach from 1935 to 1939. Camp coach occupants were transported to the station on the daily goods train from Yatton.

The station closed to goods on 1 November 1950. The site is now a private house.

== Bibliography ==
- Fenton, Mike (1999), Camp Coach Holidays on the G.W.R, Wild Swan, ISBN 1-874103-53-4
- Hurst, Geoffrey (1992). Register of Closed Railways: 1948-1991. Worksop, Nottinghamshire: Milepost Publications. ISBN 0-9477-9618-5.
- McRae, Andrew (1997). British Railway Camping Coach Holidays: The 1930s & British Railways (London Midland Region). Vol. Scenes from the Past: 30 (Part One). Foxline. ISBN 1-870119-48-7.
- Quick, Michael (2022) [2001]. Railway passenger stations in Great Britain: a chronology (PDF). version 5.04. Railway & Canal Historical Society. Archived from the original (PDF) on 25 November 2022.
