= William Day Wills =

British tobacco merchant

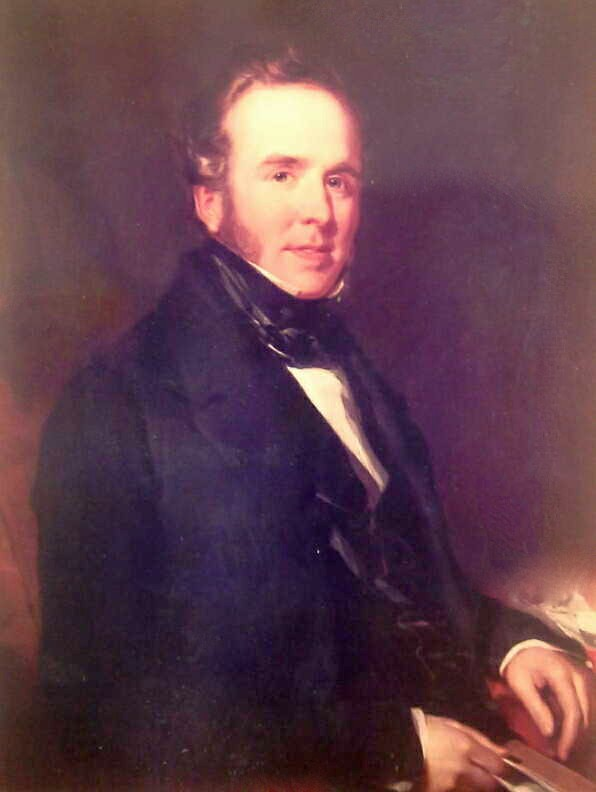
- Born: 6 June 1797; Bristol, England
- Died: 13 May 1865 (aged 67); St Bartholomew's Hospital, London, England
- Resting place: Arnos Vale Cemetery
- Occupation: Tobacco merchant
- Known for: Co-founder of W.D. & H.O. Wills
- Children: William Wills, 1st Baron Winterstoke
- Father: Henry Overton Wills I
- Relatives: Henry Overton Wills II (brother)

William Day Wills (6 June 1797 – 13 May 1865) of 2 Portland Square, Bristol, England, was a tobacco merchant who in 1830 together with his younger brother Henry Overton Wills II took over W.D. & H.O. Wills, a company which (building on the successful tobacco business established by their father) by the late 19th-century had become Britain's largest importer of tobacco and manufacturer of tobacco products.

== Origins ==
William Day Wills was born on 6 June 1797 in Bristol the elder of the two sons of Henry Overton Wills I (1761-1826) by his wife Ann Day. In 1786 his Salisbury-born father, with his partner Samuel Watkins, had opened a tobacco shop in Bristol, which grew into a successful business.

== Career ==
=== Business ===
In 1815 William and his younger brother Henry Overton Wills II (1800-1871) joined their father's firm and in 1826 following their father's death became co-owners of the company. In 1830 the brothers founded W.D. & H.O. Wills, which grew to become the leading importer of tobacco, and manufacturer of tobacco products in late 19th-century Britain. William retired in 1851 from full-time management of the firm and his responsibilities were taken over by his son William Wills, 1st Baron Winterstoke.

=== Politics and religion ===
He made an unsuccessful foray into local politics in 1838 when he ran as the Liberal Party candidate for councillor of the Redcliffe ward in Bristol. However, he was successful on his second attempt in 1846, when he was elected councillor for the St Paul's ward of the city, a position previously held by his brother Henry. He continued until 1861 to represent the St Paul's ward of the city, and served as a Charity Trustee from 1852 until his death. He was a Justice of the Peace at the time of his death. In religion he was an active Congregationalist, and he and his brother Henry were founder trustees in 1841 of the Hanham Chapel and in 1843 of the Barton Hill Chapel, both located in Bristol's suburbs.

== Marriage and children ==
On May 2, 1820 in London he married Mary Steven, third daughter of Robert Steven of Glasgow, Scotland and of Camberwell in Surrey, by whom he had three children, of whom only one survived:

- William Wills, 1st Baron Winterstoke (1830-1911), 2nd son and only surviving child, who in 1893 was created a baronet "of Coombe Lodge in the Parish of Blagdon in the County of Somerset" (following which he was known as "Sir William Wills, 1st Baronet") and in 1906 was raised to the peerage as Baron Winterstoke "of Blagdon in the County of Somerset". In 1901 he became chairman of the Imperial Tobacco Company, into which the Wills business had merged, which effectively made him the head of the British tobacco industry.

== Death and burial ==
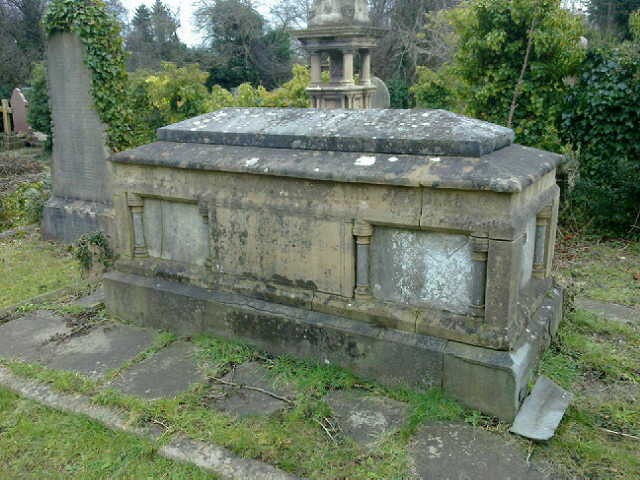
Tomb of William Day Wills at Arnos Vale Cemetery in Bristol

Like his brother he grew partially deaf in later years and was fatally injured on 11 May 1865 in London having inadvertently stepped in front of a horse-drawn carriage. His left leg was severely crushed and he was rushed to St Bartholomew's Hospital, where his leg was amputated, but the strain was too much and he died on 13 May 1865 two days later. The following week his body was buried in Arnos Vale Cemetery in Bristol, where several hundred mourners attended his funeral.
