= Margaret Fingerhut =

British classical pianist (born 1955)

Margaret Fingerhut MBE
- Born: 30 March 1955 (age 71)
- Education: Royal College of Music
- Occupation: Classical pianist
- Spouse: David Tyler (businessman)

Margaret Ruth Fingerhut MBE (born 30 March 1955) is a British classical pianist. She is known for her innovative recital programmes and recordings in which she explores lesser known piano repertoire.

The composer and reviewer Paul Corfield Godfrey wrote that "Margaret Fingerhut deserves our heartfelt admiration for her championship of the byways of the British twentieth-century piano repertory".

== Education and personal life ==
Fingerhut attended North London Collegiate School. She studied at the Royal College of Music with Cyril Smith and Angus Morrison, and afterwards with Vlado Perlemuter in Paris and Leon Fleisher and Adele Marcus in the USA. She cites meeting and playing with Leonard Sorkin, the leader of the original Fine Arts Quartet, as an inspiration. Fingerhut is married to David Tyler. She has a son from a previous marriage.

== Career and recordings ==
Fingerhut was selected as a Young Musician of the Year by the Greater London Arts Association in 1981. She made her London debut at the Wigmore Hall in the same year, and first played in the Royal Festival Hall in 1983, playing the Grieg Piano Concerto. Fingerhut has performed concertos with world-renowned orchestras including the London Symphony Orchestra, London Philharmonic Orchestra, Philharmonia Orchestra, Royal Philharmonic Orchestra, BBC Philharmonic, BBC National Orchestra of Wales, BBC Scottish Symphony Orchestra and the London Mozart Players, in venues such as the Royal Festival Hall, Royal Albert Hall and the Barbican. She has collaborated with conductors such as Leonard Slatkin, John Williams, Paul Daniel, Rudolf Barshai, Sir Charles Groves, Sir Edward Downes, Vernon Handley and Bryden Thomson. She appeared as Maria Yudina in Testimony, Tony Palmer's film about Shostakovich.

Her discs on the Chandos label include works by Bainton, Bax, Berkeley, Bloch, Dukas, Falla, Grieg, Howells, Leighton, Moeran, Novák, Stanford, Suk and Tansman, as well as several pioneering collections of 19th century Russian and early 20th century French piano music. She was also the soloist in the world première recording of Percy Young's arrangement of Elgar's sketches for his Piano Concerto slow movement, with the Munich Symphony Orchestra conducted by Douglas Bostock. Other première recordings include Bainton's Concerto Fantasia, Bax's Octet and solo piano works by Howells, Leighton, Lennox Berkeley and Michael Berkeley. Fingerhut also made the first recording in 1992 of Canon in E minor, a student piano piece by Rachmaninoff.

Two of her Bax recordings – the Octet with the Academy of St Martin in the Fields Chamber Ensemble and the Concertante for Piano Left Hand and Orchestra with Vernon Handley and the BBC Philharmonic – were short-listed for Gramophone awards. Her disc of solo piano music by Alexandre Tansman was awarded a "Diapason D’Or" in Diapason magazine. Her CD of encores, "Endless Song", was Featured Album of the Week on Classic FM and was selected as "Editor's Choice" in Pianist' as well as being awarded an "Outstanding" accolade in International Record Review.

Fingerhut is interested in working with contemporary composers and has given first performances of works by Tony Bridgewater, James Francis Brown, Peter Copley, Clive Jenkins, Farhad Poupel, Roxanna Panufnik and Paul Spicer in venues such as the Wigmore Hall, Purcell Room and at the Three Choirs Festival and Ryedale Festival.

== Teaching ==
Fingerhut is a Visiting Lecturer at the Royal Birmingham Conservatoire where she was made an Honorary Fellow in 2015. She formerly taught piano at the Royal Northern College of Music and at Trinity Laban Conservatoire. She is a regular guest at summer schools such as Dartington International Summer School, Chetham's International Summer School for Pianists and Jackdaws. Her teaching at Dartington was described by The Spectator magazine as demonstrating "enormous skill and sympathy". She has given masterclasses in the US, Canada, Japan and China, and has been on the jury of competitions such as the BBC Young Musician of the Year.

She has written for the magazines Classical Music, International Piano and Pianist.

== Charitable work ==
In 2019 Fingerhut devised and performed a recital tour around the UK which raised £88,000 for refugees in the UK – this represents £1,000 for each of the keys of a grand piano. Her programme drew together the music and stories of famous composers who migrated, giving her audiences a cultural perspective on the theme of migration and exile. Her achievement was recognised with a 'Champion of Sanctuary' award by the City of Sanctuary UK in 2019.

In 2022 Margaret collaborated with Viktoriia Levchenko, a young Ukrainian filmmaker, to make a video in support of Ukraine. Set to her performance of Les Rochers d’Outche-Coche by the Ukrainian composer Sergei Bortkiewicz, the video raised money for emergency vehicles in Ukraine.

Fingerhut is also a patron of British Friends of the Oasis of Peace.

She was appointed Member of the Order of the British Empire (MBE) in the 2024 New Year Honours for services to music and charitable fundraising.

== Discography ==
- Arnold Works for violin & piano SOMMCD 0640 (with Peter Fisher, violin)
- Bainton Concerto fantasia CHAN 10460 (BBC Philharmonic, Paul Daniel)
- Bax Concertante for piano left hand, and orchestra CHAN 9715 (BBC Philharmonic Orchestra, Vernon Handley)
- Bax Octet for piano, horn & string sextet CHAN 9602 (Academy of St. Martin-in-the-Fields Chamber Ensemble)
- Bax Symphonic Variations CHAN 8516 (London Philharmonic Orchestra, Bryden Thompson)
- Bax Winter Legends CHAN 8484 (London Philharmonic Orchestra, Bryden Thompson)
- Bloch Piano Works CHAN 9887
- Dukas Complete Piano Works CHAN 8765
- Falla Nights in the Gardens of Spain CHAN 8457 (London Symphony Orchestra, Geoffrey Simon)
- Finzi Eclogue SOMMCD 0653 (Chamber Ensemble of London, Peter Fisher)
- Grieg Piano Concerto CHAN 7040 (Ulster Orchestra, Vernon Handley)
- Howells Piano Works CHAN 9273
- Jenkins Concertino for piano & strings SOMMCD 0653 (Chamber Ensemble of London, Peter Fisher)
- Leighton Piano Works CHAN 9818
- Leighton Piano Works, Volume 2 CHAN 10601
- Moeran Third Rhapsody for piano & orchestra CHAN 7106 (Ulster Orchestra, Vernon Handley)
- Novak Songs of a Winter's Night / Pan CHAN 9489
- Stanford Piano Concerto no.2 / Concert Variations CHAN 7099 (Ulster Orchestra, Vernon Handley)
- Suk Piano Works CHAN 9026/7
- Tansman Piano Works CHAN 10527
- Collections:
- "Endless Song" – Encores for Piano CHAN 10826
- Piano Music of the Russian Mighty Handful CHAN 8439
- Piano Music of Tchaikovsky and his friends CHAN 9218
- Hommages to Haydn, Fauré and Roussel CHAN 8578
