= Rendcomb College =

Public school in Rendcomb near Cirencester, Gloucestershire, England

Coordinates: 51°47′15″N 1°58′35″W

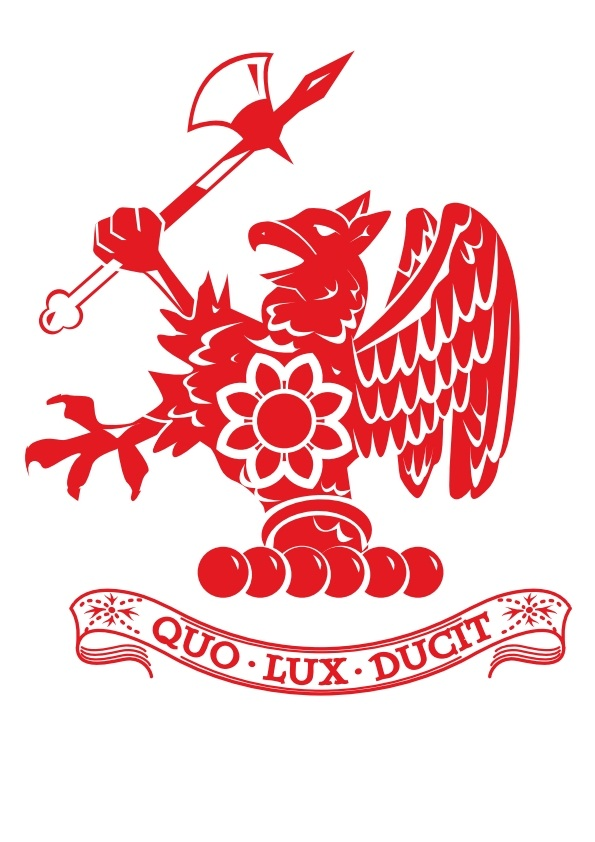
- Cirencester, Gloucestershire, GL7 7HA; England

Information
- Type: Public school Private day and boarding school
- Motto: Quo Lux Ducit (Where The Light Leads)
- Religious affiliation: Church of England
- Established: 1920
- Founder: Noel Wills
- Headteachers: Andy Murphy (Senior School); Gavin Roberts (Junior School)
- Gender: Co-educational
- Age: 3 to 18
- Enrolment: 350~
- Houses: Old Rec, Godman, Stable, Lawn and Park House
- Former pupils: Old Rendcombians
- Website: www.rendcombcollege.org.uk

Rendcomb College was a public school (English private boarding and day school) for pupils aged 3–18, located in the village of Rendcomb five miles north of Cirencester in Gloucestershire, England.

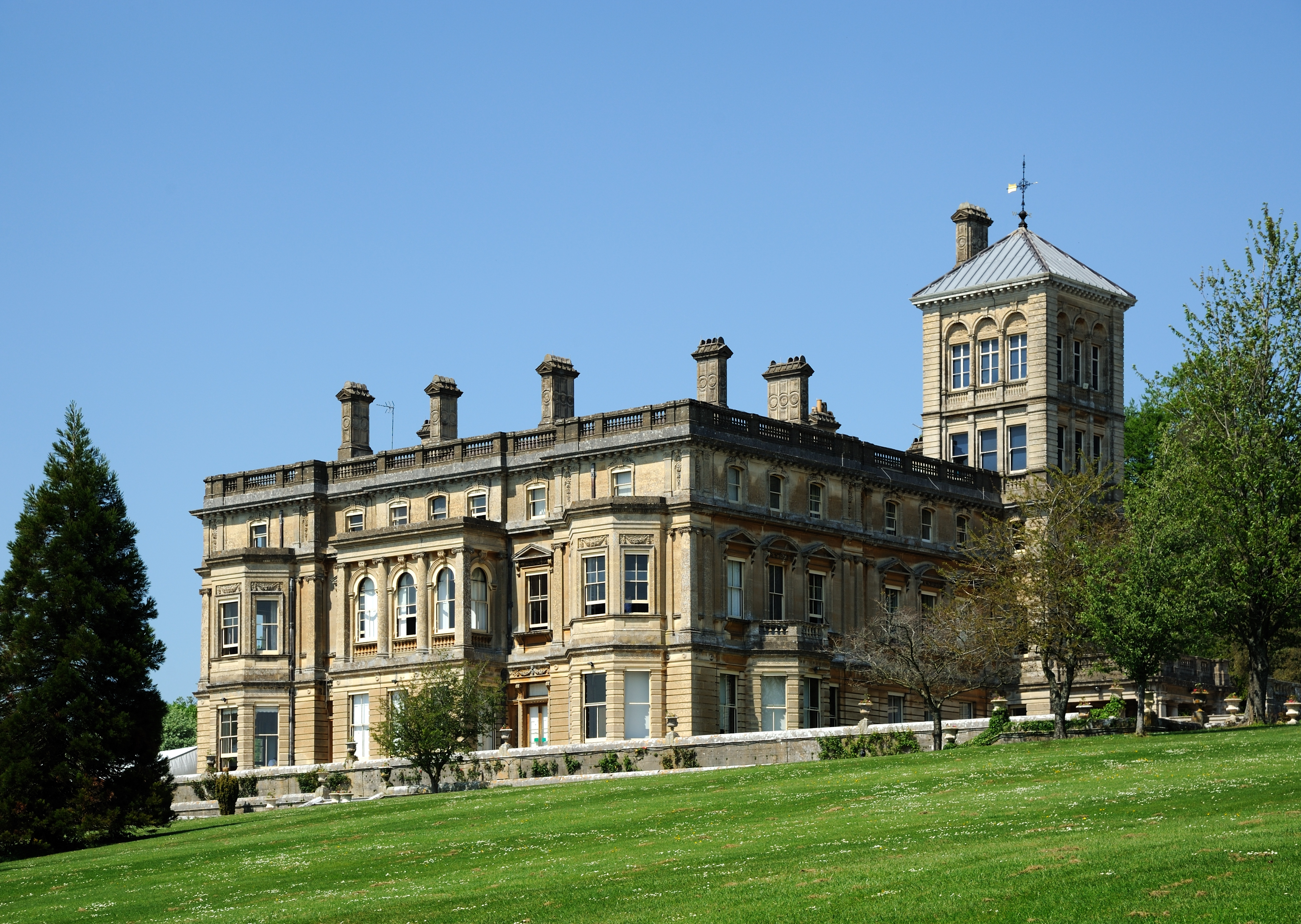
Rendcomb College

Rendcomb College was founded in 1920 by Frederick Noel Hamilton Wills (Noel Wills).

The school closed at the end of the 2025/26 academic year due to financial issues.

== History ==
In 1918, Noel Wills bought Rendcomb Park with a view to forming a 'Transition School' to provide a free boarding education to about forty boys from the elementary schools of Gloucestershire and prepare them for entry to public school. He envisaged that by giving them "the best possible education, some would gain entry by scholarship to public schools and perhaps, a few ultimately to University. This initial vision was broad and generous, involving supplements from the endowment to subsidise scholarships and leaving scholarships for those who could not secure entry to public schools for ‘assistance in beginning professions and trades".

On 2 June 1920 Rendcomb College opened with twelve boys, James Herbert Simpson as headmaster and Noel Wills as chair of governors. The two worked at the school for seven years.

== Closure ==
On 22 January 2026, Nicholas Ford, the Chairman of the Governors announced in a letter to parents that Rendcomb College would close at the end of summer term 2026, due to unsustainable financial pressures and declining student demand, despite financial support from the Rendcomb Foundation over the previous decade. The school's letter to parents listed as additional factors increases in energy costs, the effect of COVID-19, a rise in National Insurance costs for employers, and VAT on school fees.

== Buildings and grounds ==
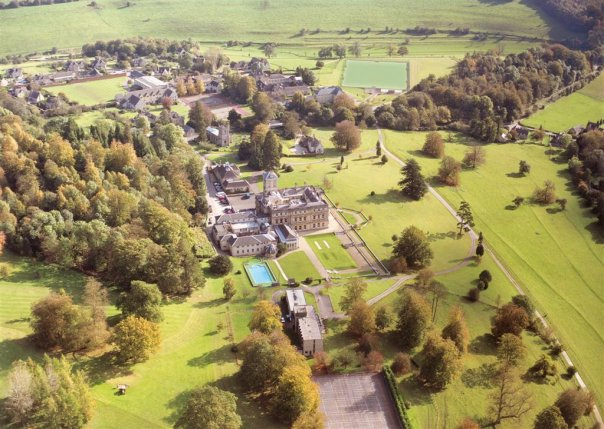
The school is set in over 200 acres of Cotswold Parkland

Rendcomb Park was established in 1544 and by 1676 held 250 acres. In 1086, two estates at Rendcomb were owned by Gilbert, son of Turold. Five hides had formerly belonged to Aluric and three to Walter, his son-in-law. These estates passed to the Earls of Gloucester by the late 12th century, and were subsequently sub-let to the De La Mare family. In 1255, Earl Richard de Clare reserved two plowlands for himself; that land became Rendcomb manor. From 1387 until 1503 the manor was held by Thomas and Robert De La Mare and their descendants. In 1503, Edmund Tame of Fairford obtained it and by marriage it passed to the Staffords in 1547. Richard Berkeley of Stoke Gifford obtained it in 1564. The Guises purchased it in 1635 but a Berkeley continued to live there until after 1661. During the period when the Berkeley family held it, Elizabeth I visited in 1592. Sir Thomas Roe lived at Rendcomb during the time his mother Dame Eleanor Berkeley owned the Manor (1608). As a rule, the Berkeley family were only visitors. The De La Mares and the Tames lived at the manor. The Guises built a new house there.

The original college buildings consist of a large mansion built in 1865 by Francis Goldsmid and designed by the architect Philip Hardwick; the stable block, where science, maths, languages, ICT and geography are taught, and the Old Rectory.

A wing was added to the main building in 1968 to provide sixth form study bedrooms, which subsequently evolved into the junior part of the School in 2000 for pupils aged 3–11. In October 2014 Rendcomb College was granted planning permission by Cotswold District Council for a multi-purpose performing arts centre.

The parish church, St Peter's, is on the school site. It dates back to the 12th century, though much of the current structure reflects a 16th-century rebuilding. The church has been described as being "of extreme interest to the student and amateur of the Perpendicular". The 12th century font in the church is regarded as one of the finest remaining Norman works in Britain.

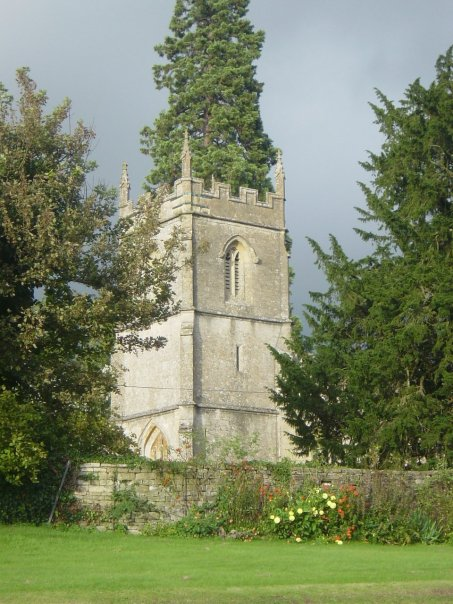
St Peter's Church

The college owns some 230 acres of land including the park, through which the River Churn flows from a lake near the northern boundary.

== Public benefit ==
Rendcomb College was founded to give students (boys as then was the case) from modest backgrounds a broad-ranging education in an inspirational setting. Boys who entered the School were either Gloucestershire Foundation Scholars (who were required to have attended for no fewer than two years one of the elementary schools in the county) – or Nominated Foundation Scholars – who were either at or would soon be at preparatory schools– and paid no fees. It was not until 1923 that the third class of entrants – fee-payers – was admitted. A History of Rendcomb College (1976) describes seven characteristics of the School nurtured by Simpson and Wills; the first and most important of these is "The Social Mixture" – "Rendcomb's most unusual feature. Old boys describe it as the School's ‘greatest strength’ and Simpson's ‘greatest success'"

Rendcomb's links with the state system in the county was also pioneering and unusual. From 1922, a small grant of £120 p.a. was made to the college by the Gloucestershire Education Committee as a token of appreciation for the college's services to the county. The Gloucestershire Foundation Scholarships benefited 67 pupils from (1920–1934) and 260 pupils (from 1934 to 1978). Other scholarships and awards were given and on average, 33% of Rendcomb's students from 1934 to 1978 each year received significant financial assistance. In 1970, to celebrate the fiftieth anniversary of the school, a new scholarship, named for Noel Wills, was set up to pay full fees for a student from a Gloucestershire primary school to attend Rendcomb.

== Notable former pupils ==
- Kojo Annan, son of UN Secretary-General Kofi Annan; while at Rendcomb, he was a successful rugby player
- Lionel Crawford, British cancer expert and virologist.
- Richard Dunwoody, retired National Hunt racing jockey
- David Mabberley, Keeper of the Herbarium, Library, Art and Archives at the Royal Botanic Gardens, Kew, ex-Director of the Center for Urban Horticulture at the University of Washington in Seattle, president of the IAPT, ex-Dean of Wadham College, Oxford
- John Middleton Murry, Jr., writer who used the names Colin Murry and Richard Cowper
- Angus Primrose, yacht designer
- Tim Shaw, better known as Tim Exile, dance/electronic music musician.
- David Tyler, businessman, Chairman of Sainsbury's
- David Vaisey, historian and archivist, formerly Bodley's Librarian at the University of Oxford, 1986–96, now Librarian Emeritus
- Nicolas Walter, anarchist and atheist writer, speaker and activist
- Nicholas Wapshott, journalist and writer, expert on Keynes and Hayek
