= Peter Copley (composer) =

British composer, cellist and pianist

Peter Copley (born 1962) is a British composer, cellist and pianist.

== Biography ==
Copley was born in 1962 in Hove, England. As a boy, Copley was a pupil at Brighton College; he went on to study composition at the Royal Academy of Music and privately with Hans Keller. In 1985, he was awarded a Polish government scholarship to study at the Akademia Muzyczna in Kraków with Marek Stachowski. He subsequently completed a master's degree and Doctorate at the University of Sussex.

Copley studied at the Dartington International Summer School in 1981 and 1983; in 2000 he made the first of several visits as a teacher and featured composer. He has been a visiting tutor at Sussex and Oxford University and an Associate Lecturer for the Open University, where he was also a Research Associate for the Music Faculty. A significant part of his output consists of educational music.

In 1994, Peter Copley co-founded New Music Brighton, a collective of composers working in the Sussex region.

His many works include Farnham Fantasia for strings, performed in both the Royal Festival and Royal Albert Halls and the Concerto for Trumpet, Strings and Percussion which received its first performance by John Wallace and the Brighton Philharmonic Orchestra conducted by Barry Wordsworth in the orchestra’s 75th Birthday Weekend.

1999 commissions included Miniature Overture for the Schubert Ensemble, and Unfrozen Architecture for Southern Winds. In 2001, Peter wrote A City Awakes, a large-scale work commissioned by the Brighton & Hove Philharmonic Society in celebration of Brighton and Hove’s elevation to city status. This was first performed by the Brighton Philharmonic orchestra in October 2002.

Other compositions include The Midnight Skaters for voice and orchestra, commissioned by the Brighton Youth Orchestra and first performed at the 2010 Brighton Festival with Sir John Tomlinson, Concert Fantasy for mandolin commissioned by Alison Stephens for the 2010 Dartington International Summer School.

In 2012, Peter celebrated his half century with the first performances of his String Quartet no.2 (2011), composed for the Stanford Quartet and Three Motets, commissioned by St Bartholomew’s Church, Brighton. In May 2013, Expiry TBC, a multimedia work funded by the Arts Council written in collaboration with writer Mark Hewitt including music for electronically enhanced cello was given its first performances at the Brighton Festival Fringe.

Other compositions from this period include a Piano Concerto (2014), funded by the Arts Council composed for Margaret Fingerhut and first performed by her in Brighton with the Musicians of All Saints and in London with Trinity Laban Sinfonia, Two Carols, performed and broadcast by the BBC Singers in December 2017 and Aubade for piano, commissioned by Margaret Fingerhut, which received its first performance at the Altes Rathaus, Vienna on October 24, 2017.

2018–19 commissions included music for a multimedia installation, funded by the Arts Council with live performance based on a re-imagining of Hans Christian Anderson’s The Snow Queen with writer Maria Jastrzᶒbska and artist Dagmara Rudkin, and Salamanca 1936, a secular oratorio for bass solo chorus and orchestra based on an incident that took place in the early days of the Spanish Civil War. This received its first two performances in February and March 2020 just before lock-down, given at the Old Royal Naval College Chapel in Greenwich and at St Bartholomew’s Church, Brighton by Sir John Tomlinson, students from Trinity Laban Conservatoire and the Brighton Youth Orchestra conducted by Andrew Sherwood.

2020s compositions include music for the play Prison Dialogues (Brighton Festival 2021) and Music of Exile for viola and 13 solo strings, an Arts Council funded collaboration with exiled Syrian viola player Raghad Haddad, incorporating Arabic folk scales.

Since 2022, Copley's music has been published by Composers Edition

== Selected works ==
- Concerto for Trumpet, Strings and Percussion (1996) premiered by John Wallace and the Brighton Philharmonic Orchestra conducted by Barry Wordsworth in the orchestra’s 75th Birthday Weekend
- Farnham Fantasia (1998) commissioned by the Farnham Festival of Music for Youth
- Miniature Overture (1999) commissioned for the Schubert Ensemble
- Unfrozen Architecture (1999) commissioned for Southern Winds.
- A City Awakes (2001) commissioned by the Brighton & Hove Philharmonic Society in celebration of Brighton and Hove’s elevation to city status.
- Concerto for Flute, Strings and Harp (2003)
- A Song to the Dawn for Soprano Solo, Chorus and Orchestra (2006), commissioned by the Brighton Festival
- Fantasy Sonata for Clarinet and Piano (2007), written for Steve Dummer and Yoko Ono
- Gridshell Symphonies for trombone quartet and string quartet (2008), commissioned for the Arts Council's Architecture 08 festival.
- Sealife Stomp for percussion ensemble (2009), commissioned by Brighton & Hove Music Service
- The Midnight Skaters for voice and orchestra (2009), commissioned by the Brighton Youth Orchestra
- String Quartet No.2 (2009, rev 2011), composed for the Stanford Quartet
- A Copper Garland (versions for full orchestra and string orchestra)
- Dementia Diaries, incidental music for the play by Maria Jastrzebska, for flute and cello
- Partita for Piano Quartet (2009)
- Three Motets (2011), commissioned by St Bartholomew’s Church, Brighton
- Concerto for piano and string orchestra (2014) funded by the Arts Council composed for Margaret Fingerhut and first performed by her in Brighton with the Musicians of All Saints and in London with Trinity Laban Sinfonia
- Two Carols for SATB choir (2012), performed and broadcast by the BBC Singers in December 2017
- Aubade for piano solo (2017) commissioned by Margaret Fingerhut
- Salamanca 1936 for bass solo, chorus and orchestra (2018)
- Music of Exile for solo viola and thirteen solo strings (2021)

== Recordings ==
- Miniature Overture, on the album Bright Future (NMC Records, 2003), perf'd by The Schubert Ensemble of London
