= Stroud General Hospital =

- Gloucestershire Health and Care NHS Foundation Trust
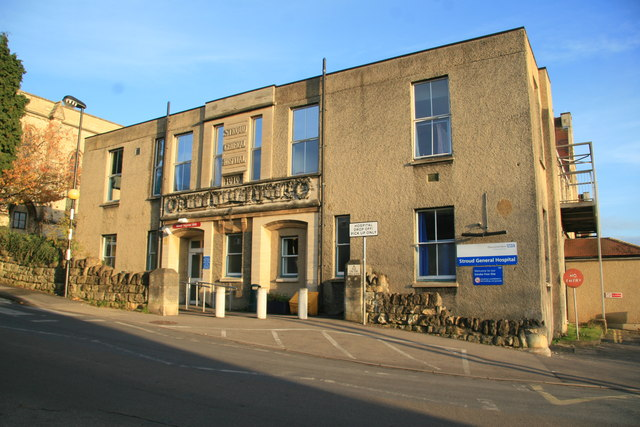
- Stroud General Hospital

- Shown in Gloucestershire

Geography
- Location: Trinity Road, Stroud, Gloucestershire, England
- Coordinates: 51.7429°N 2.2079°W

Organisation
- Care system: NHS
- Type: Community

History
- Founded: 1750

Links
- Lists: Hospitals in England

Stroud General Hospital is a health facility in Trinity Road in Stroud, Gloucestershire, England. It is managed by Gloucestershire Health and Care NHS Foundation Trust.

== History ==
The facility has its origins in the Stroud Dispensary which was established in a room at the Lamb Inn in Church Street in 1750. After the dispensary had moved to permanent facilities at the corner of Bedford Street and George Street in 1823, an extension to create a proper hospital was completed in 1835. The current facility at Trinity Road was officially opened by the Bishop of Gloucester in December 1875. The hospital joined the National Health Service in 1948 and the maternity unit was completed in 1953. In February 2012 NHS managers agreed to halt plans for the hospital to be run by a social enterprise after local residents mounted a legal challenge in the High Court. Parts of the hospital were refurbished in 2012 and in 2018.
