= David Tyler (businessman) =

British business executive

- Born: David Alan Tyler; 23 January 1953 (age 73)
- Education: Rendcomb College; Trinity Hall, Cambridge
- Occupation: Business executive
- Years active: 1974–present
- Title: Chair of PZ Cussons
- Term: 2022–present
- Predecessor: Caroline Silver
- Spouse: Margaret Fingerhut
- Children: 2

David Alan Tyler (born 23 January 1953) is a British business executive and the chairman of Domestic & General and PZ Cussons. He is also chair of the Parker Review. He is a former chair of Sainsbury's, Logica, and Hammerson and a former chief financial officer of GUS.

== Early life ==
Tyler was educated at Rendcomb College from 1965 to 1970. He then studied economics at Trinity Hall, Cambridge from 1971 to 1974, earning a bachelor's degree in 1974 and a master's degree in 1978.

== Career ==
In 1974, Tyler joined Unilever as a management trainee. He worked there at Birds Eye, Wall's Ice Cream, BOCM Silcock and at Unilever's London headquarters on corporate strategy and on its agribusiness activities. He also qualified with CIMA as a management accountant, later becoming a FCMA and also a member of the Association of Corporate Treasurers.

He then worked for National Westminster Bank as group financial controller and finance director of NatWest Investment Bank between 1986 and 1989. He was a witness in the Blue Arrow trial in 1991 when NatWest and a number of its senior executives were accused of misleading the market in 1987 about the largest ever rights issue in London. He was recruited as group finance director by Christie's, spending seven years there, which included two in New York City as president of Christie's American business.

Tyler was the finance director of GUS from 1997 to 2006. During this period, GUS acquired Argos and many Experian businesses, as well as divesting a number of companies. Finally, it was split into three UK listed companies – Burberry, Experian and Home Retail Group – and a South African one, Lewis Stores.

In 2007, Tyler was appointed chair of 3i Quoted Private Equity Plc and Logica.

In 2009, Tyler was appointed chair of J. Sainsbury plc, a position he held until 2019.

In 2013, he was appointed chair of Hammerson plc, which he held until 2020.

In 2020, Tyler was appointed chair of The White Company, a role he held until 2022.

In 2021, Tyler was appointed chair of retail technology company Imagr until 2023.

In 2022, he was appointed chair of JoJo Maman Bebe until 2024.

He has been a non-executive director of Burberry (2002 to 2015), Experian (2006 to 2012), Reckitt Benckiser (2007–09), and Rubix (2020–21).

He is also chair of the Government backed Parker Review on ethnic diversity in UK business, having been its co-chair previously from 2015 to 2022. Tyler was chair of Hampstead Theatre from 2012 to 2020. He has also been a senior advisor to Jefferies since 2024.

== Personal life ==
He has two children and four grandchildren and lives in central London and Sussex. He is married to Margaret Fingerhut, a concert pianist.
