= Wills baronets =

Set index for Wills baronets

There have been four baronetcies created for members of the Wills family, owners of W. D. & H. O. Wills and major shareholders and directors of the Imperial Tobacco Company. All four creations were in the Baronetage of the United Kingdom.

- Wills baronets of Blagdon (1893): see Baron Winterstoke
- Wills baronets of Northmoor and Manor Heath (1897): see Baron Dulverton
- Wills baronets of Hazelwood and Clapton-in-Gordano (1904)
- Wills baronets of Blagdon (1923), second creation
