= Sir Frederick Wills, 1st Baronet =

British businessman and politician

Sir Frederick Wills

Member of Parliament for Bristol North
- In office 1900–1906
- Preceded by: Lewis Fry
- Succeeded by: Augustine Birrell

Personal details
- Born: 22 November 1838 Bristol, Gloucestershire
- Died: 18 February 1909 (aged 70)
- Party: Liberal Unionist
- Spouse: Annie Hamilton
- Children: Gilbert Wills Frederick Noel Hamilton Wills
- Parent: Henry Overton Wills II (father)
- Occupation: Businessman

Sir Frederick Wills, 1st Baronet (22 November 1838 – 18 February 1909) was a businessman, philanthropist and politician in the United Kingdom. He was a director of W. D. & H. O. Wills, a famous tobacco company headquartered in Bristol which later merged into the Imperial Tobacco Company.

Wills was educated at Amersham Hall and served as the Liberal Unionist Member of Parliament (MP) for Bristol North from 1900 to 1906. He was made a Baronet in 1897, of Northmoor in the County of Somerset, & Manor Heath in the County of Hampshire. He also served as the president of the Anchor Society in Bristol in 1882, and was a governor of Guy's Hospital in London until his death in 1909. The Wills Library at the GKT School of Medical Education is named in his honour; he was its primary benefactor.

== Family ==
Frederick Wills was a son of Henry Overton Wills II & Isabella Board. He married Annie, daughter of Reverend James Hamilton, in 1867. He died in February 1909, and was succeeded in the baronetcy by his son Gilbert, who was created Baron Dulverton in 1929. Annie, Lady Wills, died in 1910. Sir Frederick's third son was Frederick Noel Hamilton Wills.

He was a brother of Henry Overton Wills III, Sir Edward Payson Wills, a half brother of Sir Frank William Wills, and a cousin of William Henry Wills Lord Winterstoke.

Seats - Northmoor, Dulverton, Somerset, & Manor Heath, Bournemouth.

London residence - 9 Kensington Palace Gardens, London.

Parliament of the United Kingdom
Preceded by Lewis Fry	Member of Parliament for Bristol North; 1900–1906	Succeeded by Augustine Birrell
Baronetage of the United Kingdom
New creation	Baronet (of Northmoor); 1897–1909	Succeeded by Gilbert Wills
