= Blagdon =

Village in Somerset, England

Coordinates: 51.327°N 2.717°W

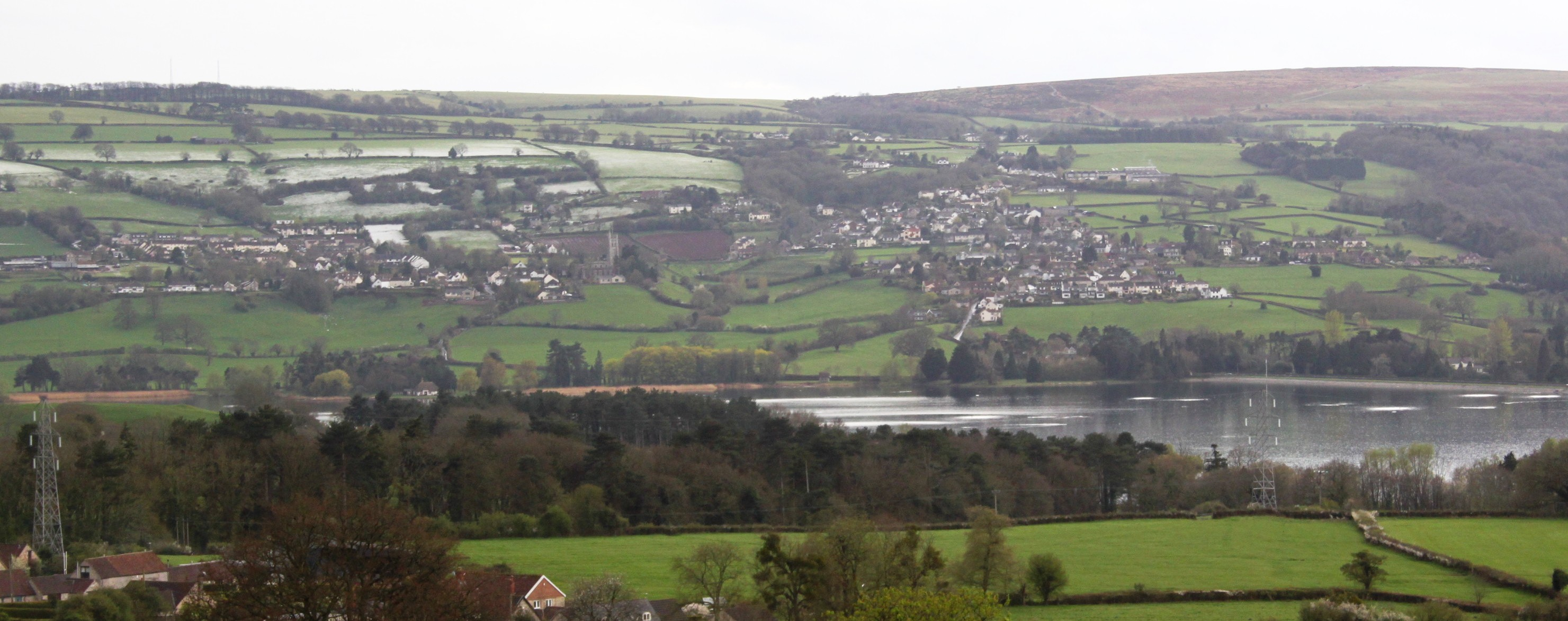
- Blagdon with the lake in the foreground

- Location within Somerset
- Population: 1,116 (2011)
- OS grid reference: ST500589
- Unitary authority: North Somerset
- Ceremonial county: Somerset
- Region: South West
- Country: England
- Sovereign state: United Kingdom
- Post town: BRISTOL
- Postcode district: BS40
- Dialling code: 01761
- Police: Avon and Somerset
- Fire: Avon
- Ambulance: South Western
- UK Parliament: Wells and Mendip Hills

Blagdon is a village and civil parish in the ceremonial county of Somerset, within the unitary authority of North Somerset, in England. It is located in the Mendip Hills, a recognised Area of Outstanding Natural Beauty. According to the 2021 census it has a population of 1,184. The village is about 12 miles (19 km) east of Weston-super-Mare and 12 miles (19 km) south west of Bristol, on the A368 road to Bath.

== History ==
The village was called Blachedon in the 1086 Domesday Book and the name comes from the Old English bloec and dun meaning 'the black or bleak down'.

=== Romans ===
There was a Roman presence in Blagdon from about 49 AD until the end of the Roman occupation of Britain. Several Roman coins and fragments of Roman pottery have been found in the village. There were lead and silver workings in Charterhouse, about a mile and a half uphill to the south, so it is likely that the wealthier supervisors had their houses away from the toxic smoke in the village. Wade and Wade in their 1929 book Somerset suggest traces of Roman mining such as tools and pigs of lead have been found at Blagdon.

=== Saxons ===
The parish was part of the Hundred of Winterstoke.

=== Norman feudal barony ===
Blagdon is believed to have been the caput of the feudal barony held by Serlo de Burci (died c. 1086), who is recorded as holding the manor in the Domesday Book of 1086. However the caput may have been Dartington. The Domesday Book recorded a land area for Blagdon approximating to 2,000 acres (8 km^{2}), including 200 acres (0.8 km^{2}) of woodland. Serlo left no sons and his daughter Geva was his sole heiress. She married twice: firstly to "Martin" (died before 1086), to whom she bore a son and heir Robert FitzMartin (died 1159), and secondly to William de Falaise. In 1154 Robert FitzMartin gave St Andrew's Church and other land from around the East End of the village to Stanley Abbey in Wiltshire. He also gave land at Blagdon to the Knights Templar which became known as the Temple Hydon Estate. Robert's son was William FitzMartin (1155–1209), whose own son and heir was William FitzMartin (died before 15 February 1216). Next to inherit was Nicholas FitzMartin (1210–1282) whose son Nicholas (died 1260)predeceased him, but had married the sole heiress of the feudal barony of Barnstaple, Maud de Tracy (died before Michaelmas 1279), daughter and sole heiress of Henry de Tracy (died 1274). Nicholas's son William FitzMartin (died 1324) thus inherited Barnstaple from his mother and Blagdon from his grandfather. On the death in 1326 of William's son William without children, his co-heirs were his surviving sister Eleanor and James Audley (died 1386) the son of his deceased sister Joan FitzMartin (died 1322). Eleanor FitzMartin (died 1342) died without children, albeit having married twice. James Audley, 2nd Baron Audley (died 1386) was Joan's son by her second husband Nicholas Audley, 1st Baron Audley (died 1316) of Heleigh Castle, Staffordshire. James Audley thus in 1342 inherited his childless aunt Eleanor's moieties of the two baronies of Barnstaple and Blagdon, thus giving him possession of the whole of each.

=== The Blagdon Controversy ===
In the late eighteenth century, the famous writer and educational pioneer Hannah More, shocked at the poverty and ignorance to be found in Mendip villages, was active establishing schools in the area. In 1795 she founded a Sunday School in Blagdon, in the building now called Hannah More House. About this time she wrote to William Wilberforce, the anti-slavery campaigner, about her school, "Several of the grown-up youths had been tried at the last assizes; three were children of a person lately condemned to be hanged — many thieves! Of this banditti we have enlisted one hundred and seventy; and when the clergyman, a hard man, who is also the magistrate, saw these creatures kneeling around us, whom he had seldom seen but to commit or punish in some way, he burst into tears".

However, Mr Bere, the curate referred to in this letter, soon became implacably opposed to the school and after years of pressure it was forced to close. Nevertheless, the furor created made the "Blagdon Controversy" a milestone of national importance in the development of education for the labouring classes.

=== Physical history ===
There are several houses in the village dating from medieval times and earlier. The houses facing on to Bell Square in the north corner of the West End date from the fourteenth century. The shape of some of the existing fields suggest they are of medieval origin.

=== Blagdon in the twentieth century ===
In 1901 the Wrington Vale Light Railway reached Blagdon. It closed to passengers just 30 years later in 1931. Part of the line remained for freight only, but this closed in 1962.

== Governance ==
The parish council has responsibility for local issues, including setting an annual precept (local rate) to cover the council’s operating costs and producing annual accounts for public scrutiny. The parish council evaluates local planning applications and works with the local police, district council officers, and neighbourhood watch groups on matters of crime, security, and traffic. The parish council's role also includes initiating projects for the maintenance and repair of parish facilities, such as the village hall or community centre, playing fields and playgrounds, as well as consulting with the district council on the maintenance, repair, and improvement of highways, drainage, footpaths, public transport, and street cleaning. Conservation matters (including trees and listed buildings) and environmental issues are also of interest to the council.

Blagdon and Churchill Ward is represented by one councillor - currently Cllr Patrick Keating - on the unitary authority of North Somerset which was created in 1996, as established by the Local Government Act 1992. It provides a single tier of local government with responsibility for almost all local government functions within its area including local planning and building control, local roads, council housing, environmental health, markets and fairs, refuse collection, recycling, cemeteries, crematoria, leisure services, parks, and tourism. It is also responsible for education, social services, libraries, main roads, public transport, trading standards, waste disposal and strategic planning, although fire, police and ambulance services are provided jointly with other authorities through the Avon Fire and Rescue Service, Avon and Somerset Constabulary and the South Western Ambulance Service.

North Somerset's area covers part of the ceremonial county of Somerset but it is administered independently of the non-metropolitan county. Its administrative headquarters is in the town hall in Weston-super-Mare. Between 1 April 1974 and 1 April 1996, it was the Woodspring district of the county of Avon. Before 1974 that the parish was part of the Axbridge Rural District.

The parish is represented in the House of Commons of the Parliament of the United Kingdom as part of the Wells and Mendip Hills. It was also part of the South West England constituency of the European Parliament, prior to Britain leaving the European Union in January 2020..

== Geography ==
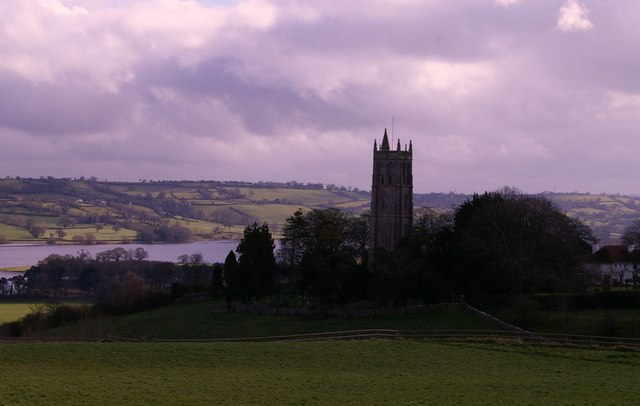
Church tower with the lake behind

The village is located on the northern edge of the Mendip Hills on the A368, overlooking Blagdon Lake. The headquarters of the dairy company Yeo Valley Organic is located in the village.

When describing Blagdon the names of the three former separate settlements that merged to form Blagdon are usually used: West End, East End, and Street End.

A road serving some housing is named Baynard Close after the Lord of the Manor of Blagdon who founded the forerunner of the current village school in 1687. The New Inn is a Grade II listed building.

== Demographics ==
According to the 2001 Census, the Blagdon and Churchill Ward had 1,423 residents, living in 594 households, with an average age of 41.9 years. Of these 75% of residents described their health as 'good', 19% of 16- to 74-year-olds had no qualifications; and the area had an unemployment rate of 1.2% of all economically active people aged 16–74. In the Index of Multiple Deprivation 2004, it was ranked at 24,228 out of 32,482 wards in England, where 1 was the most deprived LSOA and 32,482 the least deprived. The 2011 Census highlights that the population had dropped to 1,116 within 737 hectares of land. 938 of these people were of working age and 155 had no qualifications. The 2021 census puts the population at 1,184 a slight increase over the previous 10 years

== Transport ==
Blagdon has no public bus services. The Blagdon Valley Minibus Association operates a community minibus available for groups to use at a small charge as well as running trips to nearby centres such as Wells, Weston-super-Mare, Clevedon and Bath. The nearest railway station is Yatton. Blagdon formerly had its own railway station as the terminus of the Wrington Vale Light Railway from 1901 to 1931 (freight traffic continued until 1950).

== Religious sites ==
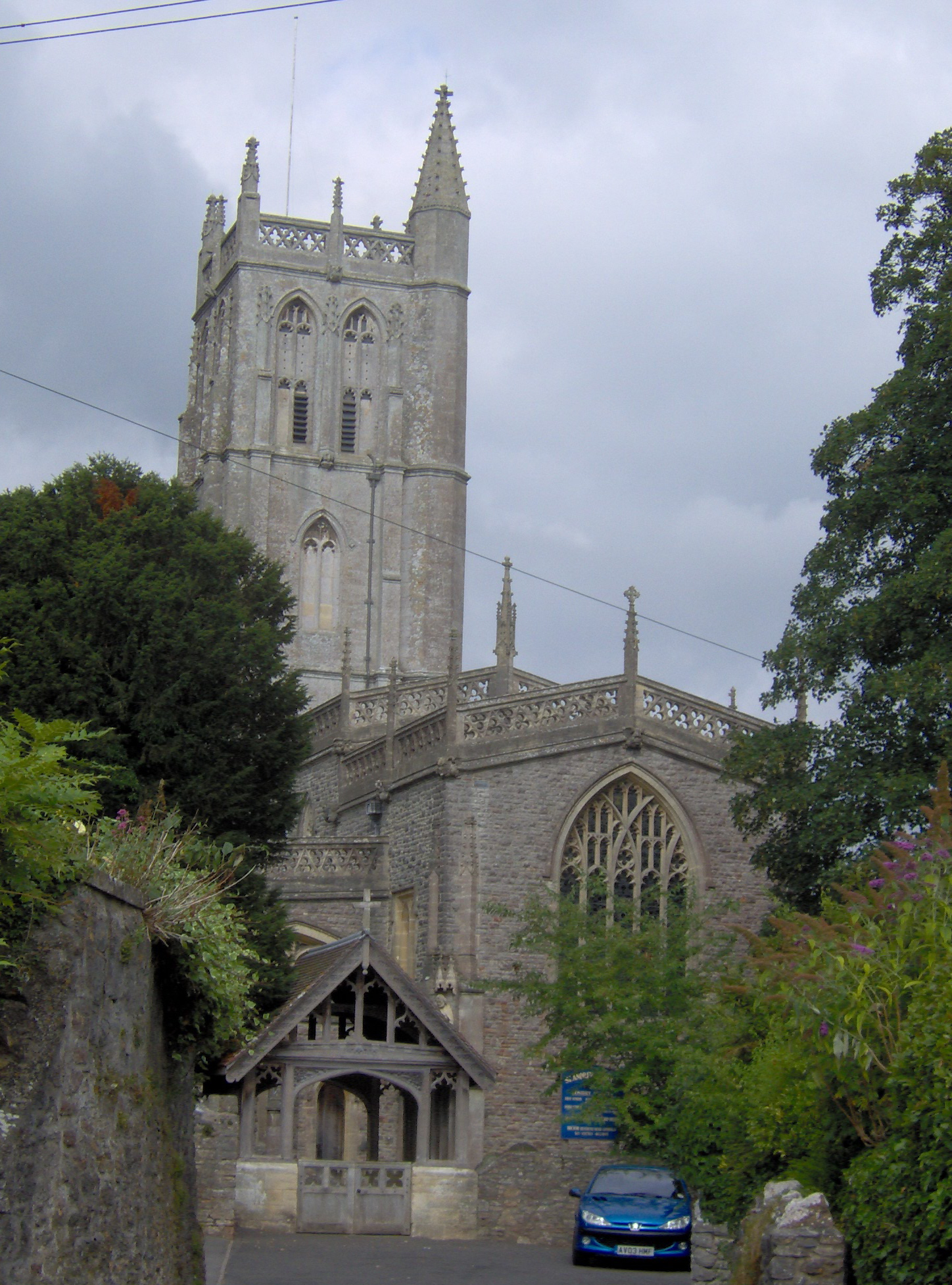
St Andrew’s Church

St Andrew's Church (Church of England) has a 116-foot tower with pinnacles and a cusped lozenge-pattern parapet, with a stair turret spirelet in the north-east corner. The tower dates from the 15th century and is one of the tallest in Somerset. The remainder of the church was rebuilt in 1907–09 by Lord Winterstoke (of the Wills tobacco family). The tower used to contain a bell, since recast, dating from 1716 and made by Edward Bilbie of the Bilbie family. It is a Grade II* listed building. The lychgate to the east of the church is also a Grade II listed building in its own right. Above the door are four primitive Norman carvings which have survived three rebuildings.

There is also a former Baptist chapel currently used by Triggerstuff, a not for profit company running community events nationally, whilst the former Methodist chapel is now residential housing.

== Culture ==
Blagdon is the setting of Chapters 8 and 9 of Victor Canning's best-selling novel of 1934, Mr Finchley Discovers his England.

Blagdon has many clubs and organisations including:

- The local History Group
- W.I
- Luncheon Club
- Rainbows ~ www.blagdonrainbows.co.uk, Brownies and Guides
- Scouts
- Tennis, football, cricket and rugby clubs

== Famous residents ==
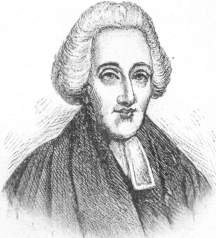
Augustus Montague Toplady

- John Langhorne (1735–79)
- Augustus Montague Toplady (1740–78)
- Sir William Henry Wills, 1st Baron Winterstoke (1830 -1911) who was the first chairman of Imperial Tobacco.
- Sir George Alfred Wills, Baronet of Blagdon (1854 - 1928) President of Imperial Tobacco.

== Listed buildings ==
There are several Grade II listed buildings:

- Aldwick Court
- Lodge to south-west of Woodlands
- Stables and Archway at Aldwick Court
- Woodlands
- Bay Trees
- Hannah More House
- The Old Rectory and Wing Cottage
- Fir Tree Farmhouse and attached outbuildings
- Blagdon Court and Court Cottage
- Blagdon House
- Court Farmhouse
- Walnut Tree House
- Coombe Lodge
- Gate Lodge and Gates south of Coombe Lodge
- Gauge House
- Masonic Lodge
- Mill House

== Bibliography ==
- Blagdon Village Website
- Blagdon Village Plan Document
