= Gilbert Wills, 1st Baron Dulverton =

British politician

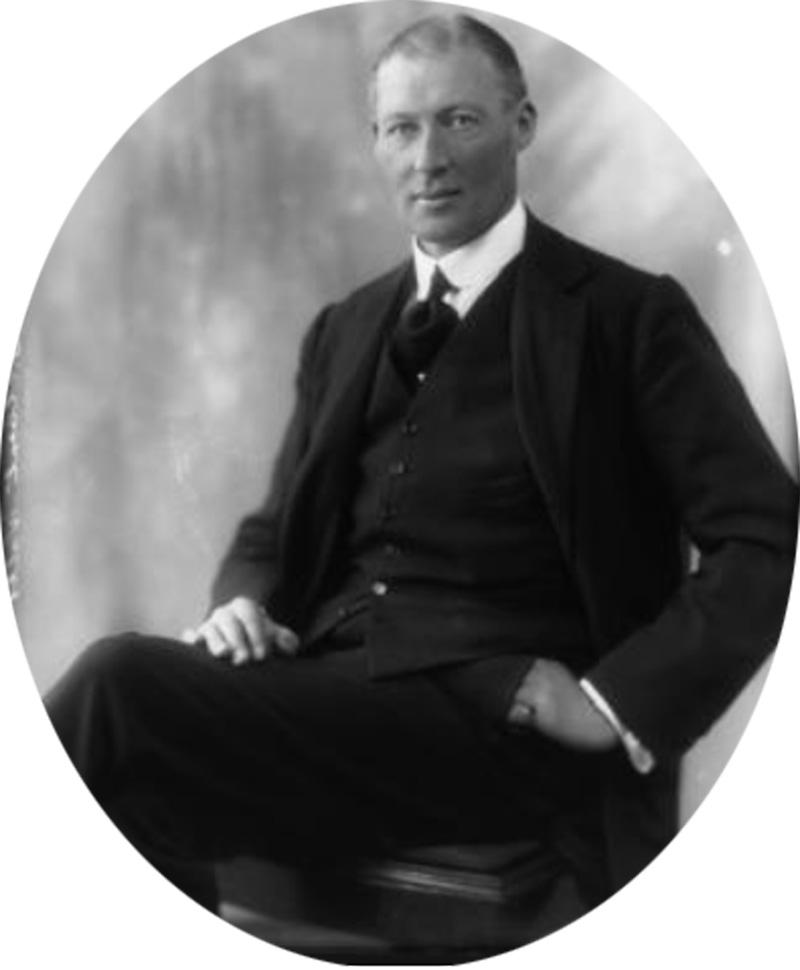
Gilbert Wills, Lord Dulverton

Gilbert Alan Hamilton Wills, 1st Baron Dulverton (28 March 1880 – 1 December 1956), also known by Sir Gilbert Wills, 2nd Baronet of Northmoor & Manor Heath, was a British businessman and Conservative Member of Parliament from 1909 to 1929.

== Family ==
Wills was the son of Sir Frederick Wills, 1st Baronet, and his wife Annie (née Hamilton). The Wills family were owners of W. D. & H. O. Wills, tobacco importers and cigarette manufacturers, which later became part of Imperial Tobacco. Wills was President of the latter company and also served as a Member of Parliament for Taunton from 1912 to 1918 and for Weston-super-Mare from 1918 to 1922. In the 1929 Dissolution Honours he was raised to the peerage as Baron Dulverton, of Batsford in the County of Gloucester.

Lord Dulverton married Victoria May, daughter of Sir Edward Chichester, 9th Baronet, in 1914. He died in December 1956, aged 76, and was succeeded in his titles by his son Anthony.

== Notes ==
Parliament of the United Kingdom
Preceded by William Peel	Member of Parliament for Taunton; 1912–1918	Succeeded by Dennis Boles
New constituency	Member of Parliament for Weston-super-Mare; 1918–1922	Succeeded by The Lord Erskine
Peerage of the United Kingdom
New creation	Baron Dulverton; 1929–1956	Succeeded by Frederick Wills
Baronetage of the United Kingdom
Preceded by Frederick Wills	Baronet (of Northmoor); 1909–1956	Succeeded by Frederick Wills
