= William Wills, 1st Baron Winterstoke =

British businessman, philanthropist and Liberal politician

The Right Honourable The Lord Winterstoke
- Sir William Wills

Member of the British Parliament for Coventry
- In office 1880–1885 Serving with: Sir Henry Mather Jackson 1880–1881; Henry Eaton 1881–1885
- Preceded by: Henry Eaton; Henry Mather Jackson
- Succeeded by: Henry Eaton

Member of the British Parliament for Bristol East
- In office 1895–1900
- Preceded by: Sir Joseph Dodge Weston
- Succeeded by: Charles Hobhouse

Personal details
- Born: 1 September 1830
- Died: 29 January 1911 (aged 80)
- Party: Liberal
- Parent: William Day Wills (father)
- Relatives: Sir Frederick Wills (cousin); Sir Frank William Wills (cousin); Henry Overton Wills III (cousin)

William Henry Wills, 1st Baron Winterstoke (1 September 1830 – 29 January 1911), known as Sir William Wills, Bt., between 1893 and 1906, was a British businessman, philanthropist and Liberal politician.

== Background ==
Wills was the son of William Day Wills and a cousin of Sir Edward Payson Wills Bt, Sir Frederick Wills Bt, Sir Frank William Wills Kt, and Henry Overton Wills III, first chancellor of the University of Bristol.

== Business career ==
A member of the wealthy Bristol tobacco-importing Wills family, Wills joined the family firm at an early age. In 1858 he went into partnership with two of his cousins to take over W. D. & H. O. Wills, which later became part of the Imperial Tobacco Company, of which he was the first chairman. Recognised as the head of the tobacco industry in Britain, he was also Chairman of the Bristol Chamber of Commerce. In 1904 he presented the Bristol City Museum and Art Gallery to the people of Bristol.

== Political career ==
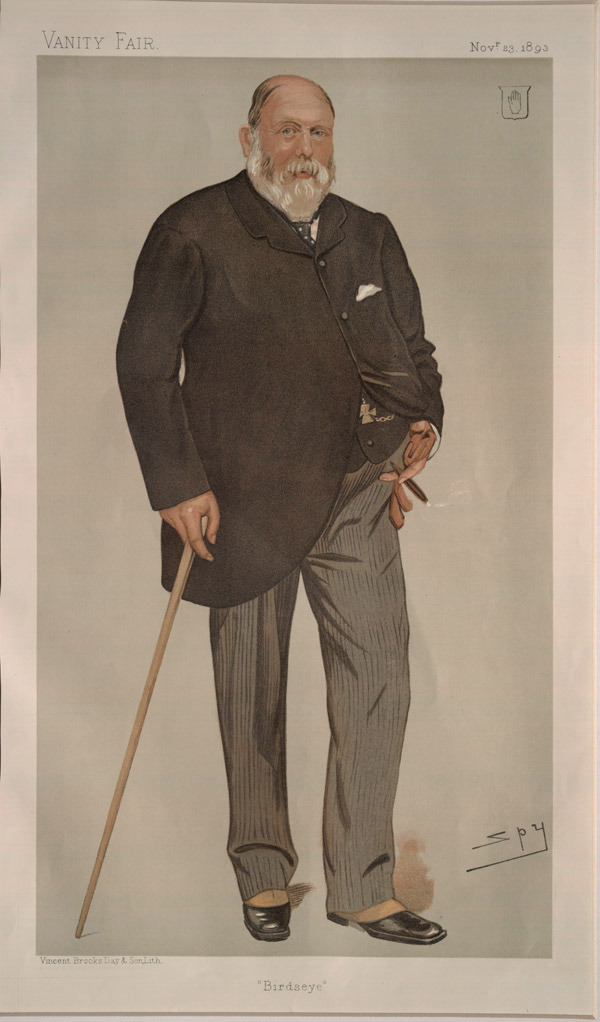
"Birdseye". Caricature by Spy published in Vanity Fair in 1893

Baron Winterstoke arms, also those of the baronetcy

Wills was a member of the Bristol Corporation from 1862 to 1880 and sheriff of the city from 1877 to 1878. He also sat as Liberal Member of Parliament (MP) for two separate five-year periods: for Coventry from 1880 to 1885, and for Bristol East from 1895 to 1900. He served as High Sheriff of Somerset in 1905.

He was made a Baronet, of Coombe Lodge in the Parish of Blagdon in the County of Somerset, on 12 August 1893 and raised to the peerage as Baron Winterstoke, of Blagdon in the County of Somerset, in 1906. He took his title from the ancient hundred of Winterstoke, in which his home at Blagdon lay.

== Personal life ==
Wills was educated at Mill Hill School, before joining the family tobacco business.

Lord Winterstoke was a keen supporter of the arts, serving as President of what is now the Royal West of England Academy (RWA) from 1898 until his death in 1911 and donating the money to create Bristol City Art Gallery, whose facade bears the inscription "The Gift of Sir William Henry Wills to his Fellow Citizens 1904".

He was also the president of the charitable Anchor Society in Bristol in 1866, and vice-president of Waverley Football Club from 1890.

A zealous nonconformist by personal conviction as well as by family tradition, he actively engaged in the affairs of the free churches. He joined the board of the Dissenting Deputies, was a trustee of the Memorial Hall in London, and took a practical interest in the refoundation of Mansfield College, Oxford in 1886. To the new chapel of Mill Hill School, opened in June 1898, he gave an organ and other substantial help; his portrait, subscribed for by the governors, is at the school.

He married Elizabeth Perkins Stancomb on 11 January 1853, in Melksham, Wiltshire. Elizabeth was born 6 November 1831 in Trowbridge, Wiltshire and died at their seaside home of East Court, Ramsgate, Kent on 10 February 1896, and was buried in Ramsgate Cemetery, Plot D.C.189. They adopted Elizabeth's two nieces.

He died without heirs in January 1911, aged 80, when the baronetcy and barony became extinct. His estate was worth £2,548,209 (roughly equivalent to £259,514,718 in 2025). A portrait of Lord Winterstoke hangs in the Middle Common Room of Mansfield College, Oxford.

== See also ==
- Royal West of England Academy
- Smoking in the United Kingdom

Parliament of the United Kingdom
Preceded by Henry Eaton; Henry Mather Jackson	Member of Parliament for Coventry; 1880–1885; With: Sir Henry Mather Jackson 1880–1881; Henry Eaton 1881–1885	Succeeded by Henry Eaton
Preceded by Sir Joseph Dodge Weston	Member of Parliament for Bristol East; 1895–1900	Succeeded by Charles Hobhouse
Peerage of the United Kingdom
New creation	Baron Winterstoke; 1906–1911	Extinct
Baronetage of the United Kingdom
New creation	Baronet (of Blagdon); 1893–1911	Extinct
Preceded by Knill baronets	Wills baronets of Blagdon; 12 August 1893	Succeeded by Cameron baronets
