= University of Birmingham =

Public research university in England

- Coat of arms
- Latin: Universitas Birminghamiensis
- Motto: Latin: Per Ardua ad Alta
- Motto in English: Through efforts to heights
- Type: Public
- Established: 1825 – Birmingham School of Medicine and Surgery; 1836 – Birmingham Royal School of Medicine and Surgery; 1843 – Queen's College; 1875 – Mason Science College; 1898 – Mason University College; 1900 – gained university status by royal charter
- Academic affiliations: ACU; EUA; Midlands Innovation; Russell Group; Universitas 21; Universities UK; Defence Universities Alliance
- Endowment: £153.7 million (2025)
- Budget: £1.072 billion (2024/25)
- Chancellor: Sandie Okoro
- Vice-Chancellor: Adam Tickell
- Visitor: The Rt Hon Alan Campbell MP (as Lord President of the Council ex officio)
- Academic staff: 4,865 (2024/25)
- Students: 40,025 (2024/25); 34,790 FTE (2024/25)
- Undergraduates: 25,530 (2024/25)
- Postgraduates: 14,500 (2024/25)
- Location: Birmingham, England; 52°27′2″N 1°55′50″W
- Campus: Urban, suburban
Colours
The University
College scarves
- College of Arts and Law
  College of Social Sciences
  College of Life and Environmental Sciences
  College of Engineering and Physical Sciences
  College of Medical and Dental Sciences
- Website: birmingham.ac.uk

The University of Birmingham (informally Birmingham University) is a public research university in Birmingham, England. It received its royal charter in 1900 as a successor to Queen's College, Birmingham (founded in 1825 as the Birmingham School of Medicine and Surgery), and Mason Science College (established in 1875 by Sir Josiah Mason), making it the first English redbrick university to receive its own royal charter, and the first English unitary university. It is a founding member of both the Russell Group of British research universities and the international network of research universities, Universitas 21.

The student population includes 25,530 undergraduate and 14,500 postgraduate students (2024/25), which is the 5th largest in the UK (out of 169). The annual income of the university for 2024–25 was £1.072 billion, of which £228.5 million was from research grants and contracts, with an expenditure of £1.068 billion. In the 2021 Research Excellence Framework, the University of Birmingham ranked equal 13th out of 129 institutions on grade point average, up from equal 31st in the previous REF in 2014.

The university is home to the Barber Institute of Fine Arts, housing works by Van Gogh, Picasso and Monet; the Shakespeare Institute; the Cadbury Research Library, the Mingana Collection of Middle Eastern manuscripts; the Lapworth Museum of Geology; and the 100-metre Joseph Chamberlain Memorial Clock Tower, which is a prominent landmark visible from many parts of the city. Academics and alumni of the university include former British Prime Ministers Neville Chamberlain and Stanley Baldwin, the British composer Sir Edward Elgar and eleven Nobel laureates.

== History ==
=== Queen's College ===
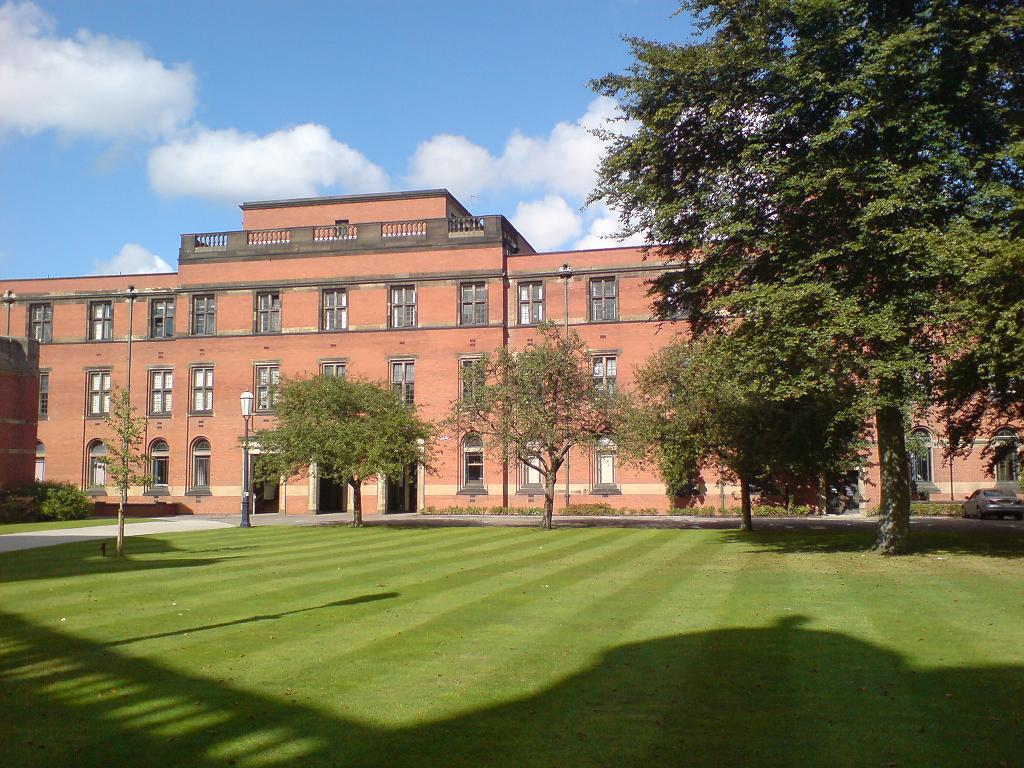
A view across Chancellor's Court, towards the Law building

The earliest beginnings of the university were originally traced back to the Queen's College, which is linked to William Sands Cox in his aim of creating a medical school along strictly Christian lines, unlike the contemporary London medical schools. Further research revealed the roots of the Birmingham Medical School in the medical education seminars of John Tomlinson, the first surgeon to the Birmingham Workhouse Infirmary, and later to the Birmingham General Hospital. These classes, held in the winter of 1767–68, were the first such lectures ever held in England or Wales. The first clinical teaching was undertaken by medical apprentices at the General Hospital, founded in 1779. The medical school, which grew out of the Birmingham Workhouse Infirmary was founded in 1828, but Cox began teaching in December 1825. Queen Victoria granted her patronage to the Clinical Hospital in Birmingham and allowed it to be styled "The Queen's Hospital". It was the first provincial teaching hospital in England. In 1843, the medical college became known as Queen's College.

=== Mason Science College ===
Ceiling of the Aston Webb building

In 1870, Sir Josiah Mason, the Birmingham industrialist and philanthropist, who made his fortune in making key rings, pens and pen nibs, and electroplating, drew up the Foundation Deed for Mason Science College. The college was founded in 1875. It was this institution that would eventually form the nucleus of the University of Birmingham. In 1882, the Departments of Chemistry, Botany and Physiology were transferred to Mason Science College, soon followed by the Departments of Physics and Comparative Anatomy. The transfer of the Medical School to Mason Science College gave considerable impetus to the growing importance of that college and in 1896 a move to incorporate it as a university college was made. As the result of the Mason University College Act 1897 (60 & 61 Vict. c. xx) it became incorporated as Mason University College on 1 January 1898, with Joseph Chamberlain becoming the President of its Court of Governors.

=== Royal charter ===
Birmingham University Act 1900
- Act of Parliament
- Parliament of the United Kingdom
- Long title: An Act to transfer all the property and liabilities of Mason University College in the city of Birmingham to the University of Birmingham and to repeal the Mason University College Act 1897 to confer certain powers on the said University and for other purposes.
- Citation: 63 & 64 Vict. c. xix
- Territorial extent: United Kingdom

Dates
- Royal assent: 25 May 1900
Other legislation
Repeals/revokes	Mason University College Act 1897
Amended by	Medical Act 1956

Status: Amended

It was largely owing to Chamberlain's enthusiasm that the university was granted a royal charter by Queen Victoria on 24 March 1900. The Calthorpe family offered twenty-five acres (10 hectares) of land on the Bournbrook side of their estate in July. The Court of Governors received the Birmingham University Act 1900 (63 & 64 Vict. c. xix), which put the royal charter into effect on 31 May.

The transfer of Mason University College to the new University of Birmingham, with Chamberlain as its first chancellor and Sir Oliver Lodge as the first principal, was complete. A remnant of Josiah Mason's legacy is the Mermaid from his coat-of-arms, which appears in the sinister chief of the university shield and of his college, the double-headed lion in the dexter.

The commerce faculty was founded by Sir William Ashley in 1901, who from 1902 until 1923 served as first Professor of Commerce and Dean of the Faculty. From 1905 to 1908, Edward Elgar held the position of Peyton Professor of Music at the university. He was succeeded by his friend Granville Bantock.

The university's own heritage archives are accessible for research through the university's Cadbury Research Library which is open to all interested researchers.

During the First World War, the Great Hall in the Aston Webb Building was requisitioned by the War Office to create the 1st Southern General Hospital, a facility for the Royal Army Medical Corps to treat military casualties; it was equipped with 520 beds and treated 125,000 injured servicemen.

In June 1921, the university appointed Linetta de Castelvecchio as Serena Professor of Italian: she was the first woman to hold a chair at the university and one of the first women professors in Great Britain.

=== Expansion ===
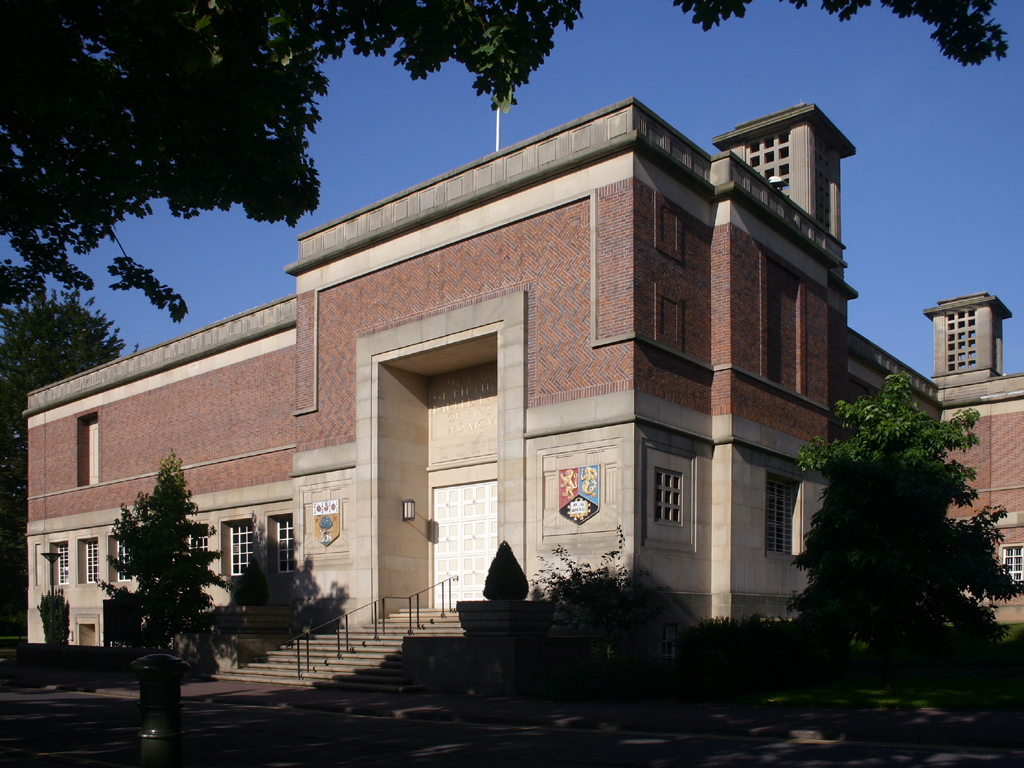
The Barber Institute of Fine Arts

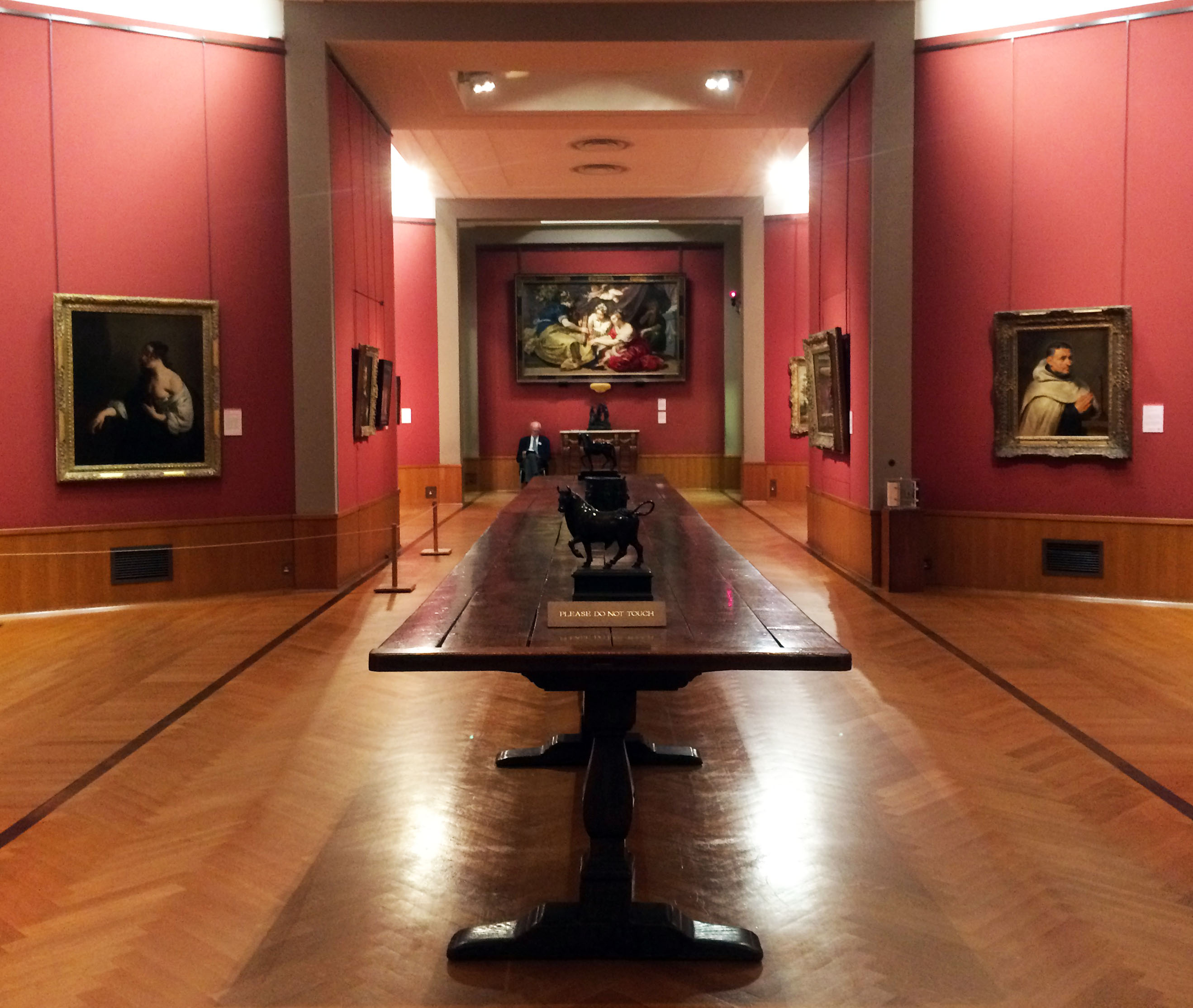
Barber Institute interior

In 1902, Birmingham University founded an Extension Lectures Committee. Following industrialisation, there was a growing need to bring the university closer to working-class organisations in the Midlands. The university collaborated with the Workers' Educational Association (WEA) Midlands section to develop a programme of social studies in the form of special evening lectures. By the 1920s, these classes had grown to become one of the university's main extra-mural activities. The university later established the Industrial Certificate Department, which offered education to workers and unionists as regular students, enabling them to work and study simultaneously.

In 1939, the Barber Institute of Fine Arts, designed by Robert Atkinson, was opened. In 1956, the first MSc programme in Geotechnical Engineering commenced under the title of "Foundation Engineering", and has been run annually at the university since.

Sir Raymond Priestley, vice-chancellor in 1938, helped establish the first undergraduate courses in Physical Education in 1946, developed their sports facilities – starting with the gymnasium in 1939, and made participation in recreational sport compulsory for all new undergraduates from 1940 to 1968. Birmingham became the first UK university to offer a sports degree.

The UK's longest-running MSc programme in Physics and Technology of Nuclear Reactors also started at the university in 1956, the same year that the world's first commercial nuclear power station was opened at Calder Hall in Cumbria.

In 1957, Sir Hugh Casson and Neville Conder were asked by the university to prepare a masterplan on the site of the original 1900 buildings, which were incomplete. The university drafted in other architects to amend the masterplan produced by the group. During the 1960s, the university constructed numerous large buildings, expanding the campus. In 1963, the university helped in the establishment of the faculty of medicine at the University of Rhodesia, now the University of Zimbabwe (UZ). UZ is now independent but both institutions maintain relations through student exchange programmes.

Birmingham also supported the creation of Keele University (formerly University College of North Staffordshire) and the University of Warwick under the Vice-Chancellorship of Sir Robert Aitken who acted as 'godfather' to the University of Warwick. The initial plan was to establish a satellite university college in Coventry but Aitken advised an independent initiative to the University Grants Committee.

Malcolm X, the Afro-American human rights activist, addressed the University Debating Society in 1965.

=== Scientific discoveries and inventions ===
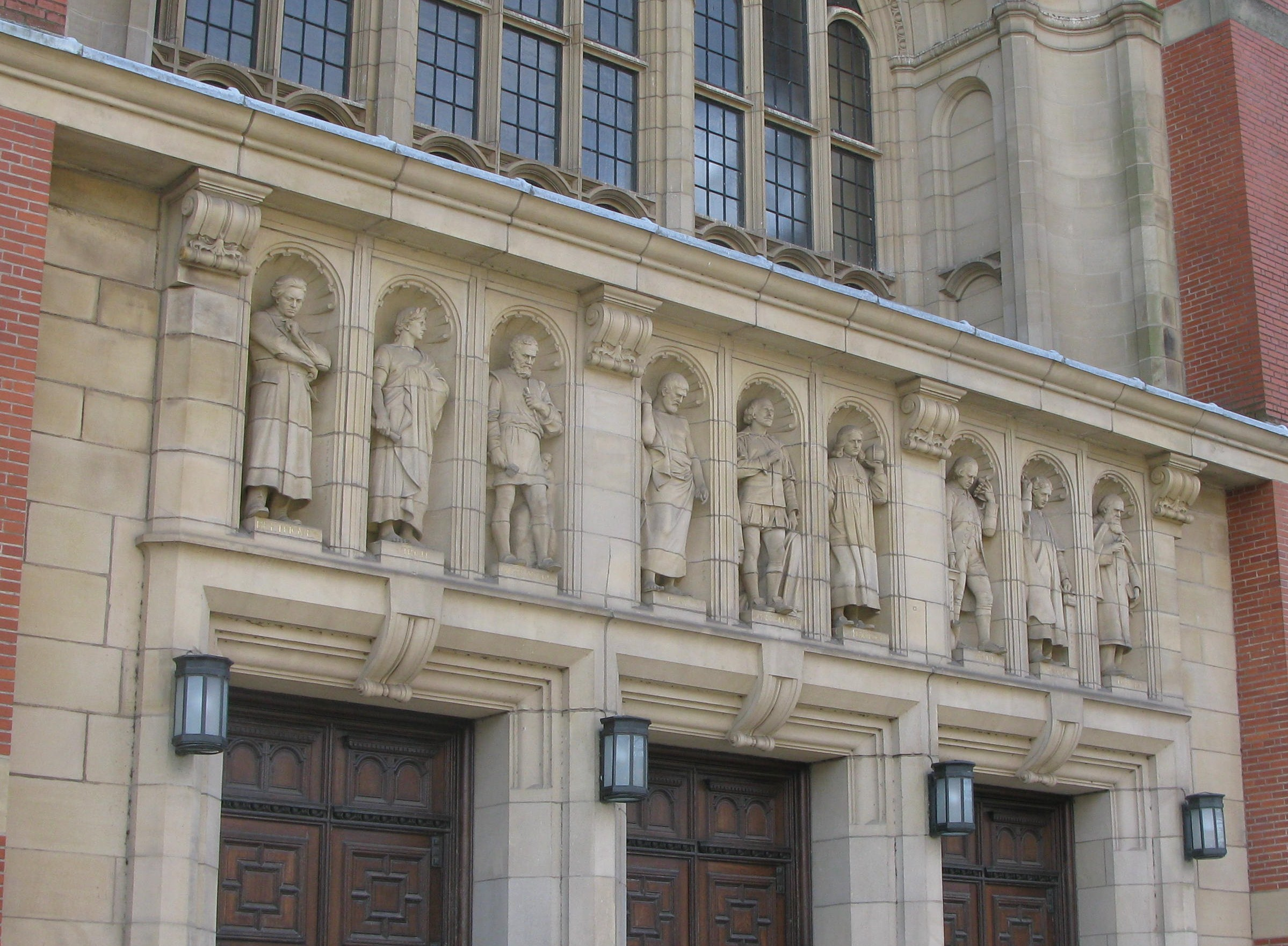
Statues of the University of Birmingham (Beethoven, Virgil, Michelangelo, Plato, Shakespeare, Newton, Watt, Faraday, and Darwin)

The university has been involved in many scientific breakthroughs and inventions. From 1925 until 1948, Sir Norman Haworth was Professor and Director of the Department of Chemistry. He was appointed Dean of the Faculty of Science and acted as Vice-Principal from 1947 until 1948. His research focused predominantly on carbohydrate chemistry in which he confirmed a number of structures of optically active sugars. By 1928, he had deduced and confirmed the structures of maltose, cellobiose, lactose, gentiobiose, melibiose, gentianose, raffinose, as well as the glucoside ring tautomeric structure of aldose sugars. His research helped to define the basic features of the starch, cellulose, glycogen, inulin and xylan molecules. He also contributed towards solving the problems with bacterial polysaccharides. He was a recipient of the Nobel Prize in Chemistry in 1937.

The cavity magnetron was developed in the Department of Physics by Sir John Randall, Harry Boot and James Sayers. This was vital to the Allied victory in World War II. In 1940, the Frisch–Peierls memorandum, a document which demonstrated that the atomic bomb was more than simply theoretically possible, was written in the Physics Department by Sir Rudolf Peierls and Otto Frisch. The university also hosted early work on gaseous diffusion in the Chemistry department when it was located in the Hills building.

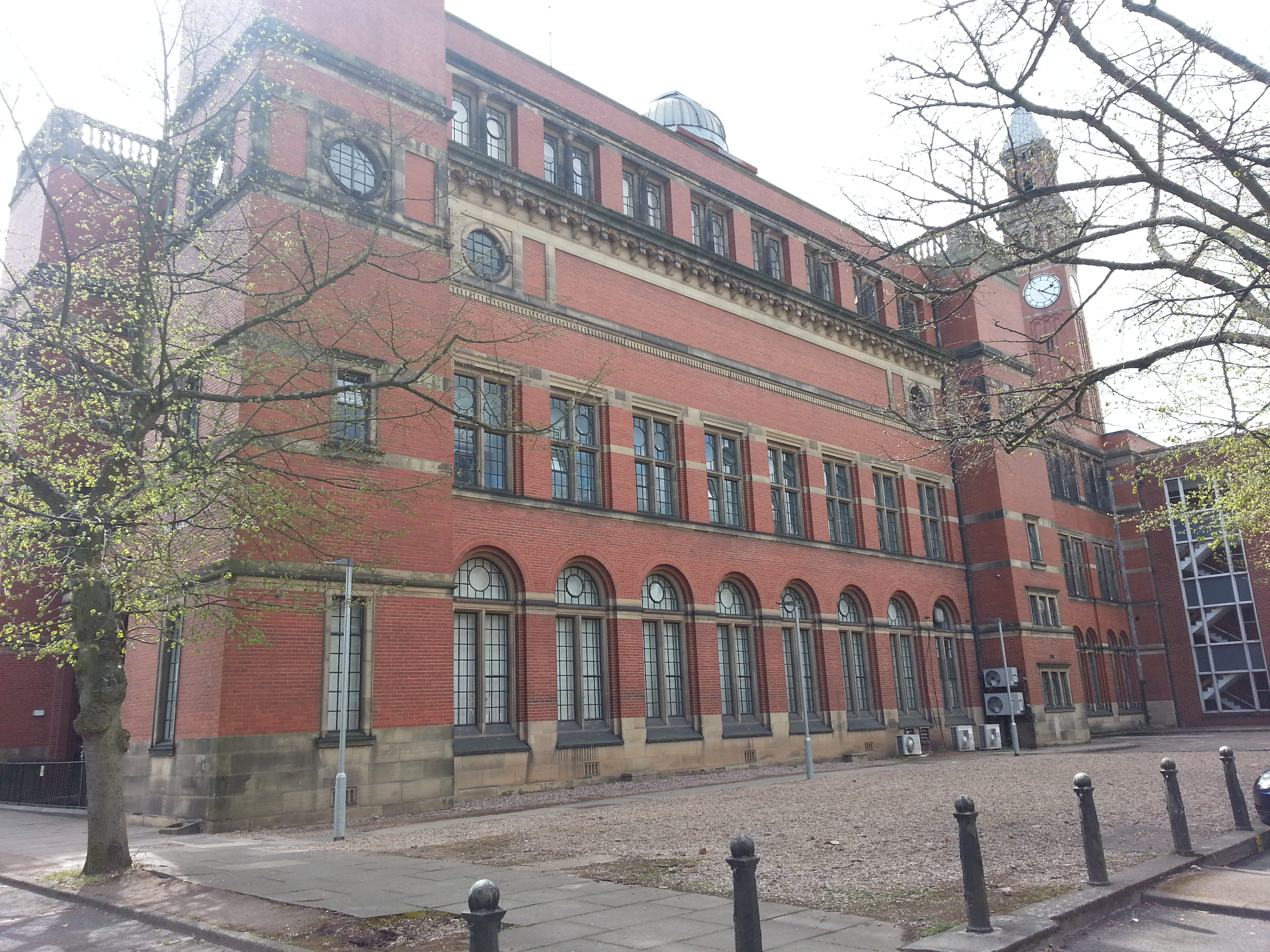
Poynting Physics building

Physicist Sir Mark Oliphant made a proposal for the construction of a proton-synchrotron in 1943; however, he made no assertion that the machine would work. In 1945, phase stability was discovered; consequently, the proposal was revived, and construction of a machine that could surpass proton energies of 1 GeV began at the university. However, because of lack of funds, the machine did not start until 1953. The Brookhaven National Laboratory managed to beat them; they started their Cosmotron in 1952, and had it entirely working in 1953, before the University of Birmingham.

In 1947, Sir Peter Medawar was appointed Mason Professor of Zoology at the university. His work involved investigating the phenomenon of tolerance and transplantation immunity. He collaborated with Rupert E. Billingham and they did research on problems of pigmentation and skin grafting in cattle. They used skin grafting to differentiate between monozygotic and dizygotic twins in cattle. Taking the earlier research of R. D. Owen into consideration, they concluded that actively acquired tolerance of homografts could be artificially reproduced. For this research, Medawar was elected a Fellow of the Royal Society. He left Birmingham in 1951 and joined the faculty at University College London, where he continued his research on transplantation immunity. He was a recipient of the Nobel Prize in Physiology or Medicine in 1960.

=== Recent history ===
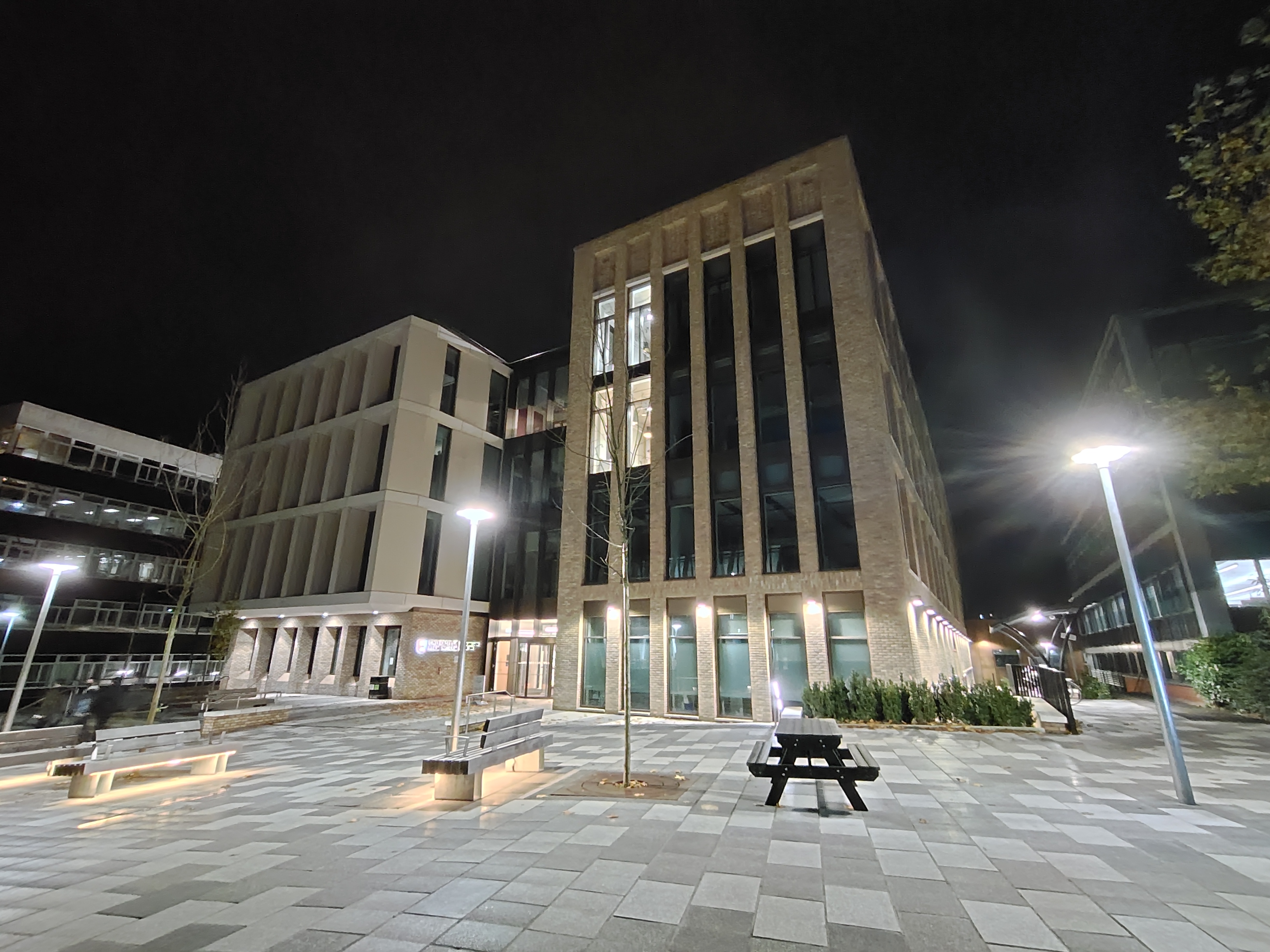
The construction of new school of Engineering was completed in 2021.

In 1999, talks commenced on the possibility of Aston University integrating itself into the University of Birmingham as the University of Birmingham, Aston Campus. This would have resulted in the University of Birmingham expanding to become one of the largest universities in the UK, with a student body of 30,000. Talks were halted in 2001 after Aston University determined the timing to be inopportune. While Aston University management was in favour of the integration, and reception among staff was generally positive, the Aston student union voted two-to-one against the integration. Despite this set back, the Vice Chancellor of the University of Birmingham said the door remained open to recommence talks when Aston University is ready.

The final round of the first ever televised leaders' debates, hosted by the BBC, was held at the university during the 2010 British general election campaign on 29 April 2010.

On 9 August 2010 the university announced that for the first time it would not enter the UCAS clearing process for 2010 admission, which matches under-subscribed courses to students who did not meet their firm or insurance choices, owing to all places being taken. Largely a result of the Great Recession, Birmingham joined fellow Russell Group universities including Oxford, Cambridge, Edinburgh and Bristol in not offering any clearing places.

The university acted as a training camp for the Jamaican athletics team prior to the 2012 London Olympics.

A new library was opened for the 2016/17 academic year, and a new sports centre opened in May 2017. The previous Main Library and the old Munrow Sports Centre, including the athletics track, have both since been demolished, with the demolition of the old library being completed in November 2017.

Birmingham was selected as the host for the 2022 Commonwealth Games and was the venue for hockey and squash, owing to the ability of existing facilities to host the games. The university was the largest athletes village during the games, hosting 3,500 athletes in Tennis Courts and the Vale, and was the official training venue for both swimming and athletics.

In November 2024, Sandie Okoro was installed as the University’s eighth Chancellor, becoming the first woman to hold the office. As ceremonial head of the university, her duties include organisation of degree ceremonies and representing and advocating the university.

In January 2026, the University launched a new facility at Tysley Energy Park. Designed for separating and recycling rare-earth magnets, the facility works on ways to reduce the UK's dependence on imports of rare-earth metals, alloys and magnets. The university's Magnetic Materials Group developed the Hydrogen Processing of Magnet Scrap (HPMS), which extracts rare-earth magnets from end-of-life products. The recovered matreials can then be processed into new alloys and magnets.

=== Controversies ===
The discipline of cultural studies was founded at the university and between 1964 and 2002 the campus was home to the Centre for Contemporary Cultural Studies, a research centre whose members' work came to be known as the Birmingham School of Cultural Studies. Despite being established by one of the key figures in the field, Richard Hoggart, and being later directed by the theorist Stuart Hall, the department was controversially closed down.

Analysis showed that the university was fourth in a list of British universities that faced the most employment tribunal claims between 2008 and 2011. They were the second most likely to settle these before the hearing date.

In 2011, a parliamentary early day motion was proposed, arguing against the Guild suspending the elected Sabbatical Vice President (Education), who was arrested while taking part in protest activity.

In December 2011, it was announced that the university had obtained a 12-month-long injunction against a group of around 25 students, who occupied a residential building on campus from 23 to 26 November 2011, preventing them from engaging in further "occupational protest action" on the university's grounds without prior permission. It was misreported in the press that this injunction applied to all students; the court order defines the defendants as,

Persons unknown (including students of the University of Birmingham) entering or remaining upon the buildings known as No. 2 Lodge Pritchatts Road, Birmingham at the University of Birmingham for the purpose of protest action (without the consent of the University of Birmingham).

The university and the Guild of Students also clarified the scope of the injunction in an e-mail sent to all students on 11 January 2012, stating that "The injunction applies to only those individuals who occupied the lodge". The university said that it sought this injunction as a safety precaution based on a previous occupation. Three human rights groups, including Amnesty International, condemned the move as restrictive on human rights.

In 2019, several women said the university refused to investigate allegations of campus rape. One student who complained of rape in university accommodation was told by employees of the university that there were no specific procedures for handling rape complaints. In other cases students were told they would have to prove the alleged rapes occurred on university property. The university has been criticized by legal professionals for not adequately assessing the risk to students by refusing to investigate complaints of criminal conduct.

In June 2022, the University published a report into, and apologised for, its involvement in developing, promoting and administering electric-shock conversion therapy to gay men, during the period 1966–1983.

In June 2024, the University of Birmingham initiated legal proceedings to remove a pro-Palestinian encampment from its campus, citing disruption to university activities, damage to buildings and spray-painting, and intimidation of staff. Lawyers representing a student opposing the proceedings described the protests as peaceful. On 9 July 2024, the High Court granted the university a possession order against the pro-Palestinian encampment, allowing it to be removed.

== Campuses ==
=== Edgbaston campus ===
==== Original buildings ====
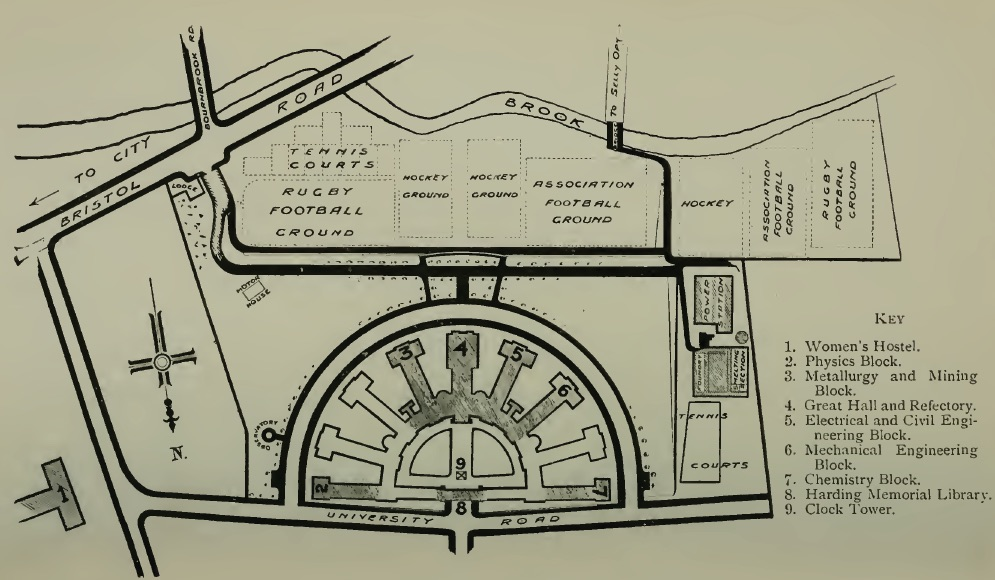
Plan of the new University Campus at Edgbaston, proposed by architects Sir Aston Webb and Mr Ingress Bell in 1909

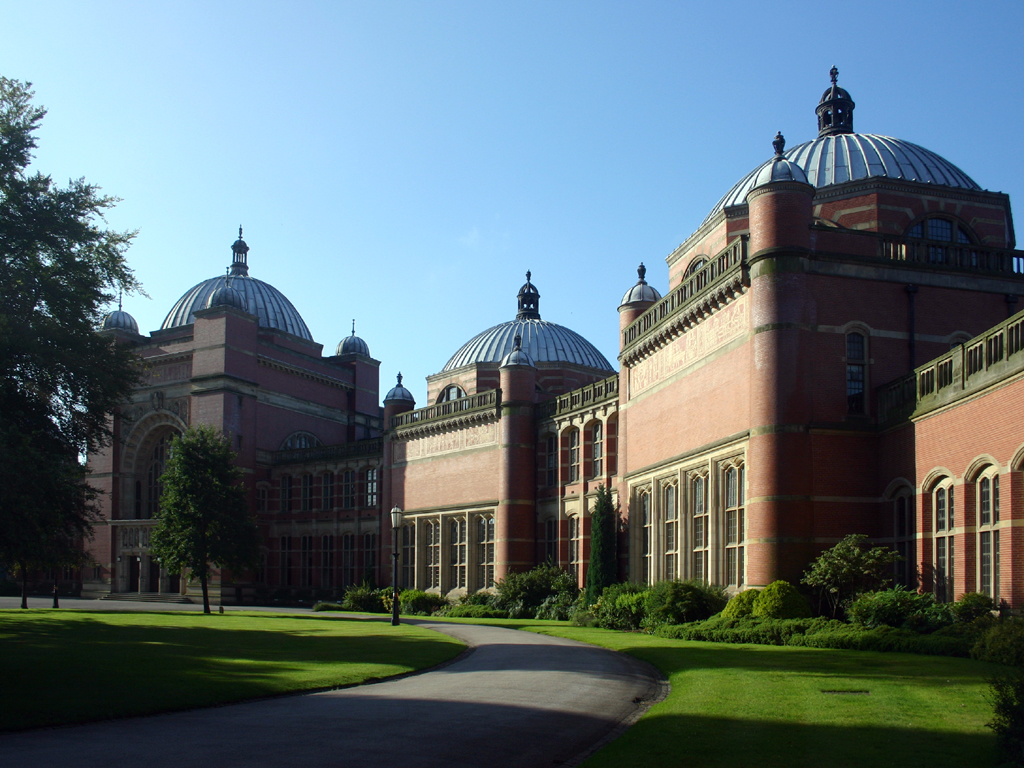
The Aston Webb Buildings, Chancellor's Court

The main campus of the university occupies a site some 3 miles (4.8 km) south-west of Birmingham city centre, in Edgbaston. It is arranged around Joseph Chamberlain Memorial Clock Tower (affectionately known as "Old Joe" or "Big Joe"), a grand campanile which commemorates the university's first chancellor, Joseph Chamberlain. Chamberlain may be considered the founder of the University of Birmingham, and was largely responsible for the university gaining its Royal Charter in 1900 and for the development of the Edgbaston campus. The university's Great Hall is located in the domed Aston Webb Building, which is named after one of the architects – the other was Ingress Bell. The initial 25-acre (100,000 m^{2}) site was given to the university in 1900 by Lord Calthorpe. The grand buildings were an outcome of the £50,000 given by steel magnate and philanthropist Andrew Carnegie to establish a "first class modern scientific college" on the model of Cornell University in the United States. Funding was also provided by Sir Charles Holcroft.

The original domed buildings, built in Accrington red brick, semicircle to form Chancellor's Court. This sits on a 30 feet (9.1 m) drop, so the architects placed their buildings on two tiers with a 16 feet (4.9 m) drop between them. The clock tower stands in the centre of the Court.

The campanile itself draws its inspiration from the Torre del Mangia, a medieval clock tower that forms part of the Town Hall in Siena, Italy. When it was built, it was described as 'the intellectual beacon of the Midlands' by the Birmingham Post. The clock tower was Birmingham's tallest building from the date of its construction in 1908 until 1969; it is now the third highest in the city. It is one of the top 50 tallest buildings in the UK, and the tallest free-standing clock tower in the world, although there is some confusion about its actual height, with the university listing it both as 110 metres (361 ft) and 325 feet (99 m) tall in different sources.

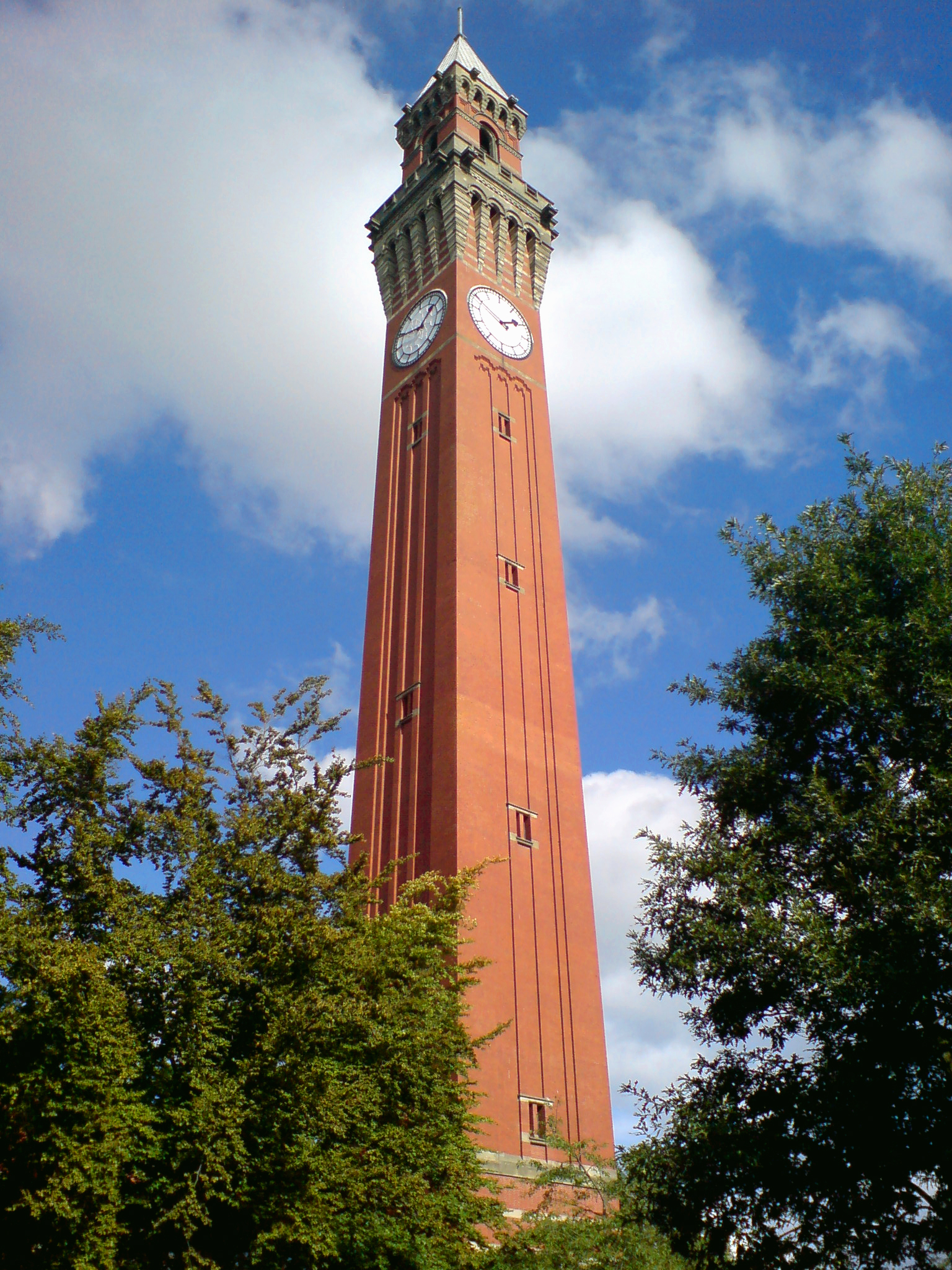
Old Joe, the university's clock tower, remains the tallest freestanding clock tower in the world.

The campus has a wide diversity in architectural types and architects. "What makes Birmingham so exceptional among the Red Brick universities is the deployment of so many other major Modernist practices: only Oxford and Cambridge boast greater selections". The Guild of Students original section was designed by Birmingham inter-war architect Holland Hobbiss who also designed the King Edward's School opposite. It was described as "Redbrick Tudorish" by Nikolaus Pevsner.

The statue on horseback fronting the entrance to the university and Barber Institute of Fine Arts is a 1722 statue of George I rescued from Dublin in 1937. This was saved by Bodkin, a director of the National Gallery of Ireland and first director of the Barber Institute. The statue was commissioned by the Dublin Corporation from the Flemish sculptor John van Nost.

Final negotiations for part of what is now the Vale were completed in only March 1947. By then, properties that would have their names used for halls of residences, such as Wyddrington and Maple Bank, were under discussion and more land was obtained from the Calthorpe estate in 1948 and 1949, providing the setting for the Vale. Landscape architect Mary Mitchell designed the layout of the campus and she included mature trees that were retained from the former gardens. Construction on the Vale started in 1962 with the creation of a 3-acre (12,000 m^{2}) artificial lake and the building of Ridge, High, Wyddrington and Lake Halls. The first, Ridge Hall, opened for 139 women in January 1964, with its counterpart High Hall admitting its first male residents the following October.

==== 1960s and modern expansion ====
The university's Learning Centre (left), School of Computer Science (right) and Sir Eduardo Paolozzi's Faraday sculpture

The university underwent a major expansion in the 1960s owing to the production of a masterplan by Casson, Conder and Partners. The first of the major buildings to be constructed to a design by the firm was the Refectory and Staff House, which was built in 1961 and 1962. The two buildings are connected by a bridge. The next major buildings to be constructed were the Wyddrington and Lake Halls and the Faculty of Commerce and Social Science, all completed in 1965.

In Winter 1968, students occupied the Great Hall during protests demonstrating for unity among faculty and students as well as democratisation of the university. The international political situation at that time was uncertain, casting doubt on the future of certain subjects, such as social studies. The occupation influenced internal changes within the Centre for Contemporary Cultural Studies (CCS), such as increased student participation and the inclusion of student voices in CCS meetings. In 2002, CCS was restructured and the programmes were split into other units. According to The Guardian this decision was met with mixed responses from staff and students.

The Faculty of Commerce and Social Science, now known as the Ashley Building, was designed by Howell, Killick, Partridge and Amis and is a long, curving two-storey block linked to a five-storey whorl. The two-storey block follows the curve of the road, and has load-bearing brick cross walls. It is faced in specially-made concrete blocks. The spiral is faced with faceted pre-cast concrete cladding panels. It was statutorily listed in 1993 and a refurbishment by Berman Guedes Stretton was completed in 2006.

Chamberlin, Powell and Bon were commissioned to design the Physical Education Centre, which was built in 1966. The main characteristic of the building is the roof of the changing rooms and small gymnasium, which has hyperbolic paraboloid roof light shells and is completely paved in quarry tiles. The roof of the sports hall consists of eight conoidal 2½-inch thick sprayed concrete shells springing from 80-foot (24 m) long pre-stressed valley beams. On the south elevation, the roof is supported on raking pre-cast columns and reversed shells form a cantilevered canopy.

Also completed in 1966 was the Mining and Minerals Engineering and Physical Metallurgy Departments, which was designed by Philip Dowson of Arup Associates. This complex consisted of four similar three-storey blocks linked at the corners. The frame is of pre-cast reinforced concrete with columns in groups of four and the whole is planned as a tartan grid, allowing services to be carried vertically and horizontally so that at no point in a room are services more than ten feet away. The building received the 1966 RIBA Architecture Award for the West Midlands. It was statutorily listed in 1993. Taking the full five years from 1962 to 1967, Birmingham erected twelve buildings, which each cost in excess of a quarter of a million pounds.

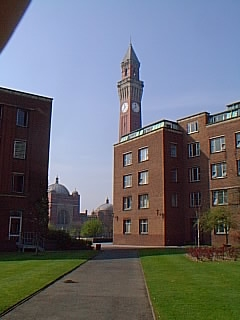
Faculty of Arts Building

In 1967, Lucas House, a new hall of residence designed by The John Madin Design Group, was completed, providing 150 study bedrooms. It was constructed in the garden of a large house. The Medical School was extended in 1967 to a design by Leonard J. Multon and Partners. The two-storey building was part of a complex that covers the southside of Metchley Fort, a Roman fort. In 1968, the Institute for Education in the Department for Education was opened. This was another Casson, Conder and Partners-designed building. The complex consisted of a group of buildings centred around an eight-storey block, containing study offices, laboratories and teaching rooms. The building has a reinforced concrete frame that is exposed internally, and the external walls are of silver-grey rustic bricks. The roofs of the lecture halls, penthouse and Child Study wing are covered in copper.

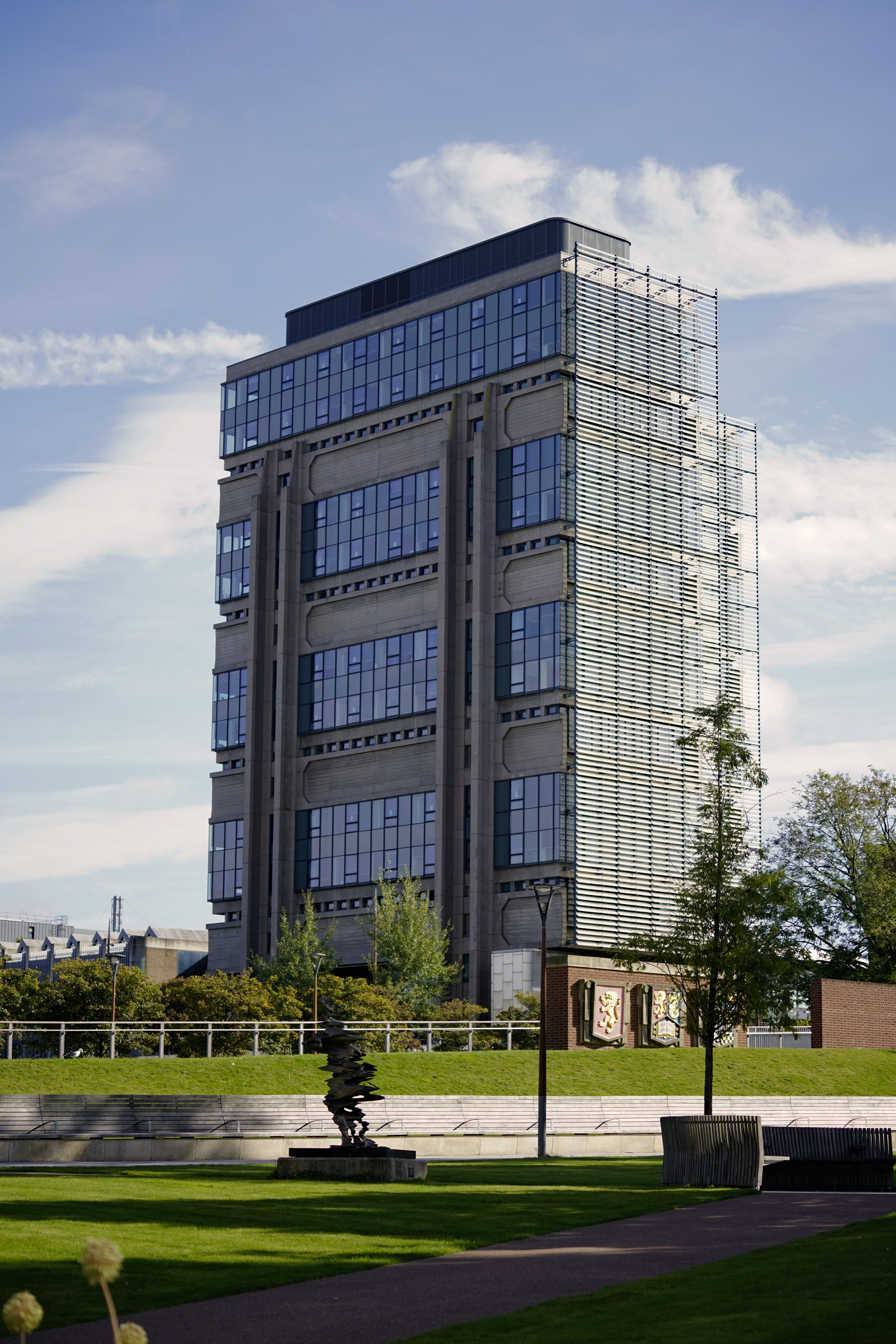
Muirhead tower, as viewed from near The Bratby Bar

Arup Associates returned in the 1960s to design the Arts and Commerce Building, better known as Muirhead Tower and houses the Institute of Local Government Studies. This was completed in 1969. A£42 million refurbishment of the 16-storey tower was completed in 2009 and it now houses the Colleges of Social Sciences and the Cadbury Research Library, the new home for the university's Special Collections. The podium was remodeled around the existing Allardyce Nicol studio theatre, providing additional rehearsal spaces and changing and technical facilities. The ground floor lobby now incorporates a Starbucks coffee shop. The name, Muirhead Tower, came from that of the first philosophy professor of the university John Henry Muirhead.

Completed in 2012, the Bramall Music Building is a 450-seat concert hall, which completes the redbrick semicircle of the Aston Webb building, designed by Glenn Howells Architects with venue design by Acoustic Dimensions. This auditorium, with its associated research, teaching and rehearsal facilities, houses the Department of Music.

In August 2011 the university announced a £175 million investment in transforming the campus, including a flagship new library and indoor sports centre. The new main library was constructed on a site adjacent to the old library, which was demolished and replaced by the 'Green Heart' open space. This demolition restored an iconic 1930s sightline from the North Gate to the clock tower. The sports centre was developed by architects Lifschutz Davidson Sandilands and S&P, and opened in 2017. Its membership is open to the general public.

The Teaching and Learning building, a subject-agnostic building providing new state-of-the-art lecture theatres and seminar rooms, was constructed on the plot immediately north of the new library and opened in January 2020.

The Molecular Sciences Building, which was completed in October 2023, opened in October 2024 as a base for environmental, chemical and biomedical sciences. The hub offers laboratory spaces for over 500 scientists from a variety of disciplines. Research conducted at the facility includes the development of materials for use in energy applications and healthcare, the creation of recyclable plastics, the environmental impact of drugs on ecosystems, as well as the environmental effects of critical materials such as lithium.

==== Railway station ====
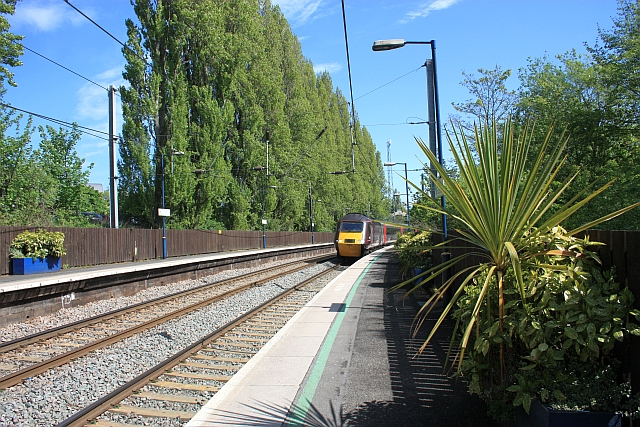
University railway station

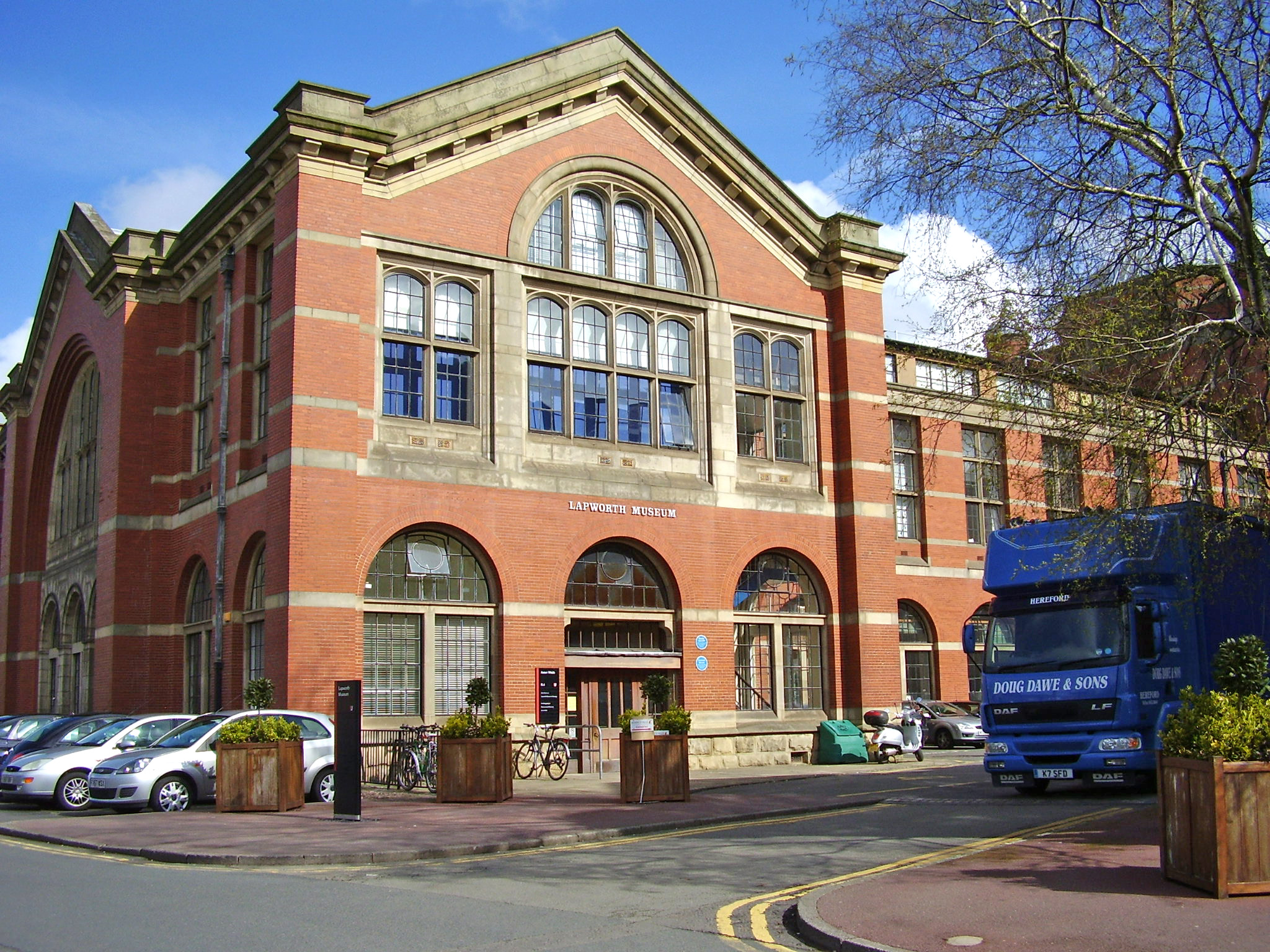
Lapworth Museum of Geology

In 1978, University station, on the Cross-City Line, was opened to serve the university and its hospital. It is the only university campus in mainland Britain with its own railway station. In 2021, construction began on a redeveloped facility adjacent to the existing structure as part of the West Midlands Rail Programme (WMRP). The rebuilt station was completed and opened to the public in January 2024. Nearby, the Steampipe Bridge, which was constructed in 2011, transports steam across the Cross-City Railway Line and Worcester & Birmingham Canal from the energy generation plant to the medical school as part of the university's sustainable energy strategy. Its laser-cut exterior is also a public art feature.

==== Other features ====
Located within the Edgbaston site of the university is the Winterbourne Botanic Garden, a 24,000-square-metre (258,000 square foot) Edwardian Arts and Crafts-style garden. The large statue in the foreground was a gift to the university by its sculptor Sir Edward Paolozzi – the sculpture is named "Faraday", and has an excerpt from the poem The Dry Salvages by T. S. Eliot around its base.

The University of Birmingham operates the Lapworth Museum of Geology in the Aston Webb Building in Edgbaston. It was founded 1880 and is named after Charles Lapworth, a geologist who worked at Mason Science College.

Since November 2007, the university has been holding a farmers' market on the campus. Birmingham is the first university in the country to have an accredited farmers' market.

The considerable extent of the estate meant that by the end of the 1990s it was valued at £536 million.

University of Birmingham marked its grand ending of Green Heart Project at the start of 2019.

In 2021, the University opened a central-city meeting and conference site called The Exchange in the former Birmingham Municipal Bank in Centenary Square.

No.1 Birmingham Health Innovation Campus, which provides 133,000 square feet of laboratory and office space for fields like health and life sciences, as well as research and innovation. The campus launched in Selly Oak in 2025. The £40 million construction project was led by Bruntwood SciTech.

In 2026, the UK Government's Department for Science, Innovation and Technology announced funding from the Life Sciences Innovative Manufacturing Fund (LSIMF) to build three dedicated commercial cleanrooms at the Precision Health Technologies Accelerator.

The same year, construction on the 657,000 square feet (61,000 m^{2}) Birmingham Centre for Anatomy, Surgical and Clinical Skills (BCASCS) began. The new facility is an addition to the Birmingham health Innovation Campus is designed to offer students state of-the-art enviroenments, including mock hospital wards, simulated operating theatres, a mortuary and an embalming room. Galliford Try is leading the £21 million project, which comprises a master plan of six phases.

=== Selly Oak campus ===
The university's Selly Oak campus is a short distance to the south of the main campus. It was the home of a federation of nine colleges, known as Selly Oak Colleges, mainly focused on theology, social work, and teacher training. The Federation was for many years associated with the University of Birmingham. A new library, the Orchard Learning Resource Centre, was opened in 2001, shortly before the Federation ceased to exist. The OLRC is now one of the University of Birmingham's site libraries. Among the Selly Oak Colleges was Westhill College, (later the University of Birmingham, Westhill), which merged with the university's School of Education in 2001. In the following years most of the remaining colleges closed, leaving two colleges which continue today, Woodbrooke College, a study and conference centre for the Society of Friends, and Fircroft College, a small adult education college with residential provision. Woodbrooke College's Centre for Postgraduate Quaker Studies, established in 1998, works with the University of Birmingham to deliver research supervision for the degrees of MA by research and PhD.

The Selly Oak campus is now home to the Department of Drama and Theatre Arts in the newly refurbished Selly Oak Colleges Old Library and George Cadbury Hall 200-seat theatre. The UK daytime television show Doctors is filmed on this campus. The University of Birmingham School occupies a brand new, purpose-built building located on the university's Selly Oak campus. The University of Birmingham School is sponsored by the University of Birmingham and managed by an Academy Trust. The University of Birmingham School opened in September 2015.

=== Mason College and Queen's College campus ===
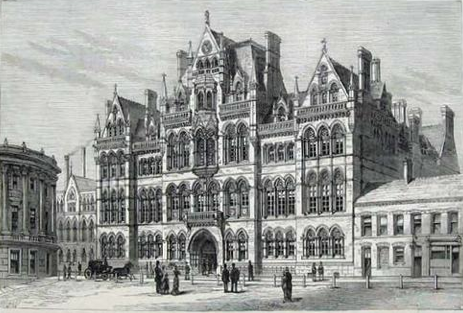
The Mason College building housed the Faculties of Arts and Law until 1962 (picture date: 1880)

The Victorian neo-gothic Mason College Building in Birmingham city centre housed the University of Birmingham's Faculties of Arts and Law for more than 50 years after the founding of the university in 1900. The Faculty of Arts building on the Edgbaston campus was not constructed until 1959–61. The Faculties of Arts and Law then moved to the Edgbaston campus. The original Mason College Building was demolished in 1962 as part of the redevelopment within the inner ring road.

The 1843 Gothic Revival building constructed opposite the Town Hall between Paradise Street (the main entrance) and Swallow Street served as Queen's College, one of the founder colleges of the university. In 1904 the building was given a new buff-coloured terracotta and brick front. The medical and scientific departments merged with Mason College in 1900 to form the University of Birmingham and sought new premises in Edgbaston. The theological department of Queen's College did not merge with Mason College, but later moved in 1923 to Somerset Road in Edgbaston, next to the University of Birmingham as the Queen's Foundation, maintaining a relationship with the University of Birmingham until a 2010 review. In the mid 1970s, the original Queen's College building was demolished, with the exception of the grade II listed façade.

=== Dubai Campus ===
University of Birmingham Dubai Entrance in DIAC

The University of Birmingham announced the opening of its Dubai campus in May 2017 at Dubai International Academic City (DIAC), welcoming its first students in September 2018. They have since moved from the DIAC headquarters with the construction of a purpose built campus opened in 2022 inaugurated by the Dubai Crown Prince Sheikh Hamdan Bin Mohammed Al Maktoum. The campus is led by a Dubai based Provost. In January 2024 Professor Yusra Mouzughi was appointed as the fourth individual to hold this position

Students and staff represent over 100 different nationalities, fostering a diverse and international community. Students have the opportunity to apply for a temporary exchange at the university's Edgbaston campus in the UK, as long as they are enrolled in eligible programmes.The ambition for the campus is to host around 3,000 students. The university welcomes flying faculty from the Edgbaston Campus for various programmes.

The campus is licensed by the Commission for Academic Accreditation within the United Arab Emirates' higher education system. The Commission also accredits the campus's individual programmes.

== Organisation and administration ==
=== Academic departments ===
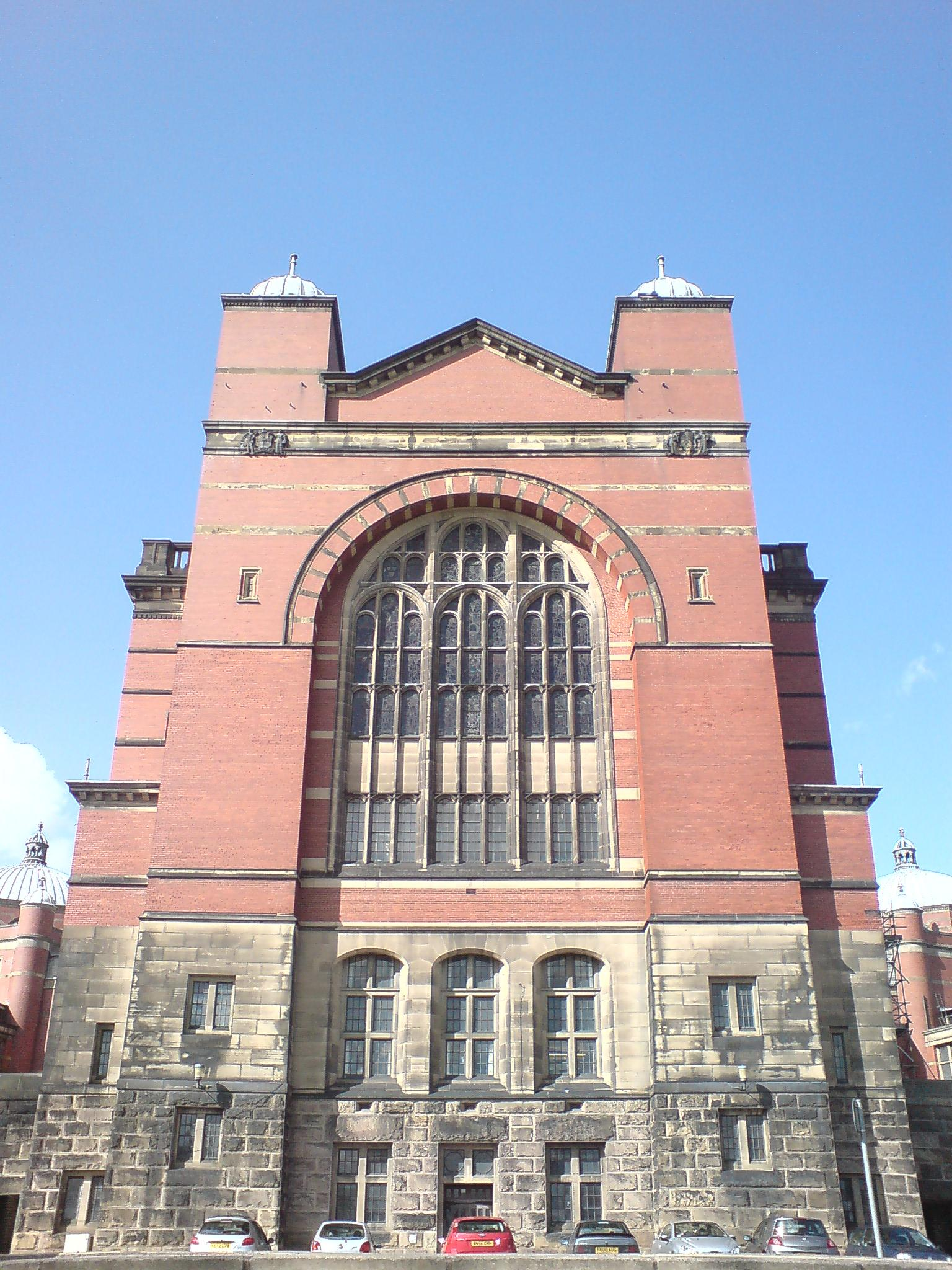
Stained glass window in the Great Hall

Birmingham has departments covering a wide range of subjects. On 1 August 2008, the university's system was restructured into five 'colleges', which are composed of numerous 'schools':

- Arts and Law (English, Drama and Creative Studies; History and Cultures; Languages, Cultures, Art History and Music; Liberal Arts, Birmingham Law School; Philosophy, Theology and Religion)
- Engineering and Physical Sciences (Chemistry; Chemical Engineering; Computer Science; Engineering (comprising the Departments of civil, Mechanical and Electrical, Electronic & Systems Engineering); Mathematics; Metallurgy and Materials; Physics and Astronomy)
- Life and Environmental Sciences (Biosciences; Geography, Earth and Environmental Sciences; Psychology; Sport and Exercise Sciences)
- Medicine and Health (Institute of Cancer and Genomic Sciences; Institute of Clinical Sciences; Institute of Inflammation and Ageing; Institute of Applied Health Research; Institute of Cardiovascular Science; Institute of Immunology and Immunotherapy; Institute of Metabolism and Systems Research; Institute of Microbiology and Infection).
- Social Sciences (Birmingham Business School; Education; Government and Society; Social Policy)

The university is home to a number of research centres and schools, including the Birmingham Business School, the oldest business school in England, the University of Birmingham Medical School, the International Development Department, the Institute of Local Government Studies, the Centre of West African Studies, the Centre for Russian and East European Studies, the Centre of Excellence for Research in Computational Intelligence and Applications and the Shakespeare Institute. The Third Sector Research Centre was established in 2008, and the Institute for Research into Superdiversity was established in 2013. Apart from traditional research and PhDs, under the department of Engineering and Physical Sciences, the university offers split-site PhD in Computer Science. The university is also home to the Birmingham Solar Oscillations Network (BiSON) which consists of a network of six remote solar observatories monitoring low-degree solar oscillation modes. It is operated by the High Resolution Optical Spectroscopy group of the School of Physics and Astronomy, funded by the Science and Technology Facilities Council (STFC).

The university also offer programmes through the Birmingham International Academy (BIA), which supports students with integrated foundation years and Presessional English courses to prepare for university study.

Following the Covid-19 pandemic, the university developed new methods to improve the delivery of its education and decided to move away from the former semester system, subsequently reverting to a three-term academic calendar. From the 2025–2026 academic year, they also introduced Ad Alta, which is a university-wide undergraduate skills programme. Developed with input from employers and graduate alumni, the programme is dedicated to improving students' ability to meet future career requirements.

In 2025, the University Doctoral School (UDS) was established to provide university-wide support for doctoral researchers in the form of training and development opportunities. The UDS was developed from the former University Graduate School and is led by Professor Jessica Blair.

The university also runs transnational education programmes in China. In 2025, the first students enrolled on the HUST–Birmingham dual-degree programme in biomedical sciences and pharmacy. The following year, the Jinan University–University of Birmingham Joint Institute added postgraduate programmes to its portfolio.

==== International Development Department ====
The International Development Department (IDD) is a multi-disciplinary academic department focused on poverty reduction through developing effective governance systems. The department is one of the leading UK centres for the postgraduate study of international development. The department has been described as being a "highly regarded, long-established specialist unit" with a "global reputation" by The Independent.

=== Off-campus establishments ===
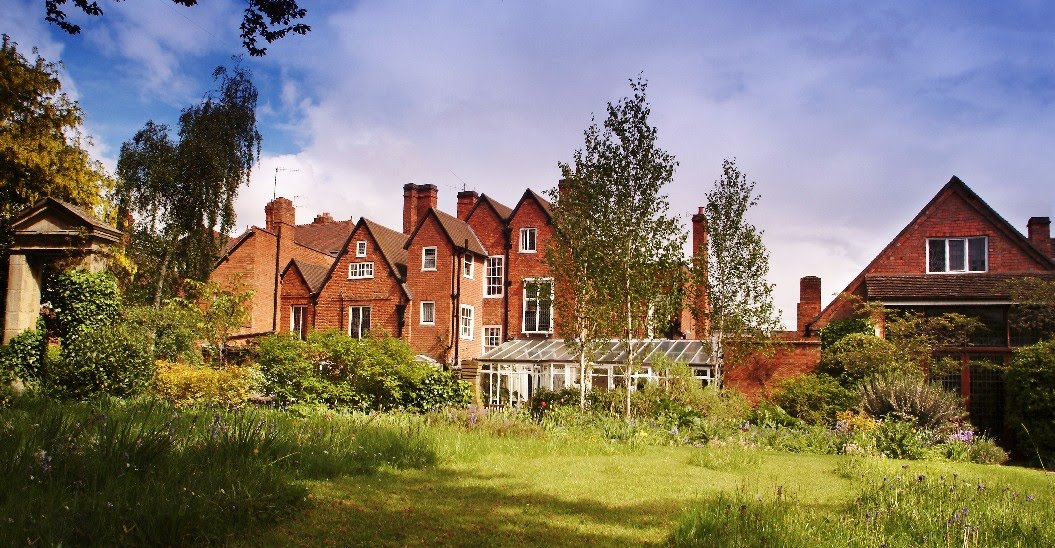
The Shakespeare Institute, Stratford-upon-Avon

A number of the university's centres, schools and institutes are located away from its two campuses in Edgbaston and Selly Oak:

- The Shakespeare Institute, in Stratford-upon-Avon, which is a centre for postgraduate study dedicated to the study of William Shakespeare and the literature of the English Renaissance.
- The Ironbridge Institute, in Ironbridge, which offers postgraduate and professional development courses in heritage.
- The School of Dentistry (the UK's oldest dental school), in Birmingham City Centre.
- The Raymond Priestley Centre, near Coniston in the Lake District, which is used for outdoor pursuits and field work.

There is also a Masonic Lodge that has been associated with the university since 1938.

==== University of Birmingham Observatory ====
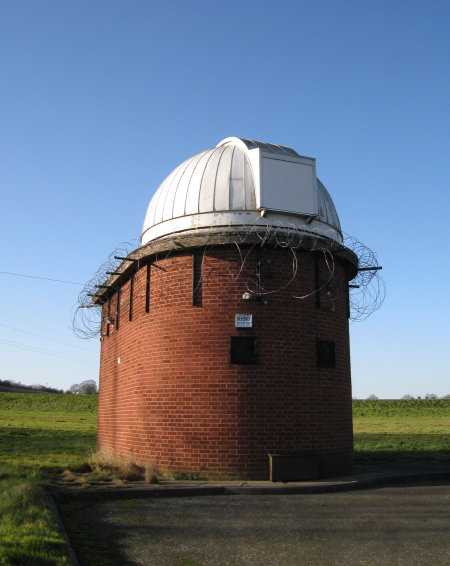
The University of Birmingham Astronomical Observatory

In the early 1980s, the University of Birmingham constructed an observatory next to the university playing fields, approximately 5 miles (8.0 km) south of the Edgbaston campus. The site was chosen because the night sky was ~100 times darker than the skies above campus. First light was on 8 December 1982, and the Observatory was officially opened by the Astronomer Royal, Francis Graham-Smith, on 13 June 1984. The observatory was upgraded in 2013.

The Observatory is used primarily for undergraduate teaching. It has two main instruments, a 16" Cassegrain (working at f/19) and a 14" Meade LX200R (working at f/6.35). A third telescope is also present and is used exclusively for visual observations.

Members of the public are given chance to visit the Observatory at regular Astronomy in the City events during the winter months. These events include a talk on the night sky from a member of the university's student Astronomical Society; a talk on current astrophysics research, such as exoplanets, galaxy clusters or gravitational-wave astronomy, a question-and-answer session, and the chance to observing using telescopes both on campus and at the Observatory.

=== Finances ===
In the financial year ending 31 July 2024, Birmingham had a total income of £926 million (2022/23 – £909.1 million) and total expenditure of £726.5 million (2022/23 – £884.7 million). Key sources of income included £456.3 million from tuition fees and education contracts (2022/23 – £445.1 million), £109.5 million from funding body grants (2022/23 – £112.9 million), £205.2 million from research grants and contracts (2022/23 – £196.7 million), £13.4 million from investment income (2022/23 – £9.8 million) and £9.3 million from donations and endowments (2022/23 – £9.6 million).

At year end, Birmingham had endowments of £155.8 million (2022/23 – £142.5 million) and total net assets of £1.310 billion (2022/23 – £1.106 billion). It holds the eleventh-largest endowment of any university in the UK.

=== Branding ===
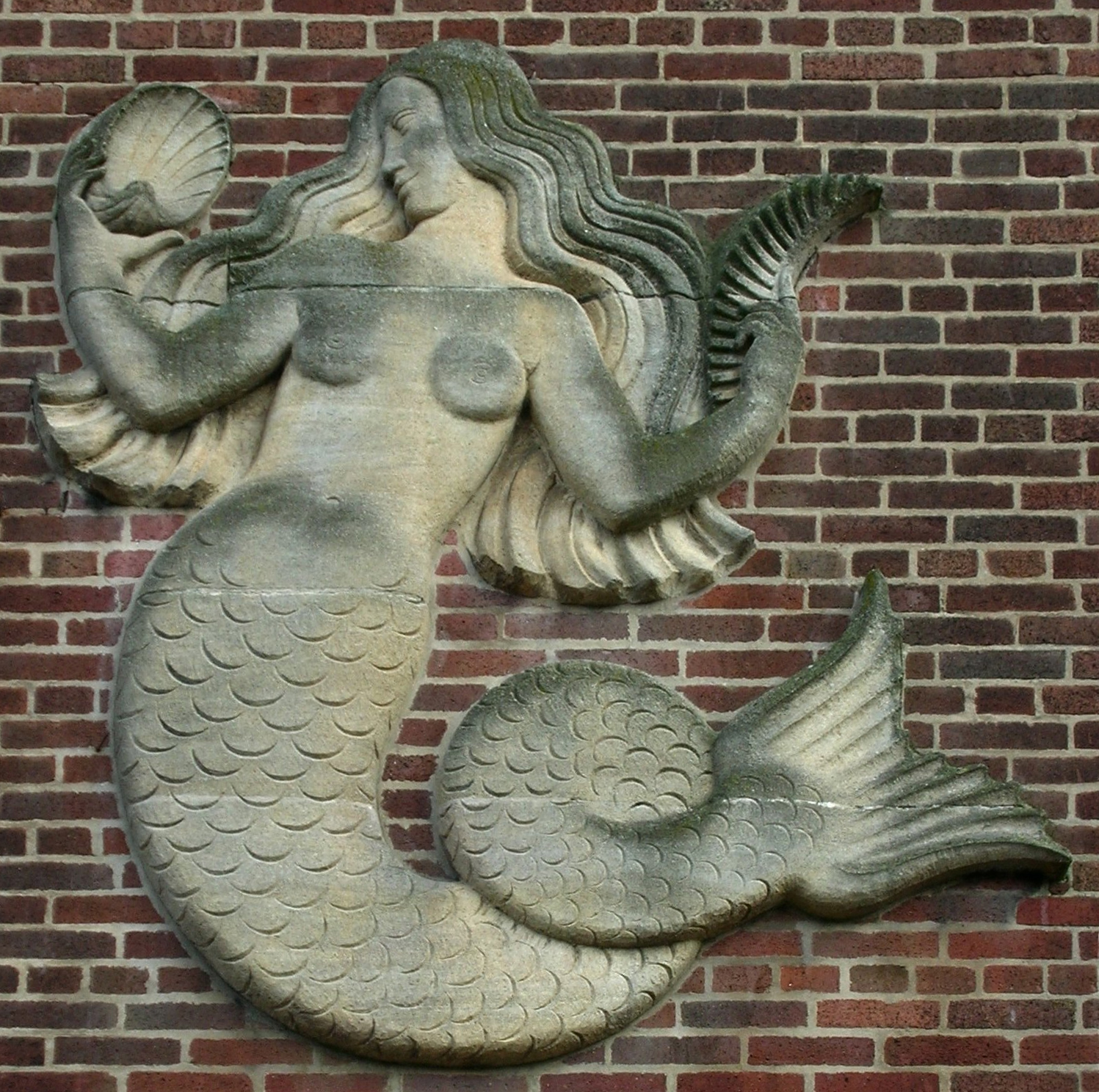
William Bloye's University of Birmingham mermaid

The original coat of arms was designed in 1900. It features a double headed lion (on the left) and a mermaid holding a mirror and comb (to the right). These symbols owe to the coat of arms of the institution's predecessor, Mason College.

In 2005 the university began rebranding itself. A simplified edition of the shield which had been introduced in the 1980s reverted to a detailed version based on how it appears on the university's original Royal Charter.

== Academic profile ==
=== Libraries and collections ===
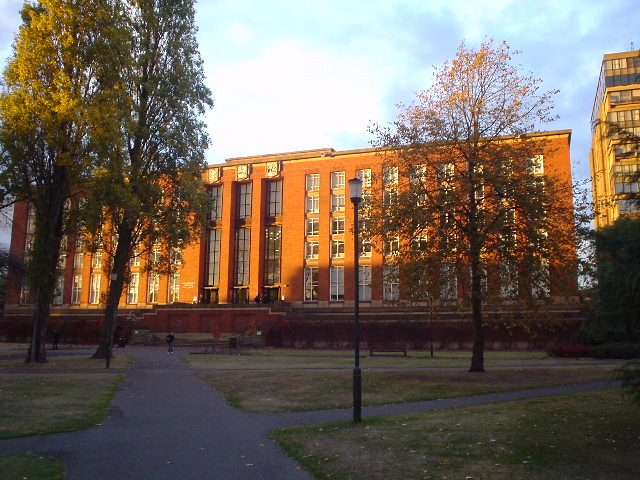
The old main library, which has now been demolished

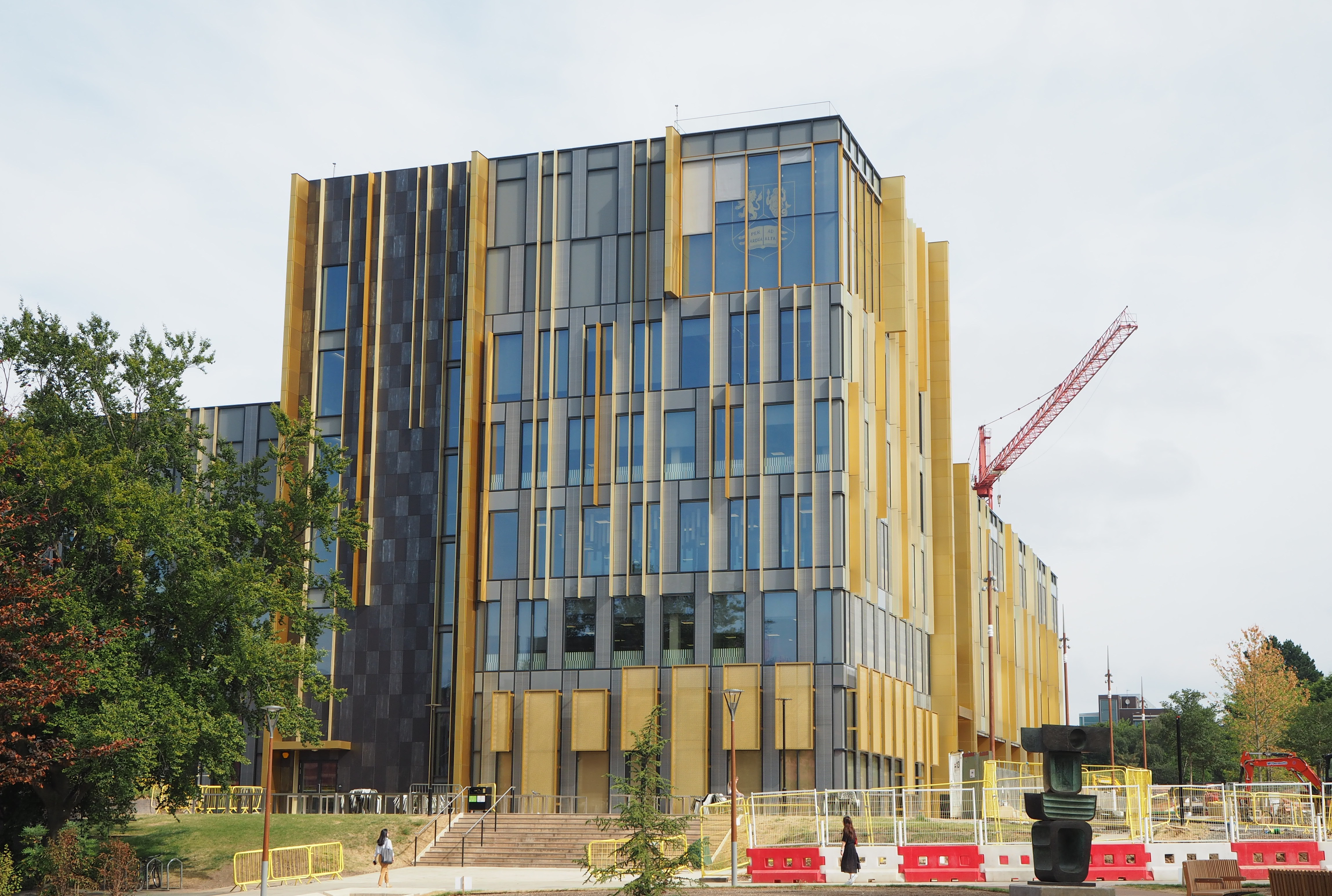
The Main Library opened in 2016

Library Services operates six libraries. They are the Barber Fine Art Library, Barnes Library, Main Library, Orchard Learning Resource Centre, Dental Library, and the Shakespeare Institute Library. Library Services also operates the Cadbury Research Library.

The Shakespeare Institute's library is a major United Kingdom resource for the study of English Renaissance literature.

The Cadbury Research Library is home to the University of Birmingham's historic collections of rare books, manuscripts, archives, photographs and associated artefacts. The collections, which have been built up over a period of 120 years consist of more than 200,000 rare printed books including significant incunabula, as well as more than 4 million unique archive and manuscript collections. The Cadbury Research Library is responsible for directly supporting the university's research, learning and teaching agenda, along with supporting the national and international research community.

The Cadbury Research Library contains the Chamberlain collection of papers from Neville Chamberlain, Joseph Chamberlain and Austen Chamberlain, the Avon Papers belonging to Anthony Eden with material on the Suez Crisis, the Cadbury Papers relating to the Cadbury firm from 1900 to 1960, the Mingana Collection of Middle Eastern Manuscripts of Alphonse Mingana, the Noël Coward Collection, the papers of Edward Elgar, Oswald Mosley, Allardyce Nicoll and David Lodge, and the records of the English YMCA and of the Church Missionary Society. The Cadbury Research Library has recently taken in the complete archive of UK Save the Children. The Library holds important first editions such as De Humani Corporis (1543) by Versalius, the Complete Works (1616) of Ben Jonson, two copies of The Temple of Flora (1799-1807) by Robert Thornton and comprehensive collections of the works of Joseph Priestley and D H Lawrence as well as many other significant works.

In 2015, a Quranic manuscript in the Mingana Collection was identified as one of the oldest to have survived, having been written between 568 and 645.

At the beginning of the 2016/17 academic year, a new main library opened on the Edgbaston campus and the old library has now been demolished as part of the plans to create a 'Green Heart' as per the original plans for the university whereby the clock tower would be visible from the North Gate. The Harding Law Library was closed and renovated to become the university's Translation and Interpreting Suite.

=== Medicine ===
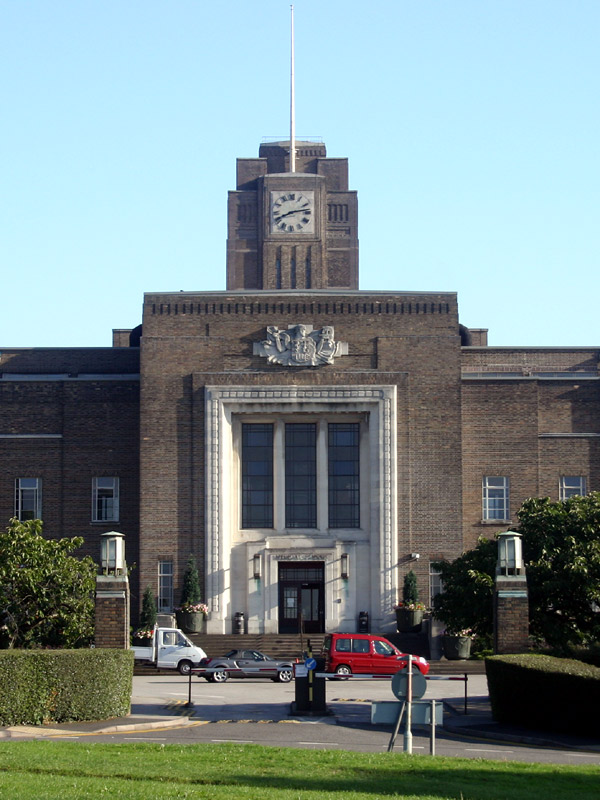
The Medical School

The University of Birmingham's medical school is one of the largest in Europe with more than 350 medical students being trained in each clinical year and more than 1,000 teaching, research, technical and administrative staff. The school has centres of excellence in cancer, pharmacy, immunology, cardiovascular disease, neuroscience and endocrinology, and is known internationally for its research and developments in these fields. The medical school has close links with the NHS and works closely with 15 teaching hospitals and 50 primary care training practices in the West Midlands. At the end of the course, students receve the MBChB. This degree is a primary medical qualification whose graduates are eligible for provisional registration with the General Medical Council (GMC) if they meet the fitnes-to-practise requirements.

The University Hospital Birmingham NHS Foundation Trust is the main teaching hospital in the West Midlands. It has been given three stars for the past four years.

=== Rankings and reputation ===
Rankings
National rankings
- Complete (2027): 12
- Guardian (2027): 14
- Times / Sunday Times (2027): 12

Global rankings
- ARWU (2026): 101–150
- QS (2027): 68=
- THE (2026): 98=

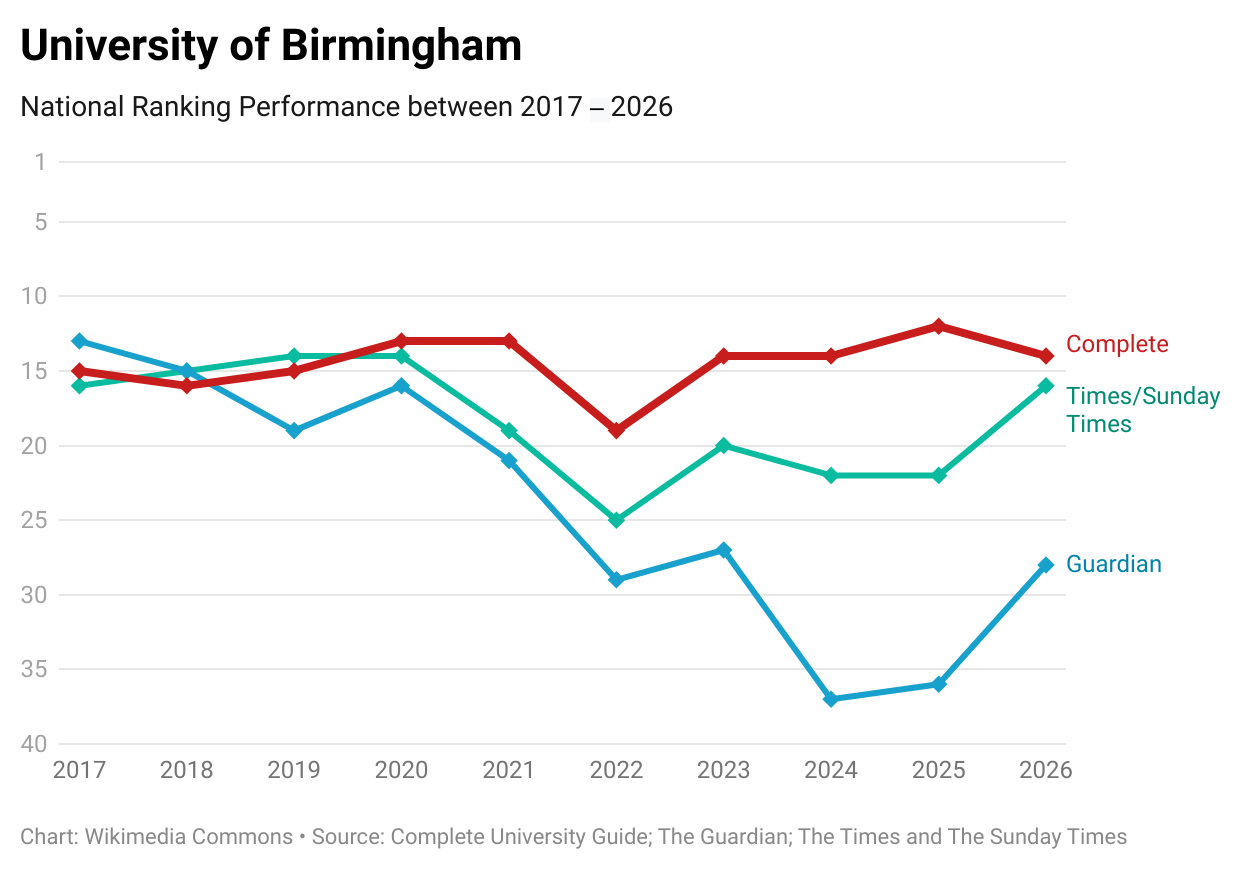
University of Birmingham's national league table performance over the past ten years

In 2026, Birmingham was ranked 12th in the UK and 63rd in the world universities ranking by Time magazine and Statista. The 2022 U.S. News & World Report ranks the university 91st in the world. In 2019, it is ranked 137th among the universities around the world by SCImago Institutions Rankings.

In 2021 the Times Higher Education placed Birmingham 12th in the UK. In 2013, Birmingham was named "Sunday Times University of the Year 2014". The 2013 QS World University Rankings placed the University of Birmingham 10th in the UK and 62nd internationally. Birmingham was ranked 12th in the UK in the 2008 Research Assessment Exercise with 16 per cent of the university's research regarded as world-leading and 41 per cent as internationally excellent, with particular strengths in the fields of music, physics, biosciences, computer science, mechanical engineering, political science, international relations and law.

In 2015 the Complete University Guide placed Birmingham 5th in the UK for graduate prospects.

Data from the Higher Education Funding Council for England (HEFCE) placed the university amongst the twelve elite institutions who among them take more than half of the students with the highest A-level grades.

Birmingham traditionally had a focus on science, engineering, commerce and coal mining, but has now expanded its provision. It hosted the first Cancer Research UK Centre, and making notable contributions to gravitational-wave astronomy, hosting the Institute of Gravitational Wave Astronomy.

The Department of Philosophy ranked 3rd in the 2017 Guardian University League Tables. The combined course of Computer Science and Information Systems, titled Computer Systems Engineering was ranked 4th in the 2016 Guardian University guide.

=== Admissions ===
UCAS Admission Statistics
	2025	2024	2023	2022	2021
Applications (Note: Main scheme applications, International and UK)	64,080	57,625	56,645	57,605	56,850
Accepted	8,670	8,580	7,040	6,540	7,865
Applications/Accepted Ratio	7.4	6.7	8.0	8.8	7.2
Overall Offer Rate (%)	73.1	71.6	66.0	63.1	66.3
↳ UK only (%) (Note: UK domiciled applicants)	70.6	69.8	65.6	61.5	64.7
Average Entry Tariff	—N/a	—N/a	146	161	158
↳ Top three exams (Note: The maximum tariff score for three exams is 168: the equivalent of A*A*A* at A-Level, 777 at HL for the IB Diploma Programme, or AAA at Advanced Higher)	—N/a	—N/a	145.9	152.0	150.2

HESA Student Body Composition (2024/25)
Domicile and Ethnicity	Total
British White (Note: Not be confused solely with White British)	40%
British Ethnic Minorities (Note: Includes those who indicate that they identify as Asian, Black, Mixed Heritage, Arab or any other ethnicity except White)	29%
International EU	1%
International Non-EU	30%
Undergraduate Widening Participation Indicators
Female	55%
Independent School	14%
Low Participation Areas (Note: Calculated from the Polar4 measure, using Quintile1, in England and Wales. Calculated from the Scottish Index of Multiple Deprivation (SIMD) measure, using SIMD20, in Scotland.)	9%

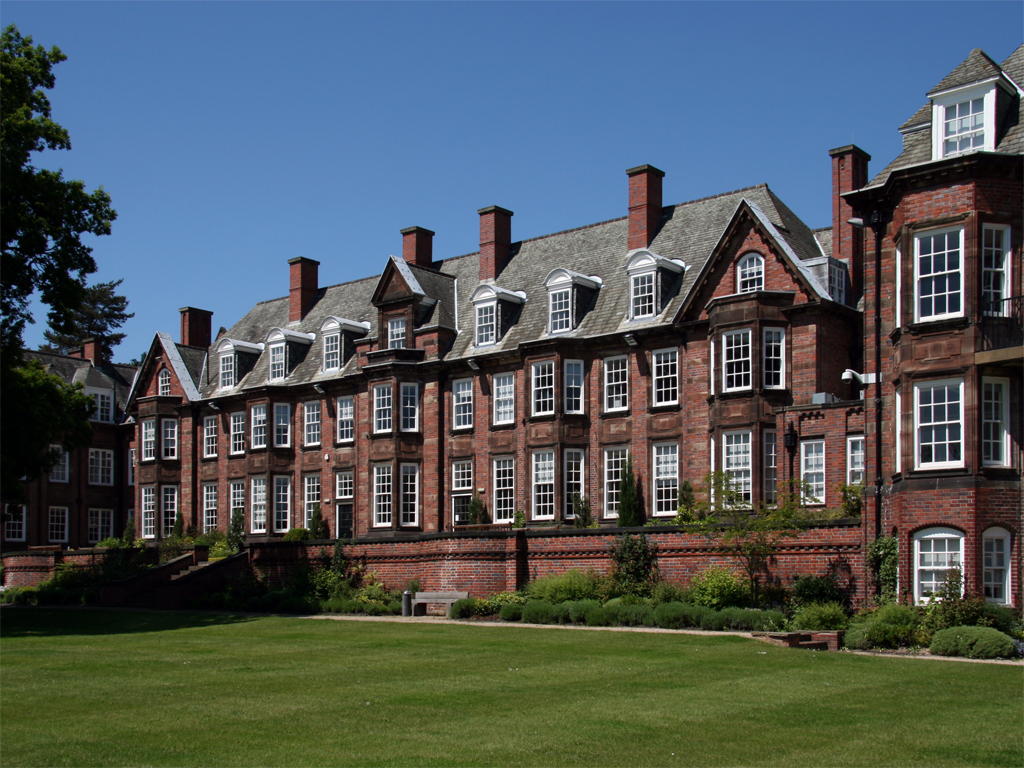
The Birmingham Business School

In the 2024/25 academic year, the student body consisted of 40,025 students, composed of 25,530 undergraduates and 14,500 postgraduate students. The university is consistently designated as a 'high-tariff' institution by the Department for Education, with the average undergraduate entrant to the university in recent years amassing between 145–152 UCAS Tariff points in their top three pre-university qualifications – the equivalent of AAA to A*AA at A-Level. Based on 2022/23 HESA entry standards data published in domestic league tables, which include a broad range of qualifications beyond the top three exam grades, the average student at the University of Birmingham achieved 161 points – the 24th highest in the country. In 2016, the university gave offers of admission to 79.2% of applicants, the 8th highest amongst the Russell Group. In 2022, offers were given to 61.3% of undergraduate applicants, the 30th lowest offer rate across the country. Applications for the Dubai campus can only be submitted directly to the university via the admissions portal. Applications via UCAS are not available.

According to the 2017 Times and Sunday Times Good University Guide, approximately 20% of Birmingham's undergraduates come from independent schools. In the 2016–17 academic year, the university had a domicile breakdown of 76:5:18 of UK:EU:non-EU students respectively, with a female to male ratio of 56:44. 50.3% of international students enrolled at the institution are from China, the fourth highest proportion out of all mainstream universities in the UK.

=== Birmingham Heroes ===
To highlight leading areas of research, the university has launched the Birmingham Heroes scheme. Academics who lead research that impacts on the lives of people regionally, nationally and globally can be nominated for selection. Heroes include:

- Alberto Vecchio and Andreas Freise for their work as part of the LIGO Scientific Collaboration towards the first observation of gravitational waves
- Martin Freer, Toby Peters and Yulong Ding for their work on energy efficient cooling
- Philip Newsome, Thomas Solomon and Patricia Lalor for tackling the silent killers, liver disease and diabetes
- James Arthur, Kristján Kristjánsson, Sandra Cooke and Tom Harrison for promoting character in education
- Lisa Bortolotti, Ema Sullivan-Bissett and Michael Larkin for their work on how to break down the stigma associated with mental illness
- Kate Thomas, Joe Alderman, Rima Dhillon and Shayan Ahmed for their research in and teaching of life sciences
- Pam Kearns, Charlie Craddock and Paul Moss for cancer research
- Anna Phillips, Glyn Humphreys and Janet Lord who research healthy ageing
- Pierre Purseigle, Peter Gray and Bob Stone for using their historical knowledge to advise government organisations
- Paul Bowen and Nick Green for research into new materials to improve energy generation
- Lynne Macaskie, William Bloss and Jamie Lead for their study of pollutants, particularly nanoscale pollutants
- Paul Jackson, Scott Lucas and Stefan Wolff for their work helping with post-conflict and advice on the application of aid
- Hongming Xu, Clive Roberts and Roger Reed for work on sustainable transport
- Moataz Attallah, Kiran Trehan and Tim Daffron for driving economic growth through improving aerospace engineering, developing enterprise and pioneering industrial applications of synthetic biology

=== Birmingham Fellows ===
The Birmingham Fellowship scheme was launched in 2011. The scheme encourages high potential early career researchers to establish themselves as rounded academics and continue pursuing their research interests. This scheme was the first of its kind, and has since been emulated in several other Russell Group universities across the UK. Since 2014, the scheme has been divided into Birmingham Research Fellowships and Birmingham Teaching Fellowships. Birmingham Fellows are appointed to permanent academic posts (with two or three year probation periods), with five years protected time to develop their research.

Birmingham Fellows are usually recruited at a lecturer or senior lecturer level. In the first period of the fellowship, emphasis is placed on the research aspect, publishing high quality academic outputs, developing a trajectory for their work and gaining external funding. However, development of teaching skills is encouraged. Teaching and supervisory responsibilities, as well as administrative duties, then steadily increase to a normal lecturer's load in the Fellow's respective discipline by the fifth year of the fellowship. Birmingham Fellows are not expected to carry out academic administration during their term as Fellows, but will do once their posts turn into lectureships ('three-legged contract'). When accepted into the Birmingham Research Fellowship, Fellows receive a start-up package to develop or continue their research projects, an academic mentor and support for both research and teaching. All fellows are said to become part of the Birmingham Fellows Cohort, which provides them a university-wide network and an additional source of support and mentoring.

=== International cooperation ===
In Germany the University of Birmingham cooperates with the Goethe University Frankfurt. Both cities are linked by a long-lasting partnership agreement.

== Student life ==
=== Guild of Students ===
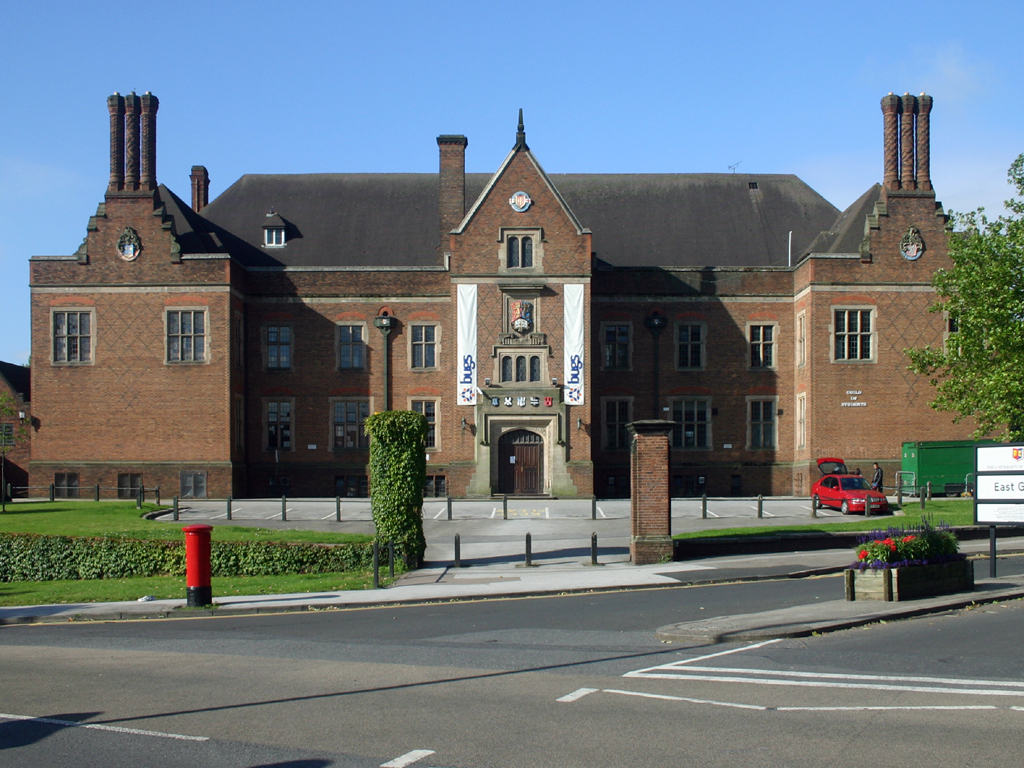
University of Birmingham Guild of Students

The University of Birmingham Guild of Students is the university's student union. Originally the Guild of Undergraduates, the institution had its first foundations in the Mason Science College in the centre of Birmingham around 1876. The University of Birmingham itself formally received its Royal Charter in 1900 with the Guild of Students being provided for as a Student Representative Council. It is not known for certain why the name 'Guild of Students' was chosen as opposed to 'Union of Students'; however, the Guild shares its name with Liverpool Guild of Students, another 'redbrick university'; both organisations subsequently founded the National Union of Students. The Union Building, the Guild's bricks and mortar presence, was designed by the architect Holland W. Hobbiss.

The Guild's official purposes are to represent its members and provide a means of socialising, though societies and general amenities, an example being their internationally famous Bad Film Society. The university provides the Guild with the Union Building effectively rent free as well as a block grant to support student services. The Guild also runs several bars, eateries, social spaces and social events.

The Guild supports a variety of student societies and volunteering projects, roughly around 220 at any one time. The Guild complements these societies and volunteering projects with professional staffed services, including its walk-in Advice and Representation Centre (ARC), Student Activities, Jobs/Skills/Volunteering, Student Mentors in halls, and Community Wardens around Bournbrook. The Guild of Students was where the student volunteering charity InterVol was conceived and developed as a student-led volunteering project in the early 2000s; the project links students with local volunteering opportunities as well as placements with charitable partners overseas. Another of the Guild's long-standing services is Student Advice, which provide advice and guidance on a range of topics. The Guild was one of the first universities in the United Kingdom to publish a campus newspaper, Redbrick, supported financially by the Guild of Students and advertising revenue.

The Guild undertakes its representative function through its officer group, seven of whom are full-time, on sabbatical from their studies, and six of whom are part-time and hold their positions whilst still studying. Elections are held yearly, conventionally February, for the following academic year. These officers have regular contact with the university and staff at all levels. The Guild also supports the university "student reps" scheme, which aims to provide an effective channel of feedback from students on more of a departmental level.

=== Sport ===
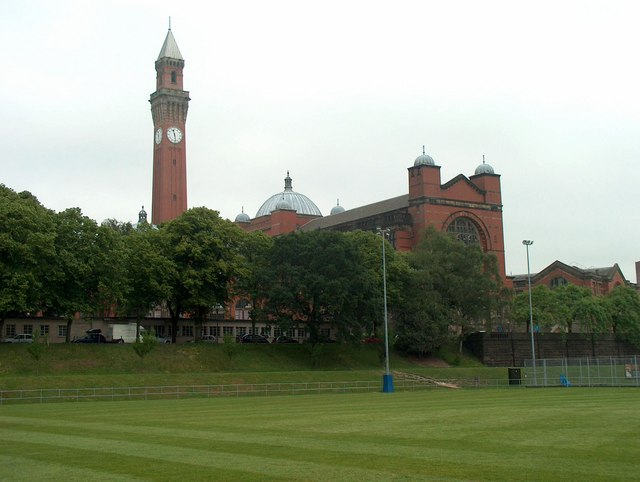
University of Birmingham playing fields

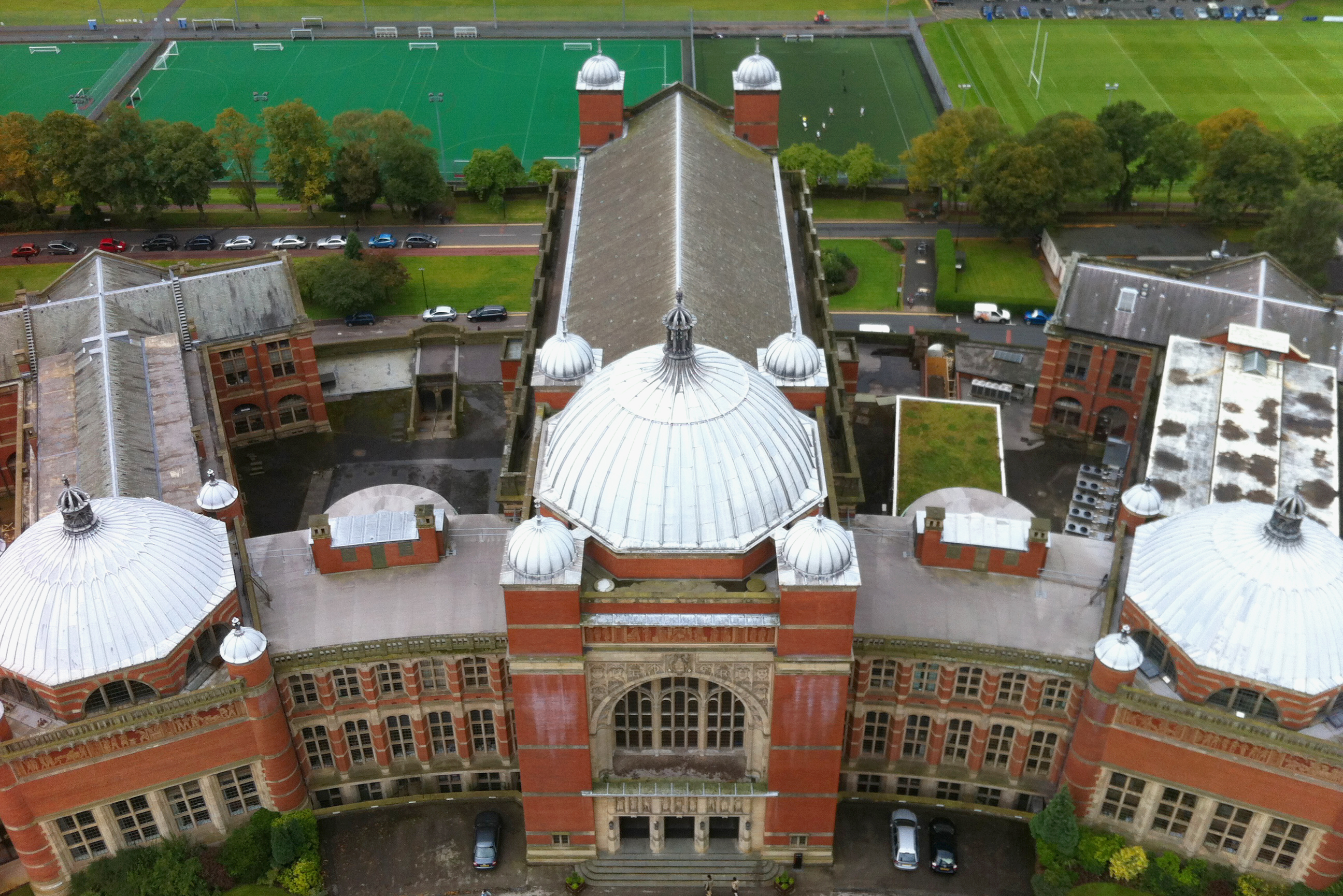
Playing fields from the Clock Tower

University of Birmingham Sport provides a range of sport clubs, including rowing, basketball, cricket, football, rugby union, netball, field hockey, ice hockey, American football, swimming, and triathlon. In May 2017, the university opened the Sport and Fitness Centre providing facilities including a gym, squash courts, 50 m swimming pool, and climbing wall. The university has two international standard hockey pitches, 3G pitches which can be used for 5-a-side and 11-a-side football, netball and tennis courts, and a 400m athletics track at Edgbaston Park Road. The university opened the Raymond Priestley Centre in 1981 on the shores of Coniston Water in the Lake District, offering outdoor activities and learning in the area. University of Birmingham Sport also offers around 30 scholarships and bursaries to national and international students of exceptional athletic ability.

As of the 2019 league, the university is ranked seventh in the British Universities and Colleges Sport league table.

In 2004, six graduates and one student competed in the 2004 Athens Summer Olympics, and four alumni competed at the 2008 Beijing Olympics, including cyclist Paul Manning who won an Olympic Gold. In the 2018 Commonwealth Games, six students and eighteen alumni attended representing England, Scotland, Wales, and Guernsey, and competing in sports including hockey, 1500m, badminton, and cycling. The University had three student athletes competing in Paris 2024, Oliver Morgan in the Olympic swimming, Megan Richter in the Paralympic paratriathlon and Hannah Pearce (South African hockey), as well as a further 14 alumni.

=== Housing ===
The university provides housing for most first-year students, running a guarantee scheme for all those UK applicants who choose Birmingham as their firm UCAS choice. 90 per cent of university-provided housing is inhabited by first-year students.

The university maintained gender-segregated halls until the beginning of the 1998-99 academic year when Lake and Wyddrington "halls" (treated as two different halls, despite being physically one building) were renamed as Shackleton Hall. Chamberlain Hall (Eden Tower), a seventeen-storey tower block, was originally known as High Hall, for male students, and the connected Ridge Hall (later renamed to the Hampton Wing), for female students. University House was decommissioned as accommodation to house the expanding Business School, while Mason Hall has been demolished and rebuilt, opening in 2008. In the summer of 2006, the university sold three of its most distant halls (Hunter Court, the Beeches and Queens Hospital Close) to private operators, while later in the year and during term, the university was forced urgently to decommission both the old Chamberlain Tower (High Hall) and also Manor House over fire safety inspection failures. The university has rebranded its halls offerings into three villages.

==== Vale Village ====
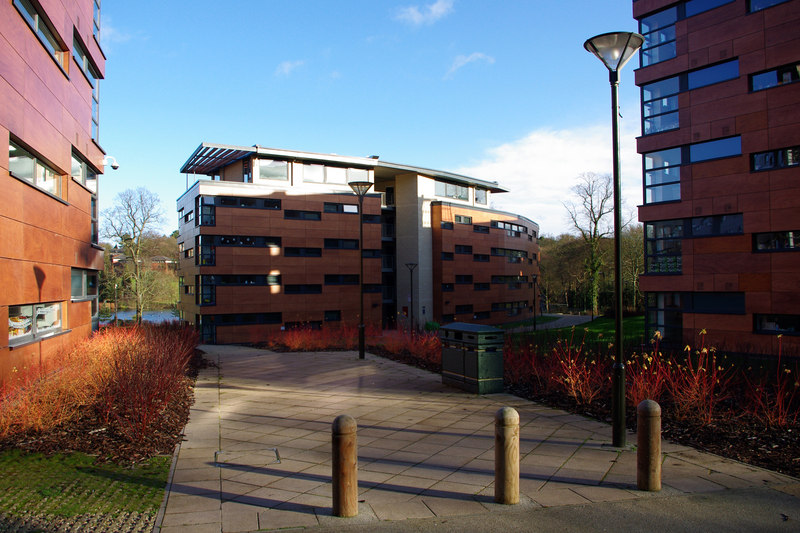
Mason Hall

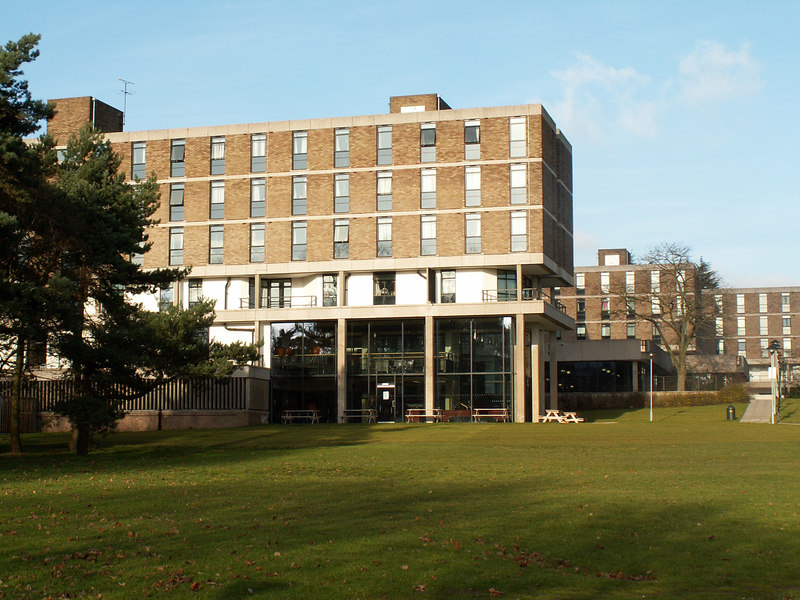
Shackleton Hall

The Vale Village includes Chamberlain Hall, Shackleton, Maple Bank, Tennis Court, Elgar Court and Aitken residences. A sixth hall of residence, Mason Hall, re-opened in September 2008 following a complete rebuild. Approximately 3,500 students live in the village.

Shackleton Hall (originally Lake Hall, for male students, and Wyddrington Hall, for female students) underwent an £11 million refurbishment and was re-opened in Autumn 2004. There are 72 flats housing a total of 350 students. The majority of the units consist of six to eight bedrooms, together with a small number of one, two, three or five bedroom studio/apartments. The redevelopment was designed by Birmingham-based architect Patrick Nicholls while employed at Aedas, now a director of Glancy Nicholls Architects.

Maple Bank was refurbished and opened in summer 2005. It consists of 87 five bedroom flats, housing 435 undergraduates.

The Elgar Court residence consists of 40 six bedroom flats, housing a total of 236 students. It opened in September 2003.

Tennis Court consists of 138 three, four, five and six bedroom flats and houses 697 students.

The Aitken wing is a small complex consisting of 23 six and eight bedroom flats. It houses 147 students.

Construction of the new Mason Hall commenced in June 2006 following the complete demolition of the original 1960s structures. It was designed by Aedas Architects. The entire project is thought to have cost £36.75 million. It has since been completed, with the first year of students moving in September 2008.

The new Chamberlain Tower and neighbouring low rise blocks opened in September 2015. Chamberlain is home to more than 700 first year students. It replaced the old 1964-built 18-storey (above ground level) High Hall (later renamed Eden Tower), for male students and low rise Ridge Hall (later renamed Hampton Wing) for female students, which closed in 2006. The 50-year-old Eden Tower was removed at the start of 2014. Previously known as High Hall, the tower and its associated low rise blocks were demolished after studies revealed it would be uneconomical to refurbish them and would not provide the quality of accommodation which the University of Birmingham desires for students.

The largest student-run event, the Vale Festival or 'ValeFest', is held annually on the Vale. The Festival celebrated its 10th event in 2014, raising £25,000 for charity. The 2019 event was headlined by The Hunna and Saint Raymond.

==== Pritchatts Park Village ====
The Pritchatts Park Village houses more than 700 undergraduate and postgraduate students. Halls include "Ashcroft", "The Spinney" and "Oakley Court", as well as "Pritchatts House" and the "Pritchatts Road Houses".

The Spinney is a small complex of six houses and twelve smaller flats, housing 104 students in total. Ashcroft consists of four purpose built blocks of flats and houses 198 students. The four-storey Pritchatts House consists of 24 duplex units and houses 159 students. Oakley Court consists of 21 individual purpose-built flats, ranging in size from five to thirteen bedrooms. Also included are 36 duplex units. A total of 213 students are housed in Oakley Court, made up of undergraduates. Oakley Court was completed in 1993 at a cost of £2.9 million. It was designed by Birmingham-based Associated Architects. Pritchatts Road is a group of four private houses that were converted into student residences. There is a maximum of 16 bedrooms per house.

==== Selly Oak Village ====
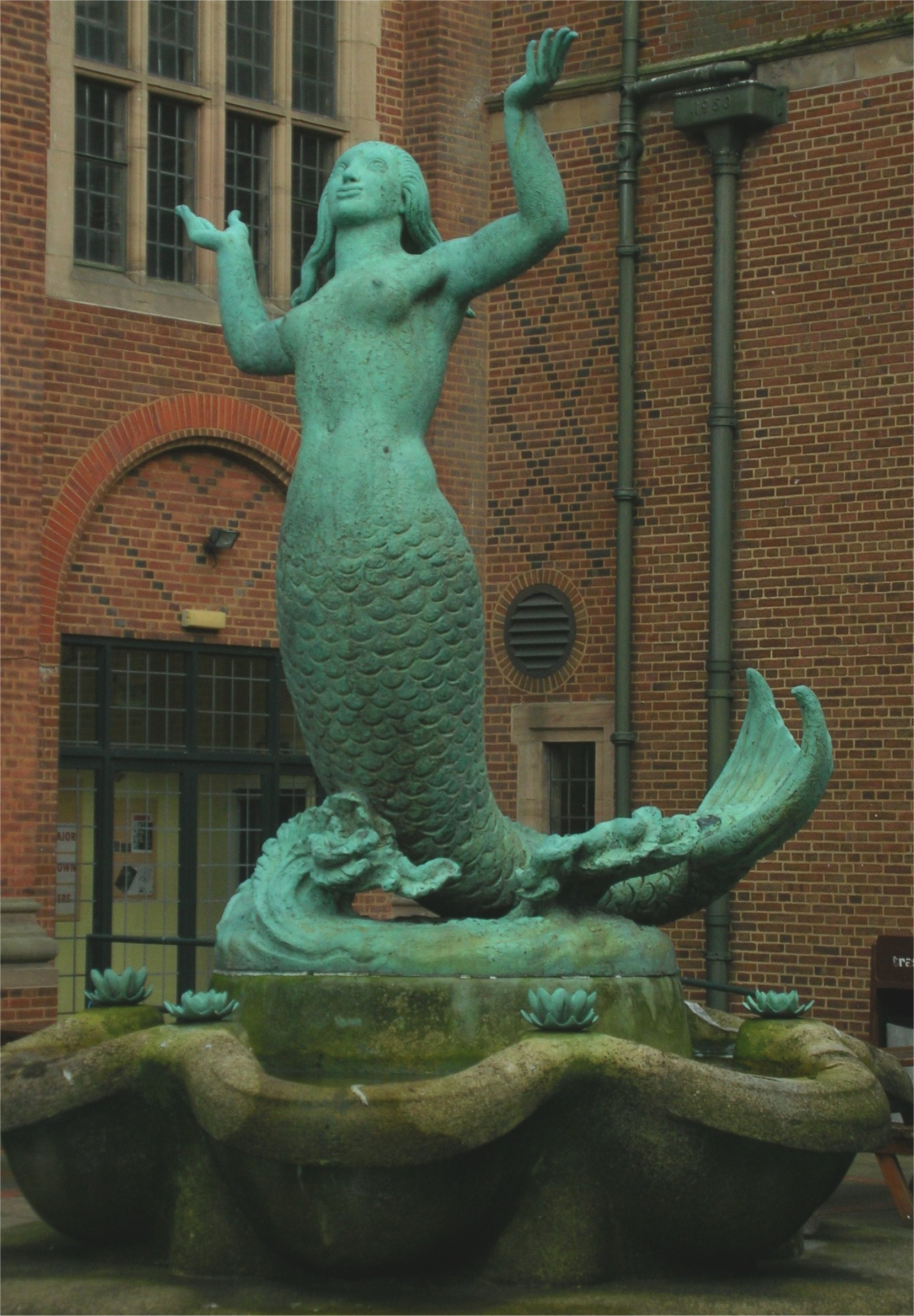
William Bloye's mermaid fountain at the University of Birmingham

Selly Oak Village consists of three residences in the Selly Oak and Bournbrook areas: Jarratt Hall, which is owned by the university, Douper Hall, and The Metalworks. As of 2008, the village had 637 bed spaces for students.

Jarratt Hall is a large complex designed around a central courtyard and three landscaped areas. It housed 587 undergraduate students as of 2012. Jarratt Hall did not accommodate postgraduate students until September 2013, owing to ongoing refurbishment of kitchens and the heating system.

==== The Manor House, Northfield ====
The University of Birmingham also own the Northfield Manor House, having acquired the property from the Cadbury family in 1953. The property was used as The Manor House student accommodation until 2007, when the halls were found to be in need of restoration and refurbishment. In 2014, however, arsonists set a fire that gutted much of the property. The University of Birmingham has rebuilt and restored the property since then, and has converted much of the site into flats.

==== Student Housing Co-operative accommodation ====
Birmingham Student Housing Co-operative was opened in 2014 by students of the university to provide affordable self managed housing for its members. The co-operative manages a property on Pershore Road in Selly Oak.

== Notable people ==
=== Academics ===
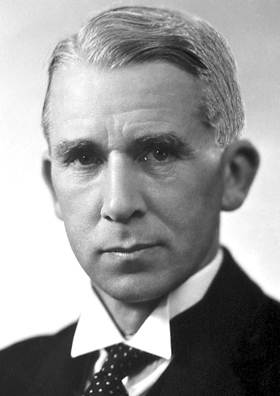
Nobel Prize winner Sir Norman Haworth

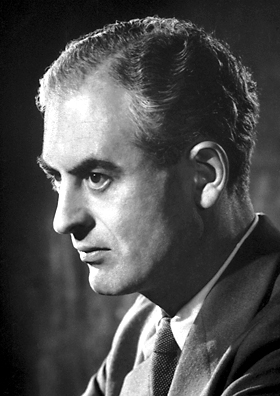
Nobel Prize winner Sir Peter Medawar

The faculty and staff members connected with the university include Nobel laureates Sir Norman Haworth (Professor of Chemistry, 1925–1948), Sir Peter Medawar (Mason Professor of Zoology, 1947–1951), John Robert Schrieffer (NSF Fellow at Birmingham, 1957), David Thouless, Michael Kosterlitz, and Sir Fraser Stoddart.

Physicists include John Henry Poynting, Freeman Dyson, Sir Otto Frisch, Sir Rudolf Peierls, Sir Marcus Oliphant, Sir Leonard Huxley, Harry Boot, Sir John Randall, and Edwin Ernest Salpeter. Chemists include Sir William A. Tilden. Mathematicians include Jonathan Bennett, Henry Daniels, Daniela Kühn, Deryk Osthus, Daniel Pedoe and G. N. Watson. In music, faculty members include the composers Sir Edward Elgar and Sir Granville Bantock. Geologists include Charles Lapworth, Frederick Shotton, and Sir Alwyn Williams. In medicine, faculty members include Sir Melville Arnott and Sir Bertram Windle. Biologists include William Hillhouse and George Stephen West, both Mason Professors of Botany.

Author and literary critic David Lodge taught English from 1960 until 1987. Poet and playwright Louis MacNeice was a lecturer in classics 1930–1936. English novelist, critic, and man of letters Anthony Burgess taught in the extramural department (1946–50). Richard Hoggart founded the Centre for Contemporary Cultural Studies. Sir Alan Walters was Professor of Econometrics and Statistics (1951–68) and later became Chief Economic Adviser to Prime Minister Margaret Thatcher. Peter C. B. Phillips, one of the most widely cited economists of all time, was Professor of Econometrics and Social Statistics. Lord Zuckerman was Professor of Anatomy 1946–1968 and also served as chief scientific adviser to the British government from 1964 to 1971. Lord King of Lothbury was a Professor in the Faculty of Commerce and later became Governor of the Bank of England. Sir William James Ashley was first Dean and the founder of the Birmingham Business School.

Sir Nathan Bodington was Professor of Classics. Sir Michael Lyons was Professor of Public Policy from 2001 to 2006. Sir Kenneth Mather was Professor of genetics (1948) and recipient of the 1964 Darwin Medal. Sir Richard Redmayne was Professor of Mining and later became first Chief Inspector of Mines. The art historian Sir Nikolaus Pevsner held a research post at the university. Sir Ellis Waterhouse was Barber Professor of Fine Art (1952–1970). Lord Cadman taught petroleum engineering and is credited with creating the course 'Petroleum Engineering'. The philosopher Sir Michael Dummett held an assistant lectureship at the university. Lord Borrie was a professor of law and dean of the faculty of law. Sir Charles Raymond Beazley was Professor of History. Prison reformer Margery Fry was first warden of University House.

Vice-Chancellors and Principals include Sir Oliver Lodge, Lord Hunter of Newington, Sir Charles Grant Robertson, Sir Raymond Priestley, and Sir Michael Sterling.

=== Alumni ===
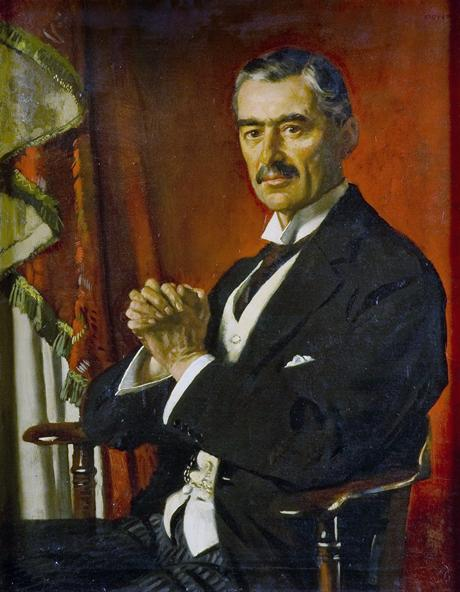
British Prime Minister
Neville Chamberlain

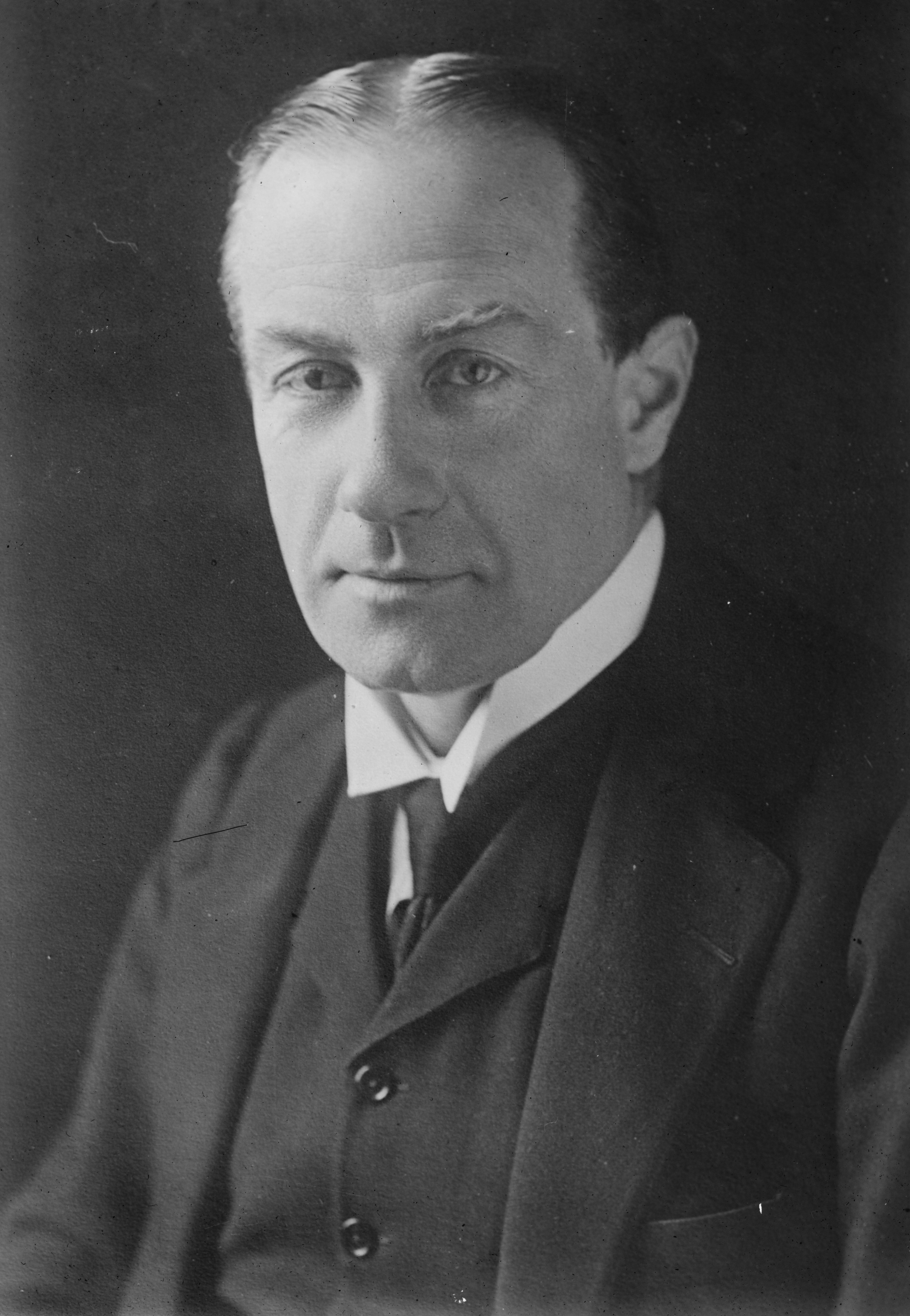
British Prime Minister
Stanley Baldwin

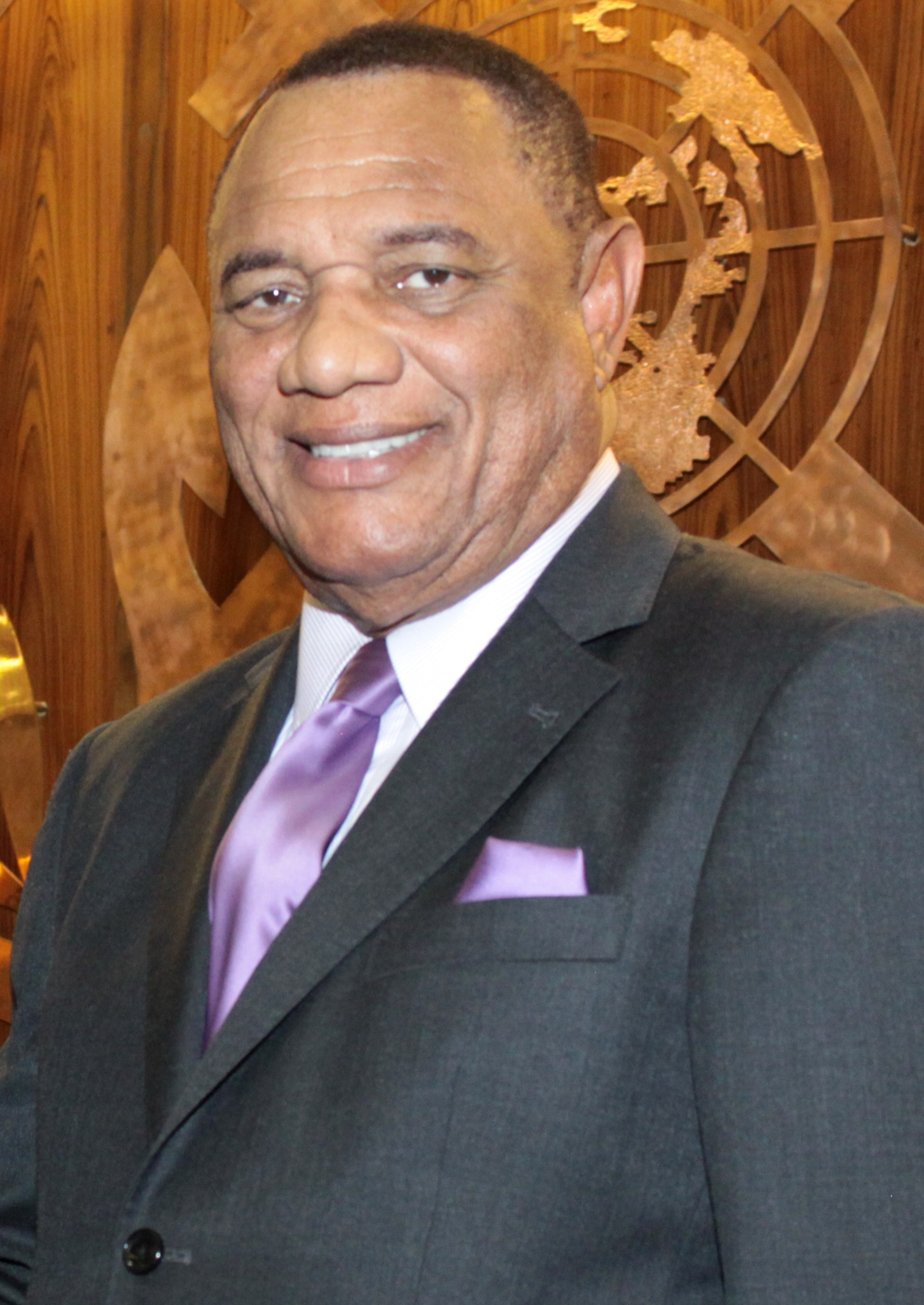
Bahamian Prime Minister
Perry Christie

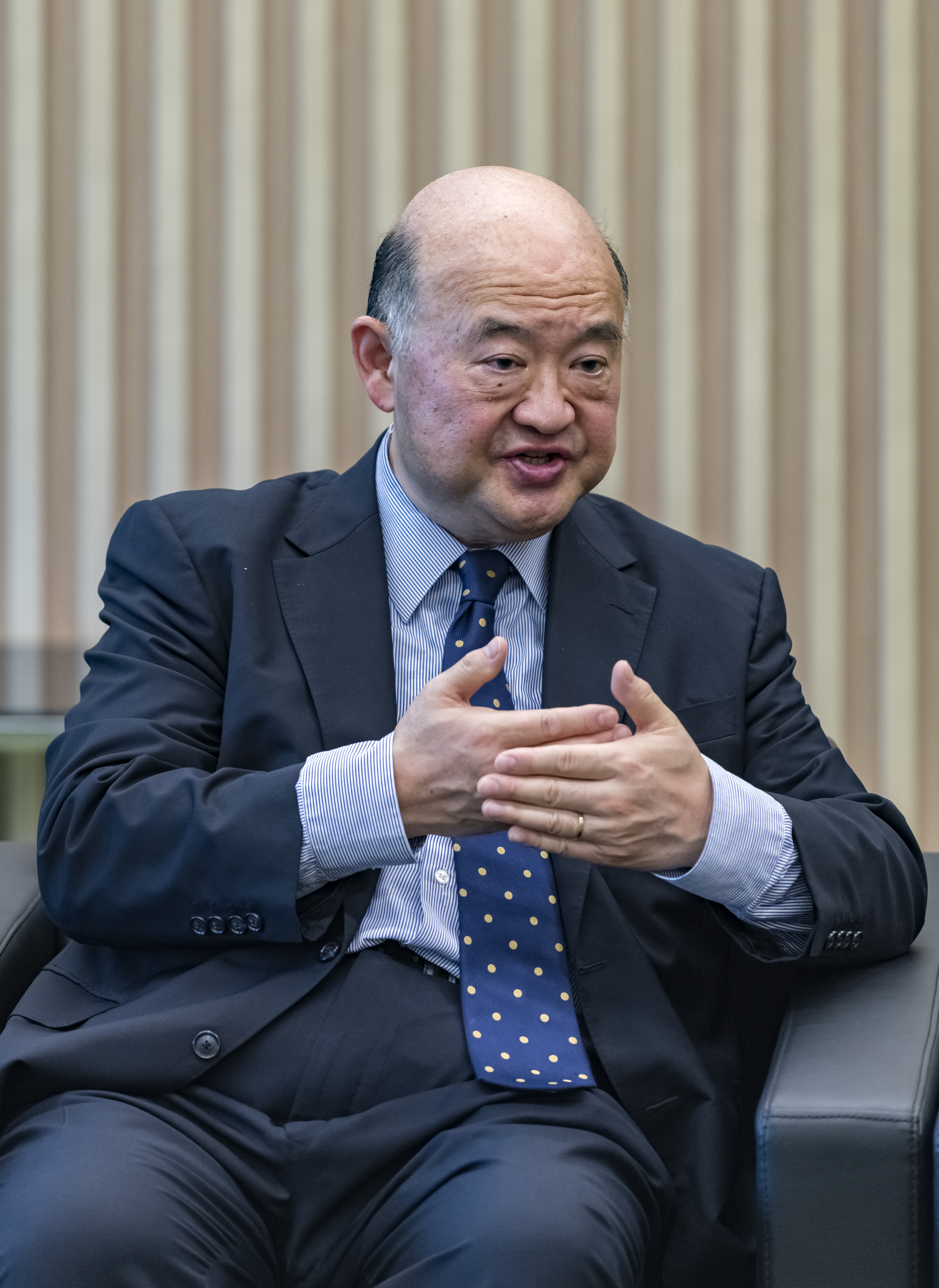
Chief Justice of Hong Kong
Geoffrey Ma

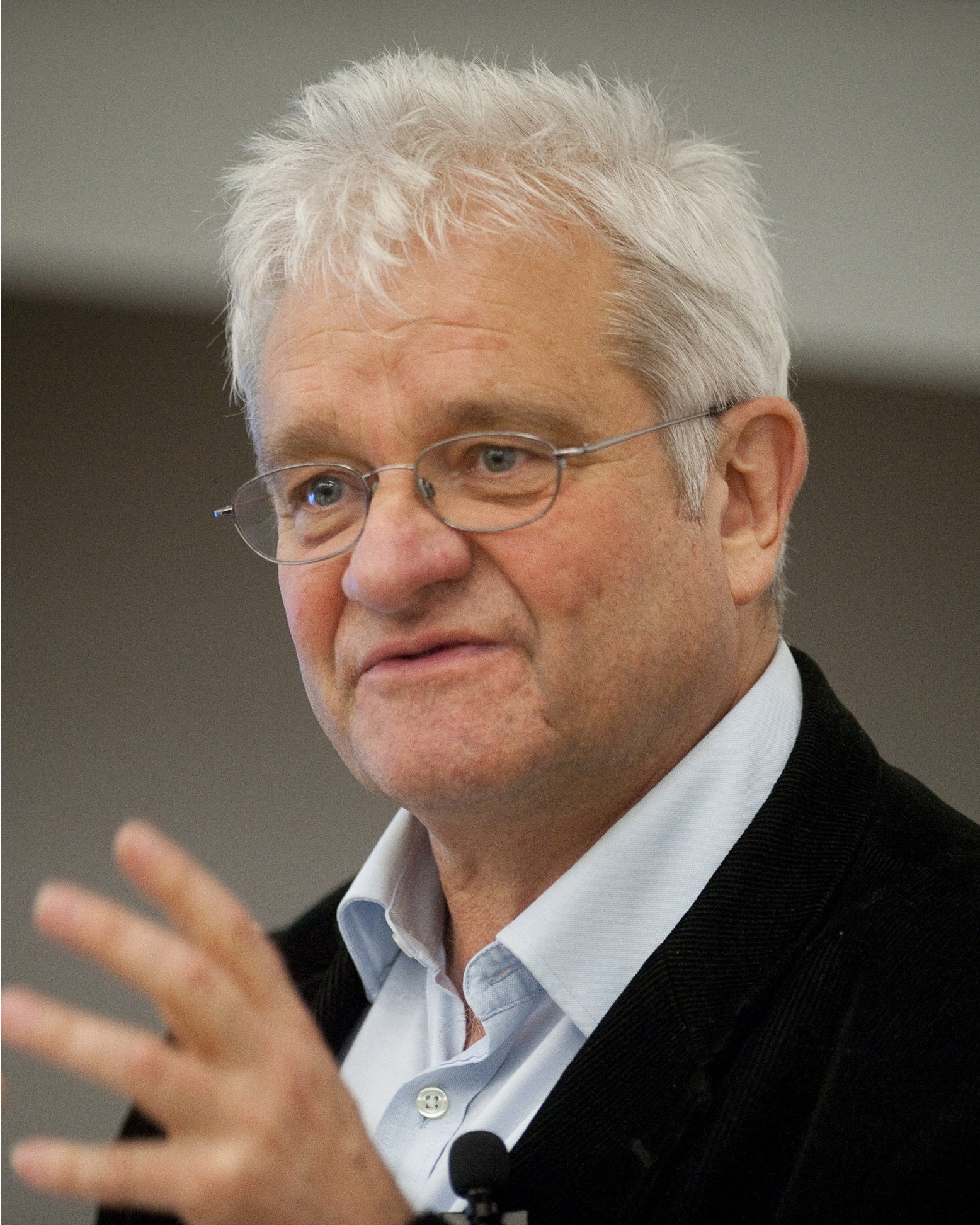
Nobel Prize laureate
Sir Paul Nurse

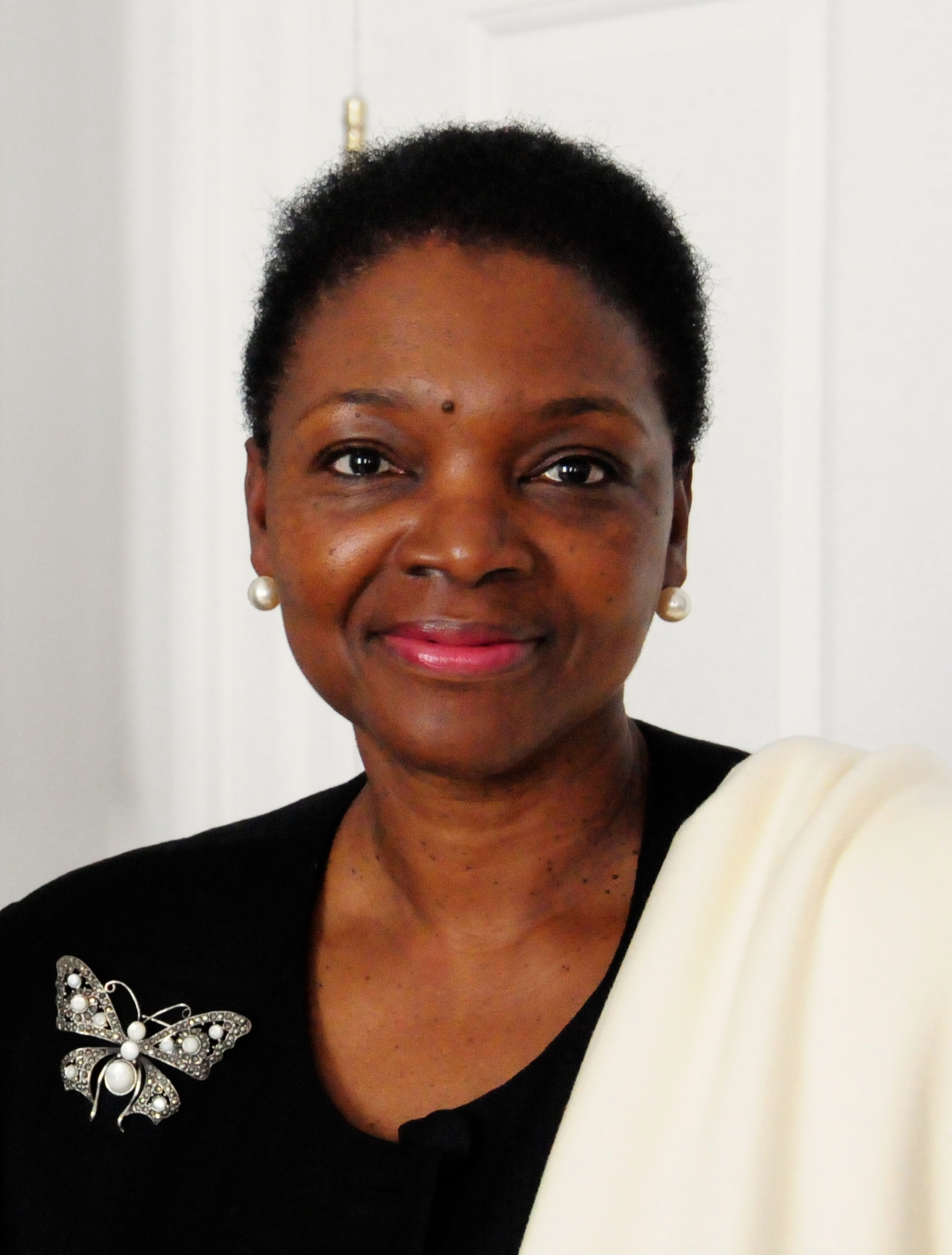
Politician and diplomat
Baroness Amos

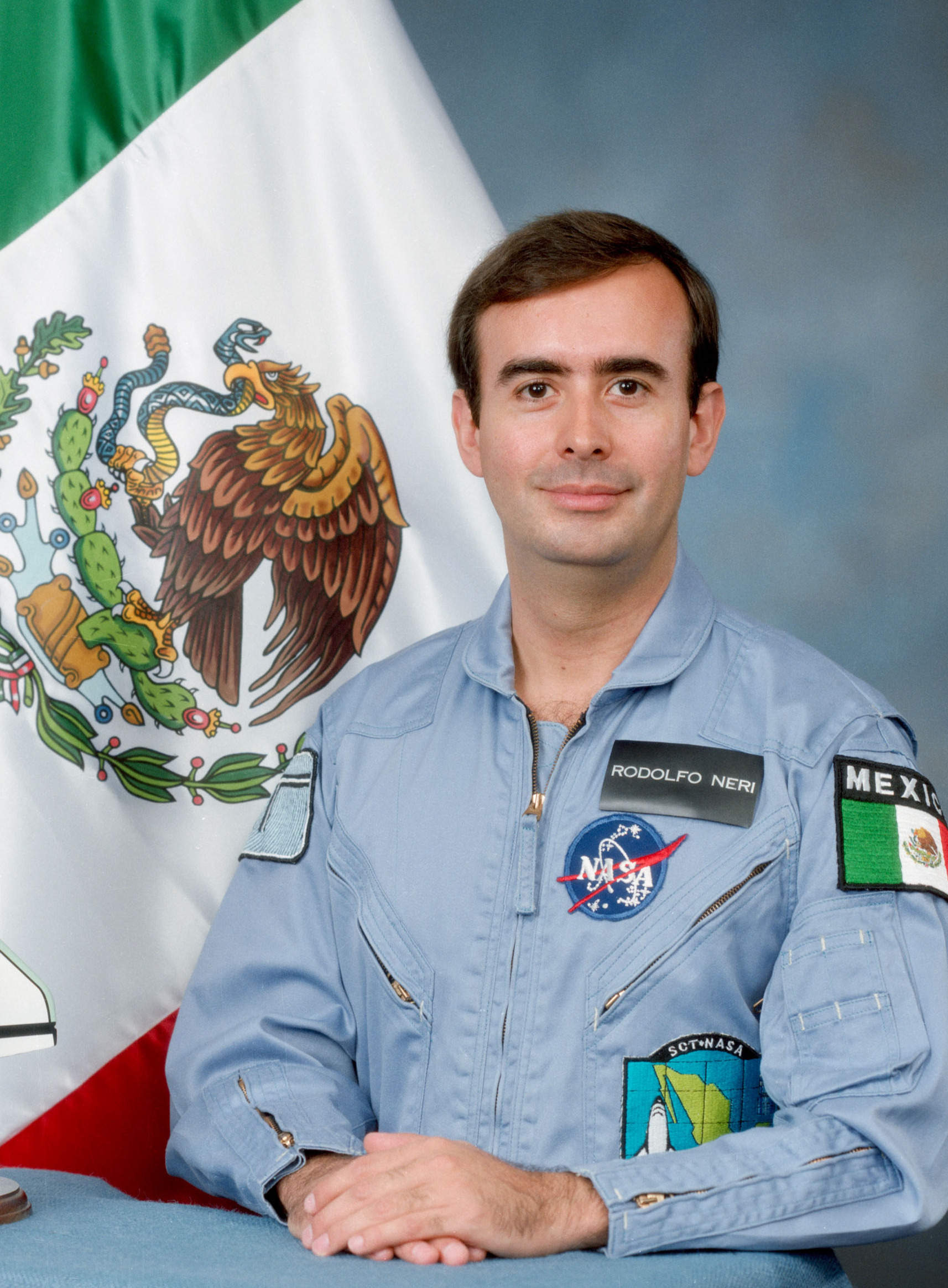
Astronaut
Rodolfo Neri Vela

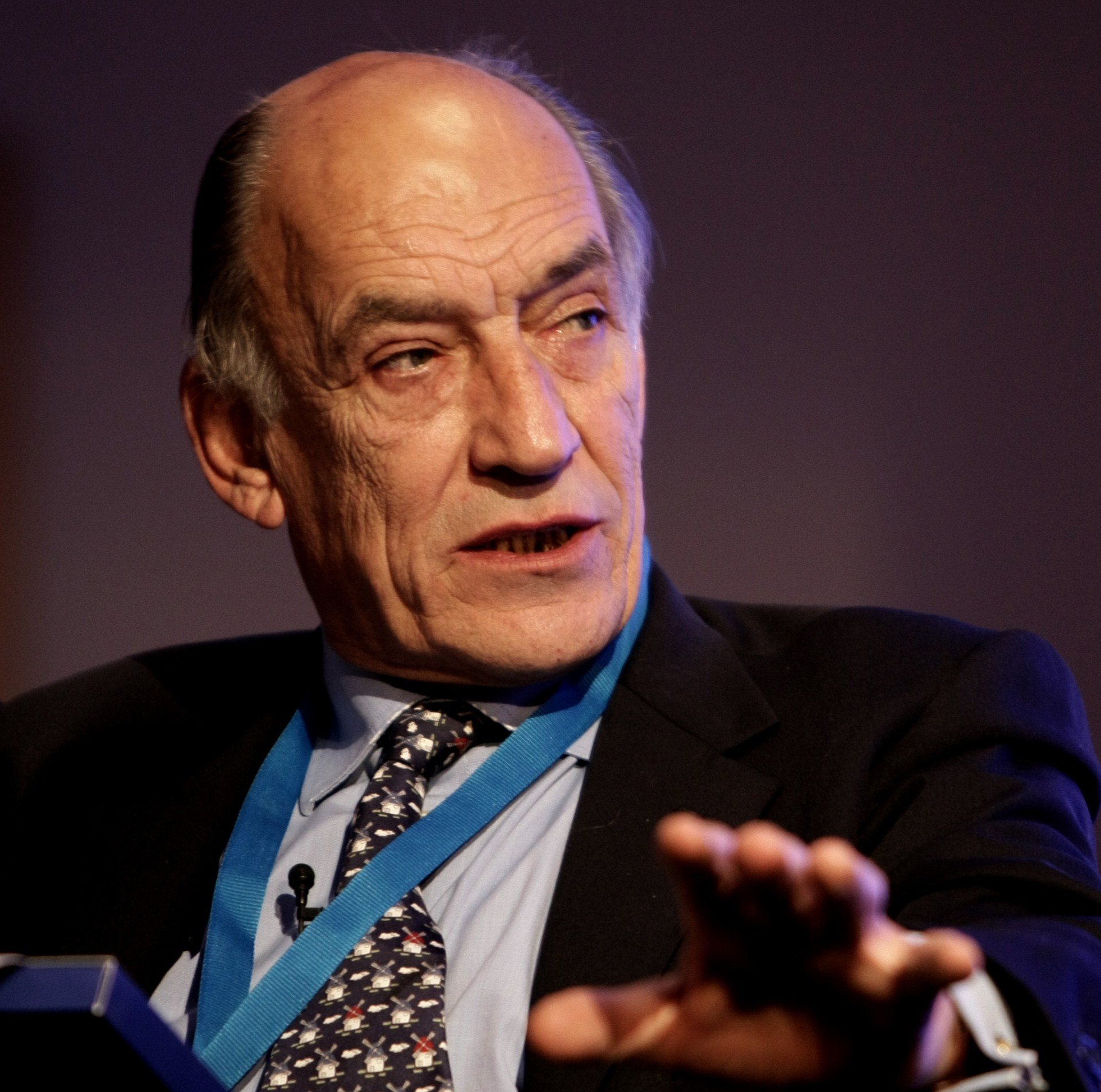
Former Chief of the General Staff General Sir Mike Jackson

Four Nobel Prize laureates are University of Birmingham alumni: Francis Aston, Maurice Wilkins, Sir John Vane, and Sir Paul Nurse. In addition soil scientist Peter Bullock contributed to the reports of the IPCC, which was awarded the Nobel Peace Prize in 2007.

The university's alumni in British government and politics include: British Prime Ministers Stanley Baldwin and Neville Chamberlain; Chief Minister of Gibraltar Joe Bossano; British cabinet minister and UN Under-Secretary-General Baroness Amos; Cabinet Ministers Julian Smith and Hilary Armstrong; British High Commissioner to New Zealand and Ambassador to South Africa Sir David Aubrey Scott; Governor of the Turks and Caicos Islands Nigel Dakin; Welsh Assembly Government minister Jane Davidson; and UN weapons inspector David Kelly.

Birmingham's alumni in international government and politics include: Prime Minister of St. Lucia Kenny Anthony; Prime Minister of the Bahamas Perry Christie; Deputy Prime Minister of Mauritius Rashid Beebeejaun;Togolese minister of maritime economy Edem Tengue and Zambian President Hakainde Hichilema.

Alumni in business include: director of the Bank of England Lord Roll of Ipsden; CEO of J Sainsbury plc Mike Coupe; Chairman of the Shell Transport and Trading Company plc Sir John Jennings; automobile executive Sir George Turnbull; President of the Confederation of British Industry Sir Clive Thompson; CEO and chairman of BP Sir Peter Walters; Chairman of British Aerospace Sir Austin Pearce and chairman and CEO of Bass plc Sir Ian Prosser. John Crabtree, served as High Sheriff of the West Midlands and Lord Lieutenant of the West Midlands, and as chair of the 2022 Birmingham Commonwealth Games Organising Committee.

Alumni in the legal arena include: Hong Kong Chief Justice of the Court of Final Appeal Geoffrey Ma Tao-li; Hong Kong Judge of the Court of Final Appeal Robert Tang; Justice of Appeal at the Court of Appeal in Tanzania Robert Kisanga; Justice of the Supreme Court of Belize Michelle Arana; Lord Justice of Appeal Sir Philip Otton; and High Court Judges Dame Nicola Davies, Sir Michael Davies, Sir Henry Globe, and Dame Lucy Theis.

Alumni in the armed forces include Chief of the General Staff General Sir Mike Jackson; and Director General of the Army Medical Services Alan Hawley.

Alumni in the sphere of religion include: Metropolitan Archbishop and Primate of the Anglican Church in South East Asia Bolly Lapok; Anglican Bishops Paul Bayes, Alan Smith, Stephen Venner, Michael Langrish, and Eber Priestley; Anglican Suffragan Bishops Brian Castle and Colin Docker; Catholic Archbishop Kevin McDonald; and Catholic bishop Philip Egan.

Alumni in the field of healthcare include: chair of the National Institute for Clinical Excellence David Haslam; the first woman to be elected as president of the Royal College of Obstetricians and Gynaecologists Dame Hilda Lloyd; Chief Scientific Officer in the NHS Sue Hill; Chief Dental Officer for England Barry Cockcroft; and Chief Medical Officer for England Sir Liam Donaldson.

Alumni in the creative industries include: actors Fiona Button, Madeleine Carroll, Tim Curry, Tamsin Greig, Geoffrey Hutchings, Elizabeth Henstridge, and Norman Painting; actors and comedians Victoria Wood and Chris Addison; dancer/choreographer and co-creator of 'Riverdance' Jean Butler, musicians Simon Le Bon of Duran Duran and Christine McVie of Fleetwood Mac, and founder of the Vagina Museum Florence Schechter.

Alumni in academia include: University Vice-Chancellors Frank Horton, Sir Louis Matheson, Sir Alex Jarratt, Sir Philip Baxter, Berrick Saul, and Wahid Omar; neurobiologist Sir Gabriel Horn, physicians Sir Alexander Markham, Sir Gilbert Barling, and Sir Arthur Thomson; physicists John Stewart Bell, Sir Alan Cottrell, Lord Flowers, Harry Boot, Elliott H. Lieb (recipient of the 2003 Henri Poincaré Prize), Edwin Ernest Salpeter (recipient of the 1997 Crafoord Prize in Astronomy), Sir Ernest William Titterton, and Raymond Wilson (recipient of the 2010 Kavli Prize in Astrophysics); statistician Peter McCullagh; chemist Sir Robert Howson Pickard; biologists Sir Kenneth Murray and Lady Noreen Murray; zoologists Desmond Morris and Karl Shuker; behavioural neuroscientist Barry Everitt; palaeontologist Harry B. Whittington; literary critich Lorna Sage; philosopher John Lewis; theologian and biochemist Arthur Peacocke; labour economist David Blanchflower; ninth President of Cornell University Frank H. T. Rhodes; Government Chief Scientific Adviser Sir Alan Cottrell; and former astronaut Rodolfo Neri Vela.

Alumni in sport include: sailor Lisa Clayton; team pursuit cyclist Paul Manning; former footballer Izzy Christiansen; Warwickshire and England cricketer Jim Troughton; skeleton racer Adam Pengilly; triathletes Chrissie Wellington and Rachel Joyce; field hockey players Lily Owsley and Sophie Bray; and middle-distance athlete Hannah England and Luke Gunn.

== See also ==
- Armorial of UK universities
- List of modern universities in Europe (1801–1945)
- List of universities in the United Kingdom

== Bibliography ==
- Foster, A. (2005). Birmingham (Pevsner Architectural Guides). London: Yale University Press. ISBN 0-300-10731-5.
- Ives, Eric William; Schwarz, L. D.; Drummond, Diane K. (2000). The First Civic University: Birmingham 1880-1980 An Introductory History. Birmingham, UK: University of Birmingham Press. ISBN 1-902459-07-5.
- The University of Birmingham Yearbook 2002–2003.
- Cheesewright, M. (1975). Mirror to a Mermaid. Birmingham: The University of Birmingham Press. ISBN 0-7044-0130-4.
- Braithwaite, L. (1987). University of Birmingham Architectural Trail. Birmingham: The University of Birmingham Press. ISBN 0-7044-0890-2.
- Hughes, A. (1950). The University of Birmingham : A Short History. Birmingham: The University of Birmingham Press.
