= Isabel Fry =

English educator and social activist

- Born: 25 March 1869; England
- Died: 26 March 1958 (aged 89)
- Occupations: Educator; social activist
- Known for: Founding the Farmhouse School
- Notable work: Uninitiated (1895); The Day of Small Things (1901); A Key to Language (1925)
- Parent(s): Sir Edward Fry (father); Mariabella Hodgkin (mother)
- Relatives: Agnes Fry (twin sister); Roger Fry (brother); Joan Mary Fry (sister); Margery Fry (sister); Ruth Fry (sister)

Isabel Fry (25 March 1869– 26 March 1958) was an English educator and social activist.

== Early life ==
She was one of twins, with her sister Agnes Fry, born to the barrister and judge Sir Edward Fry and his wife Mariabella Hodgkin. They were younger sisters of Roger Fry, the art critic, who used to call them "the twinges". Her background, which was Quaker, was mentioned in her obituary in The Times, her 60 first cousins being a cross-section of those prominent in British intellectual life. Her other prominent siblings were Joan Mary Fry, Margery Fry, and Ruth Fry.

Fry had a governess, disliking the object lesson style of instruction, and attended Highfield, a boarding school at Liphook in Hampshire, for a year at age 16. With no further formal instruction, she travelled with the family, and did some teaching of "factory girls". She wrote a note in Nature in 1887, from Highgate, about a meteor. In 1896 she was part of the British Astronomical Association expedition to Norway to observe the total solar eclipse of August 9. She subsequently joined the association on 25 November 1896 at the proposal of Andrew Crommelin.

The well-connected Frys were also an "enclave". Isabel asked her mother if she could study at the University of Cambridge. In answer, there was "[...] she might then have the misfortune to marry one of Roger's friends, and, as it was, her father's dinner-time conversation supplied her with ample education [...]". None of the six daughters, referred to by Quaker relations as "those poor Fry girls", ever married.

Constance Crommelin, sister of the astronomer Andrew Crommelin, visited the family house at Failand in Somerset. Then at her invitation, Fry taught in 1891–2 at the Brighton Wimbledon House school (the future Roedean School), attended by her younger sister Margery Fry. She made a break from her family at this point.

== Teaching in London ==
Around 1895 Fry moved to London with Constance Crommelin. She worked as a governess, if not conventionally, having Margaret Lois Garrett and Dorothy Garrod as pupils. She taught small groups of children in homes. She began teaching in London private schools, one of which was at the Harley Street home of Walter Jessop. She taught at Allenswood School run by Marie Souvestre; and then founded her own school in Marylebone Road.

In 1908 Fry encountered Halide Edib and visited Turkey. Edib wrote a letter to The Nation, and Fry replied. Salih Zeki, at that time Edib's husband, called on Fry in London. There resulted a visit in which Fry travelled to Turkey in February 1909, for a stay of three weeks. She met female reformers, and visited schools. She persuaded the Balkan Committee, formed as a result of the 1902–4 phase of the Macedonian Struggle, for whom her father was active, to fund in 1910 bursaries for education of Turkish girls.

In 1909 Fry took Rectory Farm, a house in Great Hampden, Buckinghamshire, jointly with Constance who had married John Masefield in 1903. Masefield's novel Multitude and Solitude of 1909 contains characters Ottalie Fawcett, based on Constance, and her friend Agatha who is "an independent-minded, jealous-temperamented woman", based on Isabel, drawn rather closely from life. Ulick O'Connor, claiming that Isabel had demanded most of Constance's time after the marriage, called her a "sinister spinster".

After the Ottoman countercoup of 1909, Halide Edib became a refugee in Egypt with her young sons. Fry wrote to her, and Edib sailed to Tilbury on a visit to Fry in Marylebone Road. She was taken to Great Hampden, where she heard Masefield read. She heard John Dillon speak in the House of Commons, and met Henry Nevinson.

Still engaged with London life, Fry was involved in political discussions there in 1911 with Bronislaw Malinowski. She lost friends including Tancred Borenius over attitudes sympathetic to Russia. From 1912 she held classes at Rectory Farm, for deprived children. During the period 1913 to 1915, she ran a school in Gayton Road, Hampstead.

In 1914, before the outbreak of World War I, Fry paid another visit to Edib in Turkey. She met leaders of the Young Turk movement: Talaat Pasha, and Midhat Shukri with whom she could not resolve her differences.

Fry was engaged during World War I in Quaker relief work, as were her sisters Joan, Margery and Ruth. She had rejected the orthodox pacifism of the Society of Friends in 1913; and resigned from the Society, on the basis as stated by her biographer that "they tolerated inaction against evil for the sake of unity". Mijin Cho, in British Quaker women and peace, 1880s to 1920s (Ph.D. dissertation, 2010) has investigated Fry's attitude to pacifism from her diary, finding the evidence inconclusive. She differed on the issue from her sisters. She was not disowned by the Society of Friends. She did author a pacifist pamphlet. She signed a letter appearing in the Positivist Review in 1915, advocating solution of disputes by arbitration, with a group including Hypatia Bradlaugh Bonner, William Archer and Gilbert Murray.

== The Farmhouse School ==
In 1917 Fry set up the Farmhouse School in Buckinghamshire. It was at Mayortorne Manor, between Great Missenden and Wendover, and took boys and girls. She ran it for 12 years, to about 1930; her views were influenced by John Dewey, Maria Montessori and progressive education. Norah Ellen Laycock (1877–1951), a science graduate of the University of London, took over the school when Fry left.

There were 35 acres (14 ha) of grounds. Mary Medd, a pupil there around 1920 for one year, described the library in the manor: "filled with books and periodicals of all sorts for everyone to read". The school was also a small dairy farming business, and teaching mixed farm work with conventional education. The curriculum included economics, morality, and grammar taught with Fry's personal system. Interviewed by Josephine Ransom, she stated her belief in teaching "through work rather than solely by books". She spoke about her ideas at the 1918 New Ideals in Education conference in Oxford.

Pupils gained the impression of "a formidable lady dressed in tweed drawers who painted, sang comic songs, and wrote the school plays." The school attracted a number of pupils whose parents were in the Bloomsbury Group. Fry expressed reservations about the Group, its male domination and male homosexuality.

Noël Oakeshott née Moon the archaeologist was a pupil from 1917, being taught Latin in a class, and Greek on her own. The opening of Japan to Western influence was an essay topic given, to be done from books in the library. Her mother Ethel, married to Robert Oswald Moon, had known Constance Crommelin in the 1890s. A pupil of the 1920s was Igor Anrep, son of Boris Anrep, who entered a school with around 40 girls, and half-a-dozen boys: he found milking cows preferable to football, but enjoyed other sports such as netball. Julian Trevelyan was a pupil who disliked the discipline, of a Quaker style.

A French language teacher at the Farmhouse School was Eugénie Dubois, Belgian and from Linkebeek. Through this connection, a daughter of Céline Dangotte, the Belgian feminist, was educated at the school. Dubois, known as "Gege", became a close friend to Fry.

== Later life ==
Fry had taken the outcome of the 1926 General Strike to heart, and after leaving Mayortorne Manor had a number of difficult years. She spent time in Wales, working in Quaker settlements of unemployed miners that had been set up by her sister Joan. She worked county Durham, at a social centre for miners, with little success. She went to the Caldicot Community near Maidstone, Kent.

In 1934 Fry spent one term running Stoatley Rough School for refugee children. She founded another school, at Church Farm, Buckland, Buckinghamshire, with support of someone who had worked at Mayortorne Manor. It was intended for refugees and deprived children.

At the time of the Second Italo-Ethiopian War, Fry was a supporter of Sylvia Pankhurst's New Times and Ethiopian News, sitting on its advisory board.

Isabel Fry died in 1958.

== Works ==
Fry published:

- Uninitiated (1895)
- The Day of Small Things (1901) It included three stories published in The Dome in 1900: "Silkworms and Tigers", "A Mitigated Punishment" and "Special Providences".
- A Key to Language (1925)

== Collections ==
Fry kept journals, extant from 1911 to her death, though missing for periods 1921–1934 and 1936–1940. The journals were left to Eugénie Dubois, who allowed Fry's biographer Beatrice Curtis Brown access. Letters from Fry to Dubois survive, from the period after she left the school. Eric Dubois gave Fry's papers held by his mother Eugénie to the Institute of Education in 1983.
