= Joseph Storrs Fry II =

British businessman (1826–1913)

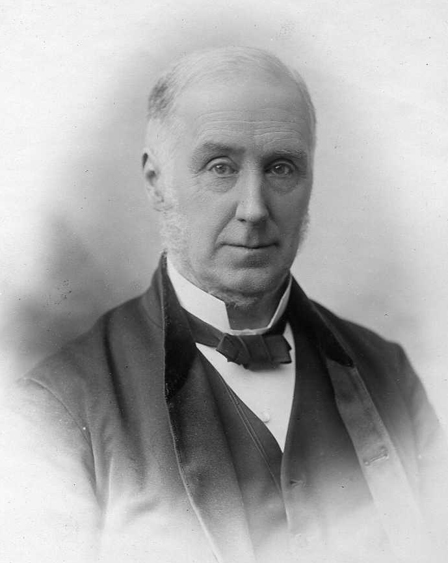
- before 1913
- Born: 1826; Bristol, England
- Died: 1913 (aged 86–87)

Joseph Storrs Fry (6 August 1826 – 7 July 1913) was a member of the Bristol Fry family, head of the family chocolate firm of J. S. Fry & Sons and a philanthropist. Joseph Fry (1795–1879) and Mary Ann Swaine were his parents. His grandfather was the first Joseph Storrs Fry (1767–1835) and his brothers included the judge Edward Fry (1827–1918) and politician Lewis Fry (1832–1921).

He assumed control of the company as chairman in 1878 and built it up from 56 workers to a factory employing 3,000 people in Union Street, Bristol. He never married and his fortune was mostly inherited by his 37 nephews and nieces including Roger Fry, Joan Mary Fry, Margery Fry, and Ruth Fry (though £42,000 was split amongst employees with more than 5 years of service amongst other legacies). Control of the family firm passed to various relations, not all of whom were on speaking terms with each other, who thereafter merged it with Cadburys in 1919.

Joseph Storrs Fry was also clerk for the Society of Friends London Yearly Meeting for 1870–1875 and 1881–1889. He was a representative at the American meeting proposing the 1887 Richmond Declaration of Faith and clerk of the 1888 London Yearly Meeting that decided neither to endorse or reject it.
