= Martin Ferguson Smith =

British scholar and author

Front Cover of Martin the Epicurean, autobiography of Martin Ferguson Smith.

Martin Ferguson Smith, OBE, FRGS, FRHistS, FSA (born 26 April 1940, Birmingham, England) is a British scholar and writer.

After education at Shrewsbury School (1953–1958) he proceeded to Trinity College, Dublin (1958–1963), where he was a Foundation Scholar in Classics and won several academic prizes, including the Tyrrell Memorial Gold Medal for Greek and Latin verse and prose composition (1960). After gaining First Class Honours and a Moderatorship Prize (1962), he carried out postgraduate research under Donald Ernest Wilson Wormell for a thesis entitled "Lucretius: The Man and His Mission" (MLitt, Dublin, 1965).

From 1963 to 1988 Smith taught Classics at the University College of North Wales, Bangor (now Bangor University), from 1977 as professor. From 1988 he was Professor of Classics at Durham University. Problems with his eyesight compelled him to take early retirement from university teaching in 1995. He continues to be associated with Durham University as Professor Emeritus in the Department of Classics and Ancient History.

Smith married Elizabeth Mary Dempsey (1935–1997) of Dublin on 4 April 1964. The marriage was dissolved in 1981. He has a daughter and a granddaughter. Since 1995 he has lived on the remote and rugged island of Foula in Shetland. In "retirement" he has continued to be very active in research and writing, not only on classical subjects, but also on modern ones. In 2007 he was appointed an Officer of the Order of the British Empire (OBE) "for services to scholarship".

== Research ==
As a classical scholar, Smith has an international reputation for his work on two writers who made it their business to expound the doctrines of the Greek philosopher Epicurus.

One is the Roman poet Lucretius (c.98–c.55 BC), author of De Rerum Natura (On the Nature of Things). Smith's translation of the six-book work was first published in England in 1969 and reissued, with revisions, in the United States in 2001. He is also the editor of the Loeb Classical Library text of the poem, accompanied with an introduction, critical and explanatory notes, bibliography, and index, and with the translation of W. H. D. Rouse (1924) revised to make it accord with the new text.

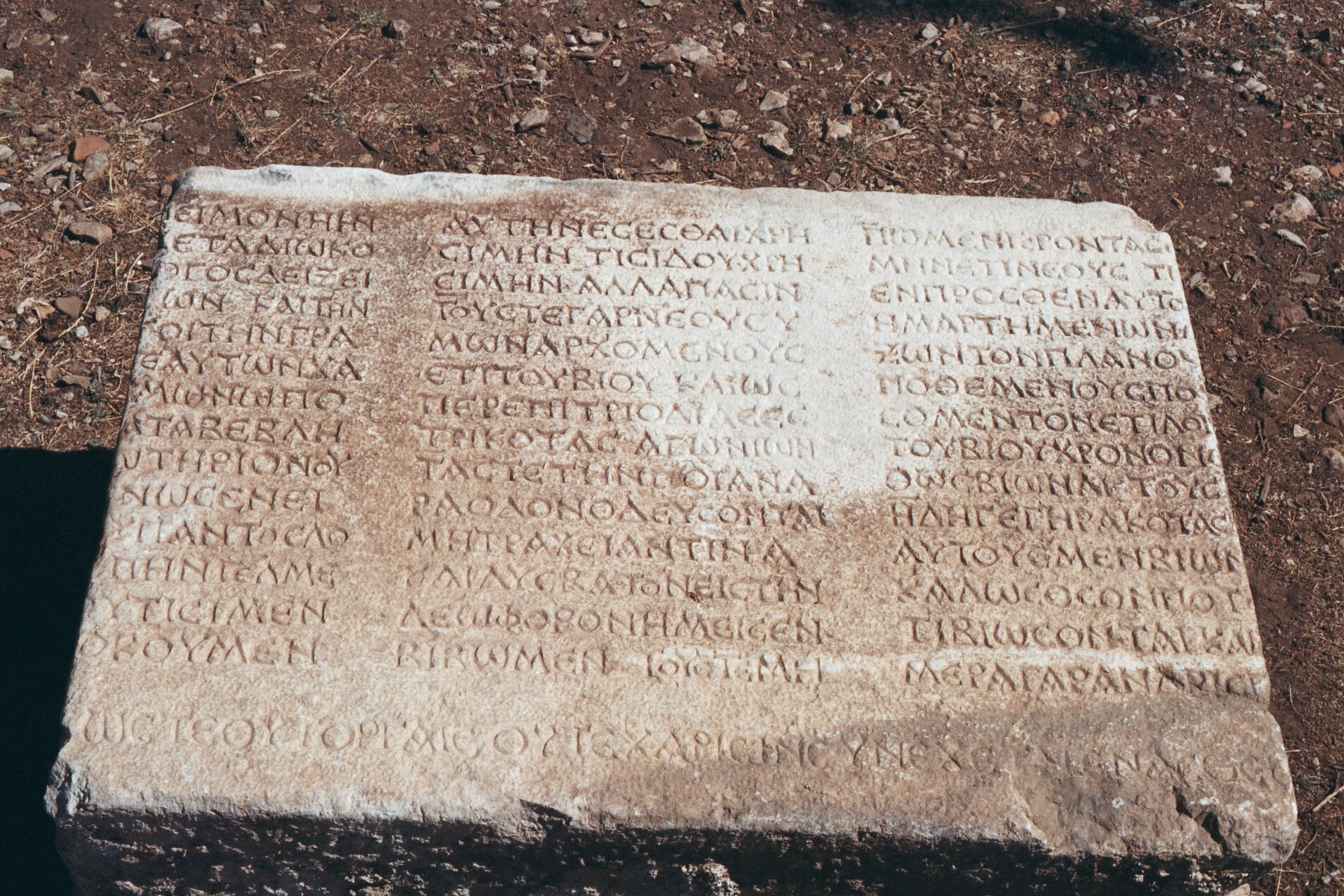
A block of the philosophical inscription of Diogenes of Oinoanda, recorded in 2012. The text (New Fragment 207) is part of the preface to his Ethics.

The other author is Diogenes of Oinoanda, who, probably early in the second century AD, presented his exposition of Epicurean philosophy in a Greek inscription carved on the wall of a stoa (colonnade) in the centre of his home-city in northern Lycia, in the mountains of southwest Asia Minor (Turkey). The inscription, which may have occupied 260 square metres of wall-space and contained about 25,000 words, is the longest known from the ancient world. The wall that carried the inscription fell down or (more likely) was deliberately demolished in later antiquity, and its blocks were reused as building material in various parts of the city. 88 pieces of the inscription were discovered by French and Austrian epigraphists between 1884 and 1895, but many decades of inactivity followed. In 1968 Smith inaugurated a long series of new investigations at Oinoanda that have now continued for half a century and much more than tripled the number of known fragments of one of the most remarkable documents to have survived from the ancient world. The latest tally (October 2017) is 305. Smith worked first by himself (1968–1973), then in collaboration with the British Institute of Archaeology at Ankara (1974–2003), and most recently (from 2007) with international teams led, until his early death in 2016, by Martin Bachmann, vice-director of the German Archaeological Institute in Istanbul. In this third phase Smith has worked in very close collaboration, both on and off the site, with Jürgen Hammerstaedt of the University of Cologne.

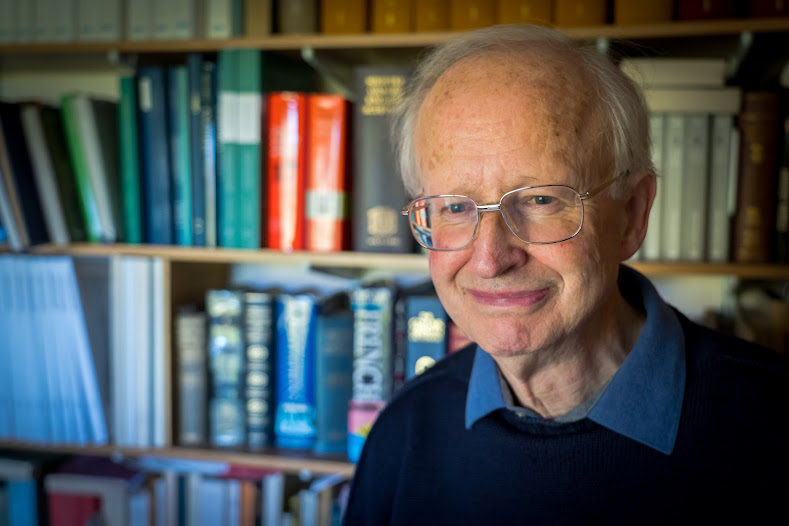
A portrait of Martin Ferguson Smith in his study on the Scottish island of Foula.

Smith has published his work on Diogenes' inscription in six books and nearly ninety articles. His latest book, Urbi et Orbi, containing a translation, with introduction and notes, was published in 2026. The book published in 2014 and nine articles in the journal Epigraphica Anatolica (2007–2012, 2016, 2018, 2022) were co-authored with Jürgen Hammerstaedt.

A documentary film, A Gigantic Jigsaw Puzzle: The Epicurean Inscription of Diogenes of Oinanda, directed by Nazim Güveloğlu was released in 2015.

Since 2010, Smith, while continuing his involvement with classical studies and especially Diogenes of Oinoanda, has also written on modern cultural figures and social reformers. These include the writers Rose Macaulay, Virginia Woolf, Dorothy L. Sayers, and Katharine Tynan; the artists Roger Fry, Helen Coombe, and Tristram Hillier; the art critic Clive Bell; Mary Louisa Gordon, first female Inspector of Prisons in England and Wales and ardent supporter of the suffragettes; the trade unionist and judicial reformer Madeleine Symons, and Richard Williams Reynolds, schoolteacher of J. R. R. Tolkien, revealing Reynolds to be the unacknowledged son of a Confederate commander from Arkansas in the American Civil War.

Smith's most recent "modern" books are In and out of Bloomsbury: Biographical Essays on Twentieth-Century Writers and Artists, The Artist Helen Coombe (1864-1937): The Tragedy of Roger Fry's Wife, and the autobiographical Martin the Epicurean.

== Elections and awards (selection) ==
- Fellow of the Society of Antiquaries of London (FSA), 3 March 1975 – present. Life Fellow 2026-
- Leverhulme Research Fellow, 1987–1988
- Member of the Council of Management, British Institute of Archaeology at Ankara, 1987–1994
- Member of the Asia Minor Commission (Kleinasiatische Kommission), Austrian Academy of Sciences, 1990–2007
- Awarded the degree of Doctor in Letters (LittD) by the University of Dublin, 1993
- Awarded the International Theodor Mommsen Prize for Herculaneum Papyrology, Pozzuoli, Italy, 2004
- Appointed Officer of the Order of the British Empire (OBE) in the Civil Division, 17 June 2007
- Fellow of the Royal Geographical Society (FRGS), 2016–
- Fellow of the Royal Historical Society (FRHistS), 2018–
- Corresponding Member of the German Archaeological Institute (Deutsches Archäologisches Institut), 2020–

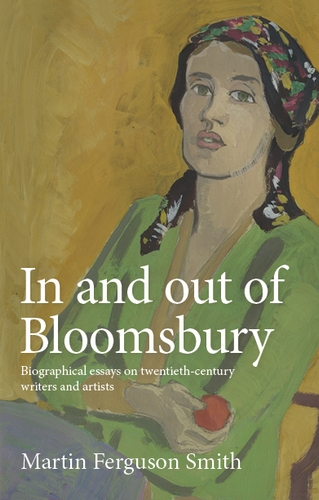
This is the front cover art for the book In and out of Bloomsbury written by Martin Ferguson Smith.

== Publications (selection) ==
- Lucretius: On the Nature of Things. London: Sphere Books, 1969.
- Lucretius: De Rerum Natura. With an English translation by W. H. D. Rouse, revised by Martin Ferguson Smith. Cambridge MA/London: Harvard University Press, 1975, 1982, 1992 (Loeb Classical Library 181). ISBN 0-674-99200-8.
- Lucretius: On the Nature of Things. Indianapolis/Cambridge MA: Hackett, 2001.ISBN 0-87220-588-6 (cloth), ISBN 0-87220-587-8 (paperback).
- Classics in Albania. Ilford: The Albanian Society, 1984.
- Diogenes of Oinoanda: The Epicurean Inscription (La scuola di Epicuro, Supplemento 1). Naples: Bibliopolis, 1993. ISBN 88-7088-270-5.
- The Philosophical Inscription of Diogenes of Oinoanda (Ergänzungsbände zu den Tituli Asiae Minoris 20). Wien: Österreichische Akademie der Wissenschaften, 1996. ISBN 3-7001-2596-8.
- "Excavations at Oinoanda 1997: The New Epicurean Texts", Anatolian Studies 48 (1998), 125–170.
- Supplement to Diogenes of Oinoanda: The Epicurean Inscription (La scuola di Epicuro, Supplemento 3). Naples: Bibliopolis, 2003. ISBN 88-7088-441-4.
- Jürgen Hammerstaedt & Martin Ferguson Smith, The Epicurean Inscription of Diogenes of Oinoanda: Ten Years of New Discoveries and Research. Rudolf Habelt, Bonn, 2014. ISBN 978-3-7749-3927-1.
- Dearest Jean: Rose Macaulay’s Letters to a Cousin. Manchester University Press, Manchester, 2011. ISBN 978-0-7190-8521-5 (hardback). Reissued with minor revisions 2017. ISBN 978-1-5261-2300-8 (paperback).
- "Dorothy L. Sayers and the Somersham Pageant of 1908", Seven: An Anglo-American Literary Review 28 (2011), 79–96.
- "Virginia Woolf’s Second Visit to Greece", English Studies 92 (2011), 55–83.
- "'Suicidal Mania' and Flawed Psychobiography: Two Discussions of Virginia Woolf", English Studies 95 (2014), 538–556.
- "Virginia Woolf and 'The Hermaphrodite': A Feminist Fan of Orlando and Critic of Roger Fry", English Studies 97 (2016), 277–297.
- "'New' Portraits by Roger Fry (1866–1934) of Helen Fry and Vanessa Bell", The British Art Journal 17, no. 3 (Spring 2017), 34–39.
- "The British Connection: The Secret Son of Brig. Gen. Daniel Harris Reynolds", Arkansas Historical Quarterly 76, no. 2 (Summer 2017), 144–176.
- Madeleine Symons, Social and Penal Reformer (Bristol: SilverWood Books, 2017). ISBN 978-1-78132-719-7 (paperback), ISBN 978-1-78132-748-7 (ebook).
- "Letters from Rose Macaulay to Katharine Tynan", English Studies 99 (2018) 517–537. doi:10.1080/0013838X.2018.1483621
- Jürgen Hammerstaedt & Martin Ferguson Smith, "Diogenes of Oinoanda: The New and Unexpected Discoveries of 2017 (NF 214–219), With a Re-edition of Fr. 70–72", Epigraphica Anatolica 51 (2018), 43–79.
- "The First Visit of Tristram Hillier (1905–1983) to Portugal", The British Art Journal 20, no. 1 (Spring/Summer 2019), 90–97.
- Martin Ferguson Smith & Helen Walasek, "Clive Bell’s Memoir of Annie Raven-Hill", English Studies 100 (2019), 823–854.
- "A Complete Strip-off: A Bloomsbury Threesome in the Nude at Studland", The British Art Journal 20, no. 2 (Autumn 2019), 72–77.
- "Fifty Years of New Epicurean Discoveries at Oinoanda", Cronache Ercolanesi 50 (2020), 241–258.
- "The Royal Academy of Arts Students’ Clubs, 1883-1902", The British Art Journal 22, no. 1 (Spring 2021), 78-88.
- In and Out of Bloomsbury: Biographical Essays on Twentieth-Century Writers and Artists, Manchester University Press, Manchester, 2021. ISBN 978-1-5261-5744-7 (hardback), 978-1-5261-5743-0 (ebook), 978-1-5261-7193-1 (paperback, issued 2023).
- "Pandemics, Plagues, and Philosophy: Moral Lessons from Antiquity for the Modern World”, Antigone [online classical journal], January 2022. https://antigonejournal.com/2022/01/pandemic-philosophy/
- The Artist Helen Coombe (1864-1937): The Tragedy of Roger Fry’s Wife. Paul Holberton Publishing for Hogarth Arts Ltd, London, 2023. ISBN 978-1-913645-53-3
- “The Stephen and Macaulay Families: Two New Letters”, Virginia Woolf Bulletin 75, January 2024, 28-39.
- “Diogenes of Oinoanda Fr. 65 + Fr. 78: A Join Enabled by Digital Models”, Epigraphica Anatolica 55 (2022), 121-129. With Jürgen Hammerstaedt.
- Urbi et Orbi: The Epicurean Inscription and Prescription of Diogenes of Oinoanda, tab edizioni, Rome, 2026, ISBN 979-12-5669-344-3 paperback; also (Open Access).
- Martin the Epicurean, SilverWood, Bristol, 2026, ISBN 978-1-80042-324-4 paperback; also ebook.
