= Agnes Fry =

English writer and bryologist (1868–1957)

- Image from a Fry family album
- Born: 25 March 1869; Highgate
- Died: 15 August 1958 (aged 89)
- Occupations: Writer, bryologist
- Father: Sir Edward Fry
- Relatives: Joan Mary Fry, Roger Eliot Fry, Isabel Fry, Margery Fry, Ruth Fry

Agnes Fry FRAS (25 March 1869 - 15 August 1958) was a British bryologist, astronomer, botanical illustrator, writer and poet, who donated Failand House's Estate to the National Trust.

== Family ==
Fry was born on 25 March 1869, in Highgate. Her father was Sir Edward Fry, the jurist, and the family were prominent Quakers connected to Fry's Chocolate. One of nine children, Fry had two brothers and six sisters:

- Edward Portsmouth Fry (1860–1928)
- Mariabella Fry (1861–1920)
- Joan Mary Fry (1862–1955) Quaker social reformer
- Elizabeth Alice Fry (1864–1868)
- Roger Eliot Fry (1866–1934) – Artist, member of the Bloomsbury Group
- Her twin sister Isabel Fry (1869–1958), educator
- (Sara) Margery Fry (1874–1958) – penal reformer, principal of Somerville College (1926–1931), founder of the Howard League
- (Anna) Ruth Fry (1878–1962) – pacifist and Quaker activist

In his diaries Ernest Satow recorded that of Edward Fry's daughters, Agnes was "the deaf but interesting and learned one".

== Research ==
=== Botany ===
Edward Fry encouraged the education of his daughters, in particular he encouraged an interest in natural sciences. Fry collaborated with her father on several scientific works, including the botanical illustrations for British Mosses. They co-authored The Mycetozoa, published in 1899, which ran to a second edition in 1915. In his introduction to The Liverworts he praised her "zealous cooperation" in their research. She collected a large number of specimens, in particular from the family's estate at Failand. Specimens she collected there included: Physarum viride, Fuligo septica, Chondrioderma spumarioides, Lamproderma irideum and Dictydium umbilicatum. She was an early member of the British Mycological Society. She was also a member of the Bristol Naturalists' Society.

=== Astronomy ===
Agnes Fry was an amateur astronomer, joining the British Astronomical Association on 29 November 1905. She was elected a fellow of the Royal Astronomical Society on 14 February 1919 on the recommendation of W F Denning.

=== Textiles ===
Fry was also a collector of embroidery, particularly that produced by 'peasant' communities from around the world. In 1949 she donated her collection of 260 pieces to Bristol Museum. Her friends and relatives donated pieces to the collection, and she also commissioned pieces from local craftspeople through her network of acquaintances. When she donated the collection the also gave £50 to fund its display, which she stipulated should have "good illumination as needlework requires narrow inspection".

=== Correspondence with the Eugenics Society ===
Fry was a member of the Eugenics Society and corresponded with them, in particular around the question of how to prevent people with disabilities from marrying.

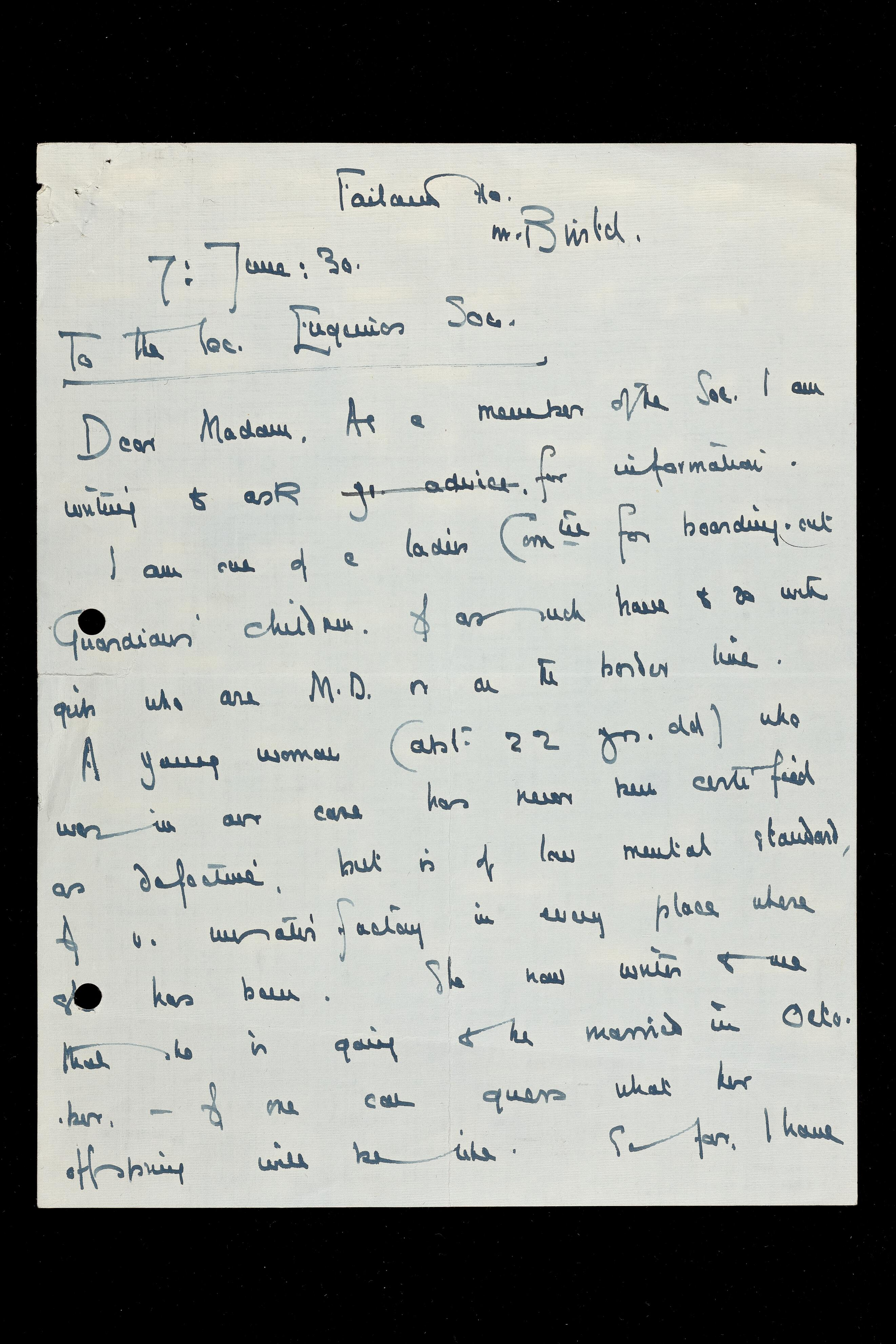
Letter to Eugenics Society enquiring about preventing a disabled woman from marrying, p. 1 (Wellcome Collection)

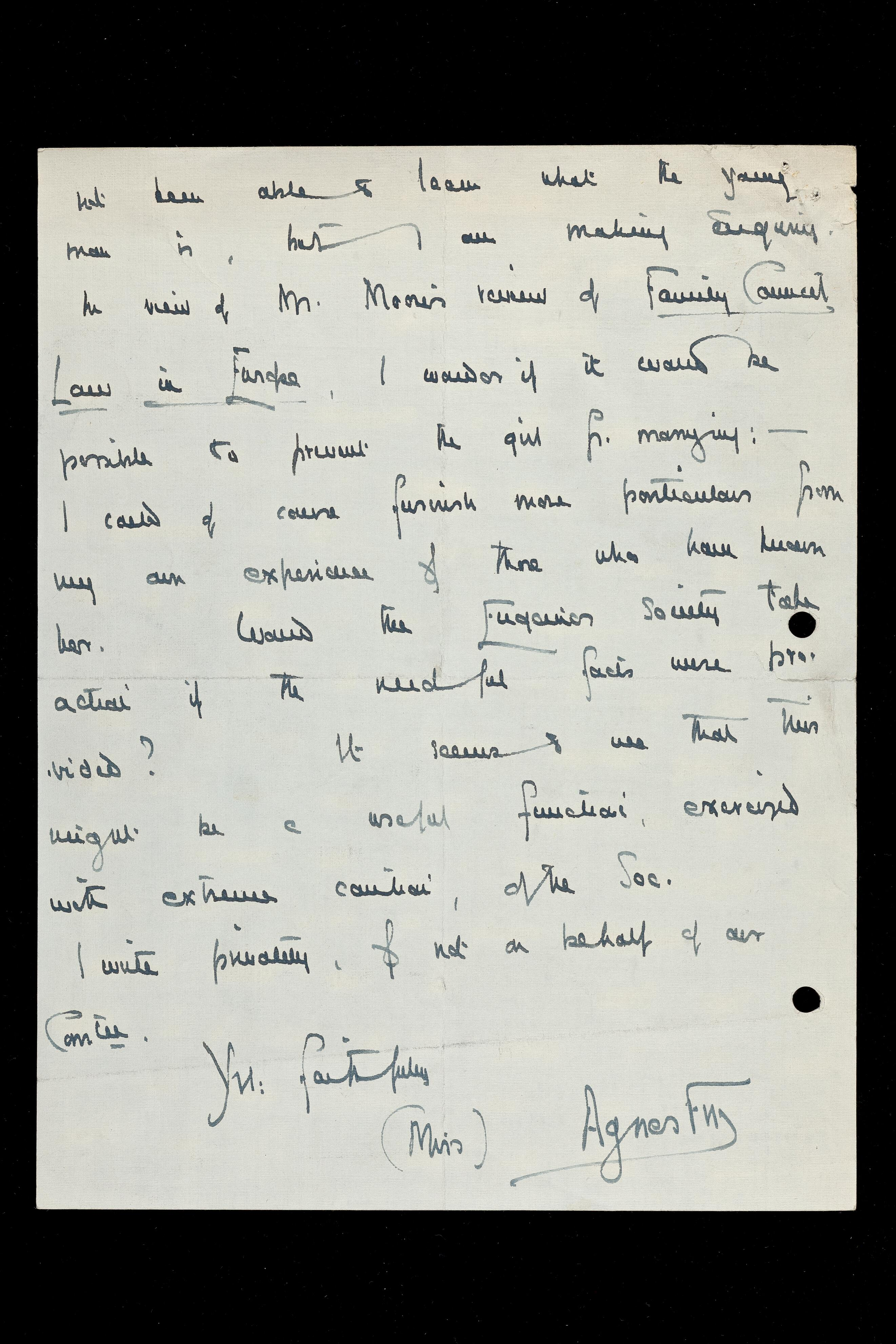
Letter to Eugenics Society enquiring about preventing a disabled woman from marrying, p. 2 (Wellcome Collection)

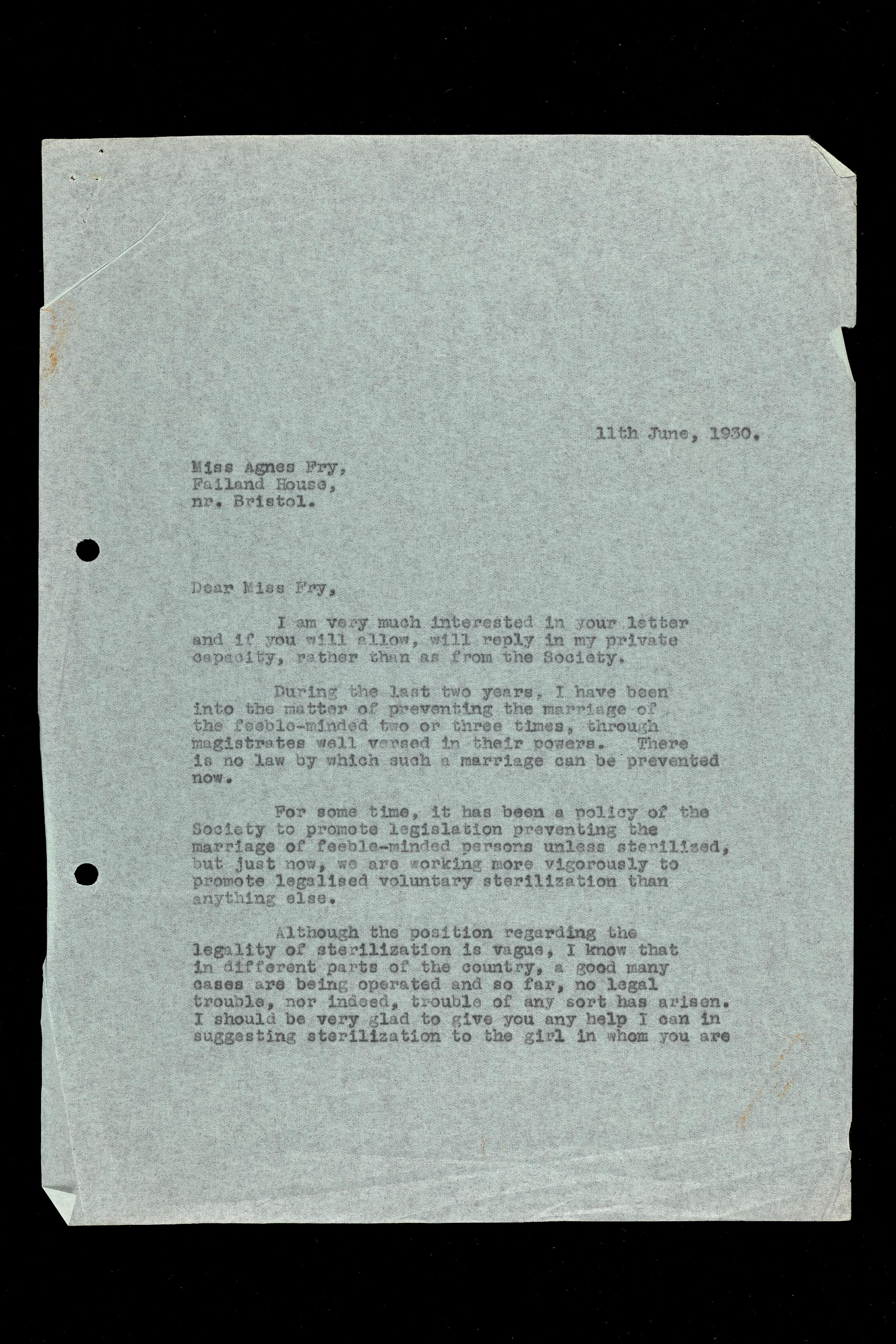
Reply to Agnes Fry suggesting sterilisation as a course of action, p. 1 (Wellcome Collection)

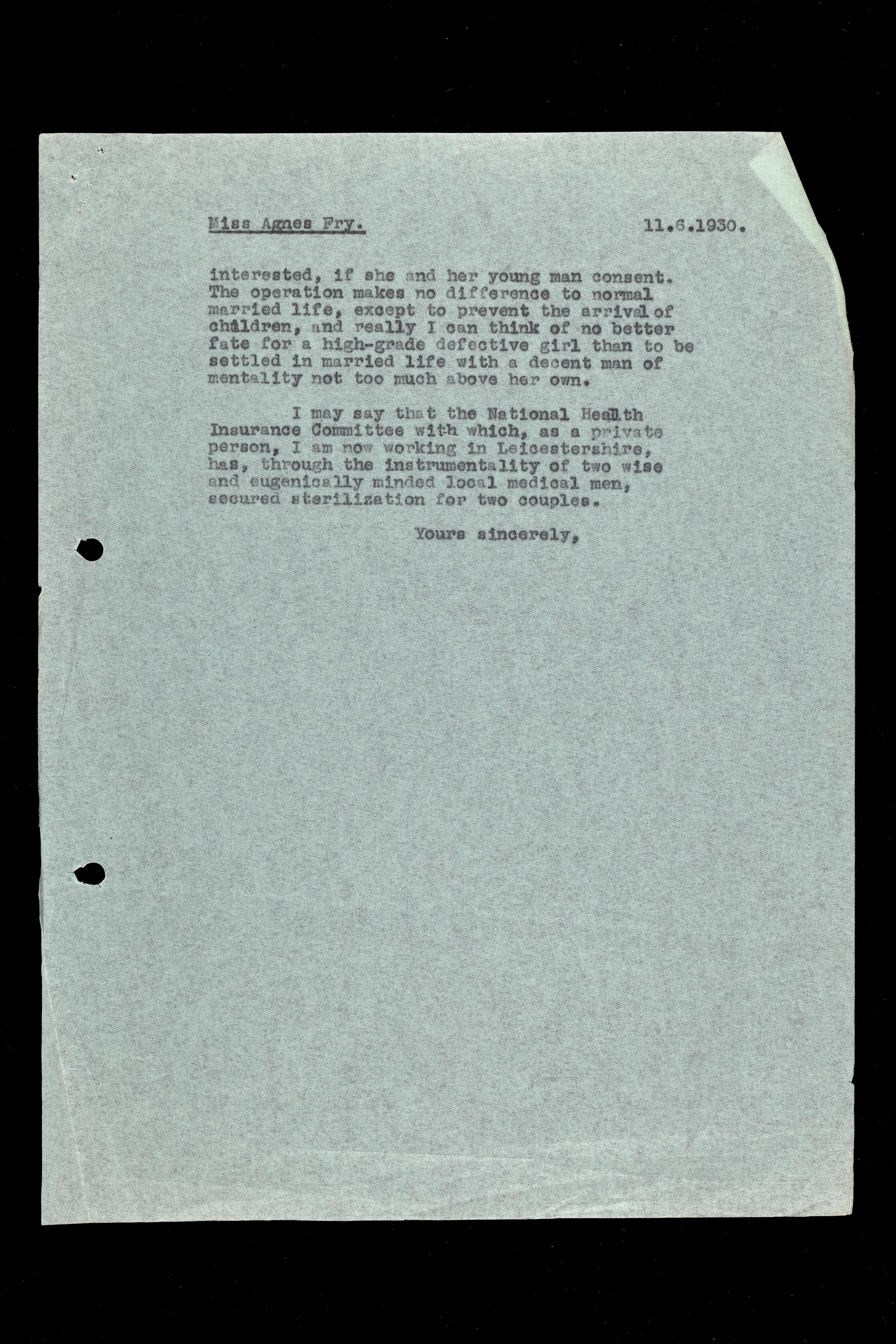
Reply to Agnes Fry suggesting sterilisation as a course of action, p. 1 (Wellcome Collection)

== Later life ==
From the 1930s, Fry lived at Home Farm on the Failand Estate. She planted two oak trees there: the first to commemorate the silver jubilee of George V and Queen Mary (in 1935); the second to mark the coronation of George VI (in 1937). In 1958 the 393 acre Failand House Estate was donated to the National Trust. The house had been the Fry family's summer home. Fry died on 15 August 1958.

== Selected publications ==
=== Memoir ===
- A memoir of the Right Honourable Sir Edward Fry, G.C.B. (Oxford University Press, 1921).

=== Bryology ===
- The Liverworts: British and Foreign (Witherby & Company, 1911).
- 'Pwdre Ser.' Nature (1910).
- The Mycetozoa and some questions which they suggest (Knowledge Office, 1899).
- 'Position of Boughs in Summer and Winter' Nature (1896).

=== Astronomy ===
• Model of the Solar System, JBAA 19 (1908), p. 21

• Correspondence: A Hanging Sundial, JBAA 19 (1909), p. 404

• Correspondence: Iridescent Colours on Clouds, JBAA 25 (1914), p. 101

• The Green Flash, JBAA 39 (1928), p. 61 & 39 (1929), p. 167

• The Illumination of the Dark side of Venus, JBAA 44 (1934), p. 284

• The Precious Things put Forth by the Moon, JBAA 51 (1941), p. 319

=== Poetry ===
- Stars and Constellations: A Little Guide to the Sky (J Baker & Son, 1911).
- Winter Sunshine & Other Verses (Orphan's Printing Press, 1929).
