= Helen Coombe =

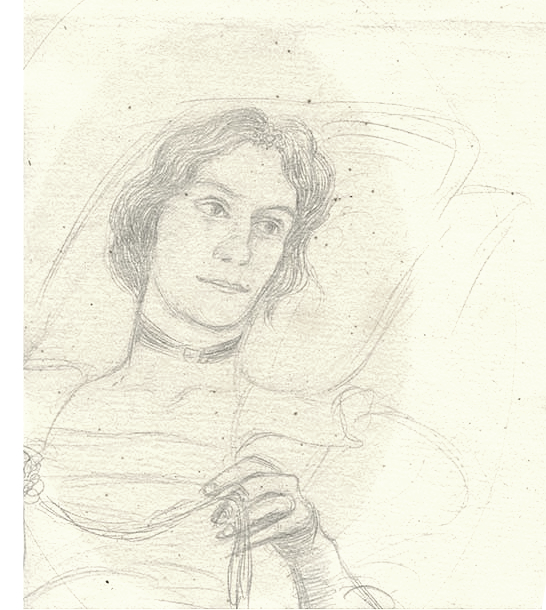
- Wedding day portrait of Helen Coombe by her husband Roger Fry
- Born: 1864
- Died: 1937 (aged 72–73)
- Other name: Helen Fry
- Occupations: painter, decorative artist
- Spouse: Roger Fry

Helen Coombe (1864–1937), known after her 1896 marriage to Roger Fry as Helen Fry, was a British artist. She was a painter and a decorative artist in the Arts & Crafts style.

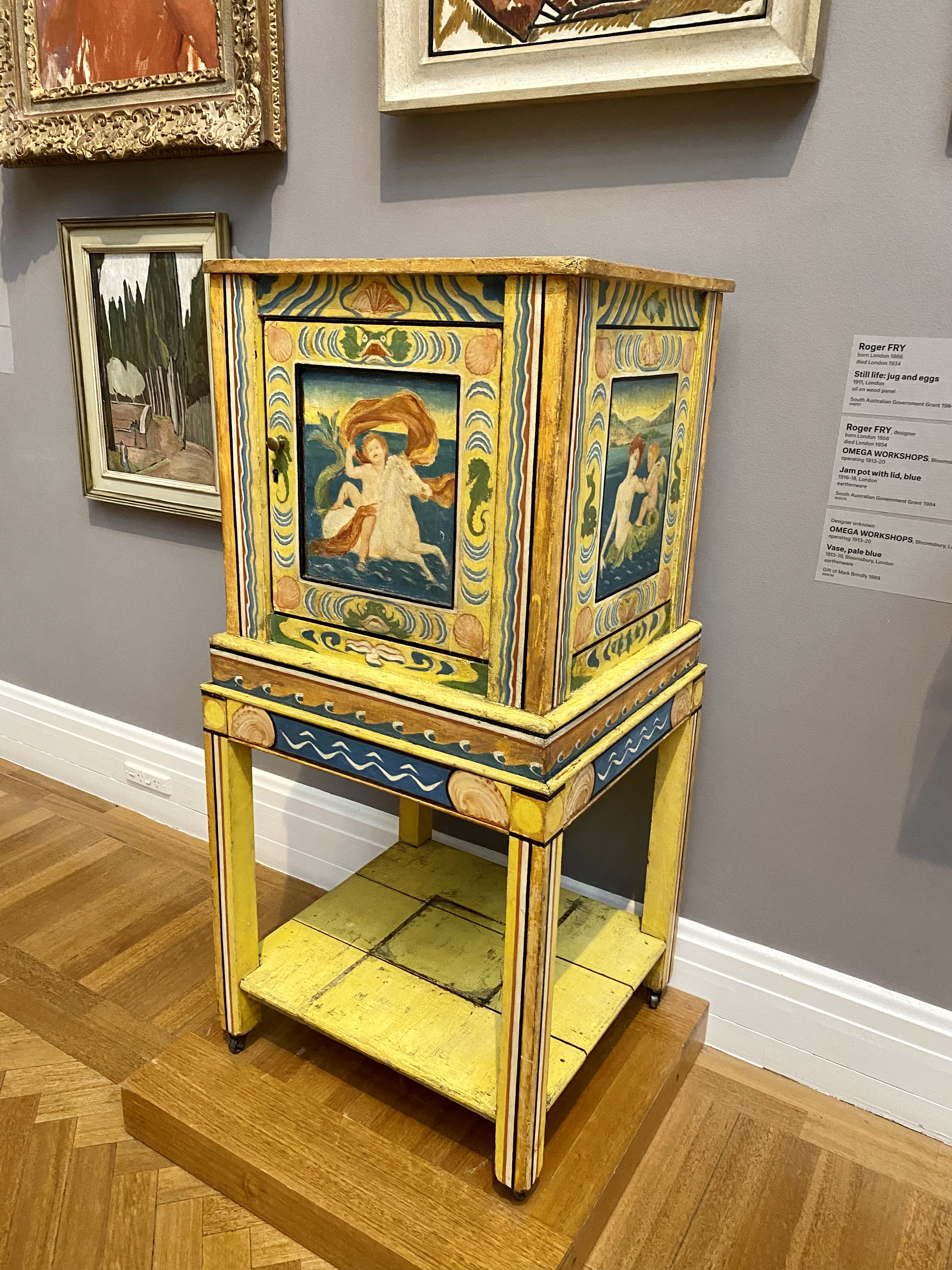
The Trevelyan cabinet, decorated by Coombe, at the Art Gallery of South Australia.

== Early life and background ==
She was the eighth of the 12 children of the corn merchant Joseph Coombe of Waterford, who married in 1853 Laura Beaumont Russell, daughter of the surgeon George Ireland Russell of Milton-next-Gravesend, Kent; the surgeon Russell Coombe (1855–1933) was her elder brother. She was born in Lee, Kent.

== Art student ==
Coombe in 1881 went to St John's Wood Art School, moving on to the Royal Academy Schools in 1882. Later she attended the National Art Training School. She associated with the circle around Century Guild of Artists, a small group founded by Arthur Heygate Mackmurdo, based in London at 20 Fitzroy Square. This was by 1889, when she attended an event at 20 Fitzroy Square, with Selwyn Image and ten others. Selwyn Image designed stained glass, and for the furniture of the Guild decorative panels. For Coombe, who studied with him, he was a mentor.

At some time in her student days, at earliest in 1886, Coombe met and befriended Mary Gordon. On Gordon's authority, Martin Ferguson Smith believes that Coombe spent a student year in Paris, in the period 1891 to 1894; she returned malnourished, according to Gordon, who qualified as a physician in 1890. Smith suggests she might have studied at the Académie Colarossi, or the Académie Julian, or both.

== Artist with studio ==
Coombe's productive period starting in 1895 saw her with a London studio off Fitzroy Square, at 27 Southampton Street, an address now in Conway Street. She worked also in Haslemere, Surrey, where Arnold Dolmetsch had his musical instrument workshop.

== Married woman ==
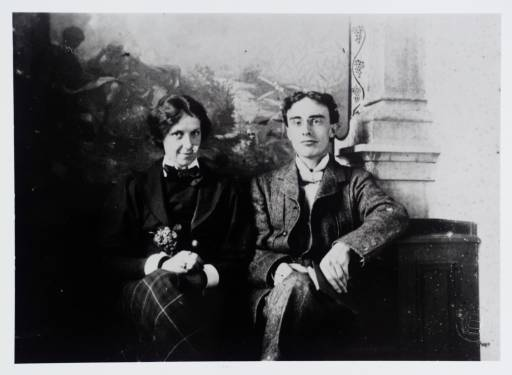
Helen with Roger Fry, photograph c.1897

At the period from late 1901 when W. B. Yeats was promoting performances inspired by Florence Farr as "chaunting", accompanied by a psaltery, he favoured the three-musician chorus. Helen Fry was part of a group trained in this form of declamation, with Isabel Fry and Elizabeth Trevelyan née van der Hoeven, wife of R. C. Trevelyan.

Helen Fry suffered from deteriorating mental health, and had Henry Head as consultant. She was hospitalised for treatment at The Priory in 1907 and 1909. In 1910 she was admitted to The Retreat, York, where she spent the rest of her life. She died there, an autopsy revealing a thickening of the skull to which her illness was attributed.

== Family ==
Coombe married Roger Fry on 3 December 1896 at the Priory Church of St Bartholomew the Great in London. They had been introduced in 1895 by R. C. Trevelyan, who shared lodgings with Roger. Informed of their engagement in July 1896, Roger's father Edward Fry and mother had serious reservations about the match, including questions about Helen's background, and her financial situation in the light of their current financial support of Roger. These issues took a month to resolve.

The couple had a son and a daughter. The son Julian Edward Fry (1901–1984) emigrated to Canada in 1923 and became a cattle rancher. The daughter (Agnes) Pamela Fry (1902–1985) married in 1923 the artist Avram "Micu" Diamand.

== Works ==
Coombe gained presumed painting commissions through associations with the Church of Humanity in Chapel Street, Belgravia. She painted her friend Lucy Crompton, wife of Henry Crompton (this portrait is not known to be extant). Her copy of a work from the workshop of Botticelli, The Virgin and Child with Saint John and an Angel, now in the Herbert Gallery, was done for Emily Geddes, widow of James Cruickshank Geddes of the Calcutta Positivist Society, and sister-in-law of Richard Congreve, the Church's founder.

An art student perhaps until 1895, Coombe exhibited at the New English Art Club. Another portrait was of Hubert Crackanthorpe, also a pupil of Selwyn Image. She designed a stained-glass window on the subject of Martha and Mary, for St John the Evangelist Church, High Cross, East Hertfordshire. The model for Mary was Alice Knewstub, daughter of the artist Walter John Knewstub and future wife of William Rothenstein; and the model for Martha was May Morris.

A harpsichord by Arnold Dolmetsch and decorated by Coombe was shown at the 5th exhibition in 1896 of the Arts and Crafts Exhibition Society, and was "the most popular item". Coombe painted the inside of the lid, using her own designs, while Herbert Horne added a design above the keyboard, and Selwyn Image the lettering. For the design, she consulted Roger Fry, who gave her substantive help with the roundels filled out as medallions, as she worked to a deadline in summer 1896. The instrument is now in the Horniman Museum.

Three years later, another Dolmetsch keyboard, a clavichord, was signed "Helen Fry pinxit 1899". It was one of three smaller, pentagonal instruments made in golden pine, and was given as a wedding present to R. C. Trevelyan, married in 1900. It was exhibited in the 6th Arts and Crafts exhibition in 1899, and at the Prima Esposizione Internazionale d'Arte Decorativa Moderna in 1902. The Trevelyan cabinet (c.1900), designed by Roger Fry and now in the Art Gallery of South Australia, was decorated by Helen.

Tancred Borenius later praised Helen Fry's potential as a painter.
