= Mary Gordon (prison inspector) =

British physician, prison inspector and writer (1861–1941)

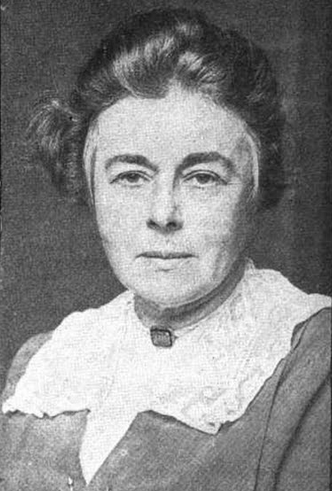
- Mary Louisa Gordon, from a 1920 publication
- Born: Mary Louisa Gordon; 15 August 1861; Seaforth, Lancashire, England
- Died: 5 May 1941 (aged 79); Crowborough, Sussex, England
- Occupations: Physician, prison inspector and author
- Known for: First British female prison inspector
- Notable work: Penal Discipline (1922); Chase of the Wild Goose (1936)

Mary Louisa Gordon (15 August 1861 − 5 May 1941) was a British physician, prison inspector and writer. After graduating from the London School of Medicine for Women in 1890, Gordon worked at the East London Hospital for Children, the Evelina London Children's Hospital, and later had a private practice in Harley Street. While working as a physician, she made a number of public addresses and wrote publications on topics including the effects of prostitution and alcohol dependence on women.

Gordon was appointed as the first British female prison inspector in 1908. During her time as prison inspector, she enacted a number of improvements including prison work allocation. She also supported the British suffragette movement, and secretly communicated with the Women's Social and Political Union about conditions in prisons. After retirement in 1921, she wrote the book Penal Discipline (1922), which advocated for reforms to the prison system, and the historical novel Chase of the Wild Goose (1936), based on the Ladies of Llangollen.

== Early life ==
Gordon was born on 15 August 1861 in Seaforth, Lancashire, to James Gordon and his second wife Mary Emily Carter. Her father sold hide and tallow. She had six sisters and three brothers. Gordon also had an older stepsister and stepbrother, their mother Anne Barnsley Shaw had died from consumption in 1855. Gordon studied at the London School of Medicine for Women, and qualified as a doctor with the Triple Qualification in 1890.

== Career ==
=== Physician ===
After graduation, she worked part-time as the librarian and curator of the school. She later worked as a clinical assistant at the East London Hospital for Children and at the Evelina London Children's Hospital. Gordon joined the Association of Registered Medical Women (ARMW), a precursor to the Medical Women's Federation, in 1891. She also later worked as a physician in Harley Street, London.

During this time, she contributed a number of publications and public addresses regarding a variety of topics including the effects of sexually transmitted diseases (STDs), prostitution, and alcohol dependence on women. This included writing a letter which had been signed by 73 members of the ARMW in 1898 to Lord George Hamilton, the Secretary of State for India, to criticise measures enacted in the previous year to combat the spread of STDs in the British Army stationed there. The measures included the mandatory medical examinations of women suspected of carrying an STD living near a military building, if they refused they would be expelled from their homes. (Note: For context, see the Contagious Diseases Acts, which had been repealed in Britain in 1886, and Prostitution in colonial India.)

=== Prison reformer ===
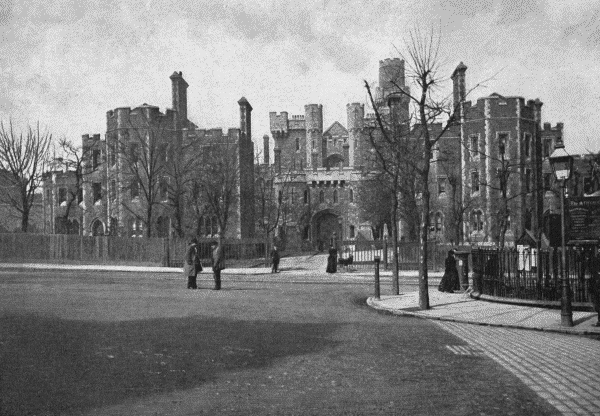
HM Prison Holloway in 1897

In March 1908, Gordon was appointed as a prison inspector. She was the first woman to hold the position. Her role involved the inspection of the female wings of 47 prisons, and the training of female prison officers. She had no formal training prior to being appointed therefore Gordon visited prisons in Europe in order to learn the best practice. She soon identified that the majority of female prisoners had short sentences with high rates of recidivism. Gordon supported a rehabilitative approach in prisons to combat this. She organised the prison labour so that menial tasks such as cleaning were assigned to short-term inmates, while more productive roles were given to long-term inmates such as training for jobs when released. Gordon is also credited with physical improvements in conditions in British prisons, such as better lighting in jail cells with the use of clear glass in windows, and introducing notebooks to HM Prison Holloway. (Note: Most of the suffragettes imprisoned between 1905 and 1914 were sent to Holloway. They often secretly recorded their experiences in journals and diaries which allowed them to cope psychologically as well as highlight prison conditions.)

She was a supporter of the British suffragette movement, and secretly communicated with Emmeline Pethick-Lawrence and the Women's Social and Political Union (WSPU) about the state of prisons, and reached out to incarcerated leaders such as Emmeline Pankhurst. When the WSPU headquarters was raided by the police on 23 May 1914, this correspondence was discovered and she was asked by the Home Office to renounce her association with the movement, which she refused to do so. During the First World War, she served from July to December 1916 with the Scottish Women's Hospitals for Foreign Service in Macedonia. By the end of her career, she was marginalised and isolated for her association with the suffragette movement and her "feminist" approach to her role. When she asked for an increase in her salary in 1919, an official replied by describing her appointment as a "sop to feminism" and that any further increase would be "a concession to the claims of feminism". She retired in 1921.

=== Author ===
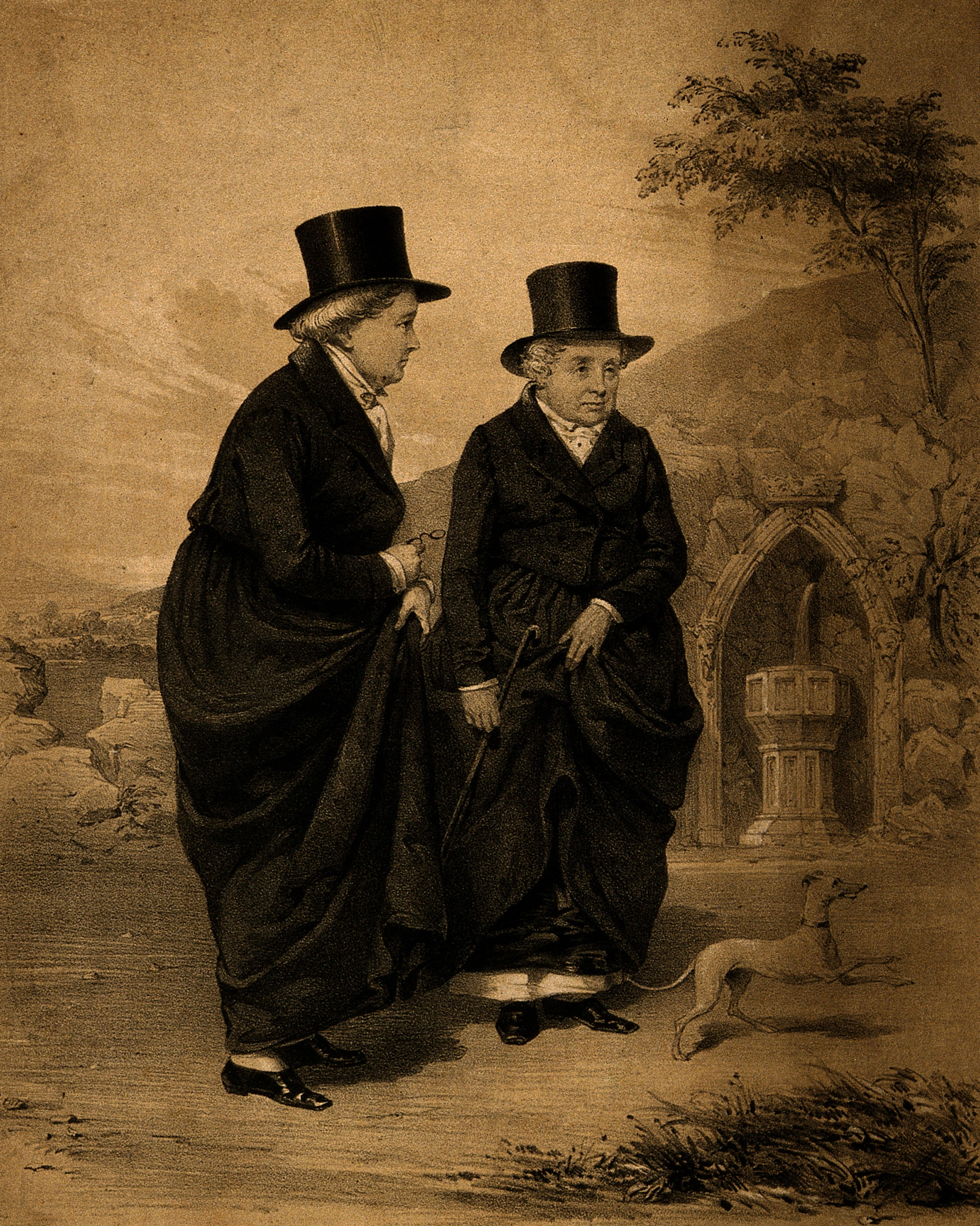
Gordon wrote a novel about the Ladies of Llangollen (pictured)

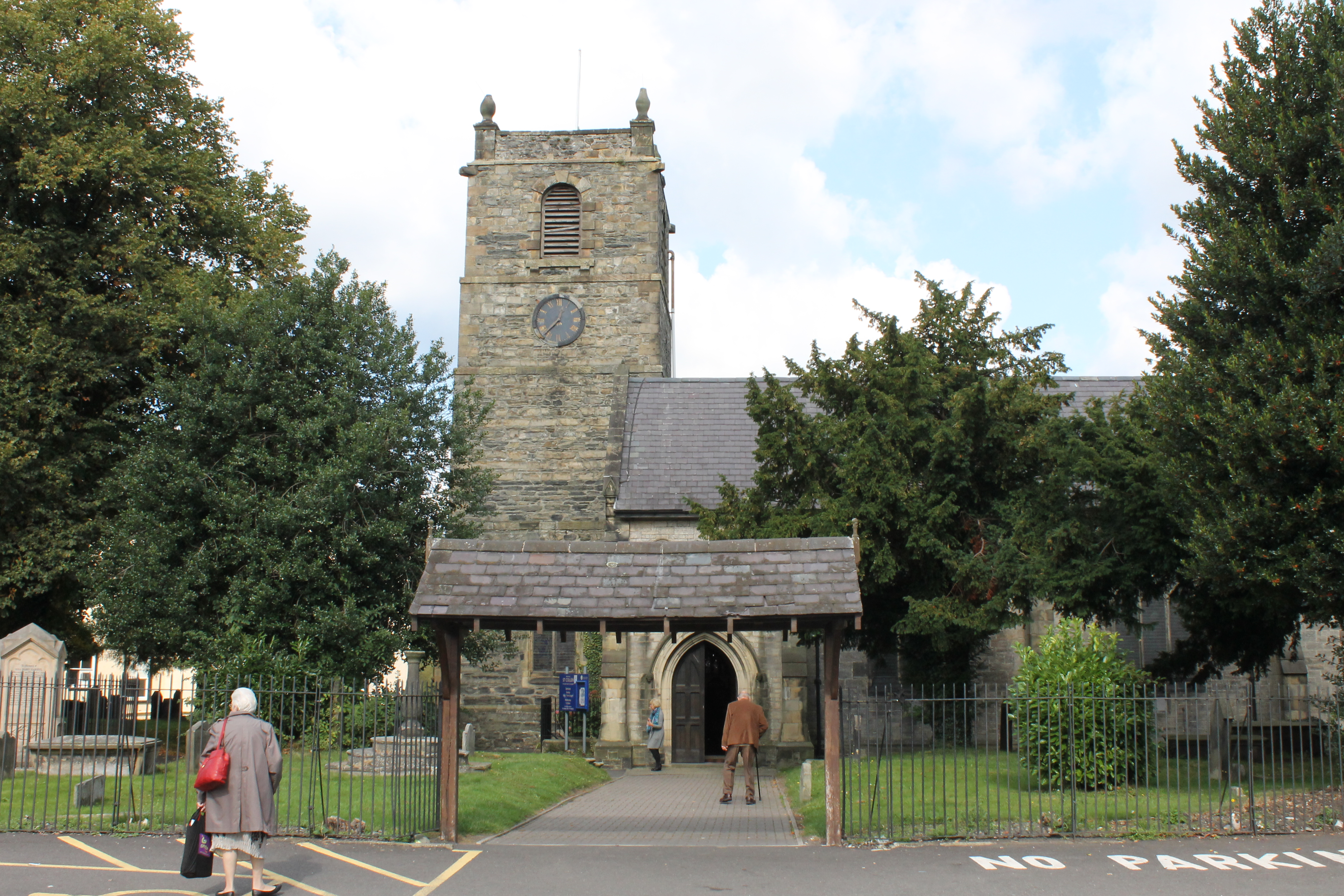
St Collen’s Church, Llangollen

Gordon wrote her first book in 1907 when she was a physician, a novel called A Jury of the Virtuous under the pseudonym of Patrick Hood. It was about a convicted forger called Richard Ransome who is released from prison at the age of 26, and finds it difficult to reintegrate into society. A review in the British Medical Journal commented that the characters were well-written particularly the convict, and that it taught an important moral, "let a man strive ever so hard to retrieve the social ruin entailed by crime that is found out, he can never, in the eyes of the world, live down his past". A reviewer for the literary magazine The Athenaeum also felt that the characters were well-written but criticised the "conventional happy ending".

The year after her retirement, Gordon wrote the book, Penal Discipline (1922), in which she advocated for reforms to the prison system. She felt that prisons were too focused on punishment and discipline, which encouraged recidivism. Gordon argued for more focus on rehabilitation which included seeking prisoners' views on what would prevent them from reoffending. On one occasion, she describes helping an inmate who was frequently arrested for stealing men's clothes. The inmate told her that "she felt it impossible to live as a woman, but could live as a man, and enjoyed men's work". Gordon provided her with men's clothing and a train fare to South Wales, where she obtained work as a coal miner. The former inmate later wrote to Gordon to inform her that in the year after her release, she was "living respectably", and had experienced her first Easter out of prison in ten years. A reviewer for The Guardian newspaper wrote that it was a "very humanly and brightly written book". A review in The New York Times praised Penal Discipline for its "vivid" description of conditions in British prisons and the "warmth and vigor" in which Gordon argued against the British prison system but felt that she was "idealistic". The book, along with Sidney and Beatrice Webb's report English Prisons Under Local Government and Stephen Hobhouse and Fenner Brockway's English Prisons Today, prompted calls for an inquiry into prison conditions. Initially this was thought likely as prison commissioners had recognised the need for reform, but after the 1922 general election, the new Home Secretary William Bridgeman decided against it.

In later life, Gordon studied analytical psychology with Carl Jung, and his wife Emma in Switzerland. In 1936, she wrote the historical novel Chase of the Wild Goose, based on the Ladies of Llangollen. The book, dedicated to Emma Jung, is split up into three parts. The first two parts cover the women's initial meeting and their time in Ireland and Wales. In the epilogue, she describes a meeting with the ghosts of the ladies in 1934 during a visit to Llangollen. It was published by writer Virginia Woolf, and her husband Leonard. A review in The Guardian praised Gordon for telling "their story with sensitiveness and understanding" but suggested that some readers would dislike the fantastical nature of the book's epilogue and her characterisation of the women as early examples of feminists. A year after the release of the book, Gordon installed a marble relief of the women at St Collen’s Church, Llangollen where they were buried.

Gordon was highly critical of Virginia Woolf's 1940 biography of artist Roger Fry, particularly in its portrayal of his wife, the artist Helen Coombe, who she was close friends with. She wrote a letter to Woolf describing her reservations about the book. Gordon felt that Coombe had been described in the book as "only the pitiful nebulous ghost she had to be" rather than the brave and charismatic woman that she knew from her youth. She also felt it did not discuss the potential contribution, from her point of view, of Fry's extroverted personality to the deterioration in Coombe's mental health in later life. It is not known whether Woolf replied to the letter but in previous brief references to Gordon in her writing she did not describe her with warm words.

== Death ==
Gordon died on 5 May 1941 in the town of Crowborough, Sussex, at the age of 79.

== Bibliography ==
- Bailey, Victor (9 April 2019). The Rise and Fall of the Rehabilitative Ideal, 1895–1970. Taylor & Francis. ISBN 978-0-429-66388-8.
- Cheney, Deborah (10 August 2010). "Dr Mary Louisa Gordon (1861–1941): A Feminist Approach in Prison". Feminist Legal Studies. 18 (2): 115–136. doi:10.1007/s10691-010-9151-4. S2CID 143466926.
- Oakley, Ann (1 March 2019). Women, peace and welfare: A suppressed history of social reform, 1880–1920. Policy Press. ISBN 978-1-4473-3262-6.
- Schwan, Anne (2 December 2014). Convict Voices: Women, Class, and Writing about Prison in Nineteenth-Century England. University of New Hampshire Press. ISBN 978-1-61168-673-9.
- Smith, Martin Ferguson (2 March 2016). "Virginia Woolf and 'the Hermaphrodite': A Feminist Fan of Orlando and Critic of Roger Fry". English Studies. 97 (3): 277–297. doi:10.1080/0013838X.2015.1121724. S2CID 164195139.
