= Joan Mary Fry =

English Quaker campaigner

Joan Mary Fry (27 July 1862 – 25 November 1955) was an English Quaker campaigner for peace and social reform.

== Early life ==
Joan Fry was born on 27 July 1862 in London, into a wealthy family of Quakers. She was the daughter of a judge, Sir Edward Fry and his wife, Mariabella Hodgkin (1833 – 1930), and sister of art critic Roger Fry who was a member of the avant-garde Bloomsbury Group, of the prison reformer Margery Fry, of the Quaker activist and writer Ruth Fry, of the poet and bryologist Agnes Fry.

== Work ==
During the First World War she served as a Quaker Prison Chaplain and helped conscientious objectors to military service at their tribunals and in prison.

In 1919 she and other Friends travelled to the defeated Germany and organised food distribution networks as famine relief there. Seven years later, Fry returned to the United Kingdom in 1926 where she further worked to relieve poverty and unemployment.

She gave the 1910 Swarthmore Lecture, entitled The Communion of Life to the Quakers' "London Yearly Meeting".

== Personal life ==
When her sister-in-law Helen Coombe was placed permanently in a mental hospital, she helped her brother Roger with bringing up their children.

She was a committed vegetarian.

== Death ==
Fry died in London on 25 November 1955.

== Recognition ==
The Royal Mail's "Britons of Distinction" postage stamps - issued on 23 February 2012 - celebrated ten people from the world of science and technology, architecture, politics and the arts. One of them features Joan Mary Fry.

== Sources ==
- Oxford Dictionary of National Biography article by Sybil Oldfield, 'Fry, Joan Mary (1862–1955)’, Oxford University Press, 2004 . Retrieved 27 Dec 2006.

== Joan Mary Fry's publications ==
as listed in the catalogue of the Library of the Religious Society of Friends, London

- The communion of life. - 1910 Swarthmore Lecture
- For fellowship and freedom : some aspects of the Society of Friends. - 1908, Published in German ?1920: Freundschaft und Freiheit : einige Gesichtspunkte zum Verständnis der Gesellschaft der Freunde. Published in Swedish, 1921: Gemenskap och frihet : några synpunkter till klargörande av Vännernas Sällskap.
- In downcast Germany 1919-1933. - 1944 published in German: Zwischen zwei Weltkriegen in Deutschland : Erinnerungen einer Quäkerin. 1947
- Sidelights on Biblical texts. - [1956]

'Papers in collections'

- Some papers and addresses from the Friends summer school, Birmingham, September, 1899 / Rawnsley, H. D.; Graham, John William, Fry, Edward; Cremer, Pastor; Fry, Joan Mary; Wallis, Mary Anne, 1847-1918; Govan, Horace E.; Grubb, Edward, 1854-1939; Braithwaite, William Charles.
- Christ and peace : a discussion of some fundamental issues raised by the war : essays /Henry T Hodgkin, Richard Roberts, A. Maude Royden, W.E. Orchard, J St.G Heath, W. Fearon Halliday. Introduced and edited by Joan Mary Fry.,
- Echoes from Scarborough : being a series of papers read at the Scarborough Summer School, 1897 / Braithwaite, William Charles; Crosfield, Gulielma; Fry, Joan Mary; Hodgkin, Thomas; Littleboy, William; Richardson, Anne Wakefield; Rowntree, John Stephenson; Newman, Henry Stanley; Wallis, Mary Anne.
- Friends lend a hand in alleviating unemployment : the story of a social experiment extending over 20 years, 1926-1946 / Fry, Joan Mary; Richmond, Arthur Cyril. 1947
