= Margery Fry =

English prison reformer

Margery Fry JP
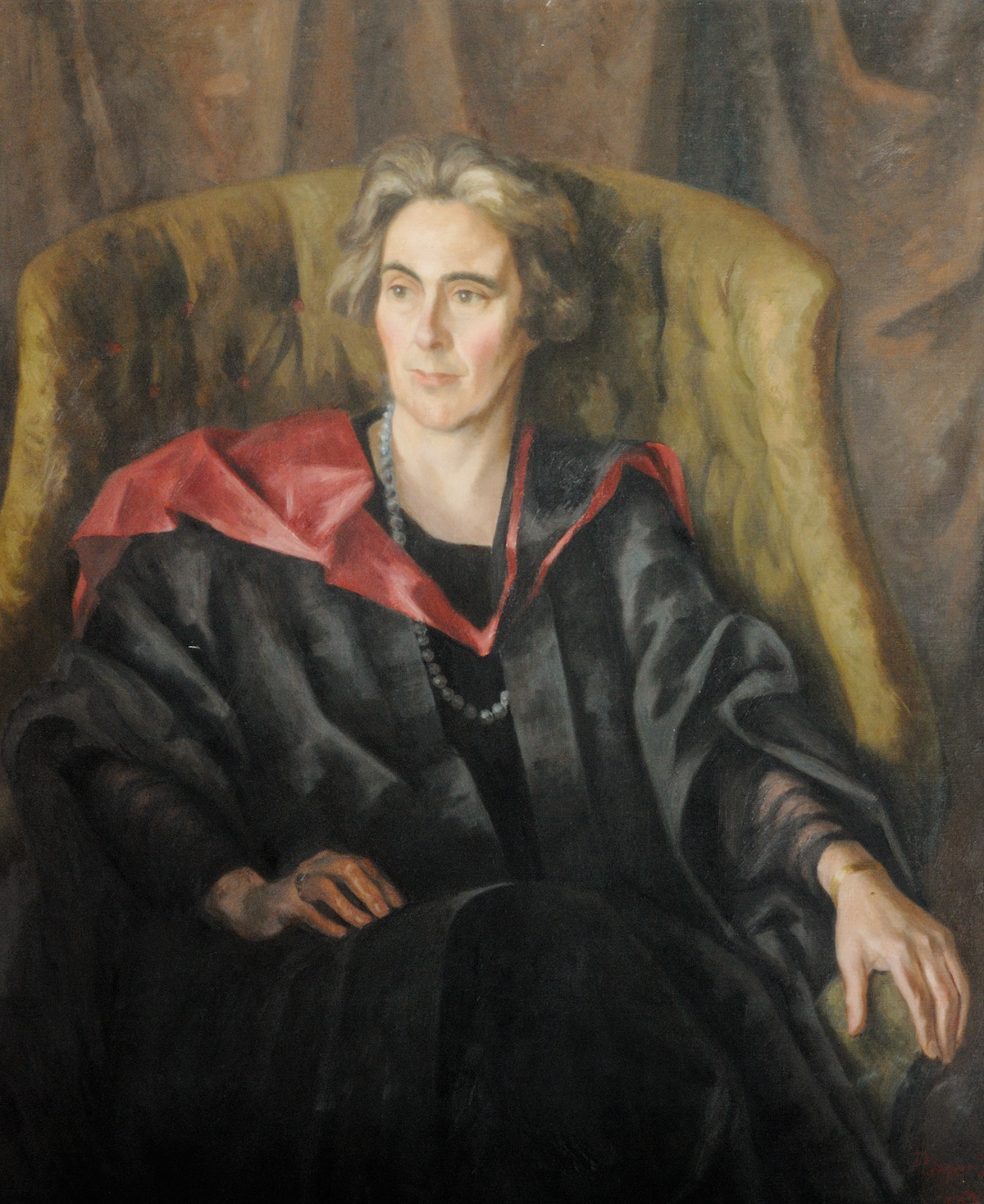
- As principal (by her brother Roger Fry)
- Born: Sara Margery Fry; 11 March 1874; London, United Kingdom of Great Britain and Ireland
- Died: 21 April 1958 (aged 84)

Academic work
- School or tradition: Somerville College, Oxford
- Notable ideas: Penal reformer

Sara Margery Fry JP (11 March 1874 – 21 April 1958) was a British prison reformer as well as one of the first women to become a magistrate. She was the secretary of the Howard League for Penal Reform and the principal of Somerville College, Oxford.

== Early life ==
Fry was born in London in 1874. She was the child of Quakers Sir Edward Fry, a judge, and his wife, Mariabella Hodgkin (1833–1930). Her siblings included Joan Mary Fry, the social reformer, Roger Fry of the Bloomsbury Group, the biographer and bryologist Agnes Fry and pacifist Anna Ruth Fry. She was home schooled until she was seventeen when she attended Miss Lawrence's school at Brighton before proceeding to study maths at Somerville College, Oxford in 1894. She went home after she graduated but returned to Somerville to become their librarian.

In 1904, she left Somerville and became Warden of University House, the new women's residence at the University of Birmingham, at an annual salary of £60. It was there that Fry met educationist and fellow relief worker Marjorie Rackstraw, who would become her lifelong friend.

In 1913 her uncle Joseph Storrs Fry died and left her sufficient money that she left her position at Birmingham in the following year. After 1915, she helped organise Quaker relief efforts in the Marne war area, and then elsewhere in France.

== Belief in penal reform ==
After the First World War, she lived with her brother Roger and began the work on prison reform in which she was to be involved until the end of her life. In 1918, she became secretary of the Penal Reform League, which merged with the Howard Association in 1921 to form the Howard League for Penal Reform; she was secretary of the combined organisation until 1926.

In 1921 she was appointed a magistrate, one of the first women magistrates in Britain. In 1922 she was appointed education advisor to Holloway Prison (a prison for women in London). Margery Fry was Director of the Howard League for Penal Reform from its foundation in 1921 until 1926. She served as Chair of the league's Council from 1926 to 1929.

She also became concerned with compensation for victims of crimes which resulted in an article, "Justice for Victims", in the Observer in 1957 and republished as part of a round table article in the Journal of Public Law. Gerhard Mueller in 1965 wrote "Margery Fry is at the root of all current proposals for victim compensation".

== Academic career ==
Fry studied mathematics at Somerville College, Oxford. She was Librarian at Somerville (1899–1904). In 1904, she became Warden of the women's residence at the University of Birmingham.

From 1926 to 1930, she was Principal of Somerville College. Her appointment was hailed as "[combining] intellectual distinction, a fine eloquence, and academic experience with the force of character and sympathy which the post demands." The Graduate (Middle Common Room, or MCR) accommodation building at Somerville College is called 'Margery Fry House' in her honour.

Somerville College Library holds a collection of her correspondence and papers.

== Other ==
In 1919, she was appointed to the newly founded University Grants Committee on which she served until 1948.

She was also a governor of the BBC from 1937 to 1938 and a participant in The Brains Trust series starting in 1942. The Fry Housing Trust was established in 1959, in memory of Margery Fry. In 1990, the Margery Fry Award was established in her honour.

== Bibliography ==
- Margery Fry: The Essential Amateur by Enid Huws Jones, Oxford University Press. 1966.
- "Margery Fry", Oxford Dictionary of National Biography. Written by Thomas L. Hodgkin, rev. Mark Pottle. doi:10.1093/ref:odnb/33286
- The Politics of Penal Reform: Margery Fry and the Howard League (2017) by Ann Logan

| Preceded by Emily Penrose | Principal; Somerville College, Oxford; 1926–1930 | Succeeded by Helen Darbishire |
| Preceded by First holder | Secretary; Howard League for Penal Reform; 1921-1926 | Succeeded by Cicely Craven |
