= Fram (play) =

- Written by: Tony Harrison
- Original language: English
- Subject: Fridtjof Nansen's arctic exploration and campaigning for Russian famine relief

Premiere
- Date premiered: 10 April 2008
- Place premiered: Royal National Theatre, London
- Official website

Fram (Norwegian for Forward) is a 2008 play by Tony Harrison. It uses the story of the Norwegian explorer Fridtjof Nansen's attempt to reach the North Pole, and his subsequent campaign to relieve famine in the Soviet Union to explore the role of art in a world beset by seemingly greater issues. It is named after Fram, the ship built for Nansen for his Arctic journey, and subsequently used by Roald Amundsen to reach the South Pole.

Fram received its premiere at the Olivier auditorium of the Royal National Theatre, London on 10 April 2008. The National Theatre's production was directed by Tony Harrison and Bob Crowley; its cast included Jasper Britton as Nansen, Mark Addy as Hjalmar Johansen, Sian Thomas as Sybil Thorndike and Jeff Rawle as Gilbert Murray.

== Plot ==
The play starts in Poets' Corner, Westminster Abbey in London, where the ghost of Gilbert Murray enlists Sybil Thorndike to join her in his new play, Fram, at the Royal National Theatre. They travel from the Abbey to the theatre to begin the play, and it starts in the Arctic with Bob and his suicidal alcoholic companion Jeff trying to reach the North Pole.

It skips forward in time to after Bob and Jeff's record has been broken. In despair, Bob becomes desperate, and Jeff shoots himself. Bob then goes on to try to help the victims of the Russian famine, though he is haunted by the ghost of Jeff. Bob associates with Gilbert Murray and Sybil Thorndike in his attempts to support the work in helping the children in Russia.

Murray and Thorndike are returning to Poets' Corner where they are haunted by a muted Kurdish refugee poet (based on Abas Amini ). As he is about to ascend to the afterworld of the poets, Murray declares himself unworthy and storms off.

The play ends with Bob and Jeff describing the plight of two African refugees who died of cold aboard a plane.

== Themes ==
There are many themes used in the play, most of which relate to modern day problems in the world.

- Refugees: both the mute Kurdish refugee and the two African boys are refugees, and they are portrayed as great heroes, heading for a destination. This is linked into the Bob passport scheme, and the inability of the famine victims to flee to the west.
- Climate Change: the plays' final scene is a projection of London under snow, and Bob himself described the end of the world as one that would be covered in ice, which he contrasted with the fiery Ragnarok of Norse myth.
- Famine: the play largely bases itself around the Russian famine of 1921, and deals with the theme of famine. Eglantyne notes that if some sort of projection device could be put into people's homes (an allusion to the television), then the scenes of famine could be broadcast to the masses, and everyone would send money. Murray replies with the fact that they could simply turn it off.
- Socialism versus Social Darwinism: Bob goes from being a Social Darwinist to supporting humanitarianism with the Russian aid movement, whereas Jeff goes from believing in a united socialist world to a social Darwinist view after his death.
- The value of Art: A debate is held to discover which art form, including poetry, theatre or cinema is best at describing the horrors of famine.

== Cast ==
The cast of the original National Theatre production:

- Jeff – Mark Addy
- Bob – Jasper Britton
- ARA Man A – Jim Creighton
- Sheldon – Patrick Drury
- Ballerina – Viviana Durante
- ARA Man B – Steven Helliwell
- Kurdish Poet – Aykut Hilmi
- Ruth Fry – Clare Lawrence
- Eglantyne Jebb – Carolyn Pickles
- Gilbert Murray – Jeff Rawle
- Sybil Thorndike – Sian Thomas
- ARA Man C – Joseph Thompson

== Critical response ==
The National Theatre production received generally unenthusiastic reviews.

The use of verse received criticism, with many reviewers lampooning it with their own attempts at doggerel. Rhoda Koenig wrote, "Since the play stands up for poetry in a world dominated by fact and image, it's unfortunate that Harrison's verse does not provide much evidence for the defence".

There was some admiration for the scope of the themes addressed. Heather Neill of The Stage wrote, “... no-one is in any doubt that serious issues are being addressed". Michael Billington commented, "It hardly makes for a coherent whole, but it has exciting moments and a wild madcap inventiveness...He has bitten off more than any single play can chew and, dramatically, there are dead patches. But I can forgive any play that aims high". However, some reviewers found the play too long and self-indulgent. For example, The Daily Telegraph complained, "Harrison the director appears to have done nothing to curb Harrison the poet's intolerable logorrhea.”

Many critics praised Sian Thomas's Thorndike. The Stage called it "a brilliant, brave, performance as a red-gowned Thorndike demonstrating the power of theatre to change minds by acting a starving Russian".

The journal Arion published a critical appraisal by Rebecca Nemser describing Fram as "not just a play within a play, but a theater within a theater. Most of all, it is a poem about poetry." Nemser praises the play while recognising its problematic reception:

"At intermission, the audience drank wine and talked about the play on the terrace of the National Theatre on London's South Bank. London's monuments were all illuminated, reflected in the dark waters of the Thames. 'It's in verse,' one woman hissed, outraged. Some drifted away into the lovely spring night and did not return. And indeed Fram is not for the squeamish; it is full of evocations of foul smells, buzzing flies, rotted flesh, cannibalism, horse-dung bread, the horrors of war, famine, despair, and doubt."

Doubt, in Nemser's view, lies at the thematic heart of the play.
