= University House, University of Birmingham =

Business school and former hall of residence in Birmingham, England

Coordinates: 52.4495°N 1.9253°W

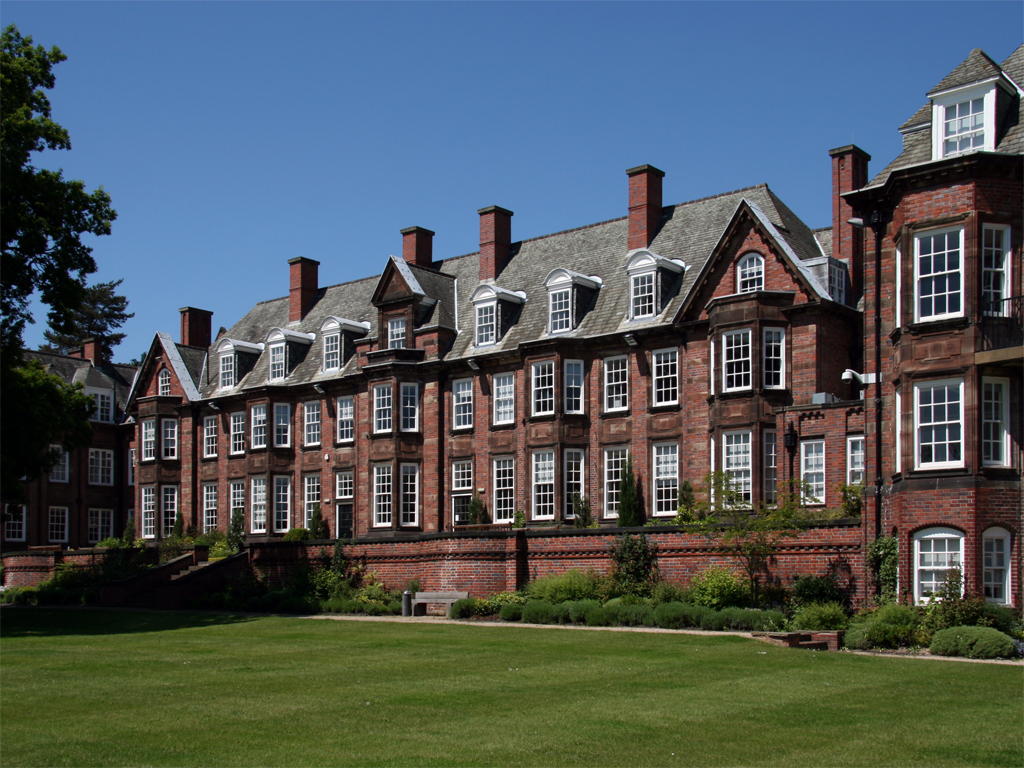
University House

Originally a hall of residence at the University of Birmingham, University House became the home for the university's business school in 2004 after having been extensively refurbished and extended to provide teaching and research facilities. It is located in grounds in the conservation area of Edgbaston, Birmingham, and is a grade II listed building.

The name 'University House' was originally given to a rented building on Hagley Road in 1904. The present building was constructed in 1908 as a residence for female students at the university. Margery Fry was UH's first warden, from its beginnings at Hagley Road, and remained in post until 1914. Rose Sidgwick, lecturer in History at the university, managed the UH library and was commemorated after her death in the 1918 flu pandemic by an ornamental birdbath in the gardens. In 1964, the hall became one of the UK's first mixed-sex university residences. It remained so until its closure as a residence in July 2002.

Archives of University House as a hall of residence and of the University House Association are held at the University of Birmingham Library.
