= Clare Lawrence Moody =

English actress and producer

- Other name: Clare Lawrence-Moody
- Occupation: actor/theatre producer

Clare Lawrence Moody is an English television and stage actor and producer. She is also credited as Clare Lawrence.

== Biography ==
Moody first acted as a child in Crown Court and Coronation Street. She was cast alongside future Dames Joan Plowright and Dorothy Tutin in the film This Could Be the Last Time (1998). She has since appeared in EastEnders, Ultimate Force, The Bill, Bad Girls, Longitude (2000), Harry and Pride (2014).

She appeared onstage at the Royal National Theatre as Ruth Fry in Fram (2008) by Tony Harrison, in Mine (2008) by Polly Teale for Shared Experience, and as Dorothy Markham in "The Girls of Slender Means" by Muriel Spark adapted by Judith Adams.Her radio work includes leads in Let's Murder Vivaldi (a 2008 adaptation of David Mercer's television play), 27 Wagons Full of Cotton, Amerika and Ghost in the Mechanic.

She and Anna Waterhouse also run the West End theatre production company Out of the Blue Productions. Its productions have included This Is Our Youth by Kenneth Lonergan starring amongst four casts Matt Damon, Jake Gyllenhaal and Anna Paquin, A Life in the Theatre starring Patrick Stewart and Oleanna by David Mamet with Aaron Eckhart, and Some Girl(s) by Neil LaBute with David Schwimmer. Lawrence has also produced Fool for Love with Juliette Lewis. In 2004 she was named by the Observer Newspaper as one of the 80 young people predicted to shape the culture of her generation.

== Family ==
Her sister, Laura Moody, is an avant-garde musician, composer and cellist.
