= Cicely Craven =

British prison reformer

- Born: 23 March 1890; Near Kendal, Westmorland, England
- Died: 9 February 1962 (aged 71); Welwyn Garden City, Hertfordshire, England, UK
- Occupations: Educator, prison reformer

Cicely Musgrave Craven (23 March 1890 – 9 February 1962) was a British educator, magistrate, and prison reformer.

== Early life ==
Cicely Musgrave Craven was born near Kendal, Westmorland, the daughter of Robert Musgrave Craven and Margaret Gibbons Craven. Her father was a medical examiner. She was educated at Wycombe Abbey school, and at St Hilda’s College, Oxford, where she studied history from 1909 to 1912. (Her degree was not granted until 1920, when women were first allowed to receive Oxford degrees.) She also earned a London teaching credential.

== Career ==
Craven taught history at Winchester Girls’ High School in 1914 and 1915, and at Grey Coat Hospital School in 1916. During World War I, she worked at the Ministry of Pensions and the Ministry of Labour. In 1926, with no previous engagement in the cause of prison reform, Craven replaced Margery Fry as secretary of the Howard League for Penal Reform. She was also editor of the Howard Journal. In this role, she testified in parliamentary hearings, gave interviews, wrote for periodicals and professional journals, conducted summer schools, and worked with other organizations on common causes. She took particular interest in preventive and remedial approaches to juvenile delinquency. She retired from the Howard League in 1950, and was succeeded by the League's first full-time paid secretary, Hugh Klare.

Craven was appointed justice of the peace for St Albans in the 1930s, and was district councillor for the same city from 1928 to 1932. She was also active in the St Albans Housing Association.

== Personal life ==
Craven lived with her sister, Millicent Musgrave Craven, a social worker, in Welwyn Garden City. Cicely Craven died there in 1962, aged 71 years, from cancer. Her correspondence with Scottish nationalist William Gillies on Palestine penal code is preserved in the Labour History Archive and Study Centre at the People's History Museum in Manchester.

Preceded by Margery Fry	Secretary; Howard League for Penal Reform; 1926-1950	Succeeded by Hugh Klare
