= Walter Jessop (surgeon) =

Walter Hamilton Hylton Jessop FRCS
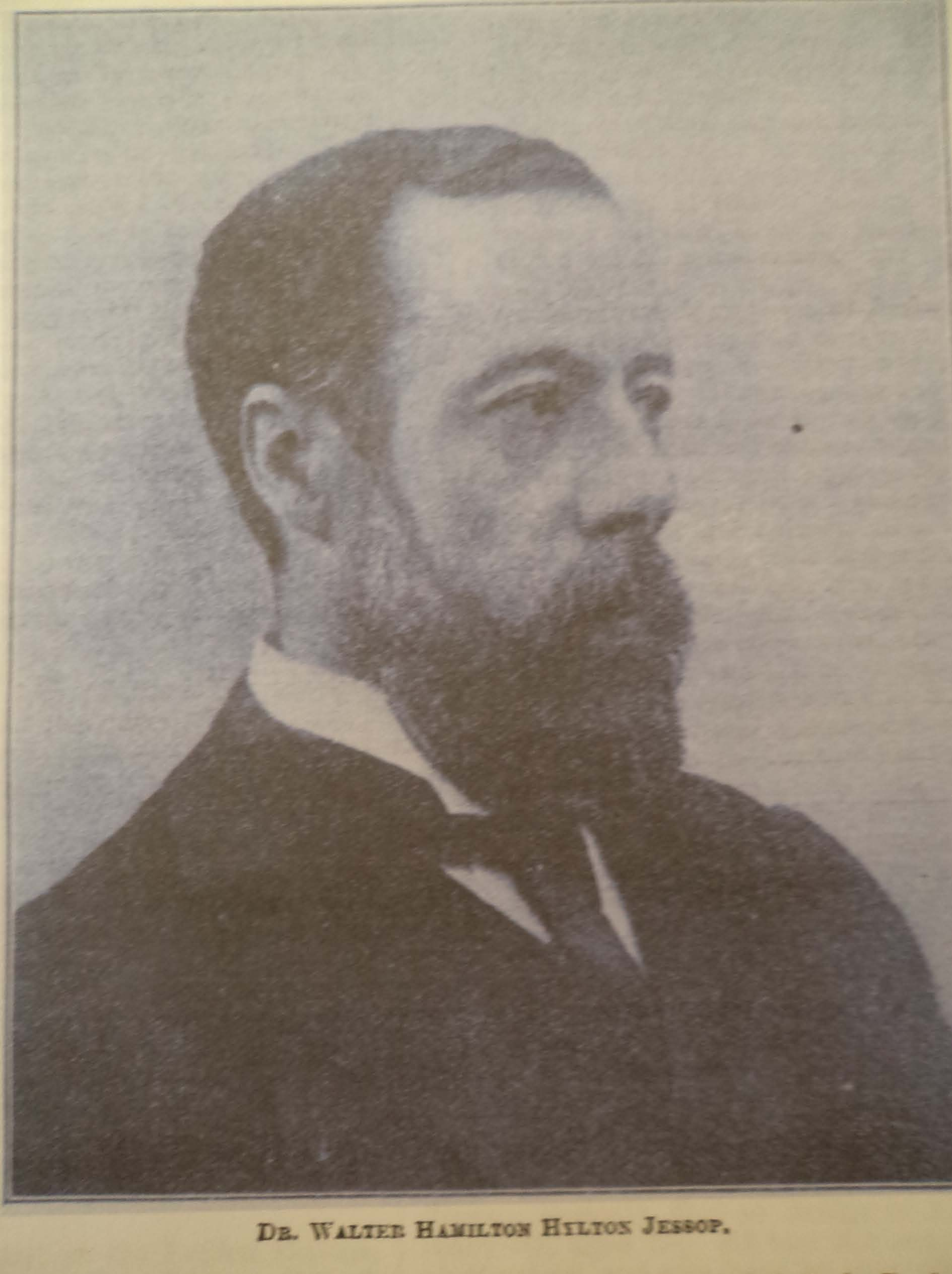
- Born: 1852
- Died: 16 February 1917 (aged 64–65)
- Occupation: Ophthalmic Surgeon

Walter Hamilton Hylton Jessop FRCS (1852 – 16 February 1917) was a Hunterian Professor of comparative anatomy and physiology (1887–88), Ophthalmic Surgeon (to the Western General Dispensary, the Foundling Hospital and to the Children's Hospital at Paddington Green), Senior Ophthalmic Surgeon to St Bartholomew's Hospital (1901), President of the Ophthalmological Society of the United Kingdom (1915–17) and someone who "made a unique position for himself in the ophthalmological world and was probably the best known of English ophthalmic surgeons to his brethren on the Continent of Europe."

== Early life and education ==
Jessop was born in 1852, the son of Walter Jessop, a surgeon, from Cheltenham. He was educated at Bedford Modern School and Gonville and Caius College, Cambridge (Matric. Michs. 1872; Tancred Scholar, 1872; B.A. 1876; M.B. and M.A. 1886).

== Career ==
Jessop joined the staff of St Bartholomew's Hospital (1882). He became Senior Demonstrator in anatomy at St Bartholomew's Hospital (1882–94), Hunterian Professor of comparative anatomy and physiology (1887-8) and was subsequently Ophthalmic Surgeon to the Western General Dispensary, to the Foundling Hospital and to the Children's Hospital at Paddington Green. He was made Senior Ophthalmic Surgeon at St Bartholomew's Hospital in 1901.

Jessop was President of the Ophthalmological Society of the United Kingdom between 1915 and 1917, and made exhaustive research on the action of cocaine on the eye. According to his obituary, he 'made a unique position for himself in the ophthalmological world and was probably the best known of English ophthalmic surgeons to his brethren on the Continent of Europe'. He was made a Member of the Royal College of Surgeons in 1880 and a Fellow of the Royal College of Surgeons in 1884.

Jessop was an author, of Manual on Diseases of the Eye (2nd ed., 1908), Manual of Ophthalmic Surgery and Medicine, and other works. In his later years, he assisted in arranging a British Journal of Ophthalmology. He was a J.P. for Berkshire.

== Death ==
Jessop died on 16 February 1917.
