= Edward Fry =

British judge (1827–1918)

The Right Honourable Sir Edward Fry GCB, GCMG, FRS, FBA
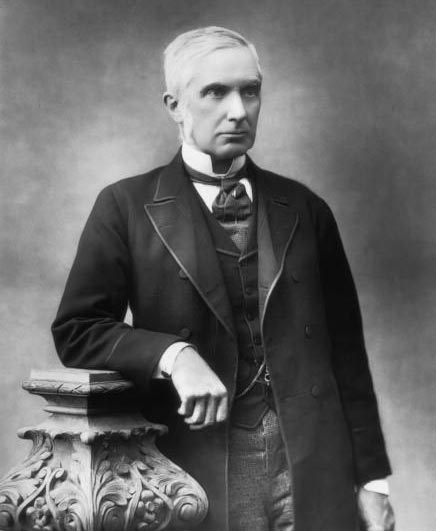

Lord Justice of Appeal
- In office 1883–1892

Justice of the High Court
- In office 1877–1883

Personal details
- Born: 4 November 1827
- Died: 19 October 1918 (aged 90)

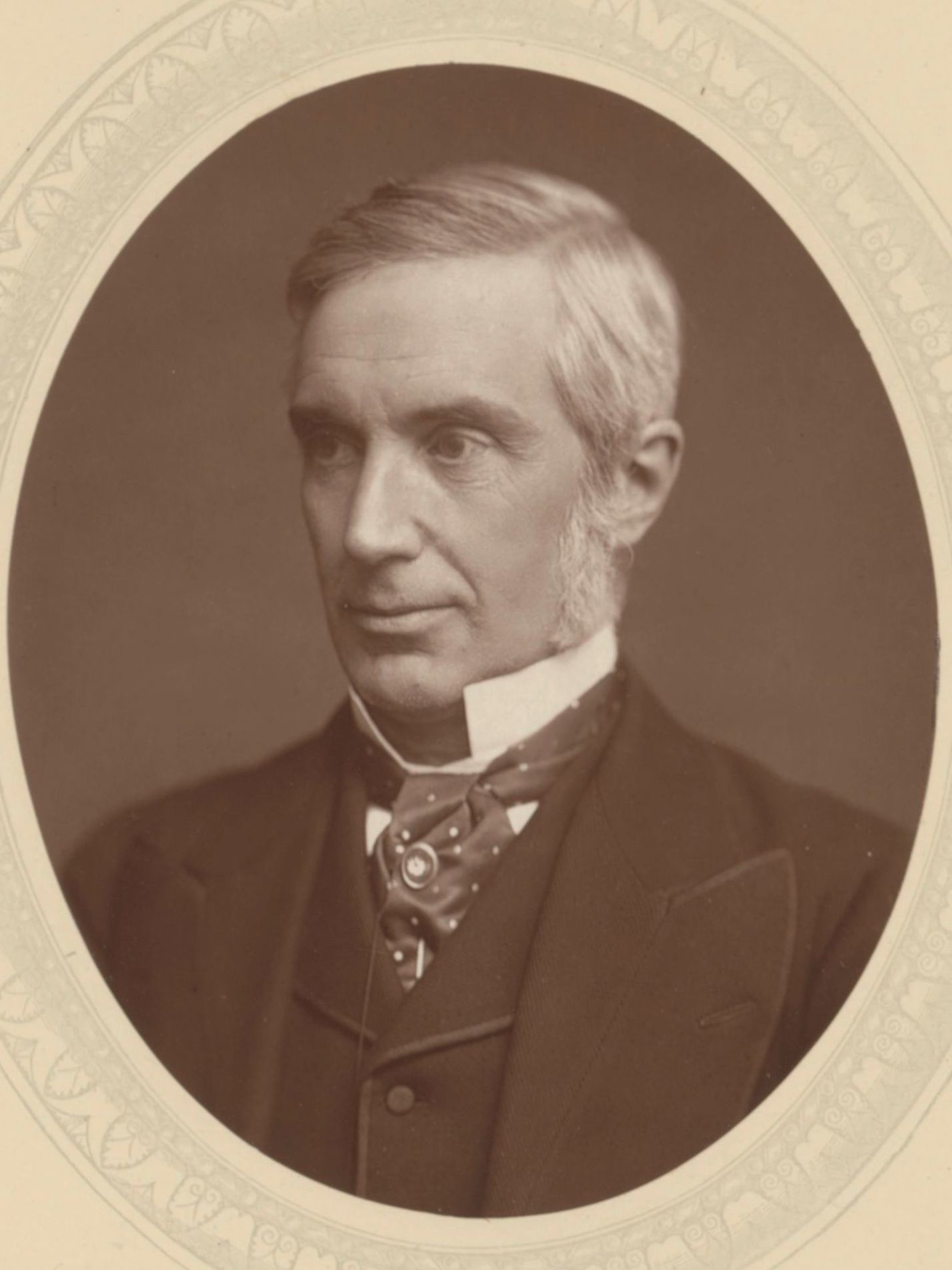
Lord Justice Fry in the mid to late 1870s

Sir Edward Fry, GCB, GCMG, FRS, FBA (4 November 1827 – 19 October 1918) was an English Lord Justice of Appeal (1883–1892) and an arbitrator on the Permanent Court of Arbitration.

== Biography ==
Joseph Fry (1795–1879) and Mary Ann Swaine were his parents. He was a Quaker from a prominent Bristol family which founded and owned the chocolate firm J. S. Fry & Sons. His grandfather was Joseph Storrs Fry (1767–1835) and his brothers included a second Joseph Storrs Fry (1826–1913) who ran the firm and Lewis Fry (1832–1921) who was a politician.

He was called to the bar in 1854, took silk in 1869 and became a judge in Chancery in 1877, receiving the customary knighthood. He was raised to the Court of Appeal in 1883, and was sworn of the Privy Council. He retired in 1892. Retirement from the court did not mean retirement from legal work. He sat on some cases in the Judicial Committee of the Privy Council. In 1897 he accepted an offer to preside over the royal commission on the Irish Land Acts. He also acted as an arbitrator in the Welsh coal strike (1898), the Grimsby fishery dispute (1901) and between the London and North Western Railway Company and its employees (1906, 1907).

Fry was appointed GCMG and GCB in 1907.

=== International legal and arbitration career ===
He was also involved in international law. In 1902 he acted as one of five arbitrators at The Hague in the Pious Fund of the Californias dispute between the United States and Mexico, the first dispute between states arbitrated by the Permanent Court of Arbitration. In 1904 he was the British legal assessor on the commission to investigate the Dogger Bank incident where the Russian navy accidentally attacked a British herring fleet in the North Sea. He was involved in the second Hague Conference (1907). In 1908/1909 he was an arbitrator between France and Germany over a case where France had seized deserters (including some German citizens) from German diplomatic protection.

=== Zoological and botanical work ===
Besides law he was on the council of University College London and interested in Zoology (he was elected to the Royal Society in 1883).

He wrote two books on bryophytes, British Mosses (1892) and, with his daughter Agnes, The Liverworts: British and Foreign (1911).

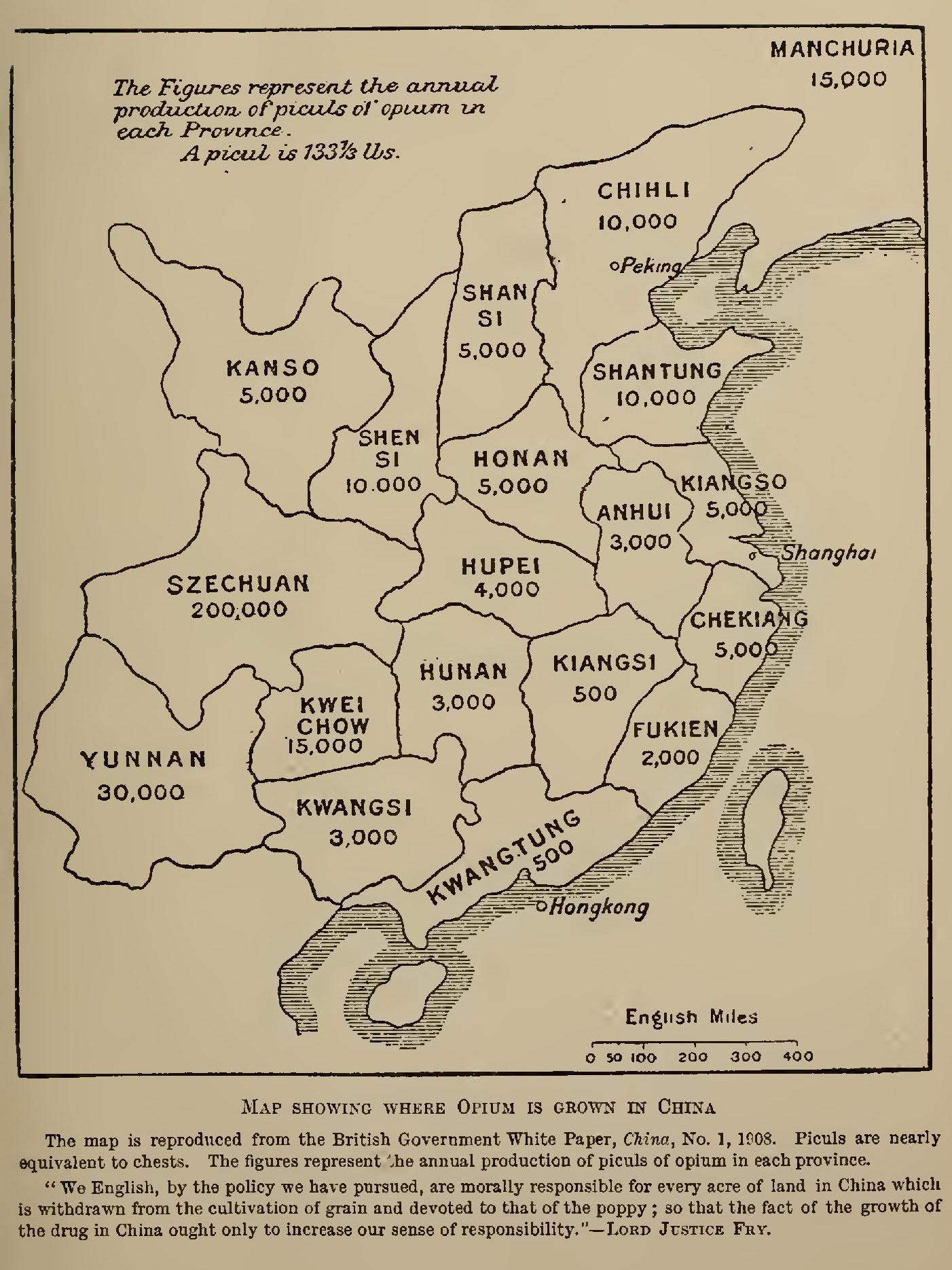
"Map showing where opium is grown in China" reproduced from the British government White Paper on China in 1908

=== Suppression of opium ===
In his preface to the 1884 report to the Houses of Parliament titled The Indo-Chinese opium trade considered in relation to its history, morality, and expediency, and its influence on Christian missions, Fry wrote:

"We English, by the policy we have pursued, are morally responsible for every acre of land in China which is withdrawn from the cultivation of grain and devoted to that of the poppy; so that the fact of the growth of the drug [opium] in China ought only to increase our sense of responsibility".

== Judgments ==
Judgments of Fry include:

- Foakes v Beer [1884] UKHL 1, [1881-85] All ER Rep 106, (1884) 9 App Cas 605; 54 LJQB 130; 51 LT 833; 33 WR 233 - (Fry sitting in the Court of Appeal) - a leading case from the House of Lords on the legal concept of consideration.
- Smith v Land and House Property Corp (1884) LR 28 Ch D 7 - English contract law case, concerning misrepresentation and holding that a statement of opinion can represent that one knows certain facts, and can amount to misrepresentation.
- Isle of Wight Rly Co v Tahourdin (1884) LR 25 Ch D 320 - a UK company law case on removing directors under the Companies Clauses Act 1845; Fry concurring with Cotton LJ and Lindley LJ
- Edgington v Fitzmaurice (1885) 29 Ch D 459 - contract law case, concerning misrepresentation
- Falcke v Scottish Imperial Insurance Co (1886) 34 Ch 234 - an English unjust enrichment law case, also concerning English contract law, and setting out some fundamental principles of construction of obligations, as viewed to exist by the late 19th-century English judiciary; Fry concurring with Bowen LJ.
- In the Arbitration between Secretary of State for Home Department and Fletcher (1887) - upholding a Queens bench decision supporting the authority of the Inspector of Mines to require the use of safety lamps; Bowen LJ dissenting.
- Mogul Steamship Co Ltd v McGregor, Gow & Co [1892] AC 25, (1889) 23 QBD 598, (1888) LR 21 QBD 544 - (Fry sitting in the Court of Appeal) - an English tort law case concerning the economic tort of conspiracy to injure. A product of its time, the courts adhered to a laissez faire doctrine allowing firms to form a cartel.
- British South Africa Co v Companhia de Moçambique [1893] AC 602 (Fry sitting in the Court of Appeal) - the House of Lords overturned Fry's Court of Appeal decision and by so doing established the Mozambique rule, a common law rule in private international law that renders actions relating to title in foreign land, the right to possession of foreign land, and trespass to foreign land non-justiciable in common law jurisdictions.

== Family ==
Edward Fry married in 1859 Mariabella Hodgkin (1833–1930), daughter of John Hodgkin, granddaughter of Luke Howard, and sister of the historian, Thomas Hodgkin: and they were the parents of seven daughters, one dying young, and two sons. They lived in Highgate at 5 The Grove, a house later owned by the singer George Michael.

- Edward Portsmouth Fry (1860-1928)
- Mariabella Fry (1861-1920)
- Joan Mary Fry (1862–1955) Quaker social reformer
- Elizabeth Alice Fry (1864-1868)
- Roger Eliot Fry (1866–1934) – Artist, member of the Bloomsbury Group
- Agnes Fry (1869–1957) – co-writer with her father on several scientific treatises and later wrote a biography of him; and her twin sister Isabel Fry (1869-1958), educator
- (Sara) Margery Fry (1874–1958) – penal reformer, principal of Somerville College (1926–1931), founder of the Howard League
- (Anna) Ruth Fry (1878–1962) – pacifist and Quaker activist.
