= Ruth Fry =

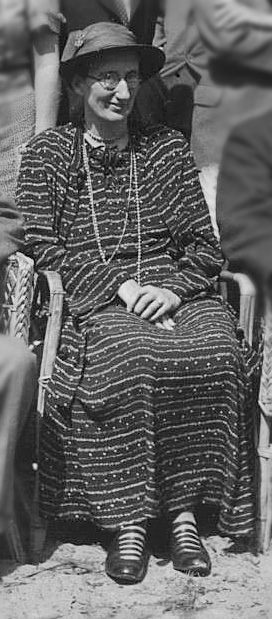
- Fry in 1938
- Born: Anna Ruth Fry; 4 September 1878; Highgate, London, UK
- Died: 26 April 1962 (aged 83)
- Occupations: Writer, peace activist
- Known for: Pacifist activisim from a Quaker perspective

Anna Ruth Fry, usually known as Ruth Fry (4 September 1878 – 26 April 1962), was a British Quaker writer, pacifist and peace activist.

== Life ==
Ruth was born in Highgate, London, into a Quaker family - her father was Sir Edward Fry, a judge and lawyer who became known worldwide for his skilled work as a negotiator at the Hague Tribunal in 1907 - and she was educated at home. She then worked as a peace activist and a writer, serving as treasurer of the Boer Home Industries Commission during the Boer War, as general secretary of the Friends War Victims Relief Committee (a committee organised by British Quakers to provide help for refugees and victims of the First World War) from 1914 to 1924, as first chairman of the Russian Famine Relief Fund in 1921, as the secretary for the National Council for the Prevention of War in 1926-27, and as the treasurer of the London branch of the War Resisters' International in 1936-1937. She died on 26 April 1962, aged 83.

== Literary works ==
In the First World War she toured the war zones as a traveling commissioner, writing about the relief efforts in her book A Quaker Adventure (1926). She was appointed to the editorial board of the Fellowship of Reconciliation's journal Reconciliation in 1935. She published a number of pamphlets and leaflets on pacifism and nonviolence in action.

== In fiction ==
She appears as a character in Tony Harrison's 2008 play Fram, played in its premiere at the National Theatre by Clare Lawrence.
