= Cecil Roderick Fry =

English confectioner (1890–1952)

- Born: 1890
- Died: 1952 (aged 61–62)
- Occupation: Chairman of J. S. Fry & Sons (1924-1952)
- Spouse(s): Olave, (died in 1949)
- Children: 3

Cecil Roderick Fry (1890–1952) was a member of the Fry family who ran the J. S. Fry & Sons confectionery business after the First World War.

He was the great-great-grandson of Joseph Fry, the firm's founder. He was chairman of J. S. Fry & Sons for 28 years, from the retirement of his father in 1924 to his own death in 1952. After the takeover by Cadbury Brothers in 1935, he was invited to stay on as chairman even though it was a largely symbolic role since there was no board for him to chair.

He first joined the firm in 1909, and became a director after serving in the Royal Flying Corps during the First World War. He and Sir Egbert Cadbury were charged with finding a suitable location for the new Fry's chocolate factory (Somerdale Factory), which was built in several stages between 1921 and 1935 in Keynsham, Bristol, the first part in use from 1923.

With Paul Strangman Cadbury, he was a director of Fry-Cadbury (Ireland) which set up a factory in Dublin, Ireland, in 1932.

He died on 10 July 1952 and was buried at sea. His wife, Olave, had died in 1949. He left two sons and a daughter. His estate was valued at £190,920 gross (£165,909 net). In his will he wrote, "I make no charitable bequests. The existing rates of death duties, income-tax, surtax, and other forms of taxation should ensure that provision which in other days was left to private individuals."
