= Joseph Fry (type-founder) =

Type-founder and chocolate maker

- Born: 1728
- Died: 27 March 1787 (aged 58–59); Bristol
- Resting place: Friars, Bristol
- Known for: Type-founder and chocolate maker

Joseph Fry (1728 – 27 March 1787) was an English type-founder and chocolate maker, founding the family chocolate company that would later become J. S. Fry & Sons, and founder of the Bristol branch of the Quaker Fry family. He was the first member of his family to settle in Bristol, where he acquired a considerable medical practice, and 'was led to take a part in many new scientific undertakings'.

== Early life and education ==
The eldest son of John Fry (d. 1775) of Sutton Benger, Wiltshire, author of Select Poems (1774), Fry was educated in the north of England. He was bound as an apprentice to Henry Portsmouth of Basingstoke, a doctor, and married Anna, Portsmouth's daughter.

== Business pursuits ==
=== Chocolate production ===
After a time he abandoned medicine for business pursuits. He helped Richard Champion in his Bristol works, and began to make chocolate having purchased Walter Churchman's patent right.

The chocolate and cocoa manufactory thus started has been carried on by the family, J. S. Fry & Sons, down to the early twentieth century.

=== Type-founding ===
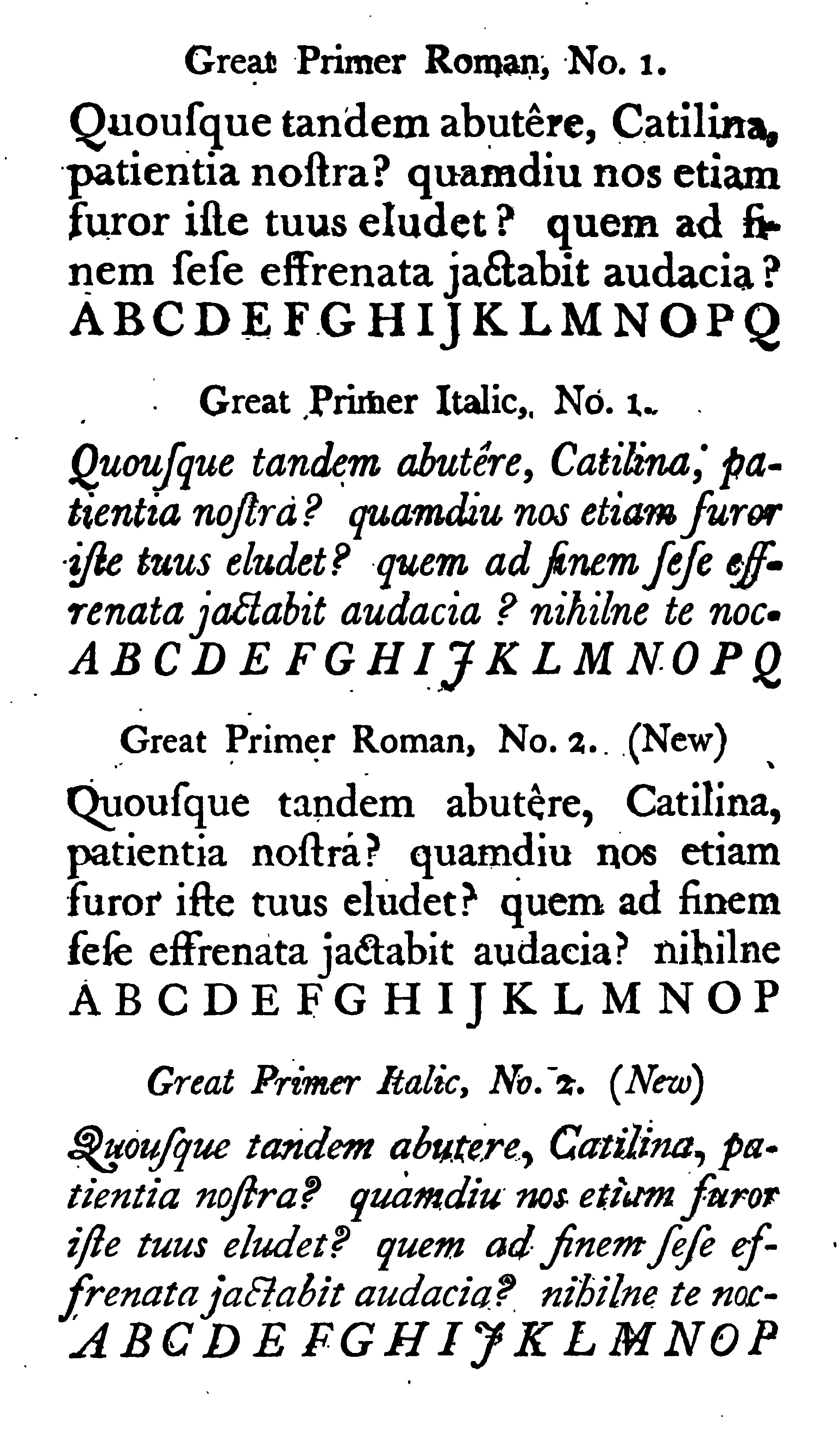
A Fry foundry specimen, showing their copies of Baskerville (above) and Caslon (below) types

The success of John Baskerville caused Fry to turn his attention in 1764 to type-founding, and he entered into a partnership with William Pine, the first printer of the newspaper Bristol Gazette, who had a large business in Wine Street. Their new type may be traced in several works issued between 1764 and 1770. The manager of Messrs. Joseph Fry & Wm Pine was Isaac Moore, formerly a whitesmith at Birmingham, after whose speedy admission to partnership the business (Bristol Letter Foundry of 1764–1773) moved and went to London. He carried on as "Isaac Moore & Co., in Queen Street, near Upper Moorfields". Philip Luckombe mentions Moore as one of three London founders. In 1774 the London firm produced a fine folio bible, and in 1774–1776 a well-printed edition in five volumes. Fry's first founts were cut in imitation of Baskerville's, the punches being engraved by Isaac Moore. About this time they turned away from their earlier Baskerville style of letter, to follow the more popular Caslon character.

Joseph Fry's firm became Joseph Fry of London (1773–1776). In 1774 Pine printed at Bristol a Bible in a pearl type, asserted to be "the smallest a bible was ever printed with". To all these editions, notes were added to escape the penalty of infringing the patent. Two years later the firm became J Fry & Co. (1776–1782), and issued in 1777 reprints of the octavo and folio bibles. Pine subsequently withdrew entirely.

Fry took two of his sons, Edmund (d. 1835) and Henry, into partnership in 1782, and in the same year bought the James Foundry on the death of Rowe Mores, including all its relics of the old English Letter Founders. The business was removed to Worship Street, from where in 1785 was issued "A Specimen of Printing Types made by Joseph Fry & Sons, Letter-founders and Marking Instrument Makers by the King's Royal Letters Patent". In the advertisement the proprietors claim that the types, which are called new, "will mix with, and be totally unknown from, the most approved founts made by the late ingenious artist, William Caslon". The next year they published another "Specimen", with new founts, and including seven pages of oriental types. They now called themselves "Letter-founders to the Prince of Wales".

=== Soap and chemicals ===
Up to the time of his death Fry was a partner with Alderman William Fripp, as Fry, Fripp, & Co., soap-boilers. This business is now in the hands of Christopher Thomas Brothers. Fry also had a chemical works at Battersea, in which he was assisted by his son.

== Death and continuation of the businesses ==
Fry died after a few days' illness, on 27 March 1787.

Edmund Fry, M.D. (1787–1794) carried on with the foundry business which included a partnership with Isaac Steele; the company name was Edmund Fry and Isaac Steele 1794–1799, then Fry Steele & Co 1799–1808. The name then returned once again to Edmund Fry, M.D. Letter Founder to King and Prince Regent 1808–1816. From this date Joseph's legacy became "Edmund Fry & Son" 1816–1828. The foundry was then acquired by William Thorowgood, Letter Founder to His Majesty 1820. The sale included not only Dr Fry's collection of oriental and "learned" founts but also many relics of those old foundries which were incorporated with the James Foundry.

Joseph Fry's other business, the chocolate and cocoa manufactory, was carried on by his widow and a son, Joseph Storrs Fry (1766–1835), under the style of Anna Fry & Son. The previous title had been Fry, Vaughan, & Co. In 1795 the works were removed from Newgate Street to Union Street, where a Watt steam engine was erected, the first in Bristol. Later Joseph Storrs Fry's three sons – Joseph, Francis (1803–1886), and Richard – were joined with him as J. S. Fry & Sons, the name the firm bore until its takeover by Cadburys. His widow was associated for a short time with her sons in the type-foundry. She died at Charterhouse Square, London, 22 October 1803, aged 83.
