= Francis Fry =

English businessman and bibliographer (1803–1886)

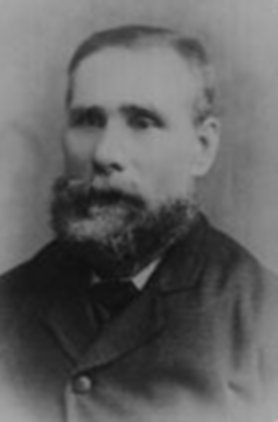
Francis Fry

Francis Fry (1803–1886) was an English businessman and bibliographer.

== Life ==
Fry was born at Westbury-on-Trym, near Bristol, on 28 October 1803, the second son of Joseph Storrs Fry. He was educated at a large school at Fishponds, in the neighbourhood of Frenchay, kept by a Quaker named Joel Lean, and began business training at Croydon.

From the age of 20 to middle age Fry devoted himself to J. S. Fry & Sons, cocoa and chocolate manufacturers in Bristol, in which he became a partner. He participated in the introduction of railways in the west of England, and was a member of the board of the Bristol and Gloucester Railway, which held its first sitting 11 July 1839, retaining his position during various amalgamations of the line until its union with the Midland Railway. He was also a director of the Bristol and Exeter Railway, the South Devon Railway, and other companies. He took a major share in managing the Bristol Waterworks (1846) until his death.

In 1839 Fry moved to Cotham, Bristol. He and his brother Richard bought Cotham Lodge and its estate, by Cotham Tower, formerly a snuff mill; the house was rebuilt.

With William Forster, father of William Edward Forster, and Robert Alsop, Fry visited Northern Italy in 1850, as a deputation from the Society of Friends to various crowned heads, asking for their support in the abolition of slavery. In 1852 he made proposals to the railway companies for a general parcel service throughout the United Kingdom.

He was a member of the committee of the Bristol Philosophical Society, as well as of the Bristol Museum and Library. He took an interest in other associations for social improvement. He died 12 November 1886, soon after the completion of his eighty-third year and was buried in the Friends' graveyard at King's Weston, near Bristol.

== Collector ==
Books and china formed his chief study. His collection of specimens produced at the Bristol factory between 1768 and 1781 was particularly complete. Many examples were described by Hugh Owen. His collection of bibles and testaments numbered nearly thirteen hundred, chiefly English, especially editions of the versions of Tyndale, Coverdale, and Cranmer, but with a number of first editions in other languages.

== Bibliographer and editor ==
He catalogued the library of the Monthly Meeting at Bristol in 1860. On a visit to Germany, a discovery made by Fry at Munich, about books printed at Worms by Peter Schöffer the younger, enabled him to decide that William Tyndale's first English New Testament came from Schöffer's press. Two years later Fry produced his facsimile reprint, by means of tracing and lithography, of Tyndale's New Testament (1525 or 1526), the first complete edition printed in English, from the only perfect copy known at the time, later in the Baptist College, Bristol.

In the same year he edited a facsimile reprint of the pamphlet known as The Souldiers Pocket Bible, distributed to Oliver Cromwell's army, and discovered by George Livermore of Boston, who had himself reprinted it the previous year. Several editions were circulated among the soldiers during the American Civil War. The altered and enlarged edition, The Christian Soldier's Penny Bible (1693), was also facsimiled and edited by Fry.

In 1863 he issued a couple of small rare pieces illustrative of Tyndale's version, and in 1865 published his bibliographical treatise on the Great Bible of 1539, the six editions of Cranmer's Bible of 1540 and 1541, and the five editions of the Authorised Version. Fry visited private and public libraries to collate different copies of these bibles. This work was followed by his account of Miles Coverdale's translation of the Scriptures, and his description of forty editions of Tyndale's version, most of them having variants.

Fry's bibliographical work on Bibles has been called into doubt by later scholarship, such as the work of Brian John McMullin; and his practises in "amending" old Bibles were a hindrance rather than a help.

== Works ==
- A Catalogue of Books in the Library belonging to the Monthly Meeting in Bristol, 3rd edit. Bristol, 1860.
- The First New Testament printed in the English Language (1525 or 1526), translated from the Greek by William Tyndale, reproduced in facsimile, with an Introduction, Bristol, 1862.
- The Souldiers Pocket Bible, printed at London by G. B. and R. W. for G. C. 1643, reproduced in facsimile, with an Introduction, London, 1862, (this consists of texts of Scripture, chiefly from the Geneva version, with special applications).
- The Christian Soldiers Penny Bible, London, printed by R. Smith for Sam. Wade, 1693, reproduced in facsimile with an Introductory Note, London, 1862 (the previous work altered, with the texts from the authorised version somewhat incorrectly quoted).
- A proper Dyaloge betwene a gentillman and a husbandman eche complaynynge to other their miserable calamite through the ambicion of clergye with a compendious olde treatyse shewynge howe that we ought to have the Scripture in Englysshe, Hans Luft, 1530, reproduced in facsimile, with an Introduction, London, 1863.
- The prophete Jonas, with an Introduction by Wm. Tyndale, reproduced in facsimile, to which is added Coverdale's version of Jonah, with an Introduction, London, 1863, (these two works reproduced from unique copies in the library of Lord Arthur Hervey).
- The Standard Edition of the English New Testament of the Genevan Version, London, 1864, (reprinted from the Journal of Sacred Literature, July 1864).
- A Description of the Great Bible, 1539, and the six editions of Cranmer's Bible, 1540 and 1541, printed by Grafton and Whitchurch; also of the editions in large folio of the Authorised Version printed in 1611, 1613, 1617, 1634, 1640; illustrated with titles and with passages from the editions, the genealogies and the maps, copied in facsimile, also with an identification of every leaf of the first seven and of many leaves of the other editions, on fifty-one plates, together with an original leaf of each of the editions described, London, 1865, folio.
- The Bible by Coverdale, 1535, remarks on the titles, the year of publication, &c., with facsimiles, London, 1867.
- A List of most of the Words noticed exhibiting the peculiar orthography used in Tindale's New Testament, Bristol, 1871, (single sheet, circulated to inquire as to the edition "finished in 1535").
- A Bibliographical Description of the Editions of the New Testament, Tyndale's Version in English, with numerous readings, comparisons of texts, and historical notices, the notes in full from the edition of November 1534, an account of two octavo editions of the New Testament of the Bishop's version, without numbers to the verses, illustrated with 73 plates, London, 1878.
- Description of a Title-page of a New Testament dated anno 1532, Bristol, 1885, (with facsimile of title-page, two leaves).

== Family ==
In 1833 Fry married Matilda, only daughter of Daniel and Anne Penrose, of Brittas, County Wicklow.
