= Eastern promise =

Eastern promise may refer to:

- Eastern Promise, a species of the genus Sorbus of trees and shrubs
- Eastern Promises, a 2007 gangster film directed by David Cronenberg

Full of Eastern Promise may refer to:

- "Full of Eastern Promise", a slogan used in adverts for the chocolate sweet Fry's Turkish Delight
- "Full of Eastern Promise", nickname for Hong Kong snooker player Marco Fu (born 1978)
