= Jane Lumb =

British actress and model (1942–2008)

- Born: 23 November 1942; Mytholmroyd, West Riding of Yorkshire, England
- Died: 8 February 2008 (aged 65); London, England
- Occupations: Fashion model; actress
- Spouse: Tony Gourvish (m. 1976)
- Children: 1 daughter

Jane Katherine Lumb (23 November 1942 – 8 February 2008) was an English fashion model and actress in the 1960s. She appeared in a series of advertisements for Fry's Turkish Delight.

== Background ==
Lumb was born in Mytholmroyd, near Hebden Bridge, West Riding of Yorkshire. Her father was a mill owner. Lumb was educated at a private boarding school where her unruly behaviour tended to mask her academic ability. She passed 4 A levels at the age of 17 and won a place at Oxford University to read English, but never took this up, having attended a tutorial college for a year, from where she absconded with a medical student. In the 1970s, Lumb took an English degree from the Open University.

== Swinging Sixties ==
Lumb found work as a fashion model, appearing in the first international edition of the Pirelli Calendar in 1964, for which she was photographed by Robert Freeman on a beach in Mallorca. Her friends during the "Swinging Sixties", of which she has been described as "one of the iconic faces", included models Twiggy and Paulene Stone. According to the Liverpool Daily Post over forty years later, Lumb had "long legs, a short skirt, a come-hither pout, a rich dad and a boarding school voice".

Lumb mixed in musical circles, appearing in a promotional film for the Rolling Stones' song "Ruby Tuesday". Other film credits included Goldfinger (1964), Carry On Cleo (1964), Carry On Spying (1964), Dr. Who and the Daleks (uncredited, 1965) and a fleeting appearance in Joe Massot's 13-minute short Reflections on Love (1966), with Jenny Boyd, whose sister Pattie had married George Harrison after meeting him on the set of A Hard Day's Night. Lumb appeared in television advertisements for Fry's Turkish Delight. She was in the heart of the London pop scene by dating Tony Hicks, lead guitarist for The Hollies.

Lumb posed again for Pirelli in 1973, the calendar for that year being shot by Brian Duffy, one of a group of 1960s photographers, including David Bailey and Terence Donovan, whom Pattie Boyd has referred to as "rock 'n' rollers without the music". Photographer Philip Townsend described Lumb as among the "top five" on any photographer's list of subjects in the 1960s.

== Family ==
In 1976, she married Tony Gourvish, a manager in the music business; they had one child, a daughter.

== Later work ==
Lumb was later involved in public relations, working with, among others, the bands Showaddywaddy and the Bay City Rollers. She also represented the chef Anton Mosimann.

== Death ==
Jane Lumb died from breast cancer in 2008, aged 65. The Times noted in its obituary that she had prided herself on her ability to complete its crossword.

== Filmography ==
- Carry on Spying (1964) - Amazon Guard (uncredited)
- A Hard Day's Night (1964) - Minor Role (uncredited)
- Carry On Cleo (1964) - Vestal Virgin (uncredited)
- Goldfinger (1964) - Miami Pool Girl (uncredited)
- Dr. Who and the Daleks (1965) - Thal
