= Fry's Chocolate Cream =

Brand of chocolate bar

- Product type: Chocolate bar
- Current owner: Cadbury
- Country: United Kingdom
- Introduced: 1866; 160 years ago
- Related brands: Fry's Peppermint Cream; Fry's Orange Cream
- Markets: United Kingdom and Ireland
- Previous owners: J. S. Fry & Sons
- Website: cadbury.co.uk/fryschocolatecream

Fry's Chocolate Cream is a chocolate bar developed by J. S. Fry & Sons and currently manufactured by Cadbury. Launched in 1866—nineteen years after Fry's introduced eating chocolate in Great Britain (in 1847)—Fry's Chocolate Cream is the world's oldest combination bar brand still in existence. (Note: It has been claimed that Fry's Chocolate Cream was the first mass-produced combination bar, although similar confections were already manufactured at the time.)

Technically considered a combination bar because it combines chocolate with other ingredients, the original Fry's Chocolate Cream chocolate bar consisted of a plain fondant centre enrobed in plain chocolate. Variants include Peppermint Cream and Orange Cream.

In the 1960s, Fry's Chocolate Cream was advertised on British television by the model George Lazenby who became famous as "The Big Fry" man—the ads rivalled Cadbury Milk Tray advertised by the "Milk Tray Man"—a role which saw Lazenby catch the attention of the James Bond producers.

== History ==
The making of chocolate creams in 1898

Fry's Chocolate Cream was first produced in 1866 and is considered the direct descendant of Fry's Cream Stick produced in 1853, which was probably inspired by French chocolates; similar chocolats à la crème made with fondant were sold by chocolatiers at the time. Fry's chocolate creams were produced in various shapes and typically sold in fancy boxes. In the early 20th century, chocolate creams were still made by coating pre-formed sugar centres, moulded in starch, with chocolate. The making and packaging of chocolate cream confections was generally carried out by female employees.

It has been claimed that Fry's Chocolate Cream was remoulded into the shape it retains today in 1875. However, this seems unlikely, as chocolate confections (other than plain bars) continued to be made by hand until the early 20th century. A description dating from 1898 suggests that Fry’s chocolate creams most commonly came in a square format. Fry's 'Chocolate Cream Tablets' were sold by weight in the late 19th century and as individual items by the 1920s.

In the 1920s, following its merger with Cadbury, Fry's production was transferred to the new Somerdale Factory. The foil wrapping and label were introduced in 1925. During production, it once exceeded half a million units per day. The Orange Cream and Peppermint Cream, followed by Fry's Five Centre, were introduced in 1934.

In the Second World War, British bomber crews in the RAF Bomber Command were regularly issued with Fry's Chocolate Creams before missions.

In 2022, skimmed milk powder was added to the list of ingredients due to trace residue left on manufacturing equipment. Cadbury UK clarified that there had been no change to the recipe.

== Products and branding ==
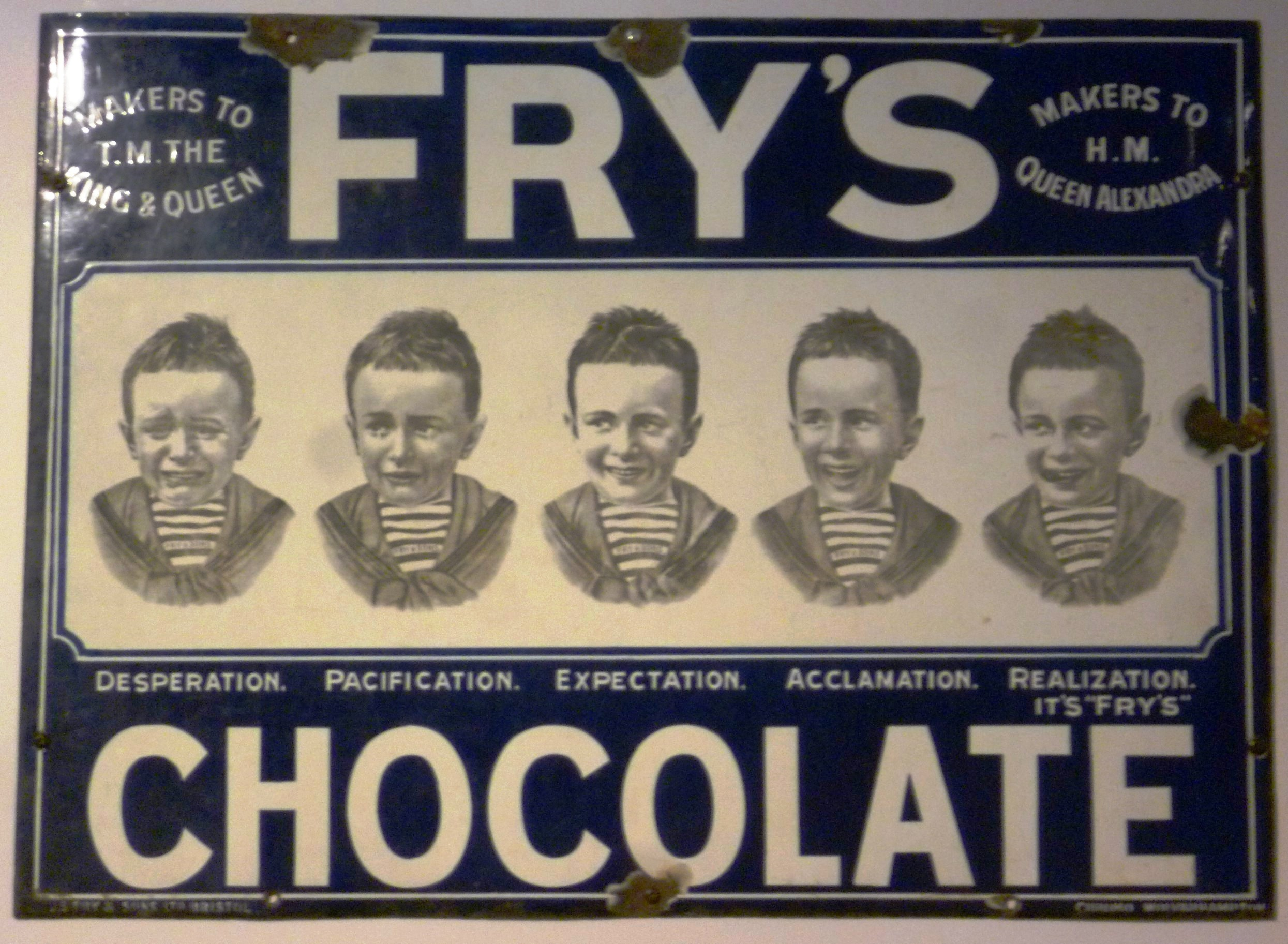
Enamel sign advertising Fry's Chocolate, pre-1925

There are currently three variants of Fry's Cream:

- Fry's Chocolate Cream
- Fry's Peppermint Cream
- Fry's Orange Cream (Discontinued 2015, relaunched 2018)

Discontinued variants include:

- Fry's Raspberry Cream
- Fry's Strawberry Cream (Relaunched 2020 Limited edition)
- Fry's Pineapple Cream
- Fry's Coffee Cream
- Fry's Five Centres (orange, raspberry, lime, strawberry, and pineapple), produced from 1934 to 1992. Originally named Five Centre, Five Centres was also sold with a combination of orange, coffee, vanilla, lime, and raspberry centres. Other combinations were sold at one time or another; for example, one reproduction 1950s advert shows a blackcurrant flavoured segment in place of vanilla. The Five Centre bar was renamed Fruit Medley during the 1960s, but this was later reversed.

An unsuccessful mid-1990s relaunch attempt also saw new variants available under the modernised "Fry's Spirit" branding for a while:

- Fry's Spirit Berry Margarita
- Fry's Spirit Piña Colada
- Fry's Spirit Velvet Dream (cream liqueur)

Cadbury also produced a solid milk chocolate bar called Five Boys using the Fry's trademark from 1902 until 1976. Cadbury produced milk and plain chocolate sandwich bars under the Fry's branding also.

In 2021, Fry's launched a hot chocolate powder which can be blended with milk.

In the 1960s Frys did a small Easter Egg that always rivalled Cadburys Creme Egg that split in 2 halves and had a yolk with a very special flavour.

== Lazenby commercials ==
In the 1960s, Fry's Chocolate Cream was advertised by model George Lazenby as 'The Big Fry' man, making him a celebrity in the UK. The television commercials rivalled Cadbury Milk Tray which has been advertised by the 'Milk Tray Man'. Dyson Lowell, a casting director for James Bond, saw the Fry commercials and contacted Bond producer Harry Saltzman in the belief Lazenby could be groomed for the role of 007. Lazenby later portrayed James Bond in On Her Majesty's Secret Service, in 1969.

== Location and ownership ==
The Fry's chocolate bar was first produced in Union Street, Bristol, England in 1866, where the family name had been associated with chocolate making since c. 1761. In 1923, Fry's (now Cadbury) chocolate factory moved to Somerdale Garden City, Keynsham, England.

Following a 2010 takeover of Cadbury plc by Kraft Foods, the Somerdale factory was closed on 31 March 2011 and its machinery shipped to Warsaw, Poland. Then, after acquisition of Cadbury by Mondelez International production was relocated and Warsaw plant became part of Lotte Wedel.

== See also ==
- List of chocolate bar brands
