= William Rufus Chetwood =

English or Anglo-Irish publisher, writer and bookseller

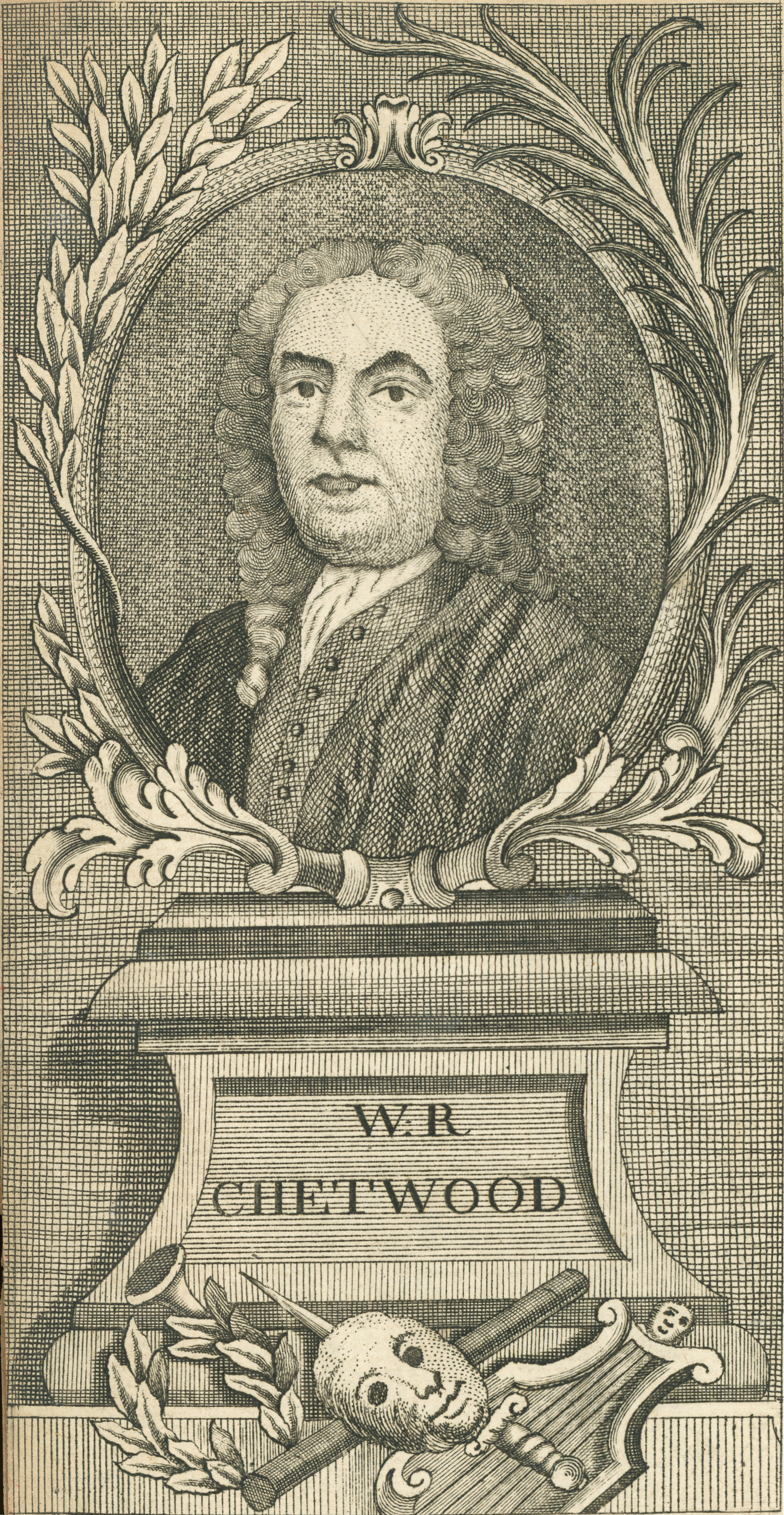
William Rufus Chetwood, Frontispiece to the 1749 edition of his History of the stage

William Rufus Chetwood (died 1766) was an English or Anglo-Irish publisher and bookseller, and a prolific writer of plays and adventure novels. He also penned a valuable General History of the Stage.

== Publishing and prompting ==
Nothing certain is known of Chetwood's early life, but he may have spent an extended period at sea. In 1713 he appeared as the publisher of A Poem on the Memorable Fall of Chloe's P—s Pot (attributed to Jonathan Swift). In the following year he was acting as assistant manager to Joseph Ashbury's theatre company in Dublin. His first published writing appears to have been a Life of Lady Jane Grey, published in Dublin in 1715. By June 1715 he was prompter at the Theatre Royal, Drury Lane, which he remained for much of the following twenty years.

Chetwood soon built up a business as a publisher and bookseller, operating alone or in conjunction with other firms. His frequent publishing partners included Barnaby Bernard Lintot, John Watts, William Mears, and James Roberts, on ventures that included several Shakespeare plays, almost every new London play between 1719 and 1722, Daniel Defoe's Moll Flanders and Colonel Jack, Colley Cibber's collected plays, and many of Eliza Haywood's novels. Meanwhile, he published alone plays by Theophilus Cibber, Thomas D'Urfey and Thomas Doggett, Richard Savage's memoirs of Theophilus Keene, and Haywood's novel Love in Excess.

== Plays and novels ==
Early plays written by Chetwood – South-Sea, or, The Biter Bit and The Stock-Jobbers, or, The Humours of Exchange Alley – were published but remained unperformed. Chetwood also published two novels almost certainly by him: The Voyages, Dangerous Adventures, and Imminent Escapes of Captain R. Falconer and the 1726 Voyages and Adventures of Captain Robert Boyle, which remained in print at least until the mid-19th century. His first work to be performed on stage was The Lovers' Opera (1729), an adaptation of Susanna Centlivre's A Bold Stroke for a Wife (1718). This went through at least three published editions and was also performed on the Dublin stage in 1736.

Four further stage works followed: The Stage Coach Opera, 1730; The Generous Free Mason, 1730; The Emperor of China, Grand Volgi, 1731, but unpublished; and The Mock Mason, a ballad opera, 1733. However, these seem to have earned him little and records of later plays are scanty. A further novel, The Voyages, Travels and Adventures of Captain W. O. G. Vaughan, appeared in 1736.

== Marriages and debts ==
Chetwood had a daughter by an early marriage, Richabella, (fl. 1738–1771), who became an actress and married an Irish actor, Tobias Gemea. His second marriage, on 15 June 1738 at St Benet's, Paul's Wharf, London, was to the actress Anne Brett (1720 – c. 1760), a granddaughter of Colley Cibber. They had two daughters, both of whom died in early childhood in the 1740s.

This second marriage may have contributed to severe financial difficulties by 1741, when a benefit performance of William Congreve's The Old Bachelor was given for him at Covent Garden. A collection called Five New Novels appeared in the same year. There are mentions of him working in Dublin in 1741 and 1744, and Belfast (with his daughter) in 1753. At the end of the decade there appeared his General History of the Stage (1749), which includes valuable accounts of the contemporary London and Dublin theatre. Other efforts to make a living included A Tour through Ireland (1748, with Philip Luckombe) and a poem called Kilkenny, or, The Old Man's Wish (1748). His British Theatre (1750) includes a list of Shakespeare quartos, of which several are spurious.

Chetwood died on 3 March 1766, probably in a debtors' prison: The Marshalsea, Dublin.
