= Fry's Turkish Delight =

Chocolate bar by Cadbury

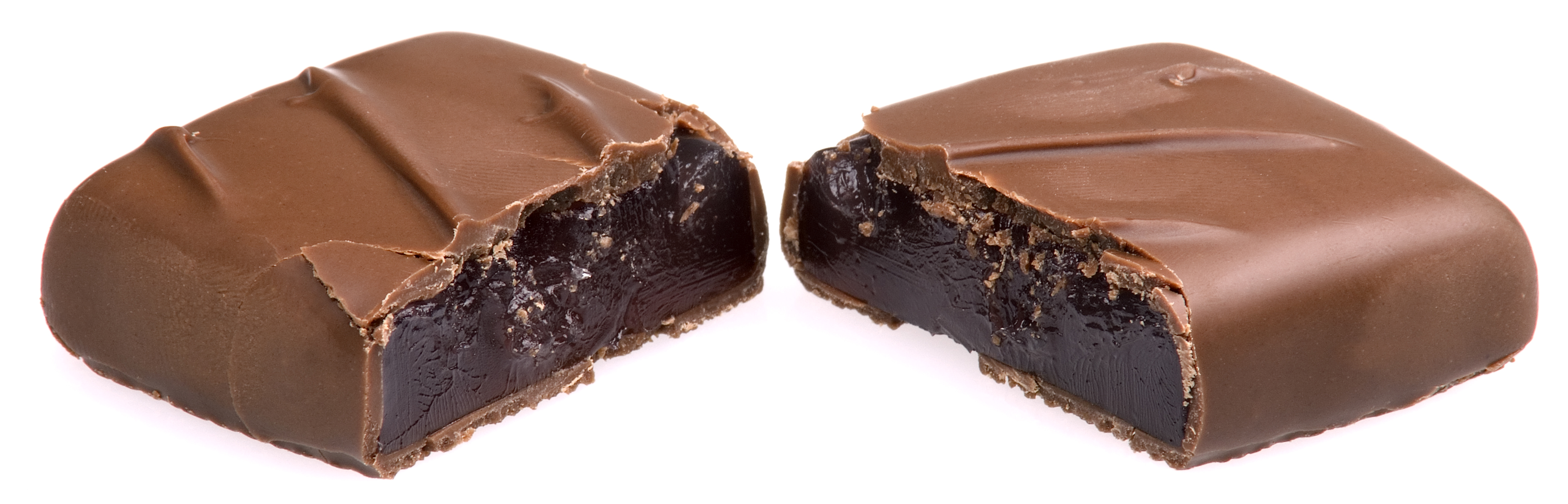
- Product type: Chocolate bar
- Current owner: Mondelez International
- Produced by: Cadbury
- Country: United Kingdom
- Introduced: 1914; 112 years ago
- Previous owners: J. S. Fry & Sons (1914–19)
- Website: cadbury.co.uk/frysturkishdelight

Fry's Turkish Delight is a chocolate bar made by British confectionary company Cadbury, consisting of a rose-flavoured Turkish delight surrounded by milk chocolate. It was launched by Bristol-based J. S. Fry & Sons in 1914 which merged with Cadbury in 1919 but with Fry's identity remaining in use for the product.

From August 2010, Fry's Turkish Delight (along with other products such as Fry's Chocolate Cream) for the British and Irish markets are produced in Poland after the decommissioning of Somerdale Factory. Those sold in Australia and New Zealand are manufactured by Cadbury in Australia.

== Variations ==
Alongside the standard product, a number of variations have been marketed. Cadbury also manufacture the Dairy Milk Turkish, using Cadbury Dairy Milk chocolate instead with a slightly different Turkish centre, in the familiar block bar form. It was first launched in 2005 and is now sold only in Ireland. In 2020 and 2021, limited edition Lemon and Cherry flavoured Turkish Delights were launched in Britain, and more recently an Orange variant.

In Australia and New Zealand, the range of "Turkish" products released by Cadbury has expanded to include mini-Easter eggs, ice cream, sectioned family block chocolate bars, and small versions used in boxed chocolates.

== Advertising ==
From the late 1950s, the slogan 'Full of Eastern Promise' has been used for the product on British TV advertisements. Among those appearing in such advertisements in the 1960s were the model and actress Jane Lumb. In 2000, ‘Eastern Promise’ was ranked 37th in Channel 4’s poll of the "100 Greatest Adverts".

Due to the Orientalist perspective and misleading stereotypes about the Turks, the advertisements have depicted Turkey as the Arabian Desert and Turks as Arab Bedouins.

== See also ==
- List of chocolate bar brands
