= Joseph Storrs Fry =

English chocolate and confectionery manufacturer (1767–1835)

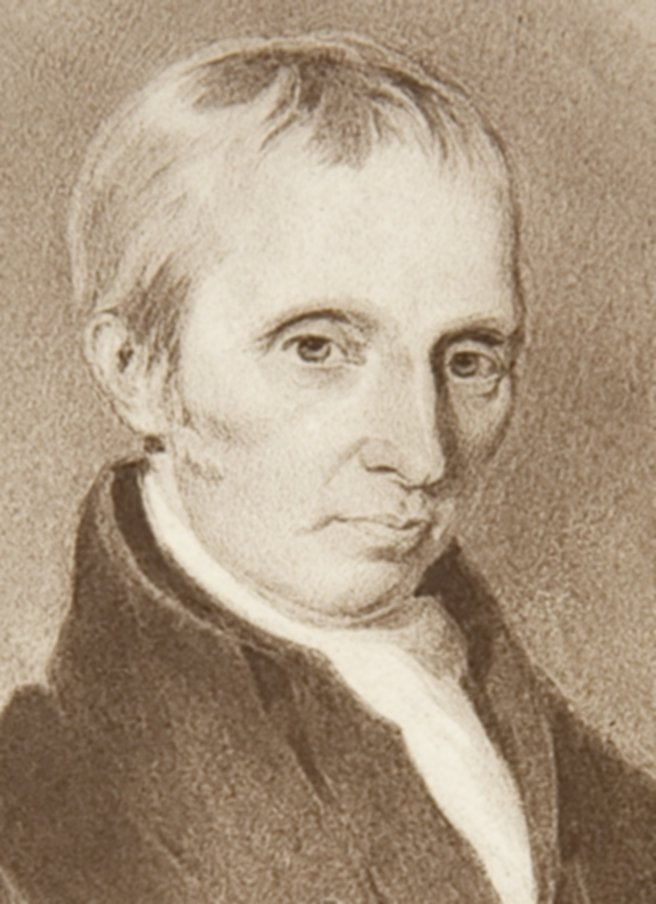
Joseph Storrs Fry (1769-1835)

Joseph Storrs Fry (1767–1835) was an English chocolate and confectionery manufacturer and a member of the Fry Family of Bristol, England.

== Early life ==
He was born in 1767, son of Joseph Fry (1728–1787), in business as a manufacturer of chocolate and of soap, and as a type founder, and his wife Anna, daughter of Dr Henry Portsmouth, of Basingstoke, Hampshire. His father had started a number of businesses including an experimental chocolate factory, Fry, Vaughan and Company.

== Career ==
In 1795, he assumed control of his parents' chocolate business, now known as Anna Fry & Sons. He created the first chocolate bar and patented a method of grinding cocoa beans using a Watt steam engine resulting in factory techniques being introduced into the cocoa business, building a plant in Union Street, Bristol. He moved to Grove House (now Riverwood House), Frenchay in 1800. In 1803, his mother, Anna Fry, died and Joseph Storrs Fry partnered with a Dr Hunt and renamed the business Fry & Hunt. He married Ann Allen (1764?–1829) and had seven children.

Dr Hunt retired in 1822 and Joseph Storrs Fry took his sons, Joseph (1795–1879), Francis (1867

–1886) and Richard (1807–1878) on as partners renaming the firm J. S. Fry & Sons under which name it became the largest commercial producer of chocolate in Britain.

== Death ==
Fry died in 1835, and was buried behind the Frenchay Quaker Meeting House along with his wife Ann and his daughter Priscilla. He left three sons, Joseph, Francis and Richard. They took control of the firm, and it ultimately passed to his grandson Joseph Storrs Fry II (1826–1913).

== In fiction ==
Joseph Fry and his family feature as characters in Sara Sheridan's novel On Starlit Seas (2025)
