= Milk Tray =

Brand of boxed chocolates

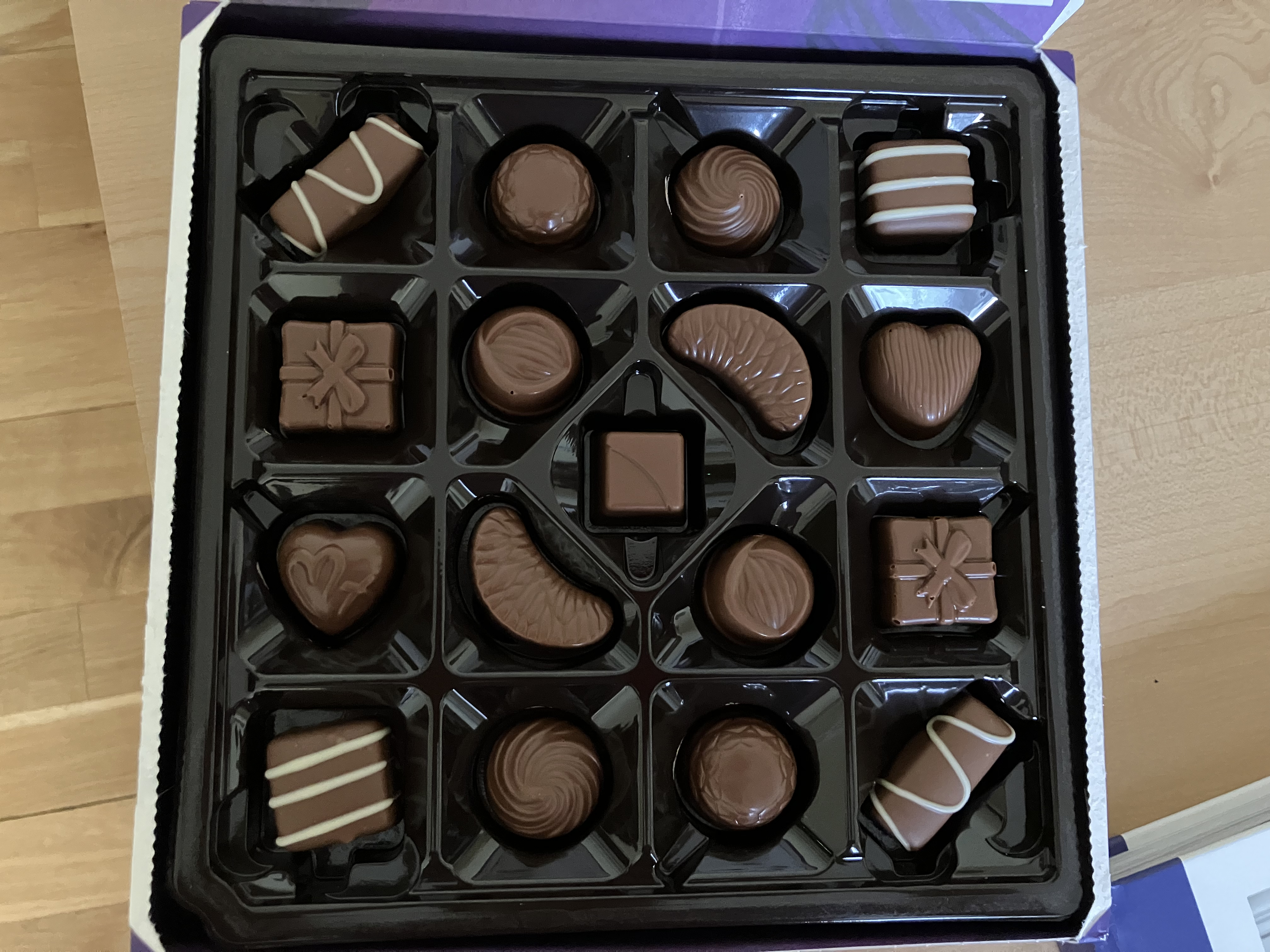
- Cadbury Milk Tray
- Product type: Confectionery; Chocolate
- Current owner: Cadbury
- Country: United Kingdom
- Introduced: 1915
- Related brands: List of Cadbury products
- Markets: World

Milk Tray is a British brand of boxed chocolates currently manufactured by Cadbury. Introduced in the United Kingdom in 1915, it is one of the longest running brands in the confectioner's portfolio. Milk Tray is also sold in Australia, Canada, Ireland, New Zealand and South Africa.

The name 'Tray' derived from the way in which the original assortment was delivered to the shops. Originally Milk Tray was packed in five and a half pound boxes, arranged on trays from which it was sold loose to customers.

The pack design has been regularly updated and the assortment itself has changed in line with consumer preferences, and today it is still one of the most popular boxes of chocolates in the UK selling over 8 million boxes per annum.

From 1968 to 2003, and since 2016, the chocolate is advertised on television by the 'Milk Tray Man', a tough James Bond–style figure who undertakes daunting 'raids' to surreptitiously deliver a box of Milk Tray chocolates to a lady. The original tagline was And all because the lady loves Milk Tray. A YouGov poll saw them ranked the 16th most famous confectionery in the UK.

== History ==
In 1916 a half pound deep-lidded box was introduced with a purple background and gold script, which has undergone minor changes in the century since it was introduced. In 1924 a one-pound box was introduced, and by the mid-1930s the Cadbury's Milk Tray assortment was outselling all its competitors. It has remained one of the most popular boxes of chocolates in the UK where it sells over 8 million boxes per annum.

== Current selection ==
Raspberries & Cream: White cream filling with raspberry pieces covered in milk chocolate.

Caramel Softy: Milk chocolate with caramel interior.

Hazelnut Swirl: A whole roasted hazelnut in a whirl of milk chocolate.

Honey Crunch: Honey flavour milk chocolate truffle with crunchy pieces.

Fudge Duet: Vanilla flavour fudge covered with milk chocolate.

Orange Truffle: Orange segment-shaped chocolate truffle with a hint of orange flavour, enrobed in milk chocolate.

Perfect Praline: Milk chocolate with a soft praline centre.

Salted Caramel Charm: Chewy caramel enrobed in sea salt and milk chocolate with a drizzle of white chocolate.

Truffle Heart: Milk chocolate with a soft cocoa truffle filling.

White Truffle: A white chocolate truffle wrapped in milk chocolate.

== Discontinued varieties ==
Exotic Delight: Milk chocolate with Turkish delight jelly filling, previously known as the Turkish Delight, it was renamed in 2013 and dropped from the selection in late 2015 as part of a 100th anniversary revamp of the design and chocolate selection. The "Exotic Delight" was replaced with the "Apple Crunch".

Toffee Charm: Chewy toffee enrobed in milk chocolate drizzled with white chocolate. Re-formulated as "Salted Caramel Charm".

Nutty Heart: Milk chocolate with a soft caramel centre enrobing a whole roasted hazelnut. Due to complaints about the selection having too many chocolates containing both nuts and caramel, the "Nutty Heart" is now filled with a smooth cocoa truffle filling and has been renamed "Truffle Heart".

Lime Cordial, also known as "the wee barrel" because of the shape. The shape was continued and replaced with toffee filling which has also since disappeared.

Apple Crunch: Apple flavour white chocolate truffle with cinnamon crunch.

Strawberry Temptation: Milk chocolate with a smooth strawberry filling and a layer of vanilla creme. Called "Strawberry Temptation" until 2015.

Surprise Parcel: Milk chocolate with a smooth white chocolate truffle centre.

=== Chocolate bar ===
Between 1947 and 1981 a Milk Tray Bar was available which featured 8 different centres.

== Milk Tray Man ==
From 1968 to 2003, and since 2016, the chocolate is advertised on television by the 'Milk Tray Man', a tough James Bond–style figure who undertakes daunting 'raids' to surreptitiously deliver a box of Milk Tray chocolates to a lady. The original tagline was And all because the lady loves Milk Tray.

Actor Gary Myers, who is most recognisable as the action figure, starred in 11 or 14 of the commercials between 1968 and 1984. James Coombes assumed the role in 1987. Kidderminster born actor Alan Riley was the Milk Tray man in 2003, in an advert which featured actress Sienna Guillory. Coombes assumed the role again in 2016. A memorable scene of the man jumping from a cliff top into the sea was performed by stuntman Alf Joint who had previously doubled for Sean Connery’s 007 in Goldfinger (1964). Martin Grace, Roger Moore's stunt double in the James Bond films, performed stunts for some of the early Milk Tray commercials, including leaping from a bridge onto a speeding train and climbing dangerously along the roof.

The music, The Night Rider, was written by Cliff Adams, who also wrote the music for Fry's Turkish Delight advertisements. The music was recorded commercially by Alan Hawkshaw on the album "27 Top TV Themes" (Studio 2 Stereo, 1972). This album has been re-released on CD (EMI 7234 4 98171 2 8). Alan Hawkshaw was the pianist on the original sessions with Cliff Adams, for the advertisements. A medley of three separate arrangements of the theme, based on the authentic scores as used in the commercials from 1968 to 2010, is commercially available, performed by London Music Works, on the album "Great British TV Themes" (SILCD 1357).

For the campaign from 1970 to 1974, Peter Wyngarde was the voice for the line 'And all because the lady loves Milk Tray'.

The entire campaign of television advertisements ranked at number 11 on ITV's "Best Ads Ever" list in 2005. The specific Avalanche advert ranked at number 48 in Channel 4's UK wide poll of "The 100 Greatest TV Ads" in 2000.

== See also ==
- Black Magic (chocolates)
