= J. S. Fry & Sons =

British chocolate brand and manufacturer

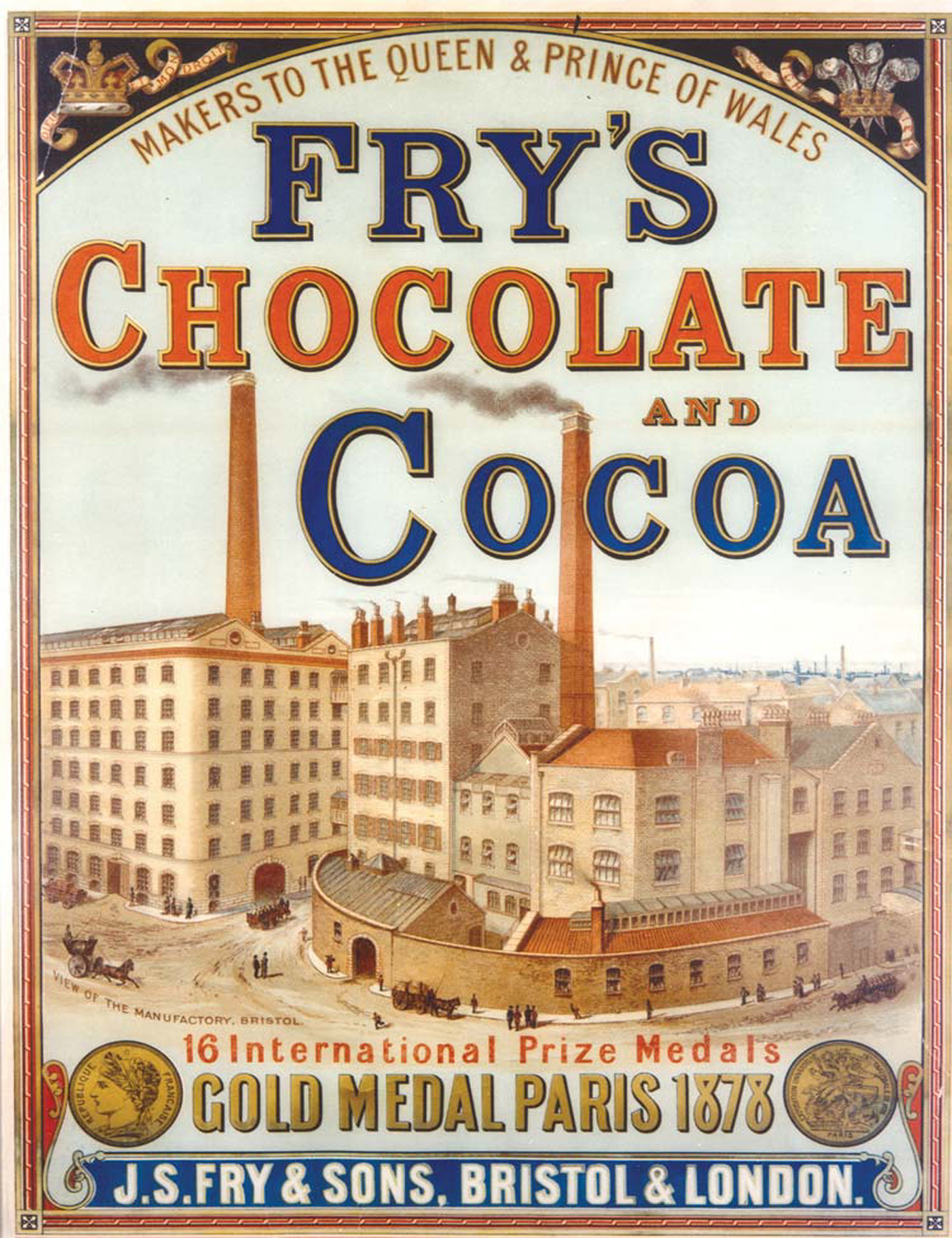
- Advertisement for the 1878 Paris Exposition
- Formerly: Fry, Vaughan & Co (1761–1787); Anna Fry & Son (1787–1822)
- Type: Private (1761–1919)
- Industry: Confectionery
- Founded: 1761 in Bristol
- Founder: Joseph Fry
- Defunct: 2010; 16 years ago
- Fate: Merged with Cadbury Brothers (1919); Loss of operational independence (1967); Original factory closed (2011)
- Headquarters: Keynsham, United Kingdom
- Key people: Joseph Storrs Fry II
- Products: Chocolate
- Brands: Chocolate Cream; Turkish Delight
- Parent: Cadbury (1919–2010)

J. S. Fry & Sons, Ltd. was a British chocolate company owned by Joseph Storrs Fry and his family. Beginning in Bristol in 1761, the business went through several changes of name and ownership, becoming J. S. Fry & Sons in 1822. In 1847, Fry's produced what is often considered the first solid chocolate bar in Britain. The company also created the first filled chocolate sweet, Cream Sticks, in 1853. Fry is most famous for Fry's Chocolate Cream, the first mass-produced chocolate bar, which was launched in 1866, and Fry's Turkish Delight, launched in 1914.

Fry, alongside Cadbury and Rowntree's, was one of the big three British confectionery manufacturers throughout much of the 19th and 20th centuries, and all three companies were founded by Quakers. The company became a division of Cadbury in 1919 after a merger between the two companies. The division's Somerdale Factory near Bristol was closed after the 2010 takeover of Cadbury's by Kraft Foods Inc.

== History ==
=== Early history ===
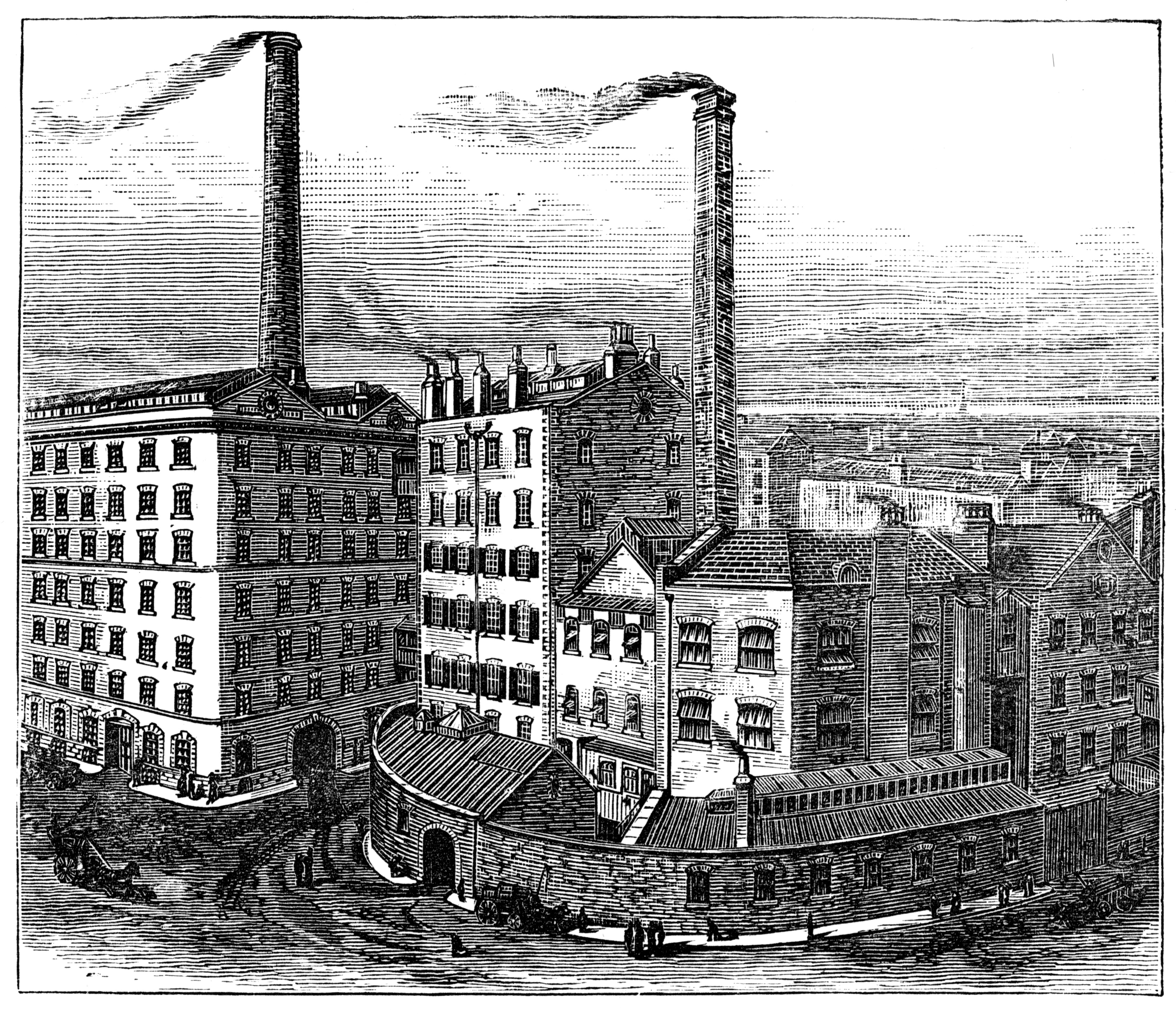
Fry and Sons Manufactory, Nelson Street, Bristol, 1882

Joseph Fry, a Quaker, was born in 1728. He started making chocolate around 1759. In 1761, Fry and John Vaughan purchased a small shop from an apothecary, Walter Churchman, and with it the patent for a chocolate refining process. The company was then named Fry, Vaughan & Co. In 1777 the chocolate works moved from Newgate Street to Union Street, Bristol. Joseph Fry died in 1787 and the company was renamed Anna Fry & Son. In 1795 Joseph Storrs Fry assumed control of the company. He patented a method of grinding cocoa beans using a Watt steam engine, and as a result, factory techniques were introduced into the cocoa business.

In 1803, Anna Fry died and Joseph Storrs Fry partnered with a Dr. Hunt. The business was renamed Fry & Hunt. In 1822 Hunt retired and Joseph Storrs Fry took on his sons Joseph, Francis and Richard as partners: the firm was renamed J. S. Fry & Sons. The company became the largest commercial producer of chocolate in the UK. In 1835, Joseph Storrs Fry died and his sons took full control.

=== Modern history and eating chocolate ===
In the 1820s and 1840s, eating chocolate appeared in Britain. In 1826, Fry introduced chocolate lozenges as a "substitute for food when travelling". "French Eating Chocolate" was also sold by Cadbury as early as 1842.

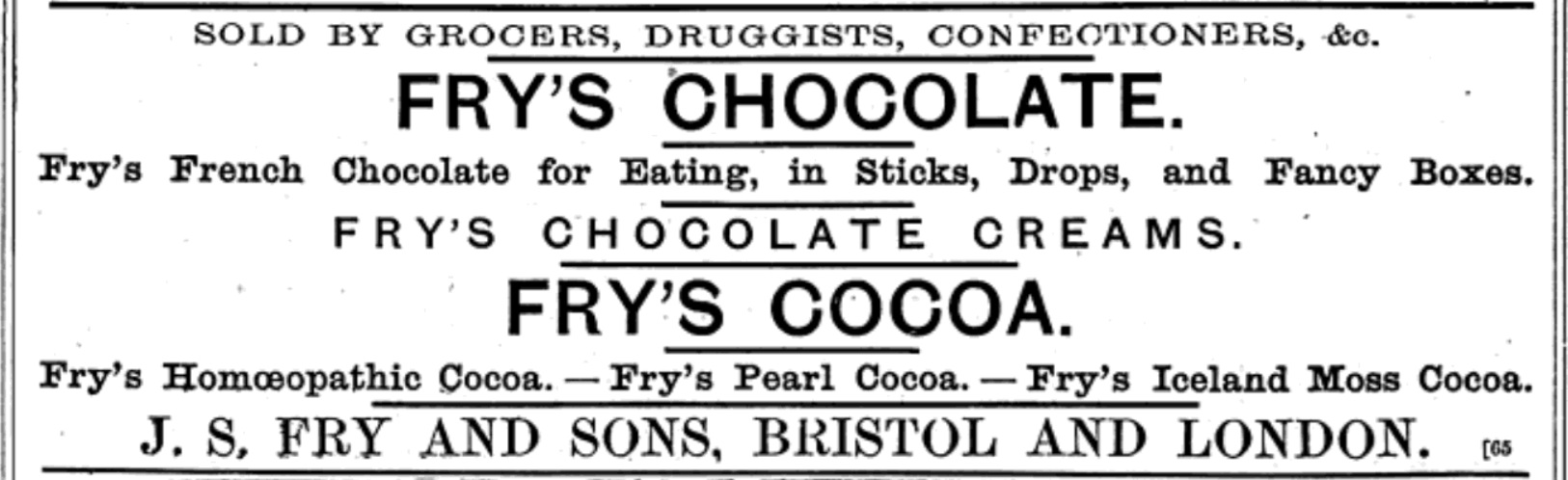
Advertisement for chocolate and cocoa, 1863

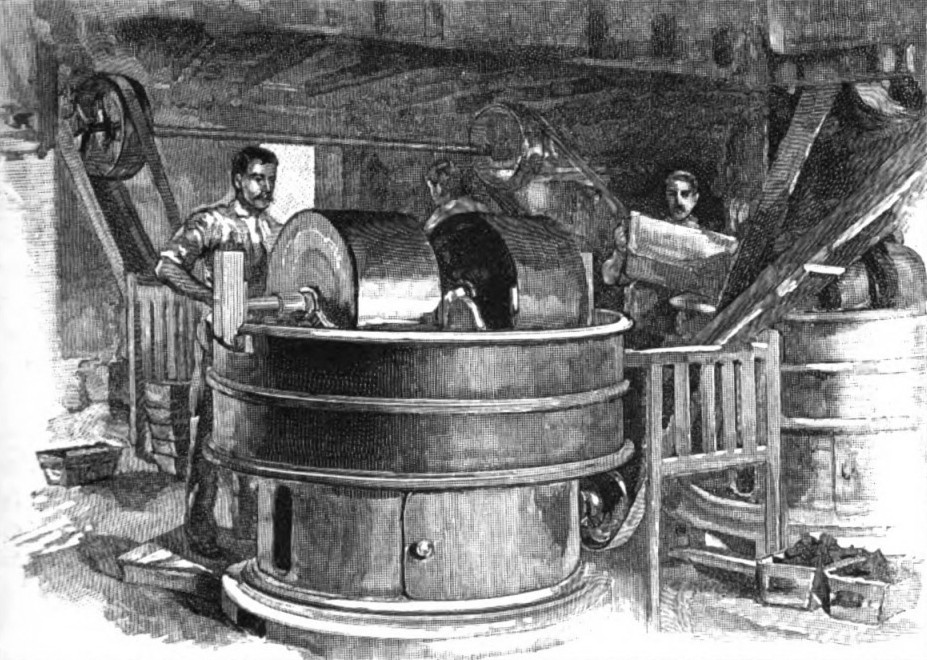
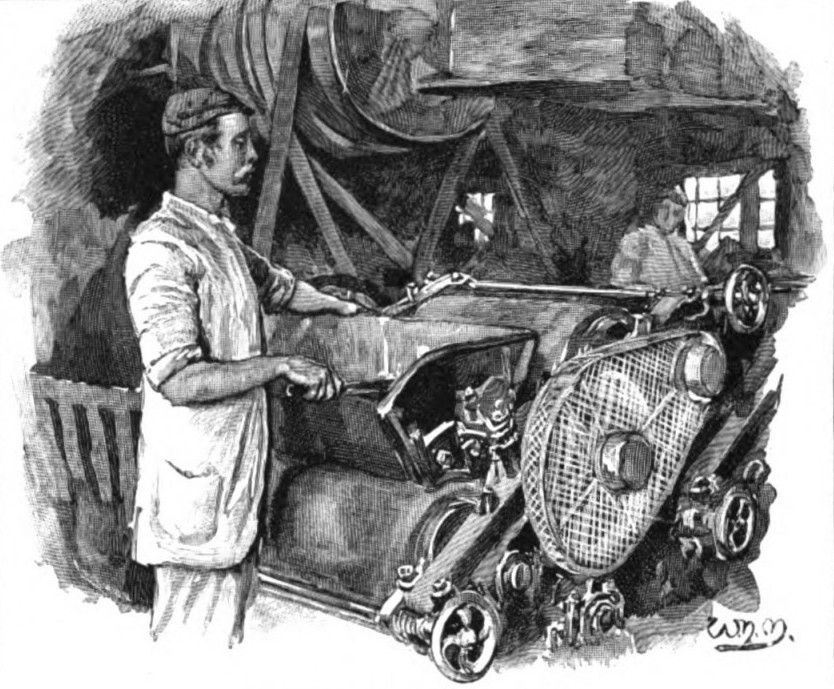
Chocolate-making in the factory, 1892

In 1847, the Fry's chocolate factory produced an eating chocolate bar or confection, widely claimed to be the first of its kind, despite the existence of similar chocolate products in both Britain and France. It was named Chocolat Délicieux à Manger. The firm also began producing various other eating chocolates, leading to the Fry's Chocolate Cream bar in 1866. Although chocolate had been used in confectionery before, this was probably the first mass-produced chocolate candy bar. Over 220 products were introduced in the following decades, including the UK's first chocolate Easter egg in 1873 and Fry's Turkish Delight (or Fry's Turkish bar) in 1914. The production of eating chocolate rose from about 10 tonnes in 1852 to over 1,100 tonnes in 1880; a Van Houten press was acquired and installed in 1868. In 1896, the firm became a registered private company, run by the Fry family, with Joseph Storrs Fry II, grandson of the first Joseph Storrs Fry, as the chairman.

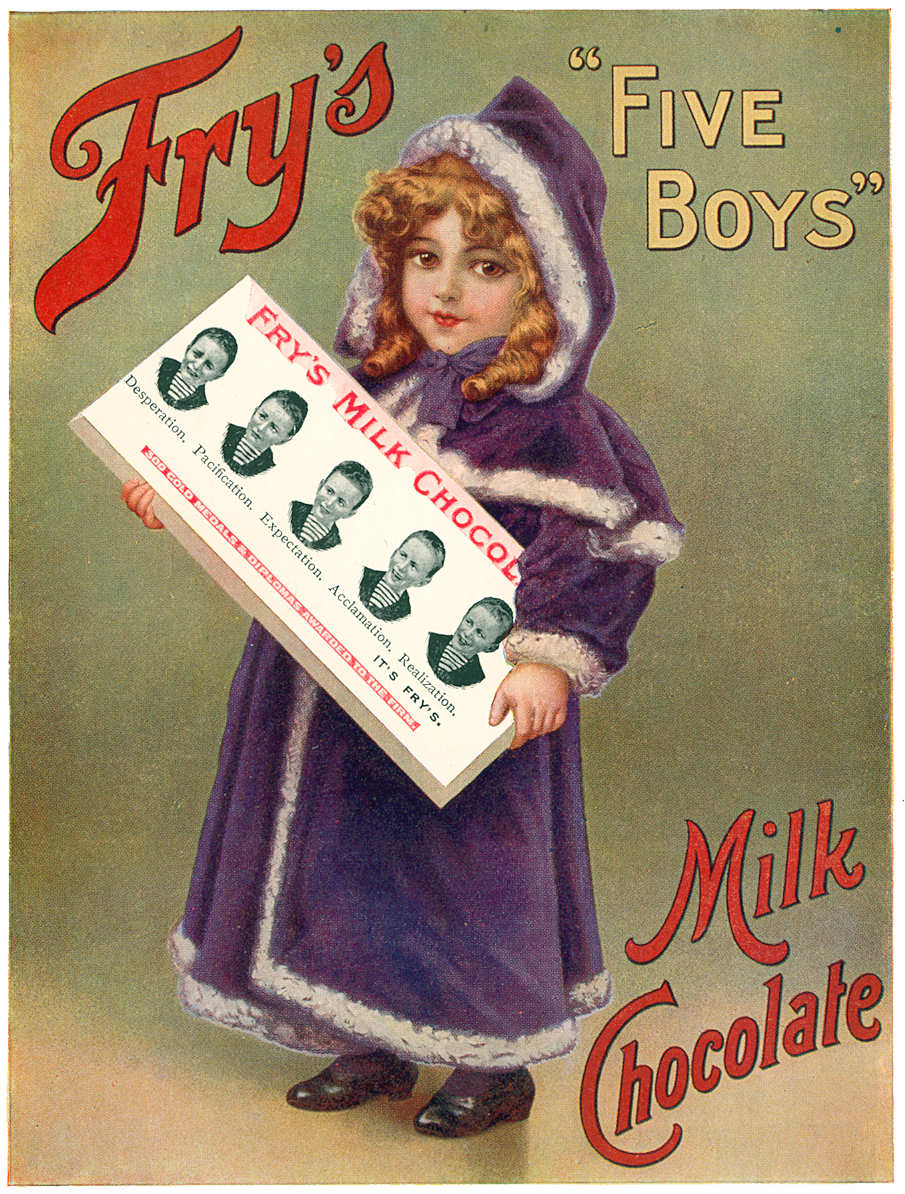
Advertisement c. 1910, "Five Boys" chocolate bar

In 1881, an employee of Fry's, H. J. Packer, established his own chocolate business in Bristol. At its eventual home in Greenbank, Bristol, Packer's Chocolate continued to provide local competition for Fry's until 2006, under various owners and brands, including Bonds and Carsons, and latterly Famous Names and Elizabeth Shaw.

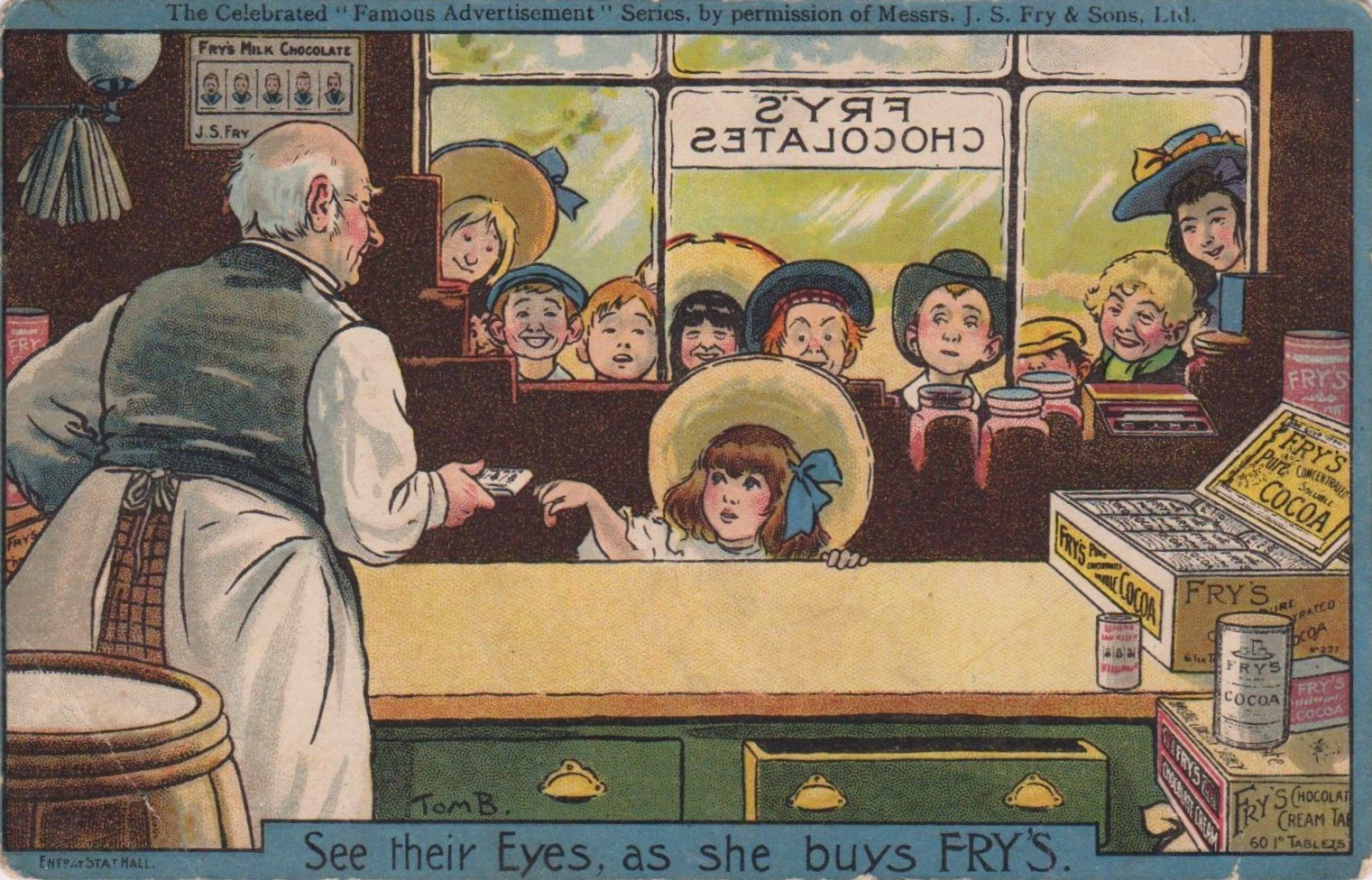
Tom Browne's advertisement postcard for Fry's chocolate, 1912

Near the start of World War I, the company was one of the largest employers in Bristol. Joseph Storrs Fry II died in 1913. In 1919 the company merged with Cadbury's chocolate and the joint company was named British Cocoa and Chocolate Company. After the merger, the Frys held 45.44% of the company's ordinary shares, as well as chairmanship and four seats on the board. Under Egbert Cadbury the Fry's division began from 1923 to move to a new Somerdale factory at Keynsham, just outside Bristol. The Fry family's representation on the company board decreased as the British Cocoa and Chocolate Company expanded operations and opened factories in other countries. By the time Cadbury merged with Schweppes in 1969, only one Fry family member remained on the thirteen-seat company board, and the family held just over 10 percent of the ordinary shares.

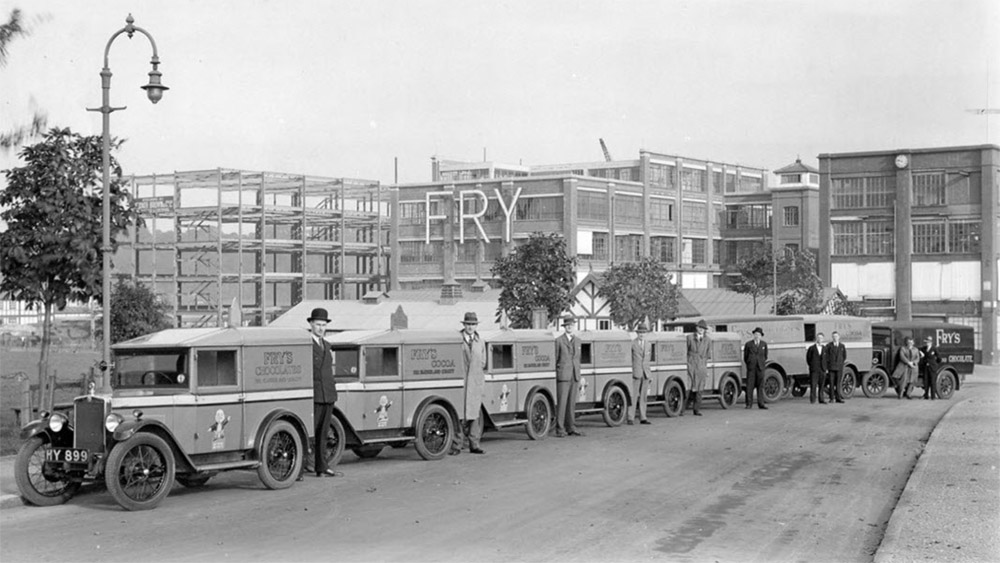
Somerdale Factory, 1930s

After 1981, the name Fry's was no longer in use at Somerdale; however, the factory was still a major producer of Cadbury products.

In October 2007, Cadbury announced plans to close the Somerdale plant, the historic home of the Fry's brand, by 2010 with the loss of some 500 jobs. In an effort to maintain competitiveness in a global marketplace, production was to be moved to a new factory in Poland. Another motivational factor was the high value of the land. Labour MP for Wansdyke, Dan Norris, said, "News of the factory's closure is a hard and heavy blow, not just to the workforce, but to the Keynsham community as a whole".

In February 2010, following the takeover of Cadbury plc by Kraft Foods, the closure was controversially confirmed to take place in 2011; Kraft had agreed during the takeover battle to keep the site open. There was widespread outrage in the press and later a House of Commons Select Committee investigation into the affair.

=== Claims regarding the invention of chocolate ===
Historians have speculated that Fry's may have produced the first solid chocolate intended for eating, or the first chocolate bar, in 1847, as the product was marketed as eating chocolate. It has since been claimed that Fry's "reversed Van Houten's process by adding cocoa butter to cocoa liquor", that "cocoa powder was blended with cocoa butter instead of with warm water", or that "cocoa powder was mixed with its byproduct, cocoa fat". The product has also been described as both successful and unsuccessful. At the 1862 International Exhibition, Fry's described confectionery chocolate as "pure chocolate combined with sugar". Chocolat à manger ("eating chocolate") is described as a French confection in an 1844 encyclopedia.

== Archives ==
Records relating to both the business and the family are held at Bristol Archives (Ref. 38538). Some records concerning the role of J. S. Fry & Sons within Cadbury are held with the Mondelez International repository at Cadbury's UK headquarters in Bournville.

== In popular culture ==
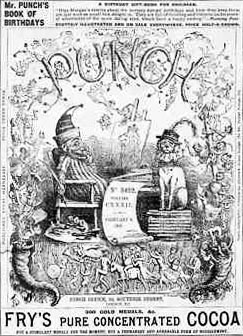
Fry's advertisement in an 1867 edition of Punch magazine

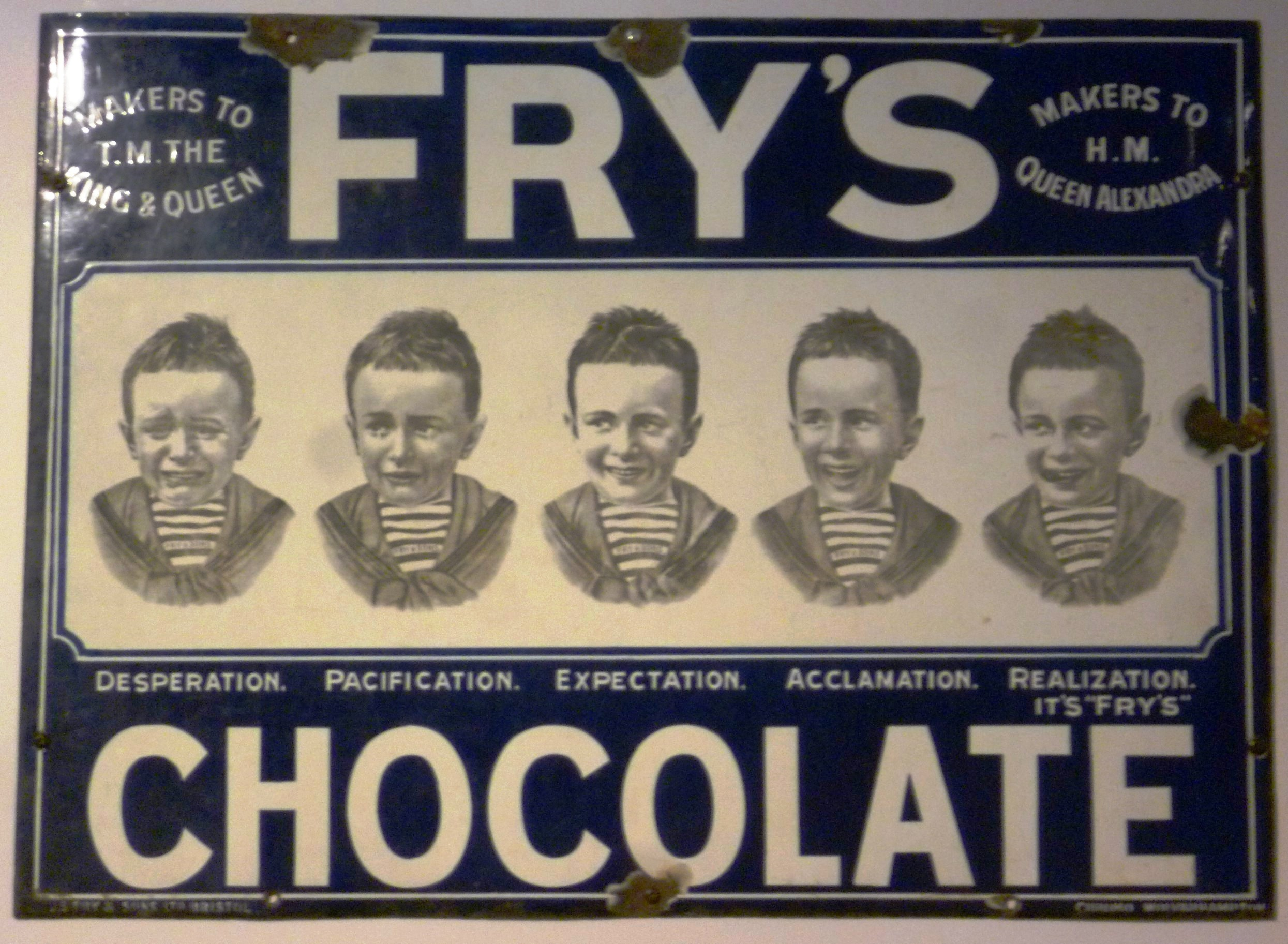
Advertisement with the distinctive "Five Boys", displayed in the Kirkcaldy Museum and Art Gallery

On the BBC television programme Being Human, an old Fry's Cocoa billboard hangs prominently on the side of the B&B where the main characters reside in Series 3–5. The billboard is a nod to the show's original Bristol location.

In April 2020, an original enamel advertising sign with the distinctive "five boys" trademark design was featured on BBC's Antiques Roadshow and was valued at £1,000-£1,500. The distinctive 'five boys' design expressing 'Desperation. Pacification. Expectation. Acclamation. Realization. It's "Fry's"' references Queen Alexandra, indicating a production date before her death in 1925. On a tour of the Fry's Bristol factory when in his eighties, Lindsay Poulton, the boy featured in the design, recalled that his father had induced him to cry, for the first photograph, "Desperation", by wrapping an ammonia-soaked cloth around his neck.

== See also ==
- Fry's Chocolate Cream
- Fry's Turkish Delight
- Crunchie
- Creme Egg
- List of bean-to-bar chocolate manufacturers
- List of Cadbury brands
