= Somerdale Factory =

Factory owned by J.S Fry & Sons and Cadbury and closed by Kraft in 2011

Fry's Somerdale Factory
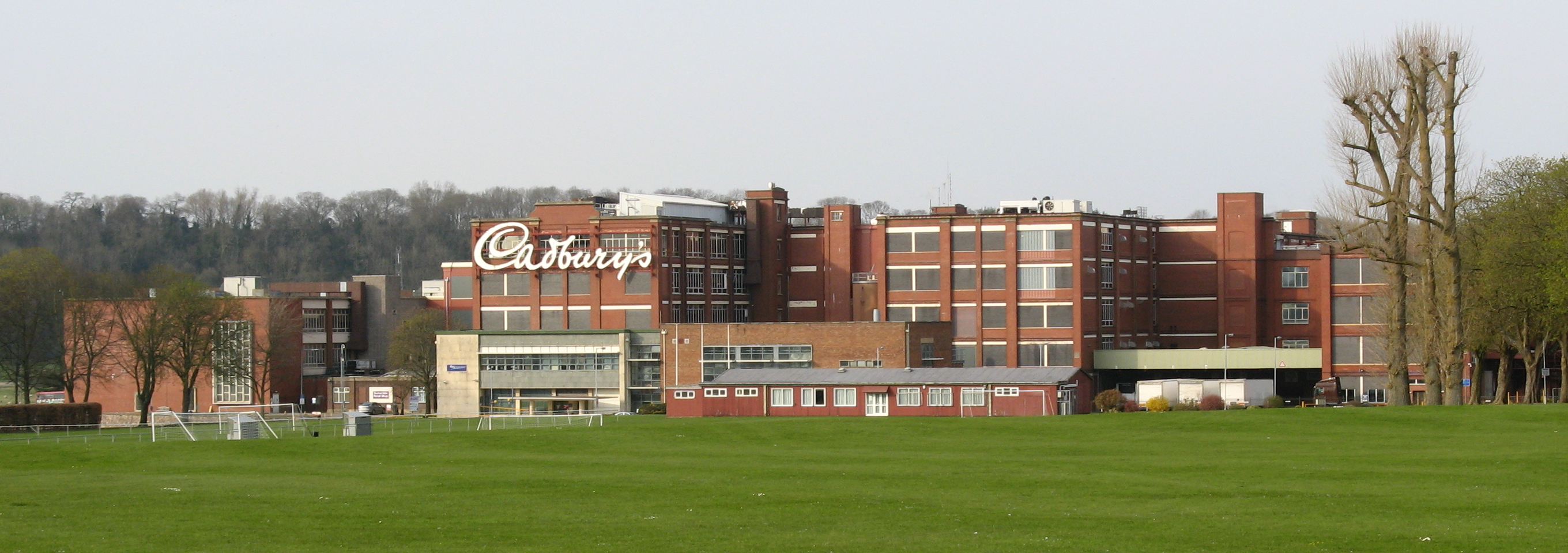

- Location within Somerset

General information
- Coordinates: 51.4231°N 2.4946°W
- Construction started: 1924
- Completed: 1935
- Client: J. S. Fry & Sons
- Owner: Cadbury

Somerdale was a chocolate factory located in Keynsham near Bristol in England. It was the home of a Cadbury plc production facility, and was originally built by the Fry family when they expanded through consolidation of a number of existing facilities located in the centre of Bristol. The factory closed in 2011 after the takeover of Cadbury by Kraft Foods Inc. Existing production was moved to a new factory abroad in Poland.

== History ==
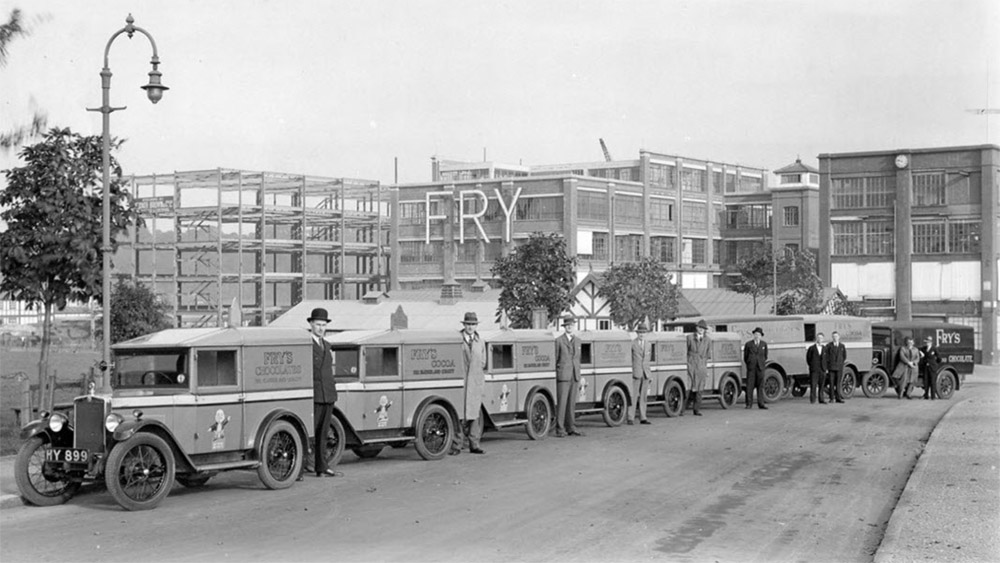
Somerdale Factory soon after opening

After the First World War, Cadbury Brothers undertook a financial merger with J. S. Fry & Sons, which completed in 1919. As a result of the merger, Egbert Cadbury joined the Fry side of the business. Along with Cecil Roderick Fry he was instrumental in the relocation and of the Bristol operations of Fry from Union Street to a 228-acre (0.92 km^{2}) greenfield site called Somerdale Garden City, after a national competition in 1923.

As Quakers, the factory was built with social facilities, including playing fields and a large recreational sports grounds, which still today serves the town of Keynsham. This transfer took 11 years as production was gradually transferred as the modern blocks erected. Finally completed in 1935, at its height the Somerdale workforce was in excess of 5,000. It had its own power station and railway, with connection to the Great Western Railway via sidings at Keynsham railway station. During World War II, with chocolate production reduced due to war time rationing, spare floor capacity was taken over by Rolls-Royce to produce Merlin engines.

Previously, Keynsham Cadbury was the home of Fry's Chocolate Cream, the Double Decker, Dairy Milk, Chocolate Buttons, Creme Eggs and Mini Eggs, Cadbury's Fudge, Chomp, Crunchie and Curly Wurly. According to Cadbury employees (or 'chocolate welders' as they are locally known), the Crunchie machine made over one million bars a day.

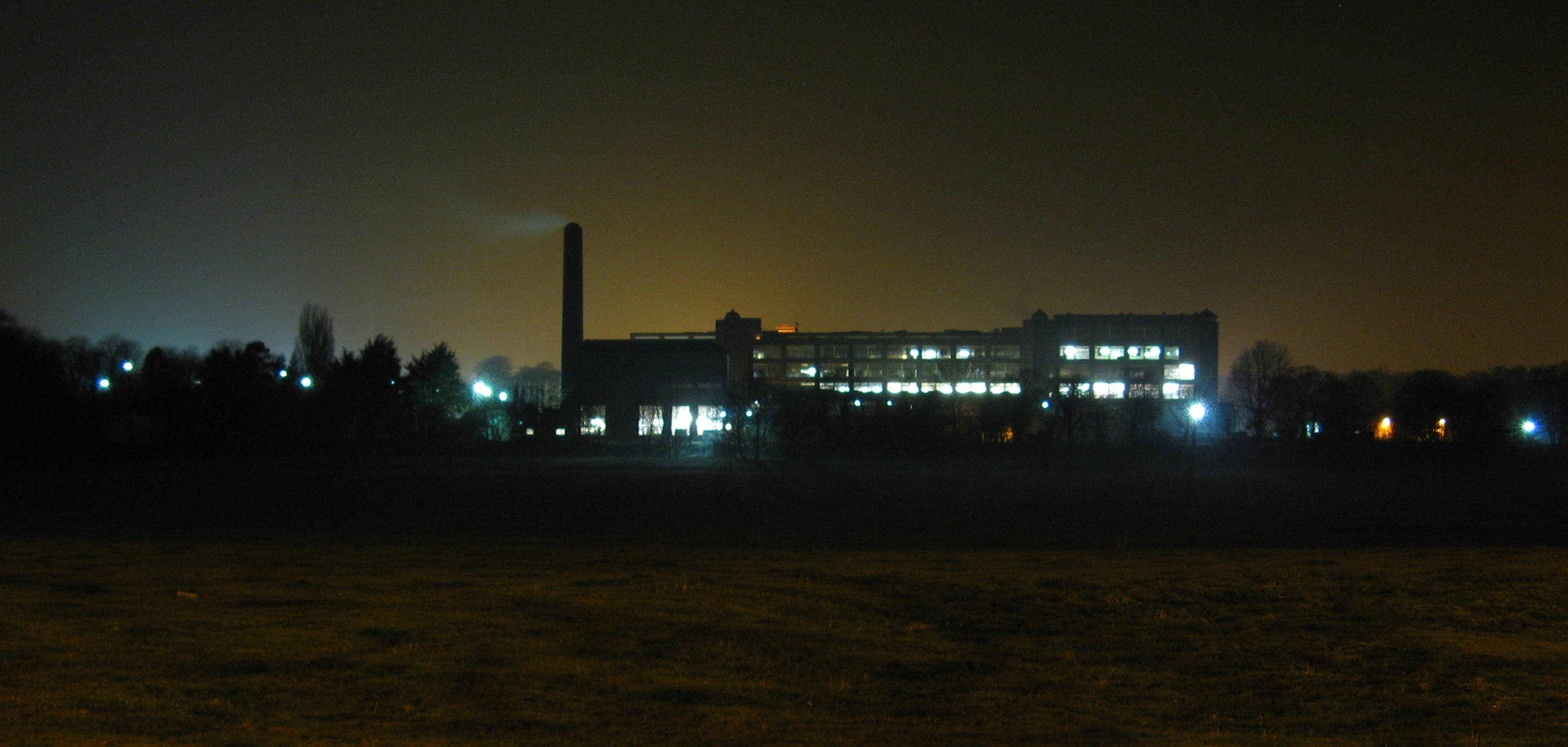
Factory at night, during last month of operation

On 3 October 2007, Cadbury announced plans to close the Somerdale plant by 2010 with the loss of some 500 jobs. Another motivational factor was the high real estate value of the land. Labour MP for Wansdyke, Dan Norris said "news of the factory's closure is a hard and heavy blow, not just to the workforce, but to the Keynsham community as a whole".

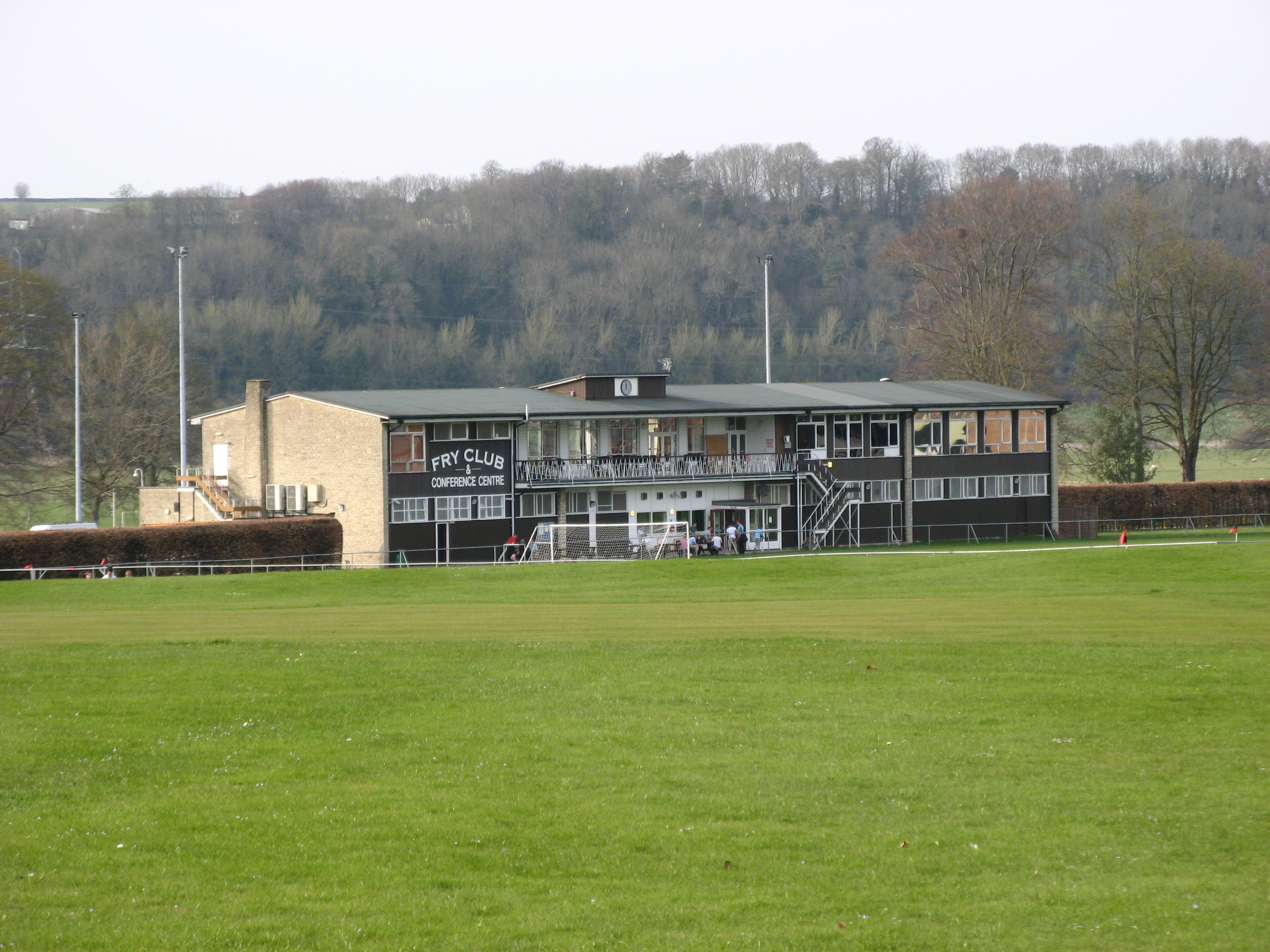
Fry Club, which will be rebuilt in another location

In late 2007 campaigns to save the Cadbury's factory in Somerdale were in full swing. One local resident started a campaign to urge English Heritage to protect the site, and preserve the history of the factory. This campaign hoped to stop the land being sold for housing, and the Somerdale factory being destroyed.

In February 2010, following the takeover of Cadbury plc by Kraft Foods, during which Kraft had said they would keep the factory open, the closure was confirmed to take place in 2011. Production was moved to a sister factory in Skarbimierz, Poland. This about face by the new owners earned them a rebuke by the Takeover Panel over the closure.

Production of Cadbury products was however promised to not move entirely out of the United Kingdom. The factory closed on 31 March 2011, after which machinery was shipped to Poland.

== Roman villa ==
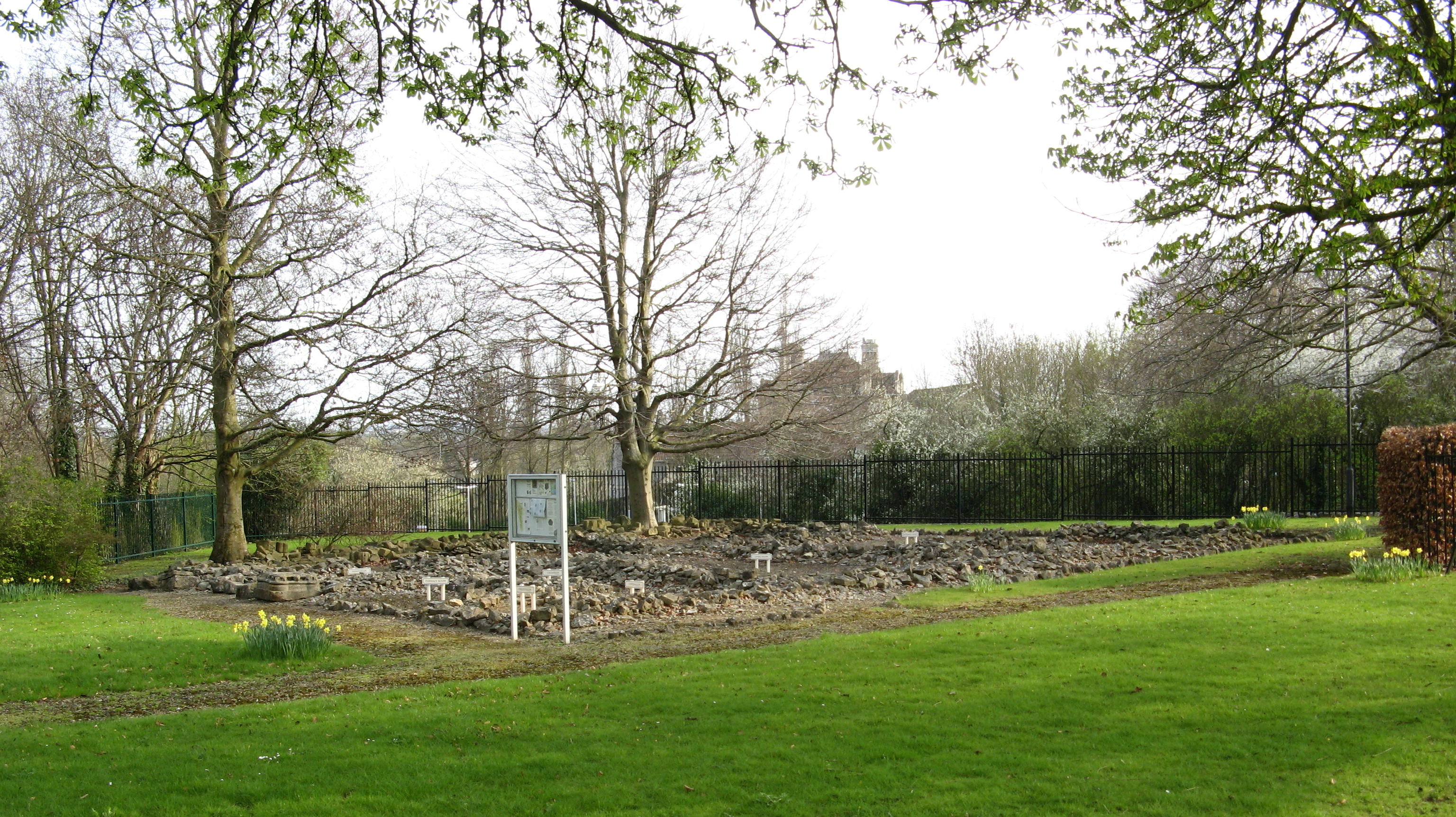
Somerdale Roman villa in 2010

The remains of a small Roman villa, about 50 feet square, are in the grounds of Somerdale Factory, near the main road entrance to the site. The remains were discovered during the construction of the factory in 1922, and moved to the present site. The discovery included two stone coffins.

== Regeneration ==
In early January 2012 the sale was agreed of the 220 acres (89 ha) site to the developer Taylor Wimpey, who wished to build 700 homes, a care home, some shops, a restaurant and a 210-place nursery and primary school. The plans retain the existing sports facilities and rebuild the Fry Club.

The plans included the demolition of 'block d' of the factory, to provide space for a rebuilt Fry Club, and in August 2014 some of factory had been demolished. In September 2014 show homes were opened, and sales of houses began.

The former factory buildings are operated as a retirement village by the St Monica Trust, branded as "The Chocolate Quarter". A new "Block D" has been built to provide 44 independent living apartments.

In the hope of continuing the tradition of The Fry Club as the social hub for the area, a new building was opened in November 2015 to provide leisure, health and entertainment services as well as facilities for weddings and private parties. The new Somerdale Pavilion was initially managed by Aquaterra Leisure, and from 2019 by the Somerdale Pavilion Trust.

The word SOMERDALE was spelt out in ballast stone along the South side of the GWR railway embankment, but has become less visible in recent years.
