= The Souldiers Pocket Bible =

Pamphlet version of the Christian Bible

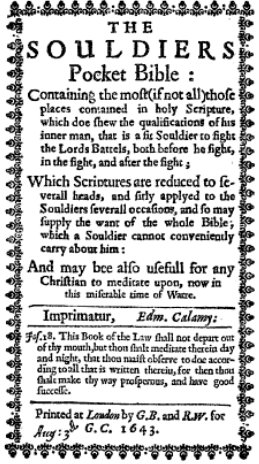
- Title page of The Souldiers Pocket Bible, 1643
- Language: English
- Publication date: 1643
- Publication place: Kingdom of England
- Media type: Pamphlet

The Souldiers Pocket Bible (aka Cromwell's Soldiers' Pocket Bible, The Soldier's Pocket Bible, Cromwell's Soldier's Bible) was a pamphlet version of the Bible that was carried by the soldiers of Oliver Cromwell's New Model Army during the English Civil War.

The Pocket Bible was first issued in 1643. A copy of it was discovered by an American book collector in 1854, in the form of an octavo booklet (5½ × 3″, 136 × 78mm). The pamphlet was only 16-pages-long, containing about 150 verse quotations from the Geneva Bible, all of them related to war topics. A number of the quotations intended to inspire the morale of the soldiers derived from the Book of Deuteronomy and the Book of Exodus, promising that God fights for his people against their enemies.

There are only two surviving copies of the original 1643 edition of the pamphlet. A 1693 version, with alterations reflecting the King James Version, has only one surviving copy. Several copies of the text survive in American reprints dating to the American Civil War of the 1860s, because the American Tract Society had decided to produce thousands of copies for use by the soldiers of the Union Army. About 50,000 copies of the Pocket Bible were printed for the Union soldiers.

== Description ==
The Souldiers Pocket Bible (lacking a possessive apostrophe in the title) was first issued in 1643 to Cromwell's army and was put in general use among his soldiers. It has been of historical record that Cromwell's soldiers were provided with a small pocket Bible. George Livermore, an American book collector from Cambridgeport, Massachusetts, discovered a copy of The Souldiers Pocket Bible in 1854; he realized that the Bible which Cromwell's soldiers were known to carry was not the complete Protestant Bible of 66 books, but a condensed pamphlet version. It was an octavo booklet (5½ × 3″, 136 × 78mm). In comparison, it was about the size and thickness of an international travel passport used in the 20th century.

The Souldiers Pocket Bible had just 16 pages that contained some 150 verse quotations from the Geneva Bible, all related to war. All but four of the verses were from the Old Testament. Verses intended to inspire the morale of Cromwell's soldiers included the following from the Geneva Bible:

- Deuteronomy 20:4 – For the Lord your God goeth with you, to fight for you against your enemies, and to save you.
- Exodus 14:14 – The Lord shall fight for you.

The 150 war-related verses were organized in sixteen sections. Cromwell helped select some of the verses used and supervised the editing of The Souldiers Pocket Bible by Edmund Calamy.

Section headers for the verses included the following:

A Souldier must not doe wickedly
A Souldier must be valiant for God[']s cause
A Souldier must love his enemies as they are his enemies, and hate them as they are god[']s enemies
A Souldier must consider that sometimes God[']s people have the worst in battel as well as God[']s enemies.

This condensed Souldiers Pocket Bible was usually buttoned on the inside waistcoat, placed near the heart, and under the soldier's outer coat. The placement did not hinder the movements of the soldier. English Puritan church leader Richard Baxter relates a story that the life of one of Cromwell's soldiers was saved by his carrying a copy of The Souldiers Pocket Bible near his heart; a bullet fired at him became lodged in the pamphlet instead of his heart.

== Purpose ==
Cromwell's military success was largely due to the training of his soldiers. However The Souldiers Pocket Bible was used for religious inspiration and to help influence good morals and rigid discipline. Before Cromwell's soldiers went into battle, they would pray and sing religious songs from the Book of Psalms. According to Cromwell, his soldiers never lost a battle after The Souldiers Pocket Bible was issued to them in 1643.

== Legacy ==
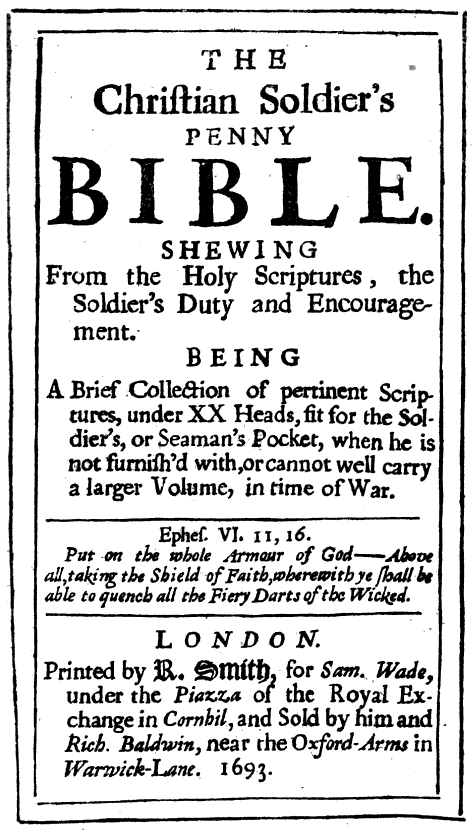
The Christian Soldier's Penny Bible (1693); a version of The Souldiers Pocket Bible (1643)

Two copies exist of the 1643 edition of The Souldiers Pocket Bible. The London copy was presented by George III to the British Museum. The only other 1643 copy known is found in the United States and was once owned by the prominent 19th-century book collector George Livermore. The work was reissued in 1693 under the title The Christian Soldier's Penny Bible. The British Museum has the only 1693 copy known to exist. This version is similar to The Souldiers Pocket Bible except for changes to some of the "Headers" and minor alterations in the text. The latter reflect the King James Version of the Bible rather than the Geneva Bible text used for the 1643 edition.

In 1861 Riverside Press reprinted one hundred copies of the 1643 text in facsimile for Livermore. At the time of the American Civil War, the American Tract Society printed The Soldier's Pocket Bible in large numbers to serve as a religious manual for the Northern troops. About fifty thousand copies of The Soldier's Pocket Bible were reprinted for the troops at that time.

The Souldiers Pocket Bible was the first of the shortened, concise Bible versions that became popular for distribution to troops by military authorities and for use by individuals for personal guidance and inspiration.
