= George Livermore =

American antiquarian and collector (1809–1865)

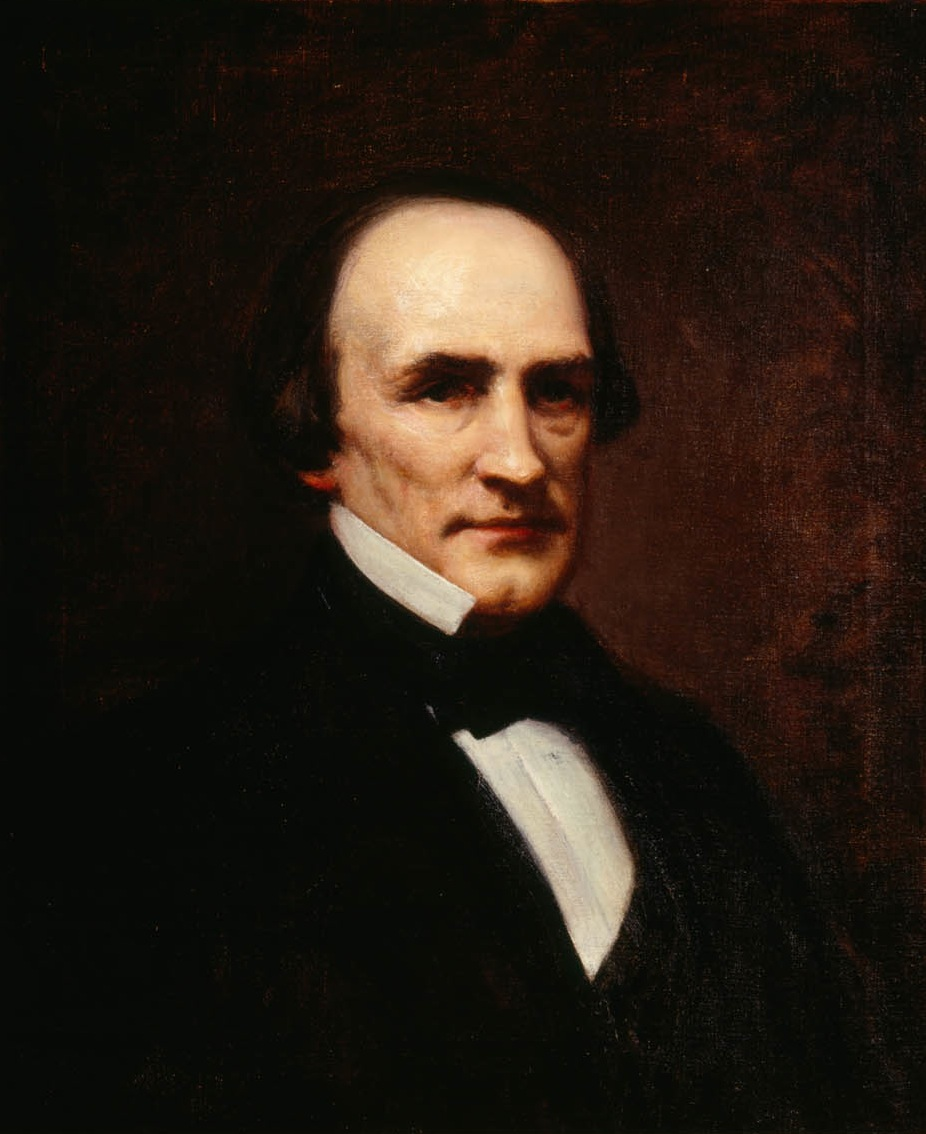
- Born: George Livermore; July 10, 1809; Cambridgeport, Cambridge, Massachusetts, US
- Died: August 30, 1865 (aged 56)
- Resting place: Massachusetts, US
- Known for: collecting books
- Spouse: Elizabeth Cunningham
- Children: 3 sons
- Parents: Deacon Nathaniel Livermore; Elizabeth Gleason

George Livermore (July 10, 1809 – August 30, 1865) was an American antiquarian, bibliographer, and historian, known chiefly as a book collector. He developed in his lifetime what was recognized as one of the finest private libraries in the United States and his library included many rare and one-of-a-kind bibles like some printed by Johannes Gutenberg. Livermore owned twenty-six volumes (almost a complete set) of the Massachusetts Historical Society's Collections. He wrote newspaper articles from time to time. Harvard College awarded Livermore an honorary Master of Arts, although he dropped out of school at the age of fourteen.

== Early life ==
Livermore was born July 10, 1809, at Cambridgeport, Cambridge, Massachusetts. His parents were Deacon Nathaniel Livermore and Elizabeth (Gleason) Livermore. His English ancestor, John Livermore, who emigrated from Ipswich, England, to the United States in 1634, settled in Watertown, Massachusetts, and was believed to be the progenitor for the Livermore family members in the United States.

Livermore attended both public and private elementary schools at Cambridgeport. He pursued college-prep courses in addition to the normal elementary school courses. One of his private school classmates was the poet Oliver Wendell Holmes Sr. Others at his school included Richard H. Dana and Margaret Fuller. He began to purchase books from Boston sales in his spare time.

== Mid-life and career ==
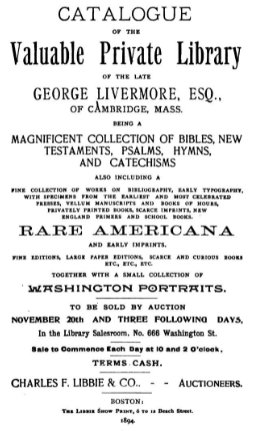
Livermore private library collection, 1894

For reasons of health, in 1823, at the age of fourteen, Livermore decided to go directly into the workplace rather than attending college. He left school and went to work with his older brothers, Isaac and Marshall. They were merchants at Cambridgeport, where they ran a store. The only additional schooling Livermore had was in 1827–28, when he was 18 years old. He took some courses in English and Latin at Deerfield Academy.

In 1829 Livermore went to Waltham, Massachusetts, some 8 miles (13 km) miles away, and became a dry-goods clerk and salesman in a store for a year. He returned to Cambridge in 1830 and went to work in his father's shop making fancy soaps. In the latter part of 1830, the owner of the dry-goods store asked Livermore to return, offering higher pay. Livermore accepted the offer and returned to Waltham. In the spring of 1831, the owner of the dry-goods store offered Livermore a two-year lease to operate the business on his own. With encouragement from his friends, he took the opportunity to operate this business and started officially in April 1831. Livermore ran the business with profit for the two years and returned the business to the original owner as per the lease agreement.

Since he had never left the state of Massachusetts, he decided to do some traveling in 1833. Livermore went first to Maine, then New York, Philadelphia, Baltimore, and Washington, D.C. While returning to Massachusetts, he went to West Point and Saratoga, New York. On his travels to Washington D.C., he visited the US president and spent a day at Mount Vernon, the estate of George Washington. Livermore was employed in the shoe and leather business in Boston in 1834. He traveled extensively for work. In the winter of 1834–35, he traveled to New Orleans for several weeks. In 1838 he went into partnership with his older brother Isaac as wool merchants. This afforded him the means to collect more books, as his diary showed.

He enjoyed books throughout his life and collected them from an early age. He obtained books on history, antiquities, biblical studies, and the history of printing and book binding. By 1841 he owned twenty-six volumes (almost a complete set) of the Massachusetts Historical Society's Collections and John Winthrop's "History of New England". He had developed, what was recognized at the time, as one of the finest private libraries in the United States. By 1850 he had some 3,000 books which he significantly increased over the next 15 years of his lifetime.

Livermore wrote articles for newspapers; for instance, in 1849 he wrote a series in the "Cambridge Chronicle"' on the New England Primer that were gathered together and published for private distribution in 1850. In 1849, he wrote an article for the Christian Examiner on Strickland's History of the American Bible Society. In 1850, he wrote an article in the North American Review on public libraries. In 1855 he created at his expense for private distribution a work titled A Tribute to the Memory of James Johnson, a Merchant of the Old School. In 1851, Livermore wrote an article for the Cambridge Chronicle entitled John Wycliffe and the first English Bible which historian Charles Deane praised as an outstanding work of research.

In August 1862 Livermore wrote a historical research pamphlet on the opinions of the Founding Fathers of the United States of Negroes as slaves and as free citizens. Charles Sumner, the Republican senator from Massachusetts, presented Abraham Lincoln with a copy of Livermore's pamphlet in November 1862. The research work is thought by some historians to have influenced Lincoln's decision made between the issuance of the preliminary Emancipation Proclamation on September 22, 1862, and the finalized law decree of the proclamation on January 1, 1863, to include endorsing the use of former slaves as soldiers in the Union Army. Livermore's research goes into detail as to attitudes of the country's Founding Fathers as to slavery showing that George Washington, Thomas Jefferson, Benjamin Franklin and the colonial principal leaders opposing the concept.

== Church ==
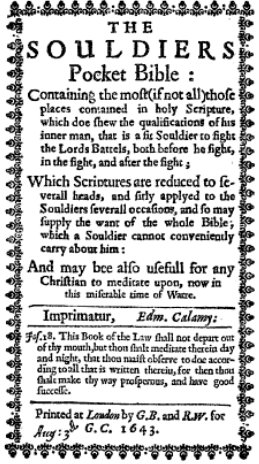
Title page Soldiers Pocket Bible, 1643

Livermore's diary shows he participated in church activities throughout his life, including being a Sunday school teacher from time to time and writing hymns for Sunday school children. He bought various Bibles for his library book collection. About a quarter of his personal library consisted of Bibles or related Bible literature. One of these was a rare copy of Cromwell's Soldiers' Pocket Bible (1643). This Pocket Bible was a condensed version of the Geneva Bible, containing chiefly war-related verses to inspire the troops, as well as provide moral guidance. Given the printing methods of the time, a complete Bible would have been too bulky for a soldier to carry. Livermore's copy of the 1643 Pocket Bible is one of two copies that have survived into the 21st century. The 16-page pamphlet was the first of many condensed versions of the Bible, a form that would become popular for use by military authorities and by individuals. There were only two copies of the bible in existence when Livermore's copy was sold out of his library for $1,000 in 1894 (equivalent to $37,212 in 2025).

In 1838, Livermore obtained a copy of the Coverdale's Bible. Another example of a rare Bible he purchased was a 1478 Venice edition of the Latin Vulgate, once owned by Pope Pius VI (with his coat of arms on the cover). Livermore purchased a copy of the Geneva Bible from Rev. Dr. Homer's personal library in Newton, Massachusetts, which had been presented by Admiral Sir Isaac Coffin to Dr. Homer. This is purportedly the same 1576 copy (with a ghostly outline of the royal arms) given to Elizabeth I by the printer.

Livermore's library included a bible that had been owned by Adam Winthrop (father of the first Governor of Massachusetts); this copy is now held by the Massachusetts Historical Society. By 1861 some of the oldest printed bibles in the United States were owned by Livermore, including a copy of the Catholicon printed by Gutenberg in 1460, and a Faust and Schoffer's Testament of 1462. A single leaf on vellum of the 1455 Gutenberg Bible that Livermore owned was sold out of his library in 1894 for $95 (equivalent to $3,535 in 2025).

== Family ==
Livermore married Elizabeth Cunningham when he was thirty years old, on October 1, 1839, in Cambridge, Massachusetts. Their children were Frank (b. April 11, 1841), William Roscoe (b. January 11, 1843), and Charles (b. April 11, 1848).

== Works ==
- Catalogue of the Valuable Private Library of the Late George Livermore
- Historical Research – self published (200 pages).
- Remarks on Public Libraries 1850 – Bolles and Houghton (1850) – for private distribution.
- Tribute to Memory of James Johnson (1855) Self–published for private distribution.
- An Historical Research Respecting the Opinions of the Founders of the Republic on Negroes as Slaves, as Citizens, and as Soldiers, Read Before the Massachusetts Historical Society, August 14, 1862
- Origin, history & character of New England primer – C.F. Heartman (1915)

== Death ==
Livermore died August 30, 1865, at age 56, in Cambridge, Massachusetts.

== Societies and legacy ==
Livermore was a member of the Massachusetts Historical Society beginning in 1849. He was also elected a member of the American Antiquarian Society in 1849, and served on its board of councilors from 1853 to 1865. He became a member of the American Academy of Arts and Sciences in 1855. Livermore was a trustee of the Boston Athenaeum from 1851 to 1859, chairing its Library Committee, and later served as its vice-president until his death. He became a trustee of the Massachusetts State Library in 1850. The American Unitarian Association elected Livermore a member of the executive committee in 1859.

Harvard College awarded Livermore an honorary Master of Arts in 1850 and at that time he was elected a member of Phi Beta Kappa society. He was also a member of the American Academy of Arts and Sciences. Anna Morton Waterston, reporter for the Atlantic Monthly, wrote a memorial article in November 1865 titled "The Visible and Invisible in Libraries" on the death of Livermore. She said that the library of Livermore spoke eloquently of him. His collection of books, gathered as a labor of love, increased in size over the years. Waterston described his life as a book written with good deeds and pure thoughts and illuminated by specially recognized aspirations.

== Bibliography ==
- Deane, Charles (1869). Memoir of George Livermore. Massachusetts Historical Society. OCLC 1062214860.
- Duyckinck, Evert Augustus (1875). Cyclopædia of American Literature: Embracing Personal and Critical Notices of Authors, and Selections from Their Writings, from the Earliest Period to the Present Day; with Portraits, Autographs, and Other Illustrations. In two volumes. W. Rutter.
- Hillard, George Stillman (1869). "Memoir of George Livermore" by Charles Deane.
- Old Northwest (1901). The "Old Northwest" Genealogical Quarterly. "Old Northwest" Genealogical Society.
- Proceedings of the Massachusetts Historical Society (1869). Proceedings. The Society. p. 458.
- Thwing, Walter Eliot (1902). The Livermore Family of America. W.B. Clarke Company.
