= Philip Luckombe =

English printer and author

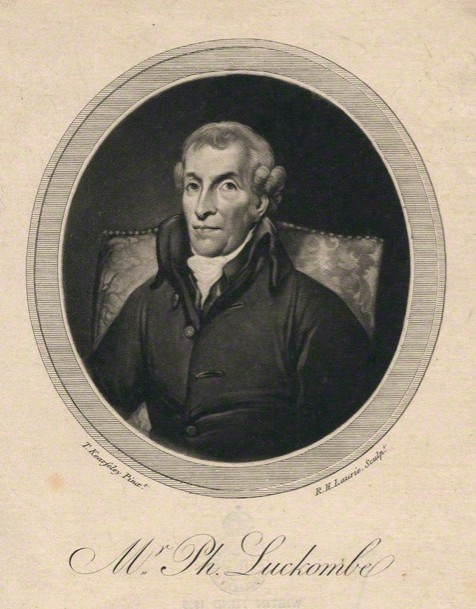
Philip Luckombe

Philip Luckombe (baptised 1730 – died 1803) was an English printer and author.

== Life ==
He was born at Exeter, the son of John Luckombe, a tailor. He worked as a printer there, and then moved to London, where he was employed as a writer.

The editor of dictionaries and encyclopædias, Luckombe also wrote books on printing, and made a study of conchology. His collection of shells was considerable, and his learning brought him the acquaintance of Thomas Percy.

Luckombe died in September 1803.

== Works ==
Luckombe's main works are:

- A Tour through Ireland in Several Entertaining Letters, 1748, with William Rufus Chetwood
- A Concise History of the Origin and Progress of Printing, 1770.
- The History and Art of Printing, 2 parts, 1771.
- A Tour through Ireland, 1780. This work depended on plagiarism, for instance from Richard Twiss. Other works it draws on were the early Tour with Chetwood, the Hibernia Curiosa (1769) of John Bush of Tunbridge Wells, and Thomas Campbell's Philosophical Survey (1777).
- The Traveller's Companion, or a New Itinerary of England and Wales, 1789.
- England's Gazetteer, 3 vols. 1790.
- The Tablet of Memory, 8th edit. 1792.

== Notes ==
Attribution

This article incorporates text from a publication now in the public domain: Lee, Sidney, ed. (1893). "Luckombe, Philip". Dictionary of National Biography. Vol. 34. London: Smith, Elder & Co.
