= Bristol Gazette =

The Bristol Gazette was a newspaper published in Bristol from 1767 until 23 May 1872. It was founded by William Pine. From 1 January 1795 the Gazette was jointly published with his son also called William Pine. Following William Pine, senior's death in 1803, his son continued publishing the paper. In 1807 he took on a partner, John Mills, the son of local printer/publisher Thomas Mills.
