= University College, Bristol =

Predecessor institution of the University of Bristol

Coordinates: 51.4544°N 2.6028°W

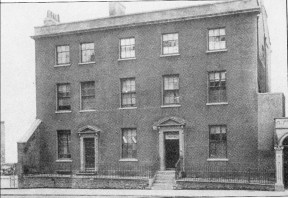
- University College, Bristol in the city centre. This photograph was taken in 1874
- Established: October 10, 1876
- Religious affiliation: Quaker and Nonconformist
- Location: 11 Park Street, Bristol, United Kingdom of Great Britain and Ireland

University College, Bristol was a college from 1876 to 1909. It was the predecessor institution to the University of Bristol, which gained a royal charter in 1909. From its foundation, the college, which espoused Quaker, Liberal, and Non-Conformist values, was open to men and women alike.

== Origins ==
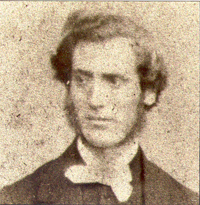
John Percival was an early figure in the development of the college who pressed the University of Oxford for support.

The history of University College, Bristol and ultimately the University of Bristol can be traced as far back as 1872 and the attempts of John Percival, a local educationalist and headmaster of Clifton College, to press for the creation of a college.

In February 1868, John and Louisa Percival formed a Committee in Bristol to promote the Higher Education of Women, which arranged lectures and other classes from 1870 to help prepare women to prepare for the Higher Education Cambridge Examination. By 1876 this programme had developed to the point that Percival felt able to propose the foundation of University College, Bristol. With the Percival's influence, this became 'the first town in England to possess a University College open alike to men and women.'

Percival's strong Christian religious views (he later became a bishop) influenced his views on education, in that he believed that opportunities should be available to both males and females irrespective of their declared faith. He is credited with the initial idea that there should be a university in Bristol. Lewis Fry, a later influence on the college and the subsequent university, is quoted as saying that it was to Percival that they owed the foundation of the college.

In 1872, Percival wrote a letter to the Oxford colleges noting the lack of a university culture in the provinces. He also canvassed support when Bristol Medical School was looking for a new building and in 1873 he suggested to the Medical School Council that they both approach the Bristol Museum and Library Society to attempt to establish a college. This allowed the creation of a committee to promote the scheme led by the dean of Bristol, which contained prominent Bristol politicians from the Liberal and Conservative Parties and members representing local industry. It was in July 1876 that the medical school agreed to affiliate with the college in return for the promise that it would be supplied with additional space to expand, a promise which was eventually honoured three years later. This building now houses the University of Bristol's Department of Geography.

In 1873, Percival wrote a pamphlet entitled The Connection of the Universities and the Great Towns which was met with a positive response from Benjamin Jowett, a connection of Percival, who at this time was the Master of Balliol College. His promise of sponsorship initially helped the project. It was Percival's connections with the colleges of Oxford which helped in lobbying for the creation of the university. Percival was able to agree that the Master of Balliol College would subscribe £300 to the project, on the terms that adult education was catered for and that the college catered for the arts as well as the sciences.

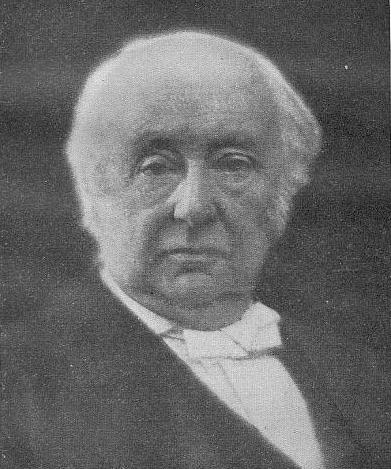
Benjamin Jowett was an early influence on the college. Later, he was to donate some of his own personal wealth to the college.

On 11 June 1874, the Victoria Rooms hosted a meeting to promote what was described as a College of Science and Literature for the West of England and South Wales. The meeting was attended by the then president of the British Association and Sir William Thomson (later Lord Kelvin). This meeting has been described as a partial success, as it gained the support of Albert Fry and Lewis Fry, members of the influential Fry family (the Fry name being known for the chocolate business set up by their grandfather and developed by their father Joseph Storrs Fry). Lewis Fry was a Quaker, lawyer and later a Liberal and Unionist Member of Parliament from 1885 to 1892 and 1895 to 1890 for the constituency Bristol North. Albert Fry also gained distinction as the founder of the Bristol Wagon & Carriage Works Co. However, the fact that the project attracted large numbers of Quakers, Non-Conformists and Liberals meant that the project was labelled as such an institution. Tories made some initial grants to the project but soon focused their interest on a rival institution through the Society of Merchant Venturers which was considered mostly Conservative in politics. Ironically, the Society of Merchant Venturers, which was to become a rival institution during much of the college's history, made a gift of £1000 at this point.

Despite this initial donation, a lack of funds was to plague University College, Bristol up until the donations which allowed it to lobby for a royal charter. Initially the financial response to the meeting was disappointing, with the college gaining only £25,991 of the £40,000 funds which it asked for. It was at this stage that the Wills family became involved in the project with Henry Overton Wills donating £250 to the project. The lacklustre response to the call for funds had the immediate result of delaying the opening of the college until 1876, and meant that when it did open it was under the most stringent financial conditions. Shelborne notes that the setting up of the college struggled due to the fact that Bristol lacked a significant industry which saw benefit in the creation a college, an absence of the nouveaux riches, and no philanthropic industrialists who wished to highlight the importance of Bristol.

== Opening of University College, Bristol ==
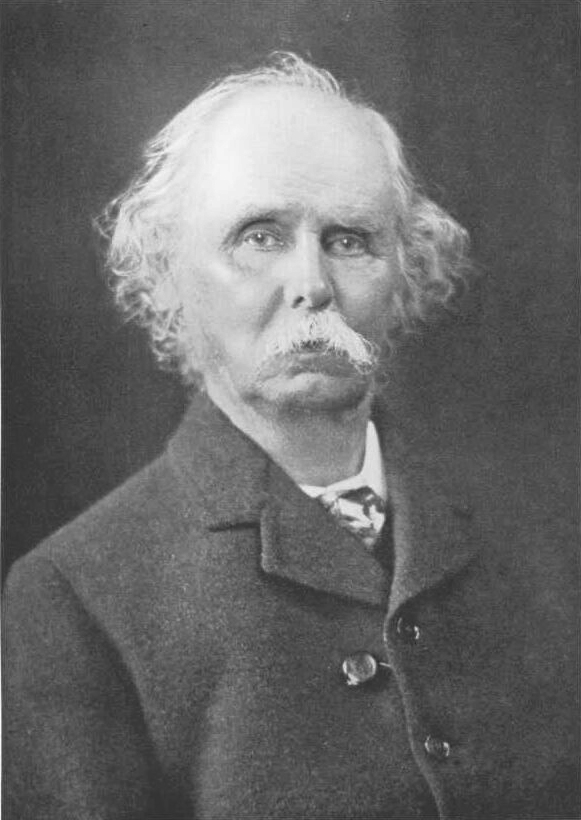
Alfred Marshall was the first principal of the college, he was later an economist and teacher to John Maynard Keynes.

University College, Bristol opened on Tuesday 10 October 1876 at 9.00 a.m. with a mathematics lecture by W. R. Bousfield, who also lectured in higher maths an hour later. The charges for such a course were three guineas for two lectures each week during the Christmas and Easter terms; a student also had to pay 7s as an entrance fee to enroll. At its opening in 1876, two professors and five lecturers offered lectures in fifteen subject areas. The college was situated at 32 Park Row and was rented for £50 per annum. As requested by Jowett when giving money, the college was open to men and women on the same basis (except in medicine), The college offered scholarships, the most valuable of which was one in chemistry worth £25. General scholarships of £15 were also available. Despite the label of 'University' however, the institution did not have the power to award degrees to its students. There were, however, links with the University of London which allowed the external sitting of these examinations and the Cambridge Local Higher Examinations useful for those who wished to become teachers.

During the first year 30 men and 69 women registered for classes, and there were 238 evening classes, which cost five shillings with a registration fee of one shilling. The buildings rented were used by the college as a deaf and dumb institute. In its early years the college was very poor. The college had raised £23,437, just short of the £25,000 that it was suggested was required at the Victoria Rooms meeting, but in reality this sum fell well short of what would be sufficient. Much of the college's initial money was spent on acquiring land such as that beside Rifle Drill Hall, next to where Bristol Grammar School now stands.

Several lecturers at the college achieved reputations in their own subject fields, including Henry Selby Hele-Shaw (Engineering), Silvanus Thompson (Physics), and William Johnson Sollas (Geography). The college lacked any kind of formal syllabus. Students' reasons for entering the college were varied, with some, such as G. H. Leonard (who later became a professor at the University of Bristol), using their time there as preparation for the Cambridge scholarship examination. One female student is said to have attended "in order to improve after dinner conversation". However, by the 1880s University College, Bristol could be said to be producing its first graduates.

Jowett's connections with Alfred Marshall allowed him to pick Marshall as the first principal of the college. Marshall is now considered one of the most dominant figures in world economics at the beginning of the 20th century. Marshall came to Bristol as a result of his marriage to one of his students Mary Paley at St. John's, which required his immediate resignation of his fellowship there in Moral Science. Marshall taught evening classes to young businessmen while his wife taught during the day to ladies. Her salary was deducted from his wages. Today Alfred Marshall has a building of the University of Bristol named after him in recognition of his early influence on the foundation of the university.

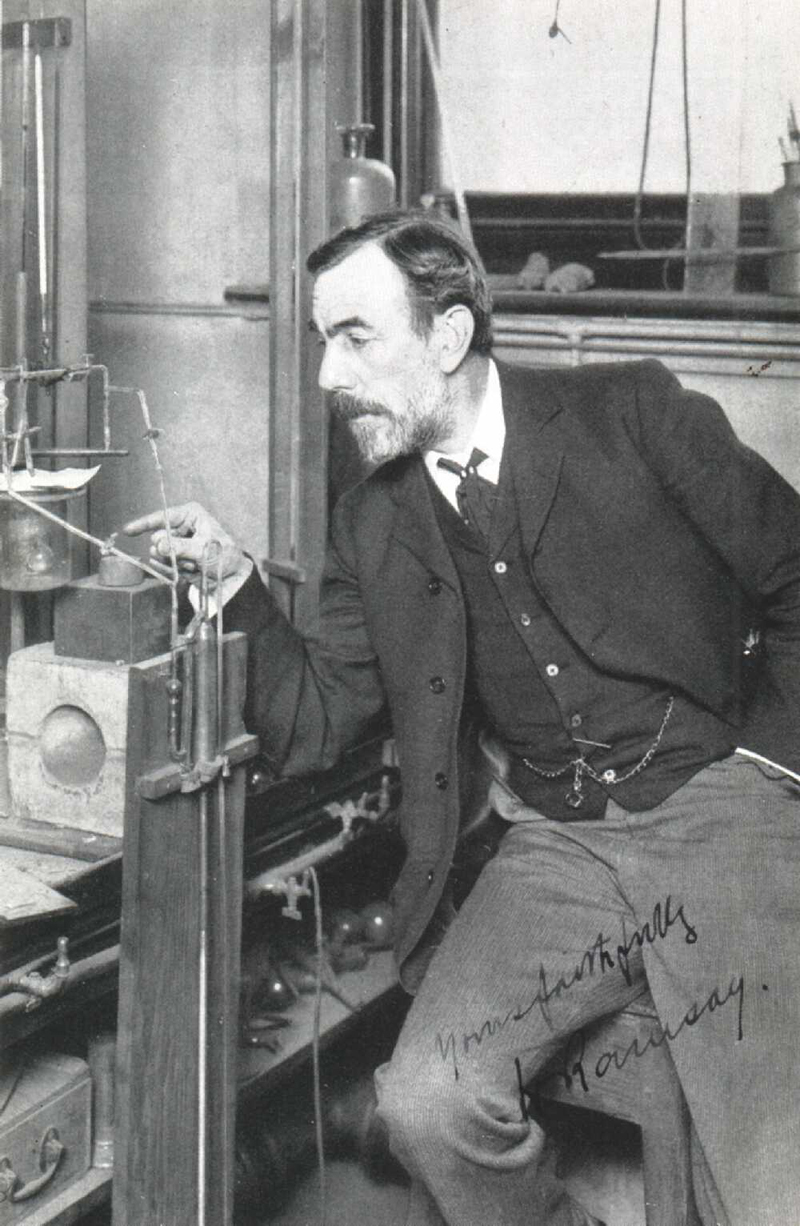
William Ramsay, seen here in later life, was the second principal of the college. Today he is known for his discovery of the noble gases.

Marshall stated his intention to leave in 1879 and was talked out of resigning, but he eventually did so in 1881 during a period of acute financial struggle for the college. Marshall's reasons for resignation were varied; he found the nature of the job left little time for the reflection needed to pursue his academic work, and he preferred academia to administration. The financial situation of the college played a part, and he found the need to "beg" to maintain the institution's finances distasteful. There was an obvious successor to the position of principal, with chemistry professor William Ramsay replacing Marshall in the post.

Ramsay is said to have brought great energy to the talk of improving the college. He embarked on a round of after-dinner parties to promote the college, and in 1883 he was able to build a purpose-built laboratory. In 1884 the college came close to bankruptcy when the treasurer announced that funds would dry up within two months. The college survived, but two professors were given notice of dismissal and their departments were placed on a self-supporting notice. At this time Welsh colleges were able to receive financial support but not English ones, so English colleges therefore decided to lobby the Government for funding. The result was that English colleges would receive a grant of £15000, of which Bristol gained the modest share of £1,200. Ramsay resigned his post in 1887 after being appointed chair of chemistry at University College London. Although no longer principal, after his resignation he used his influence to lobby the college council to appoint his assistant Morris Travers to the chair of chemistry when the position became vacant. Travers is credited with pushing forward the Charter campaign during the beginning of the 20th century.

When Conwy Lloyd Morgan was appointed he was only given the lesser title of Dean of University College, Bristol, and it was only in 1891 when finances had improved that he was given the title of principal. Morgan had come to Bristol in 1884 from a post in Cape Town, South Africa. Today he is considered to be one of the first experimental psychologists, but he came to Bristol to replace the geology teacher William Johnson Sollas. He is considered to have coined much of the terminology regarding contemporary animal science. At Bristol he became fully involved in the campaign to gain the college a royal charter.

The financial problems of the college were based upon the fact that there had been a failure to find a 'local Carnegie' – a business magnate who could finance the university by providing endowments and financing the payment of staff. The passing of the Technical Instruction Act empowered local authorities to level a rate for technical instruction. Bristol was able to apply for a further £2,000 in funds and a further £500 was gained in return for an agreement that free places would be made available to some students. This money was used to build an engineering block. A few months earlier the Medical School building had been finished and formally incorporated into the college. It was not until 1899 that the college began to receive any kind of state funding, leading one lecturer to joke that the motto of the college should be not Knowledge is power but College is poor; until this time the college was wholly dependent upon the student fees paid for the courses. However, the college was expanded as finances allowed during the 1890s after it had teetered on the edge of bankruptcy several times the decade before.

By 1897, some anxiety was caused by the opening of a Bristol Technical College which began to draw some of the students who would have attended University College, Bristol. However, it is argued that this threat was more imaginary than real as the University College was able to cater for more academic interests.

== Campaign for a royal charter ==
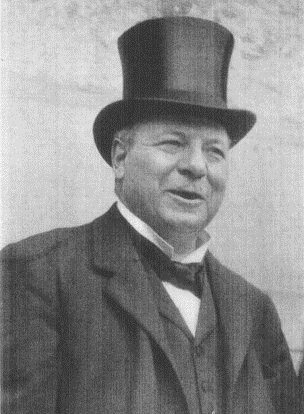
Lord Haldane was a key figure in the move to create a university. He later served as a chancellor of the University of Bristol.

At the turn of the century the chances of the college gaining a royal charter seemed a distant prospect. Many on the College Council were aware of the need to progress and achieve greater financial support including Lewis Fry. They were aware that was it not for the anonymous donations made to the college (by a Mr Fenwick Richards) during the last century there would have been bankruptcy. The establishment of the University Colston Society (named after one of Bristol's great benefactors Edward Colston) was the impetus for the campaign to create a university for Bristol and the West of England. It was non-political and was aimed at shaking off the image that the college was a Liberal institution as it was recognised broad political support needed to be generated in order for the plan to become a university to succeed. The first Society Dinner was held on 7 December 1899 with the guest speaker James Bryce (later Viscount Bryce).

In 1900, a committee was set under the chairmanship of the Bishop of Bristol. However, the committee only ever had one meeting after the first resulted in the announcement that a report into the viability of a university for Bristol would require a Registrar at a cost of £1000 per annum. There was some debate as to whether an autonomous university should be formed for Bristol and the West of England or whether a federal organisation should be created which included University College, Bristol as well as Merchant Venturers' Technical College as possibly the colleges of Reading, Exeter and Southampton. Lord Haldane had proposed the idea of a federal university as a compromise but it failed to increase support.

Morris Travers who gained the post of lecture in chemistry at the college is generally credited with pushing forward the campaign to gain a charter by courting the local press and pressing for the support of the Fry brothers who held power on the City power continuously from 1882 and 1909. There is evidence that Marshall had told Travers to reject the compromise idea of a federal university and push for a Bristol university. Travers spoke to Lewis Fry head of the College Council on 1 February 1905 and was able to make Fry write to relatives to increase support. Lewis Fry was able to get the Conservative chairman of the City Education Committee to agree to the idea of setting up a university. Travers wrote pamphlets advocating the university and editorials were written for the Bristol Times supporting the university.

By 1905, it could be stated that the national government were supportive of the idea of setting up a university in Bristol. Here, two piece of fortune occurred. The Blind Asylum on Queen's Road at the top of Park Street, where the Wills Memorial Building now stands, came up for sale. Travers picked up a telephone line which was shared with the Asylum and was able to eavesdrop and hear the conversation which stated that the trustees were preparing to sell. Although with a price of £40,000 for the land it seemed unlikely the college could afford to purchase the plot, on 11 January 1906, William Travers was told by Lewis Fry that he had been promised the money to purchase the plot by several members of the Fry family and Wills Family: his brother Joseph Storrs Fry (£10,000), cousin Francis Fry (£5,000), Sir William Henry Wills (£10,000) and Sir Fredrick Wills (£5,000). It was the Wills and Fry families who were the chief benefactors of what became the University of Bristol. Joseph Storrs Fry was a successful businessman but the wealth of the Fry family was small in relation to that of the Wills. Frederick Wills had sat on University College councils and between 1900 and 1906 was the sitting MP for Bristol North, the seat that was previously occupied by Lewis Fry. William Henry Wills was first chairman of Imperial Tobacco and his families personal estate was estimated to make the Wills family one of the richest families in the land.

The second fortunate event occurred in January 1906 when the Merchant Venturers' Technical College was destroyed by fire. The Merchant Venturers saw University College, Bristol as dominated by Liberals and therefore supported the Bristol Trade School instead. The fire made the organisation worried about its future and removed any objection which they would have to the creation of a university.

Henry Wills made a donation of £100,000 to the creation of the University of Bristol.

In 1906, a committee to promote the creation of the university was established. Lewis Fry was able to announce that £30,000 as an endowment fund was to be given by Lord Winterstoke (a member of the Wills Family). The Merchant Venturers had negotiations to join with the college but were unable to a complete amalgamation wanted to retain some autonomy. There was another setback when Travers left the project to work on the setting up of an Indian Research Institution in Bangalore. Travers can be credited with significantly moving forward the project but the issue of finances remained still remained.

On 14 January 1908 at the annual College Colston society dinner, George Alfred Wills rose to his feet and dramatically announced the news that his father, Henry Overton, was to donate £100,000 to the cause promoting the creation of the university providing that a royal charter was obtained within two years. Records note that the room began to cheer after the announcement was made. This announcement caused further funds to be promised by those attending the university. The day ended with the university endowment fund standing at five times greater than it had at the start with the university scheme attracting more in 24-hours than it did in its entire history. The raising of such large firms meant that the Privy Council could not argue that the creation of what were then disparagingly known as 'Lilliputian' Universities would in any way result in a decrease in the standard of British universities. H.O. Wills had little contact with the college apart from the fact that he had sent his son Harry to classes there. He died in 1911 after becoming the first chancellor of the University of Bristol. The Wills Memorial Building was built by his two surviving sons in memory at a cost of £500,000. The impact of the Wills family upon the university can also be founding in the naming of the H.H. Wills Physics Laboratory built by George in memory of his brother which cost some £200,000 and the building of Wills Hall, a hall of residence for the university in Stoke Bishop. Unlike many of the supporters of the university the Wills were not Liberals or Quakers but Congregationalists.

Later an agreement with the Merchant Venturers was made with the organisation being merged with the college's engineering department to create a new faculty of engineering. All teaching was to take place in the Merchant Venturers Building. The principal Julius Wertheimer was left with little bargaining power after the destruction of his own institutions buildings. As government funding was linked to endowment this massive endowment created further wealth for the college. Later in 1908 a petition was presented to the Privy Council representing the views of the University Committee. On 24 May 1909 Bristol University, as it then became known, gained its royal charter allowing it to award degrees after the king in Privy Council assented to the creation of a university. Flags were flown from public buildings in Bristol and the city's church bells hang out on receiving the news.

== Hodgson affair ==
In 1916, the head of the head of the women's secondary teacher training department, Geraldine Hodgson was dismissed for reasons that were not made clear. Hodgson had served since 1902 and she was a published author and a graduate. Jealousy of her achievements, her support for the suffrage movement and a dispute with the vice-chancellor, Isambard Owen, are possible factors. Hodgson ended her career at Ripon and Wakefield and Bradford Diocesan Training College.

== List of principals ==
University College, Bristol, existed from 1877 to 1909, after which it became the University of Bristol.

- Alfred Marshall (1877–1881) – Marshall was also a lecturer on political economy. His wife Mary Paley Marshall also taught at the college giving day classes to young ladies.
- Sir William Ramsay (1881–1887) – chemist
- Conwy Lloyd Morgan (1887–1909) – ethologist

== See also ==
- British universities
- 'Red Brick' universities
