= Morris Travers =

English chemist (1872–1961)

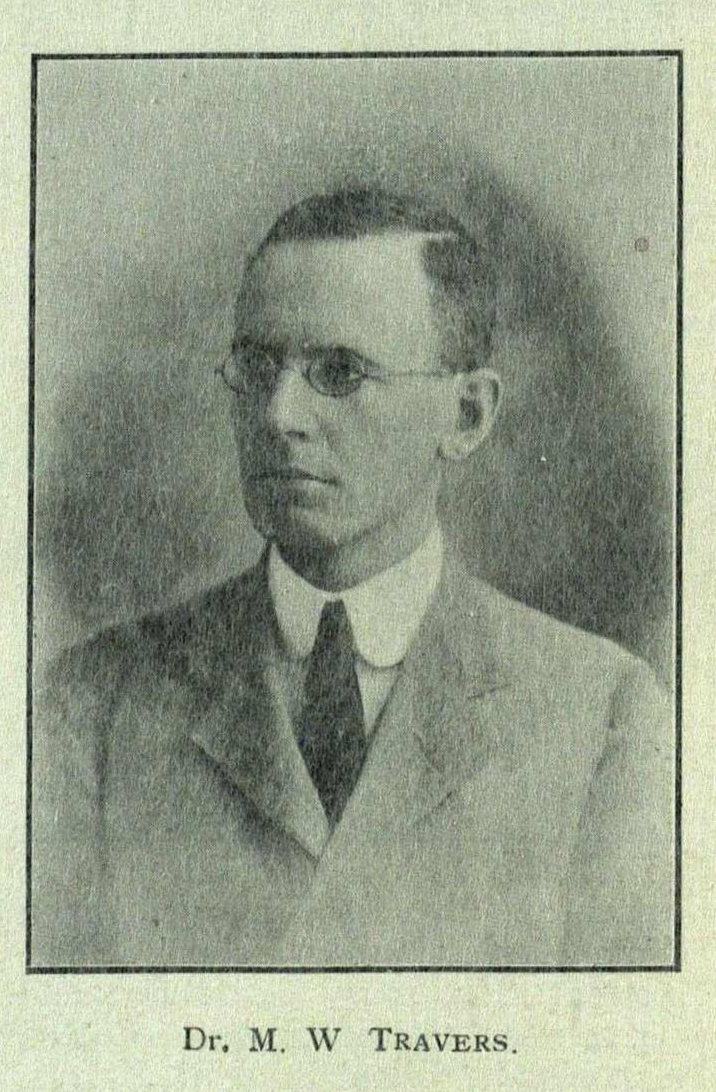
- c. 1909
- Born: Morris William Travers; 24 January 1872; Kensington, London, England
- Died: 25 August 1961 (aged 89); Stroud, England
- Awards: Fellow of the Royal Society
- Scientific career
- Fields: Chemistry
- Workplaces: Indian Institute of Science

Morris William Travers, FRS (24 January 1872 – 25 August 1961) was an English chemist who worked with Sir William Ramsay in the discovery of xenon, neon and krypton. His work on several of the rare gases earned him the name Rare Gas Travers in scientific circles. He was the founding director of the Indian Institute of Science, prior to which he served as a professor of Chemistry at the University College, Bristol, predecessor institution of the University of Bristol, on the recommendations of Sir William Ramsay, former principal of the University College.

== Early life ==
Travers was born in Kensington, London, the son of William Travers MD, FRCS (1838–1906), an early pioneer of aseptic surgical techniques. His mother was Anne Pocock. Travers went to school at Ramsgate, Woking and Blundell's School.

== Career ==
He then went to University College, where he began to work with Sir William Ramsay. Travers helped Ramsay to determine the properties of the newly discovered gases argon and helium. They also heated minerals and meteorites in the search for further gases, but found none. Then in 1898 they obtained a large quantity of liquid air and subjected it to fractional distillation. Spectral analysis of the least volatile fraction revealed the presence of krypton. They examined the argon fraction for a constituent of lower boiling point, and discovered neon. Finally xenon, occurring as an even less volatile companion to krypton, was identified spectroscopically. He knew the entire research story and wrote the biography of Sir William Ramsay in 1956 "A life of Sir William Ramsay, K.C.B., F.R.S."

In 1904 he became a professor at University College. In May 1904 he was selected a Fellow of the Royal Society.

In 1901–1902 Ramsay had been asked to advise the Indian government on the founding of a science institute and the institute was established in Bangalore with the help of the Government of Mysore and J. N. Tata. Ramsay suggested Travers as a possible director for this institute and in 1906, Travers was appointed as the director of the new Indian Institute of Science. The aim was to build the institute along the lines of the Imperial College of Science and Technology but Travers had conflicts with the Tata family especially in the interpretation of clauses in J. N. Tata's will. The institute was started in June 1911 with four departments: General, Organic, and Applied Chemistry and Electrical Engineering.

He returned to Britain at the outbreak of World War I and directed the manufacture of glass at Duroglass Limited. In 1920 he started a company with F. W. Clark called Travers and Clark Ltd. which was involved with high-temperature furnaces and fuel technology, including the gasification of coal. In 1927 he went back to Bristol as Honorary Professor in Applied Chemistry.

Travers continued his researches in cryogenics and made the first accurate temperature measurements of liquid gases. He also helped to build several experimental liquid air plants in Europe. He died in Stroud, Gloucestershire.

== Publications ==
The following is a partial list of publications:

- 1893. The preparation of acetylene from calcium carbide. Proc. Chem. Soc. p. 15.
- 1894. Metallic derivatives of acetylene. I. Mercuric acetylide. Trans. Chem. Soc. p. 264.
- 1895. (With W. Ramsay and J. Norman Collie) Helium, a constituent of certain minerals. Trans. Chem. Soc. p. 684.
- 1896–1897. Some experiments on helium. Proc. Roy. Soc. 60,449.
- 1898. The origin of the gases evolved on heating mineral substances, meteorites, etc. Proc. Roy. Soc. 64, 130.
- 1898. (With W. Ramsay) n a new constituent of atmospheric air [Krypton]. Proc. Roy. Soc. 63,405.
- 1901. The liquefaction of hydrogen. Phil. Mag. (6), 1,41 1.
- 1915. (With N. M. Gupta and R. C. Ray.) Some compounds of boron, hydrogen and oxygen. London: H. K. Lewis
- 1918. On the firing of glass pots. Trans. Soc. Glass Tech. 2, 170.
- 1928. The complete gasification of coal for towns' gas. Trans. Soc. Chem. Ind. p. 203.
- 1934. On a new view of the covalent bond, and the formation of free radicals. Trans. Faraday Soc. 30, 100.
- 1956. The life of Sir William Ramsay. London: Arnold.
