= Town Holdings Committee =

British Parliamentary committee

The Select Committee of Parliament on Town Holdings ran for nearly six years, finally reporting in 1892. Its chair was Lewis Fry, a solicitor and town councillor from Bristol.

The rapid expansion of the population of industrial cities and towns in the early years of the nineteenth century led to the growth of vast urban slums. The realization that overcrowded living conditions were a danger to public health resulted in several parliamentary investigations on town planning.

Several Select committees examined proposals for redeveloping parts of London. The Town Holdings Committee investigated the land tenure systems in force in towns throughout Great Britain and Ireland, landlord-tenant relations and municipal finance.

The committee was appointed on 18 March 1886 with the membership of Mr. Mellor, Mr. Wodehouse, Lord William Compton, Viscount Wolmer, Mr. Asher, Mr. Lewis Fry, Mr. Edward Russell, Mr. Conybeare, Mr. Goschen, Sir Henry James, Mr. Lawson, Mr. Saunders, Mr. Arthur Balfour, Mr. Gibson, Mr. Macartney, Mr. Tyssen Amherst, Viscount Folkestone, Mr. Sidney Herbert, Mr. Gregory, Sir John Ellis, Mr. Bartley, Mr. Crilly, Mr. O'Dogherty, and Colonel Nolan

The 1897 report included a census of housing which includes details of leases and building operations in progress as well as of the number, quality and types of houses in two hundred and fifty large towns in England and Wales.

== Reports of the Select Committee ==
Irish Universities Press: Parliamentary papers on Planning series:

- Volume 4: Report from the Select Committee on Town Holdings with minutes of evidence, appendix and index, 1886 ISBN 0-7165-0704-8
- Volume 5: Report from the Select Committee on Town Holdings together with the proceedings of the Committee, minutes of evidence, and appendix 1887 ISBN 0-7165-0705-6
- Volume 6: Report from the Select Committee on Town Holdings with minutes of evidence, appendix and index, 1888. ISBN 0-7165-0706-4
- Volume 7: Report from the Select Committee on Town Holdings with an index, 1889 ISBN 0-7165-0707-2
- Volume 8: Report from the Select Committee on Town Holdings with minutes of evidence, appendix and index, 1890. ISBN 0-7165-0708-0
- Volume 9: Select Committee Reports on Town Holdings with proceedings, minutes of evidence, appendices and indexes, 1890-1892, ISBN 0-7165-0709-9
- Volume 10: Reports from Select Committees on Town Improvements with minutes of evidence, appendix and index, 1890-1894 ISBN 0-7165-0844-3
