= George Hare Leonard =

George Hare Leonard (30 January 1863 – 31 January 1941), known as G. H. Leonard, was the Henry Overton Wills Professor of Modern History at the University of Bristol from 1905 to 1928.

== Life ==
G. H. Leonard was born in Clifton, Somerset, the second son of George Hare Leonard, JP (1826–1913) and Eliza Berry ‘Leila’, née Everett (1835–1925). He was educated at Clevedon School and Mill Hill School, at University College, Bristol, and at Clare College, Cambridge, where he was awarded a first-class BA in the Historical Tripos in 1884.

Upon leaving Cambridge, he was a Lecturer for the Cambridge Extension Lectures Syndicate from 1884 to 1891, and the first of its academic staff to lecture in Cambridge itself. He was then the first Warden of the Broad Plain House Settlement, Bristol, from 1891 to 1900. He was appointed a lecturer in History and Literature at University College, Bristol, in 1901. He was active in the workers' education movement, and was a president of the Workers' Educational Association in Bristol and the West.

Leonard died in 1941 at Barnwood House Hospital in Gloucester. In his obituary in The Times, he was described as "devoted less to the study than to the teaching of history, using it as an instrument for educating mind and character alike. He always chose to dwell on the social and cultural aspects of history, and his interpretations were marked by great imaginative sympathy." After his death, his widow and second cousin – Mary Leonard, née Warren (1868–1928) – endowed the "George Hare Leonard Memorial Lecture" and the "George Hare Leonard Prize" at the University of Bristol, the latter given for the best overall performance in Part II examinations in History.

== Works ==
- He wrote the lyrics for "It is the day of all the year", a carol for Mothering Sunday set to a Mediaeval tune and included in the 1928 edition of Oxford Book of Carols.
- Leonard, George Hare (1909). Nobler Cares (2nd ed.). Simpkin, Marshall, Hamilton, Kent & Co. ASIN B004Q15EI2.
- Leonard, George Hare (1914). Love Came Down at Christmas. London, England: Oxford University Press.
- Leonard, George Hare (1915). They Also Serve. London, England: London: Student Christian Movement. ASIN B003S7PNZE.
