= Charles Townsend (British politician) =

British politician (1832–1908)

Member of Parliament for Bristol North
- In office 4 July 1892 – 13 July 1895
- Preceded by: Lewis Fry
- Succeeded by: Lewis Fry

Personal details
- Born: 1832 United Kingdom
- Died: 4 November 1908 (aged 76) United Kingdom
- Party: Liberal

Charles Townsend (1832 – November 4, 1908) was a British Liberal politician who represented Bristol North in the House of Commons from 1892 to 1895.

== Electoral history ==
General election 1892: Bristol North
Party	Candidate	Votes	%	±%
Liberal	Charles Townsend	4,409	52.0	+8.7
Liberal Unionist	Lewis Fry	4,064	48.0	−8.7
Majority		345	4.0	N/A
Turnout		8,473	78.0	+7.7
Registered electors		10,862		
Liberal gain from Liberal Unionist		Swing	+8.7	

General election 1895: Bristol North
Party	Candidate	Votes	%	±%
Liberal Unionist	Lewis Fry	4,702	51.3	+3.3
Liberal	Charles Townsend	4,464	48.7	−3.3
Majority		238	2.6	N/A
Turnout		9,166	79.8	+1.8
Registered electors		11,490		
Liberal Unionist gain from Liberal		Swing	+3.3	
