= Augustine Birrell =

British politician (1850–1933)

The Right Honourable Augustine Birrell KC
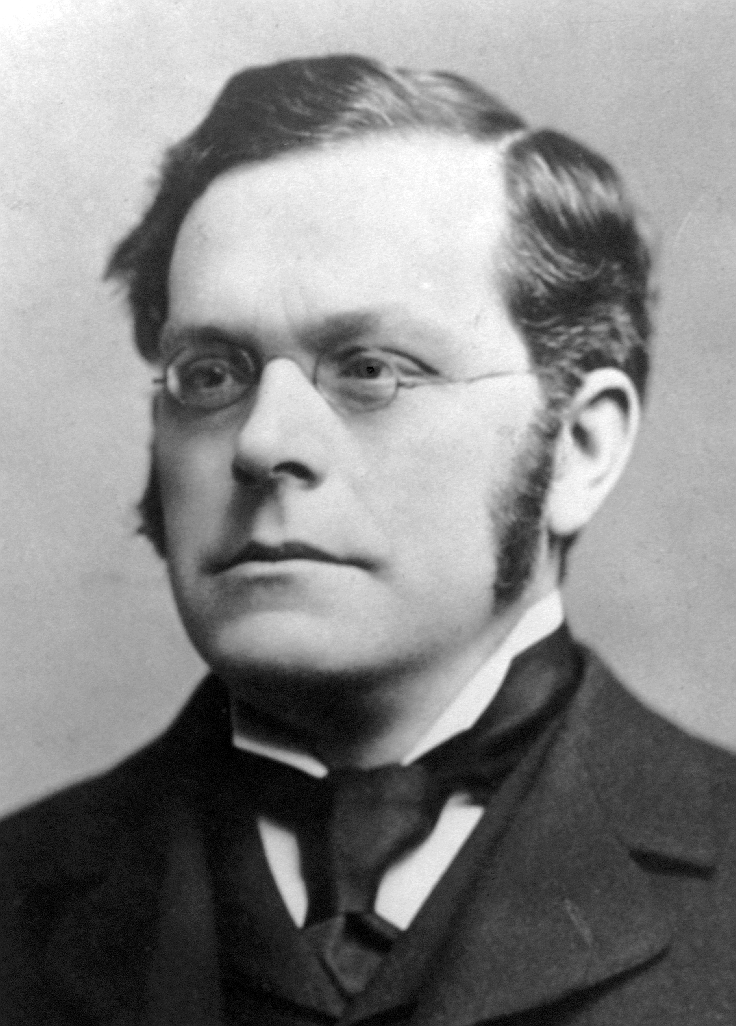

President of the Board of Education
- In office 10 December 1905 – 23 January 1907
- Monarch: Edward VII
- Prime Minister: Sir Henry Campbell-Bannerman
- Preceded by: The Marquess of Londonderry
- Succeeded by: Reginald McKenna

Chief Secretary for Ireland
- In office 23 January 1907 – 3 May 1916
- Monarchs: Edward VII; George V
- Prime Minister: Sir Henry Campbell-Bannerman; H. H. Asquith
- Preceded by: James Bryce
- Succeeded by: Sir Henry Duke

Personal details
- Born: 19 January 1850 Wavertree, Liverpool, England
- Died: 20 November 1933 (aged 83) London, England
- Party: Liberal
- Spouse(s): Margaret Mirrielees (d. 1879); Eleanor Tennyson (d. 1915)
- Education: Trinity Hall, Cambridge

Augustine Birrell KC (19 January 1850 – 20 November 1933) was a British Liberal Party politician, who was Chief Secretary for Ireland from 1907 to 1916. In this post, he was praised for enabling tenant farmers to own their property and for extending university education for Catholics. He was criticised for failing to take action against Irish rebels before the Easter Rising, leading to his subsequent resignation. A barrister by training, he was also an author noted for humorous essays.

== Early life ==
Birrell was born in Wavertree, Liverpool the son of The Rev. Charles Mitchell Birrell (1811–1880), a Scottish Baptist minister and Harriet Jane Grey (1811–1863) daughter of Rev Henry Grey of Edinburgh.

He was educated at Amersham Hall school and at Trinity Hall, Cambridge, where he was made an Honorary Fellow in 1879. He joined the Sylvan Debating Club in 1872. He started work in a solicitor's office in Liverpool but was called to the Bar in 1875, becoming a KC in 1893 and a Bencher of the Inner Temple in 1903. From 1896 to 1899 he was Professor of Comparative Law at University College, London. In 1911 Birrell served as Lord Rector of Glasgow University.

His first wife, Margaret Mirrielees, died in 1879, only a year after their marriage, and in 1888 he married Eleanor Tennyson, daughter of the poet Frederick Locker-Lampson and widow of Lionel Tennyson, son of the poet Alfred, Lord Tennyson. They had two sons, one of whom, Frankie (1889–1935) was later a journalist and critic and associated with the Bloomsbury Group. Birrell found success as a writer with the publication of a volume of essays entitled Obiter Dicta in 1884. This was followed by a second series of Obiter Dicta in 1887 and Res Judicatae in 1892. These, despite their titles, were not concerned with law, but he also wrote books on copyright and on trusts. Birrell wrote and spoke, with a characteristic humour which became known as birrelling.

== Entry into politics ==
Augustine Birrell c1895

After unsuccessfully contesting parliamentary seats in Liverpool, Walton in 1885 and Widnes in 1886, Birrell was elected to parliament for West Fife at a by-election in 1889, as a Liberal. He retained his seat in the general elections of 1892 and 1895, but in the general election of 1900 he stood in Manchester North East and was defeated. In 1903 he edited Eight Years of Tory Government, a "handbook for the use of Liberals", which attacked the incumbent Conservative administration's record on issues such as housing and worker's compensation.

== President of the Board of Education ==
In December 1905 Birrell was included in the cabinet of Sir Henry Campbell-Bannerman as President of the Board of Education, and that month he was sworn of the Privy Council. He was returned for Bristol North at the general election of January 1906, in which the Liberals won a large majority. Like Campbell-Bannerman, Birrell belonged to the Radical tradition of the party. Birrell also belonged to a group called the "New Radicals" or "New Liberals", which also included H. H. Asquith, R. B. Haldane and Sir Edward Grey.

Birrell introduced the Education Bill 1906, intended to address nonconformist grievances arising from the Education Act 1902. The bill passed the Liberal-dominated House of Commons comfortably, but the House of Lords, with a Conservative majority, passed wrecking amendments which undermined its meaning, and the government dropped it. This use of dilatory parliamentary procedures and wrecking amendments over the education bill began a period of political tension between the Commons and Lords which ultimately concluded with the Lords' rejection of the People's Budget of 1909, sparking the Constitutional Crises of 1909–11.

Birrell had been seen as a poor advocate for the bill, although he complained privately that it was mainly Lloyd George's work, and that he himself had had little say over its contents. The defeat of the bill made it impossible for Birrell to continue in his post, and in January 1907 he was appointed Chief Secretary for Ireland, to replace James Bryce who had been made Ambassador to the United States. While serving in government, Birrell supported a number of progressive measures and proposals such as expanded housing provisions, land reform, substantial increases in education spending at both primary and secondary level, and the provision of school meals.

== Birrell and Women's Suffrage ==
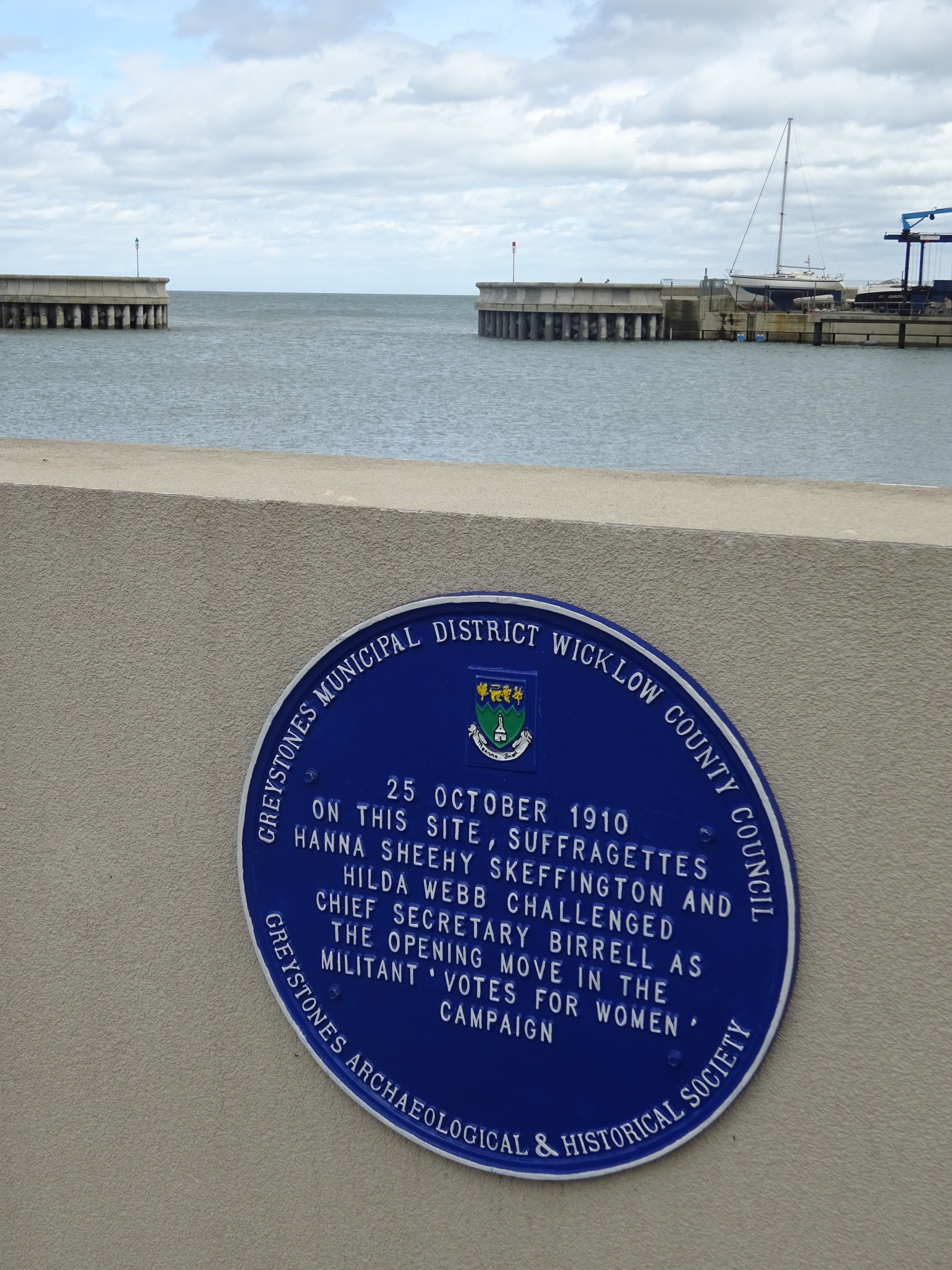
Plaque in Greystones, Ireland commemorating the events of 25 October 1910, when Hanna Sheehy-Skeffington and Hilda Webb challenged Birrell on the suffrage issue.

Like many of his political colleagues and members of the general public, Birrell strongly disapproved of the militancy and violence of the Women's Social and Political Union (WSPU; suffragettes). In November 1910, when walking alone from the House of Commons, he was set upon by a group of about twenty suffragettes who had recognised him. While he did not believe there was any serious attempt to injure him, in trying to escape he twisted his knee and "slipped the knee-cap". C. P. Scott wrote in his diary that Birrell feared he might require an operation to remove his kneecap and joked that, if he did, he would remain "a weak-kneed politician" to the end of his life. Birrell was, however, described by the paper Votes for Women as one of a number of "Suffragist members of the Cabinet" who met with a deputation from the National Union of Women's Suffrage Societies (NUWSS), led by Millicent Fawcett, on 8 August 1913, following a similar meeting by the NUWSS with Prime Minister Asquith on the same day. According to Votes for Women, The Times reported that the ministers asked the deputation what kind of bill the NUWSS was looking for. Other ministers present included Lloyd George, John Simon, Francis Dyke Acland and Thomas McKinnon Wood.

== Chief Secretary for Ireland ==
=== Council Bill, Universities Bill and Land Bill ===
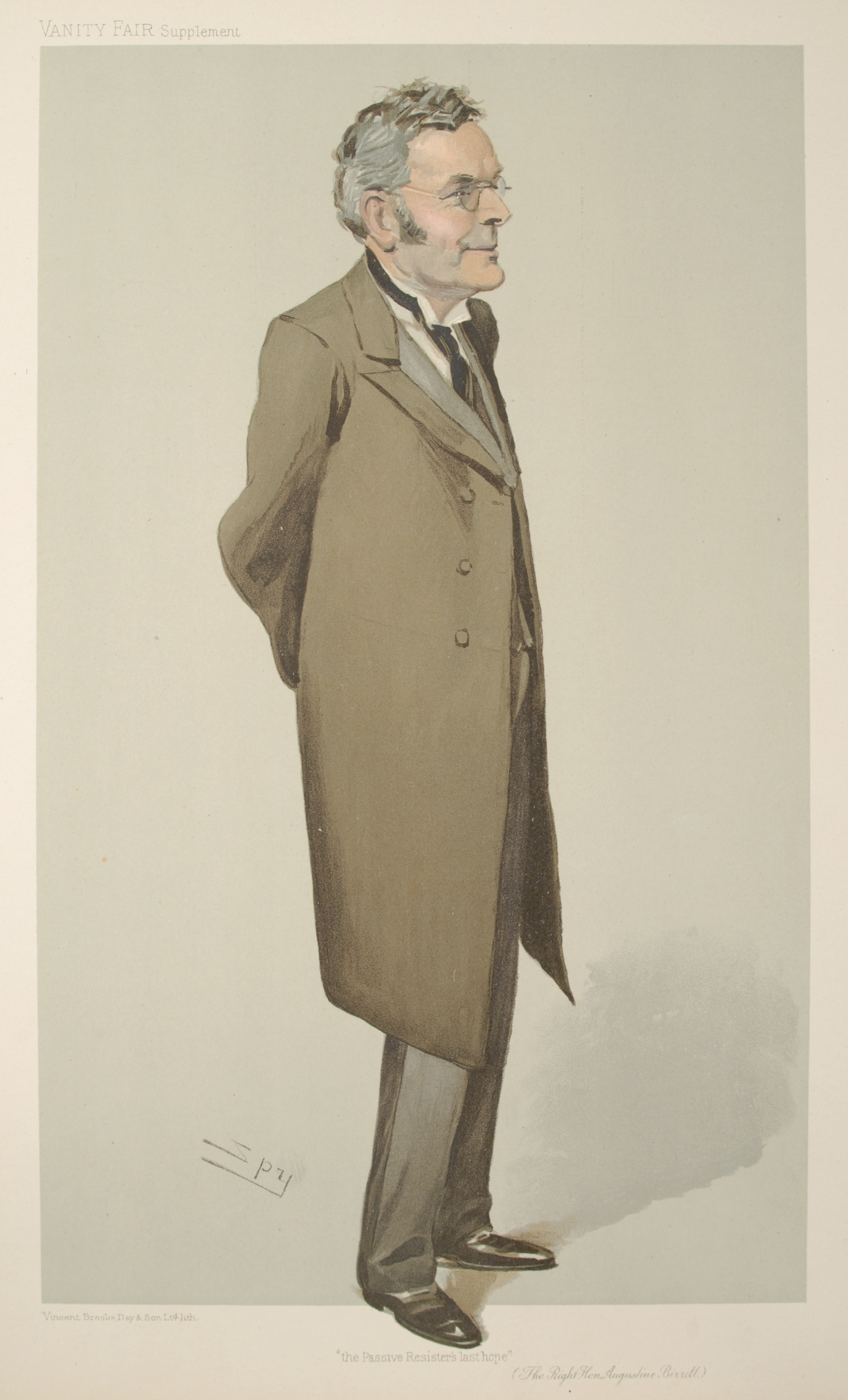
Birrell caricatured by Spy for Vanity Fair, 1906

Birrell's first Under-Secretary and head of Irish Civil Service at Dublin Castle administration was Sir Antony MacDonnell, who had worked successfully with a previous Chief Secretary, George Wyndham, on the Land Purchase (Ireland) Act 1903. MacDonnell was a well-known advocate for Home Rule. MacDonnell's proposals for what was called "devolution" – the transfer of local powers to Ireland under a central authority – adopted by the Irish Reform Association's - had encountered strong opposition from Unionists, leading eventually to Wyndham's resignation. This proposal ultimately passed from Sir James Bryce with Birrell inheriting the bill. Birrell modified MacDonnell's proposal and on 7 May 1907 introduced the Irish Council Bill. The bill was initially welcomed by Nationalist leaders John Redmond and John Dillon, and opposed, for different reasons, by unionists and by more radical nationalists who wanted nothing less than Home Rule for Ireland. At a convention of the United Irish League, opposition was so strong that Redmond changed his position; the convention rejected the bill and the government was unable to proceed with it. Birrell suffered further embarrassment when he sought to discontinue the use of the Irish Crimes Act 1887, a coercive measure introduced by Arthur Balfour to deal with agrarian crime, only to be faced with an increase in cattle-driving. Another affair, in which Birrell was not directly involved but for which he had to take part of the blame, was the theft of the Irish Crown Jewels from Dublin Castle (where the Chief Secretary had his offices) in July 1907.

Birrell had more success in areas such as Education and the Irish land question. His excellent relations with both Roman Catholic and Protestant church leaders such as the Archbishop of Dublin William Walsh ensured the successful passage of the Irish Universities Bill 1908, which established the National University of Ireland and Queen's University Belfast and dissolved the Royal University of Ireland. It solved the sectarian problem in higher education by dividing the Protestant and Catholic traditions into their own separate spheres and ensured Catholic, Nationalist scholars had access to university education. Contemporaries also praised his achievement in carrying the Land Purchase (Ireland) Act 1909, which though falling far short in its financial provisions allowed for compulsory purchase by the Land Commission of large areas of land for the relief of congestion, through a hostile House of Lords.

=== Home Rule Bill ===
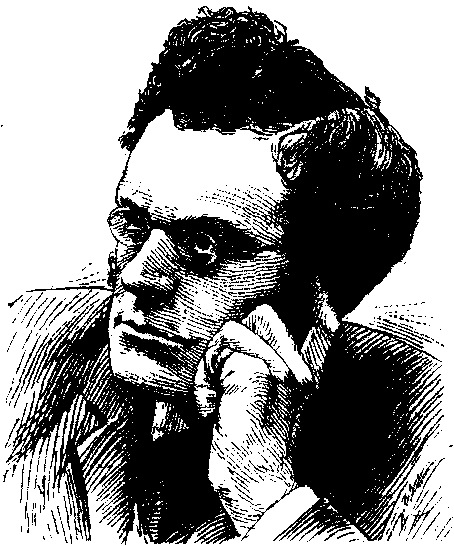
Sketch of Augustine Birrell

After the passing, with the support of the Irish Parliamentary Party, of the Parliament Act 1911, which restricted the power of the Lords to veto bills, Prime Minister H. H. Asquith introduced the Third Home Rule Bill on 16 April 1912. The Unionists, led in Ireland by Edward Carson and in Britain by Tory leader Bonar Law, formed a private army, the Ulster Volunteers, to resist enforcement of the act, and Carson proposed an amendment excluding Ulster from the scope of the bill. Birrell was opposed to the exclusion of any part of the country and when David Lloyd George proposed a compromise involving the exclusion of six of the nine counties of Ulster for a period of five to six years Birrell responded by offering his resignation. Historian Ronan Fanning, in a newspaper article, has described him as "the arch hypocrite" because of his public criticisms of such exclusion proposals, but private acceptance of same. The proposal was rejected by both Unionists and Nationalists and Birrell stayed on. In fact, by that stage Lloyd George had effectively replaced Birrell as the Liberal government's negotiator in the Home Rule discussions. The crisis continued through 1913 and into 1914. The bill was introduced for the third time in July 1914, this time along with an amending bill allowing for the exclusion of some of the Ulster counties, but with the outbreak of World War I the bill was passed without further debate, with its implementation suspended until after the war. However, on the collapse of Asquith's Liberal-dominated government in May 1915 and its replacement with a coalition involving Carson, the implementation of Home Rule at any stage became moot.

=== World War ===
In the latter part of 1915, Birrell was one of those Liberal ministers (others being Reginald McKenna (Chancellor of the Exchequer), Walter Runciman (President of the Board of Trade) and Sir Edward Grey (Foreign Secretary)) who were unhappy at the realignment of Britain's war effort towards conscription, total war and a massive commitment of troops to the Western Front, as advocated by the CIGS Archibald Murray. However, none of these joined Sir John Simon (Home Secretary) in resigning in protest at the conscription of bachelors, due to be enacted in January 1916. However, Birrell wrote to the Prime Minister (29 December) criticizing Murray and arguing that he and Runciman agreed that finance and strategic policy were more important than conscription. Conscription was only applied in Britain, not Ireland.

=== Easter Rising ===
A further threat to Birrell's administration had arisen with the formation in November 1913 of the Irish Volunteers, ostensibly to safeguard Home rule but in fact, under the influence of the Irish Republican Brotherhood (IRB) aiming to break the union with Britain altogether. Feelings in nationalist Ireland were further aroused by the possibility of conscription. Sir Matthew Nathan, Birrell's Under-Secretary since October 1914, told him in September 1915 that the Nationalist Party was losing ground in the country and that extreme nationalists, often referred to as Sinn Féiners, were gaining support. Nathan took measures such as suppressing newspapers and forcing Irish Volunteer organisers to leave the country. The Irish Party leaders, Redmond and Dillon, cautioned against taking direct action against the 'Sinn Féiners' and the administration kept to that policy. Birrell himself felt that the danger of a bomb outrage was greater than that of an insurrection. His assessment was proved wrong when the Easter Rising began on 24 April 1916.

Birrell had spent Easter in London, where Nathan had telegraphed him with news of the capture and scuttling of the arms ship the Aud and the arrest of Sir Roger Casement. He had just sent approval for the arrest of the movement's leaders on Easter Monday morning when he was told by Viscount French, Commander-in-Chief of the British Home Forces, that the Rising had begun. He maintained contact with Nathan by telegraph and answered questions in Parliament on Tuesday and Wednesday, then travelled by destroyer to Dublin, arriving in the early hours of Thursday morning. From there he wrote to the Prime Minister, giving him his assessment of the situation. In one of his letters he wrote that he 'couldn't go on'. On 1 May, the day after the Rising ended, Asquith accepted his resignation 'with infinite regret'. This regret was also felt by both Nationalist and Unionist politicians in Parliament. While some, such as Laurence Ginnell celebrated his departure, both John Redmond and Sir Edward Carson praised the work Birrell completed during his time as chief secretary. Others, such as the Irish civil servant, Sir Henry Robinson, also praised the work Birrell completed and highlighted in his memoirs the number of Acts of Parliament Birrell was responsible for. However, The Royal Commission on the 1916 Rebellion (the Hardinge commission) was critical of Birrell and Nathan, in particular their failure to take action against the rebels in the weeks and months before the Rising. Birrell acknowledged in his memoirs that he did not stoutly defend himself in front of the commission. However, the commission did understand that Birrell was confined to London due to his cabinet and parliamentary duties between 1914 and 1916.

== Personal life ==
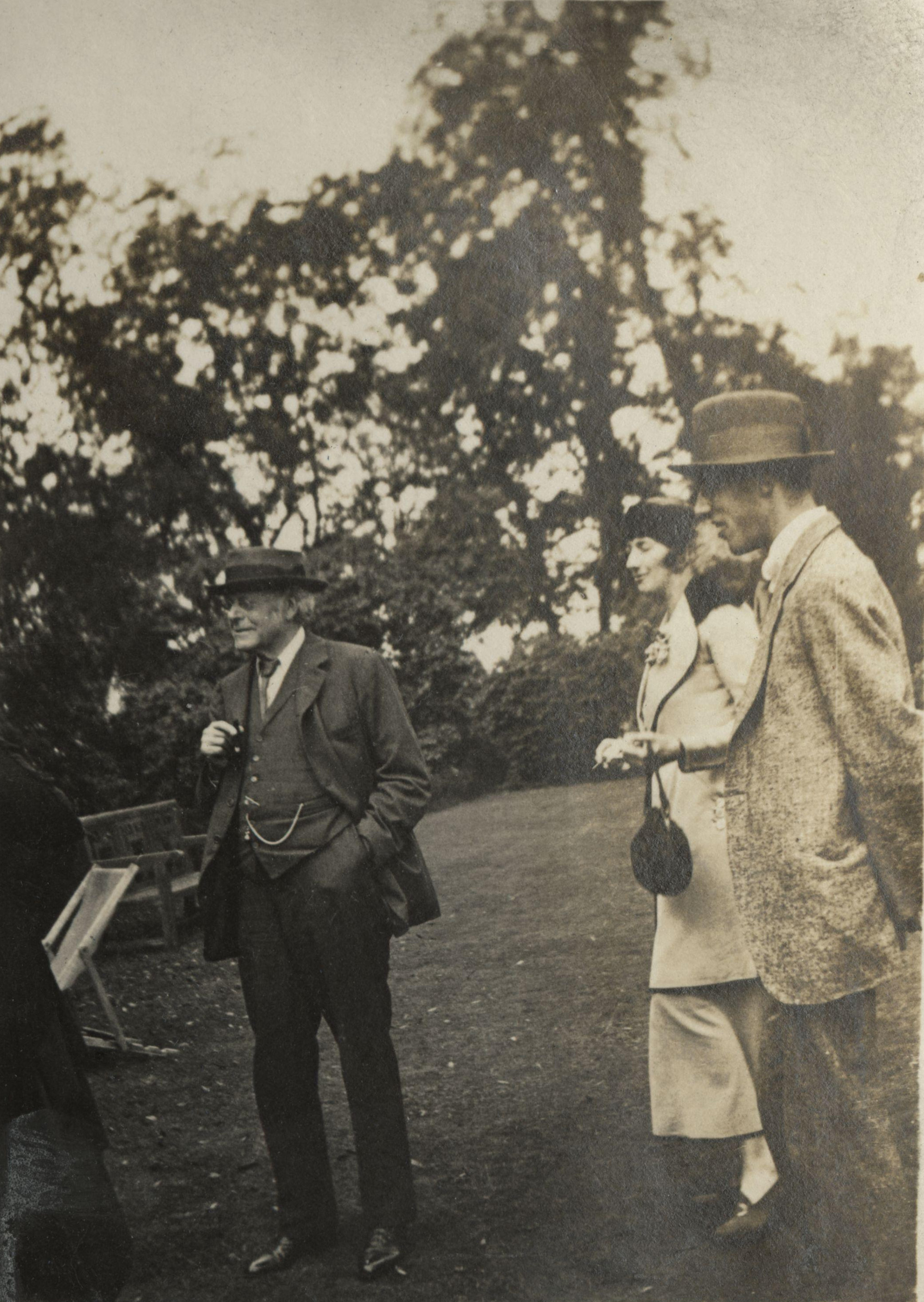
Birrell with his son Anthony and Katharine Asquith

While Birrell's first phase as Chief Secretary was a clear success, the period from about 1912 onwards saw something of a decline in Birrell's career which was also mirrored in his domestic life. Birrell's second wife Eleanor had been suffering from an inoperable brain tumour and this eventually caused her to lose her sanity. This affected Birrell deeply, privately and publicly, but he did not tell his political colleagues, who were simply given to understand that she did not care for social life. There were two sons of the marriage, Francis and Anthony.

Birrell was a member of J.M. Barrie's cricket team, the Allahakbarries, along with other notable writers, such as Jerome K. Jerome and Arthur Conan Doyle. Birrell, however, was not a good cricketer and Barrie was shocked to discover that Birrell did not know which way to hold the bat.

The quality of his public work deteriorated and as one historian has noted the severe personal strain must have been a contributory factor in "...the uncharacteristic combination of excessive zeal and indecision which marked [Birrell's] response to the Dublin industrial agitation of 1913". Only after Eleanor died in 1915 did Birrell begin to regain some of his old energy and effectiveness as a minister.

== Later life ==
Birrell did not defend his seat in the 1918 general election, nor did he ever return to Ireland. In 1929, he accepted an honorary doctorate from the National University of Ireland, but storms in the Irish Sea prevented him from making the crossing and he had to receive his degree in absentia. He returned to literature with a further volume of essays and book reviews, More Obiter Dicta (1920) and a book on his father-in-law, Frederick Locker-Lampson. He died in London on 20 November 1933, aged eighty-three. His autobiography, Things Past Redress, was published posthumously.

== Selected works ==
- Obiter Dicta, Elliot Stock, 1885
- Res Judicatae: Papers and Essays, Charles Scribner's Sons 1892
- Essays about Men, Women, and Books, Elliot Stock, 1895
- Collected Essays, Elliot Stock, 1899 (comprising Obiter Dicta; Res Judicatae; Essays about Men, Women, and Books)
- Miscellanies, Elliot Stock, 1901
- Essays and Addresses, Charles Scribner's Sons, 1901 (same content as Miscellanies)
- William Hazlitt, Macmillan, 1902
- Eight Years of Tory Government, 1895-1903; home affairs; handbook for the use of liberals London, 1903
- In the Name of the Bodleian, and Other Essays, Elliot Stock, 1905
- Andrew Marvell, Macmillan, 1905
- Selected Essays: 1884–1907, Thomas Nelson, 1909
- Self-Selected Essays : a Second Series, Nelson, 1917
- More Obiter Dicta, W. Heinemann ltd., 1924
- Et Cetera: A Collection, Chatto and Windus, 1930
- Things Past Redress London, 1937

== Papers ==
The main collection of Birrell's papers, those dealing with his period as Chief Secretary, are deposited in the Bodleian Library. The Bodleian also contains collections of Birrell's public correspondence with political figures of his day, Asquith, Lewis Harcourt and others. Birrell's correspondence with Campbell-Bannerman and Herbert Gladstone are in the British Library. His correspondence with Lloyd George is in the Parliamentary Archives. Correspondence with Herbert Samuel is in King's College, Cambridge. Other collections can be found in the National Library of Ireland, Lambeth Palace, National Library of Scotland and Trinity College Dublin. His family correspondence is deposited in the University of Liverpool.

Parliament of the United Kingdom
Preceded by Robert Preston Bruce	Member of Parliament for West Fife; 1889–1900	Succeeded by John Hope
Preceded by Sir Frederick Wills, Bt	Member of Parliament for Bristol North; 1906–1918	Succeeded by Stanley Gange
Political offices
Preceded by The Marquess of Londonderry	President of the Board of Education; 1905–1907	Succeeded by Reginald McKenna
Preceded by James Bryce	Chief Secretary for Ireland; 1907–1916	Succeeded by Sir Henry Duke
Party political offices
Preceded by Robert Spence Watson	President of the National Liberal Federation; 1902–1906	Succeeded by Arthur Dyke Acland
Academic offices
Preceded by The Earl Curzon of Kedleston	Rector of the University of Glasgow; 1911—1914	Succeeded by Raymond Poincaré
