= Stanley Gange =

British politician

Edwin Stanley Gange (1871 – 29 February 1944) was an English merchant and Liberal politician.

== Personal life and career ==
Gange was born in Bristol, the son of the Reverend Edwin Gorsuch Gange, a nationally known Baptist minister who was the pastor of the Broadmead Chapel for nearly 25 years . In 1895, at Bristol, he married Alice Maud Denning and they had two sons, William (b. 1896) and Gerald (b. 1900) Gange went into trade and is usually described as a merchant. He also had interests in property and was Director of Lennards, a Bristol property company.

== Political and public life ==
Gange was drawn into politics, his nonconformist religion and his commercial interests attracting him to the Liberal Party. He was a co-opted member of Bristol Town Council and was he Chairman of Bristol North Liberal Association during the time Augustine Birrell (also a Baptist) was MP for the constituency. He involved himself in the public life of Bristol, serving as a justice of the peace and in 1931–32, he was Sheriff of Bristol.

After a long Parliamentary and ministerial career, but one which ended in comparative failure with his resignation as Chief Secretary for Ireland in the aftermath of the Easter Rising, Augustine Birrell decided not to contest the 1918 general election. Bristol Liberals selected Gange as his successor and he fought Bristol North as a Coalition Liberal. He was not opposed by the Unionists and he was presumably awarded the Coalition coupon. In a three cornered fight with Labour and National Party candidates he won over 60% of the vote, with a majority of 6,393 over Labour. However he did not stand for re-election in 1922 and did not contest any further Parliamentary elections.

Gange retained his association with the Liberals after 1922, serving as the President of the Bristol Liberal Club after leaving Parliament. After the political crisis which led to the formation of the National Government in 1931, he supported the Liberal Nationals, lending his weight to campaigns supporting Robert Bernays, the National candidate in Bristol North.

== Papers ==
There are some papers relating to Gange deposited in the Bristol Archives. These are biographical notes, giving family and business details as well covering his political career. There news cuttings and a visitors' book relating to his time as Sheriff in 1931–32.

Parliament of the United Kingdom
Preceded by Augustine Birrell	Member of Parliament for Bristol North; 1918 – 1922	Succeeded by Henry Guest
