= Bristol Medical School =

Medical school in Bristol, England

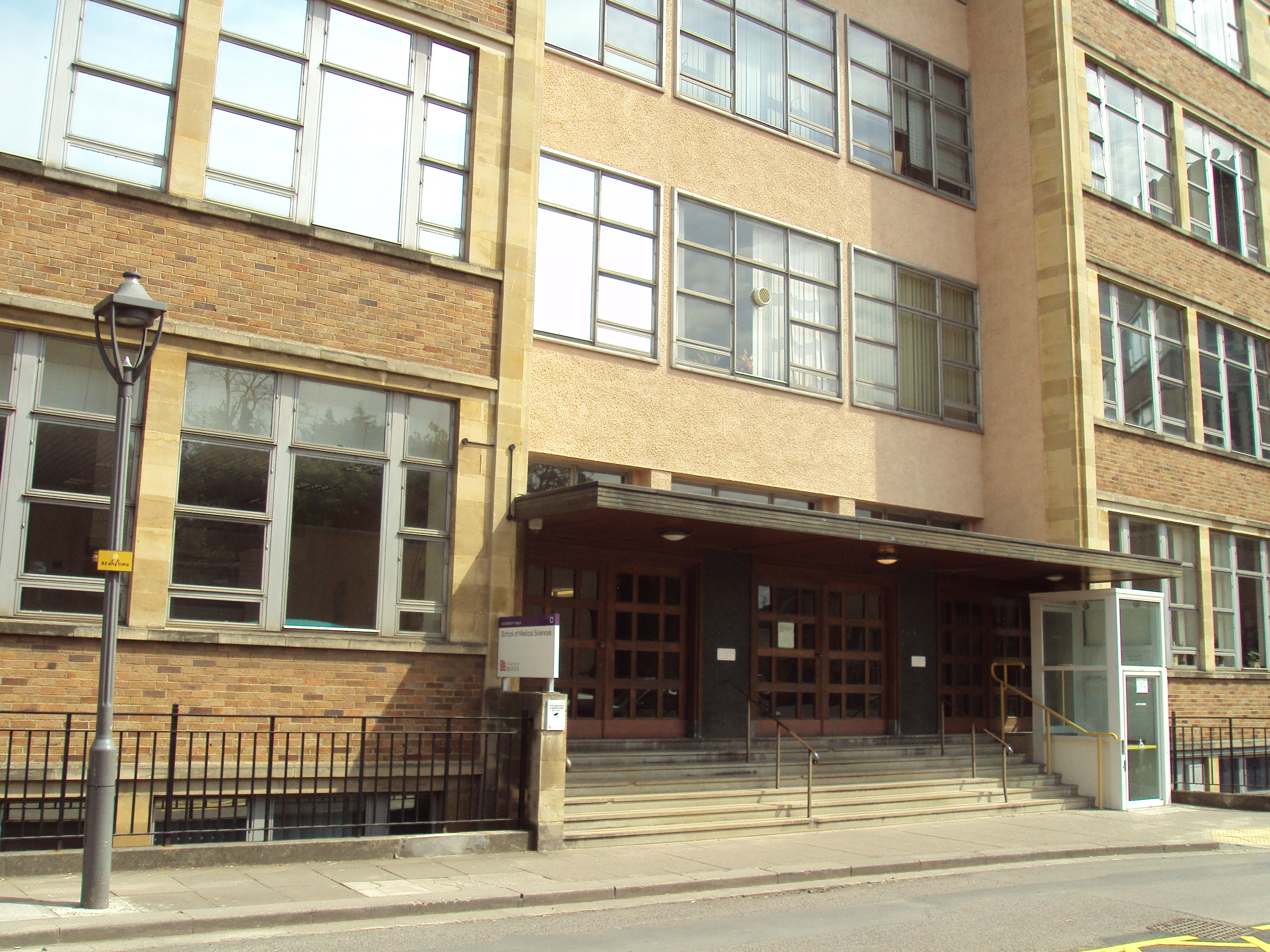
- Biomedical Sciences Building, University of Bristol
- Type: Medical School
- Established: 1833 – Established; 1893 – Merged with University College, Bristol
- Parent institution: University of Bristol
- Head of School: Professor Chrissie Thirlwell
- Students: ~287 per year
- Location: Bristol, United Kingdom

Bristol Medical School is a medical school located in Bristol, South West England. Originally an independent medical institution from 1833 to 1893, it later merged with University College, Bristol, the predecessor of the University of Bristol.

Today, it is part of the Faculty of Health Sciences at the University of Bristol and awards the university's primary medical qualification, the MB ChB degree in medicine. The school is divided into two departments: Population Health Sciences, which focuses on public health and epidemiology, and Clinical Sciences, which covers anatomy, physiology and pharmacology.

Bristol Medical School offers two medical degree pathways: a five-year MB ChB programme and a six-year MB ChB Gateway to Medicine programme with a foundation year.

== History ==
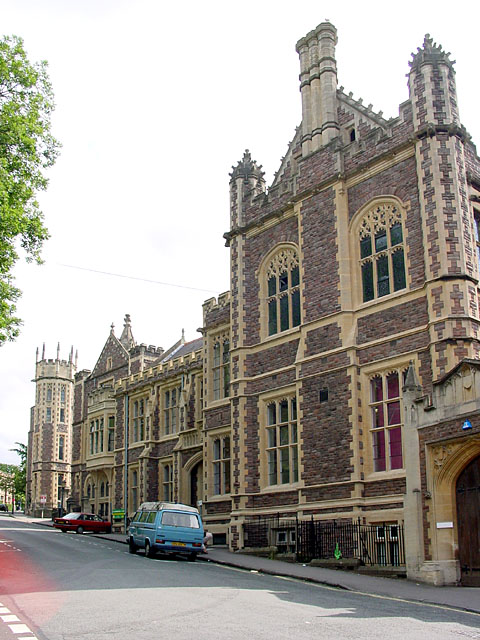
The Geographical Sciences Building, which originally housed the medical school.

Bristol Medical School was founded in 1833 to provide medical training to those who worked on the wards of Bristol Infirmary (founded 1737), the Clifton Dispensary (founded 1812) and the General Hospital (founded 1832). While it became affiliated with University College Bristol from its opening in 1876, the medical school was the only part of the college to refuse entry to women, who were not admitted until 1907.

In 2017, the school relaunched its MB ChB programme under the new MB21 Curriculum, developed in collaboration with students and patients. The new curriculum aims to teach medicine to students in a holistic manner, allowing them to appreciate the wider social and wellbeing issues that may lead to ill-health.

== Entry requirements ==
As of 2025, the medical school accepts some 251 home students and a further 19 from overseas onto its MB ChB programmes.

Entry onto the MB ChB programme is competitive with high entry standards. Requirements for 2025 entry were AAA at A Level, in Chemistry and either Biology, Physics, Mathematics or Further Mathematics. Graduate entry students must obtain a 2:1 in their degree plus BBB at A-level in the above subjects. The UCAT score is also considered, with high shortlisting cut-offs. The following shows the UCAT cut-off scores attained for those who were invited to interview in recent years:

- 2025 Entry: 3010 (Home), 3080 (International)
- 2024 Entry: 2940 (Home), 2960 (International)
- 2023 Entry: 2910 (Home), 2960 (International)
- 2022 Entry: 2870 (Home), 2910 (International)
- 2021 Entry: 2830 (Home), 2750 (International)

== Rankings and reputation ==
Rankings
2024/25 Rankings	Domestic	International
THE (2025)	9	=54
QS (2025)	=10	=59
Guardian (2024)	11	N/A
Complete University Guide (2025)	6	N/A

Bristol Medical School consistently ranks amongst the top medical programmes in the country. Its graduates are well prepared for further training, with Bristol Medical School graduates some of the highest performing in postgraduate speciality exams.

== Course structure ==
Bristol Medical School follows a case-based learning (CBL) integrated curriculum with early clinical exposure. From Year 1, students are placed in primary and secondary care settings across the region, establishing a strong clinical foundation. Year 2 introduces disease processes and differential diagnoses, maintaining a focus on patient-centred care through clinical placements. In Year 3, students join Bristol's Clinical Academies- various healthcare settings across the South West- where they gain hands-on experience meeting patients and observing NHS treatment pathways. This clinical academy structure is built on in year 4, as students learn to care for patients across the whole range of life stages in a variety of settings. Year 5 allows for students to choose an elective, with the option to study abroad. This year also involves intense preparation for foundation year training, with a strong emphasis on team work and decision making.

Bristol medical students also have the option to intercalate between years 3 and 4, extending their degree by a year. There are a wide variety of degrees to choose, with the option to intercalate externally if wanted.

The university works with a large number of health care providers across the region, with the Bristol Royal Infirmary serving as the major teaching hospital. Southmead Hospital, Royal United Hospital, Bristol Royal Hospital for Children, Yeovil Hospital and Weston General Hospital are just some of the other hospitals that facilitate clinical teaching for the medical school.
