= 1878 Bristol by-election =

UK Parliamentary by-election

- 16 December 1878

Constituency of Bristol
- Registered: 24,851
- Turnout: 68.96%
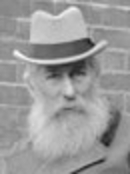
	First party	Second party
	Lib
Candidate	Lewis Fry	Ivor Guest
Party	Liberal	Conservative
Popular vote	9,342	7,795
Percentage	54.51%	45.49%
MP before election
Kirkman Hodgson
Liberal
Elected MP
Lewis Fry
Liberal

The 1878 Bristol by-election was fought on 14 December 1878. The by-election was fought due to the resignation of the incumbent Liberal MP, Kirkman Hodgson. It was won by the Liberal candidate Lewis Fry.

By-Election 16 December 1878: Bristol
Party	Candidate	Votes	%	±%
Liberal	Lewis Fry	9,342	54.51	+2.4
Conservative	Ivor Guest	7,795	45.49	−2.4
Majority		1,547	9.02	+8.5
Turnout		17,137	68.96	−4.9
Registered electors		24,851		
Liberal hold		Swing	+2.4	
