= Lewis Fry =

British Quaker, lawyer, philanthropist and politician

The Right Honourable Lewis Fry DL
- Fry in 1895.

Member of Parliament for Bristol North
- In office 13 July 1895 – 25 September 1900
- Preceded by: Charles Townsend
- Succeeded by: Sir Frederick Wills
- In office 24 November 1885 – 28 June 1892
- Preceded by: Constituency created
- Succeeded by: Charles Townsend

Member of Parliament for Bristol
- In office 16 December 1878 – 24 November 1885 Serving with Samuel Morley
- Preceded by: Kirkman Hodgson
- Succeeded by: Constituency abolished

Personal details
- Born: 16 April 1832
- Died: 10 September 1921 (aged 89)
- Party: Liberal Party; Liberal Unionist Party
- Spouse: Elizabeth Pease Gibson (m. 1858; died 1870)
- Children: Lewis George; Elizabeth Wyatt; Francis Gibson; Millicent Mary; Anna Theodora

Lewis Fry DL (16 April 1832 – 10 September 1921) was a Quaker, lawyer, philanthropist and a Liberal and later Liberal Unionist politician who sat in the House of Commons in three spells between 1878 and 1900.

== Early life ==
Fry was the son of Joseph Fry (1795–1879) and his wife Mary Anne Swaine (1797–1886) and was a member of the Fry family known for their chocolate business. He was articled to a Quaker Solicitor, Joseph Bevan Braithwaite, who had also trained his elder brother, Edward Fry. He was admitted in 1854 and practiced in Bristol until he entered Parliament.

== Parliamentary service ==
Fry was Liberal Member of Parliament (MP) for Bristol between 1878 and 1885, and a Liberal and Unionist for Bristol North between 1885–1892 and 1895–1900.

He was sworn a member of the Privy Council after the accession of King Edward VII on 24 January 1901 and was appointed a deputy lieutenant of Gloucestershire shortly thereafter.

He was Chairman of Parliamentary Committee on Town Holdings, 1886–1892 and author of two reports of same.

== Other public service ==
Fry served on Bristol Town Council from 1866 to 1884.

When School Boards were introduced, Lewis Fry was elected the first Chair of the Bristol School Board. He drew up an influential scheme for religious education in elementary schools.

He supported a number of Bristol public institutions: the School of Science and Art, the Museum and Library and the Evening Classes Association and the local branch of the Charities Organization Society.

He was on the council of Clifton College and was President of the High School for Girls.

He served on the council of the Law Society.

He was also the president of the Anchor Society in Bristol in 1868.

Fry is considered to be an important figure in the creation and early development of the University of Bristol. He was the first chairman of the council of the University of Bristol. An annual public lecture at the university is his memorial.

One of his chief pleasures was his interest in art, and was himself an amateur painter.

== Marriage and family ==
On 29 September 1858, he married Elizabeth Pease Gibson, the only daughter of the banker Francis Gibson of Saffron Walden, Essex. They had two sons and three daughters. She died in 1870. Their children are:

- Lewis George (b.3 July 1860)
- Elizabeth Wyatt (b.31 July 1861), married in 1902 to Eugene Hugo Mallett, youngest son of Sir Louis Mallet.
- Francis Gibson (b.25 May 1863)
- Millicent Mary (b. 20 August 1866)
- Anna Theodora (b.24 August 1870)

== Death ==
He lived at Goldney Hall in Clifton. It is now a Hall of Residence of the university. He died shortly after celebrating his 89th birthday.

The Lewis Fry Memorial Lecture was established in 1924 by his surviving children. The endowment provides for an annual lecture to be given by a scholar of distinction on subjects connected with the Fine Arts, History, Literature, Music, Drama, Philosophy, Theology or Education.

== See also ==
- Fry Art Gallery

Parliament of the United Kingdom
Preceded by Kirkman Hodgson and Samuel Morley	Member of Parliament for Bristol; 1878–1885; Served alongside: Samuel Morley	Constituency abolished
New constituency	Member of Parliament for Bristol North; 1885–1892	Succeeded by Charles Townsend
Preceded by Charles Townsend	Member of Parliament for Bristol North; 1895–1900	Succeeded by Sir Frederick Wills, Bt
