= Bristol North =

Parliamentary constituency in the United Kingdom, 1885–1950

Coordinates: 51.50286°N 2.61783°W

- Former borough constituency for the House of Commons
- Major settlements: Bristol

1885–1950
- Seats: One
- Created from: Bristol (abolished)
- Replaced by: Bristol North East (majority); Bristol Central (part)
- During its existence contributed to new seat(s) of: Bristol Central (1918)

Bristol North was a borough constituency which returned one Member of Parliament (MP) to the House of Commons of the UK Parliament from 1885 until it was abolished for the 1950 general election.

== History ==
The seat was one of a small minority spanning the period which never elected a Conservative and Unionist Party candidate. In its early history Bristol North three times elected a Liberal Unionist who was affiliated with the Conservative Party; the latter having declined to field a candidate in those elections and in three others of the eight before World War I. In the eight elections from and including 1918 the Labour Party fielded candidates and won three times; a Unionist stood once without success; candidates considered Lloyd-George Coalition Liberal, National Liberal and Liberal National (reflecting complex splinter groups of the Liberal Party during the period) stood once apiece and an Independent Liberal who was the MP as a mainstream Liberal since the previous election in 1924 ran against the official party's new candidate in 1929, unsuccessfully. In two of these four instances the splinter arguably centrist Liberal candidate won. The Liberal incumbent Bernays also defected from the main body of his party in 1936 to join the National Liberal (1931) Party despite being re-elected as a candidate of the more established party in 1935.

== Boundaries ==
1885–1918: The Municipal Borough of Bristol wards of District, St James's, and St Paul's, and part of North ward, and the local government district of Stapleton.

1918–1950: The County Borough of Bristol wards of District, St Philip and Jacob North, and Stapleton, and part of Easton ward.

== Members of Parliament ==
Election	Member	Party
1885	Lewis Fry	Liberal
1886	Lewis Fry	Liberal Unionist
1892	Charles Townsend	Liberal
1895	Lewis Fry	Liberal Unionist
1900	Frederick Wills	Liberal Unionist
1906	Augustine Birrell	Liberal
1918	Stanley Gange	Coalition Liberal
Jan 1922	Stanley Gange	National Liberal
Nov 1922	Henry Guest	National Liberal
Nov 1923	Henry Guest	Liberal
Dec 1923	Walter Ayles	Labour
1924	Freddie Guest	Liberal
1929	Walter Ayles	Labour
1931	Robert Bernays	Liberal
1936	Robert Bernays	National Liberal
1945	William Coldrick	Labour Co-operative
1950	constituency abolished	

== Elections ==
=== Elections in the 1880s ===
Colston

General election 1885: Bristol North
Party	Candidate	Votes	%	±%
Liberal	Lewis Fry	4,110	57.4	
Conservative	Charles Edward Hungerford Athol Colston	3,046	42.6	
Majority		1,064	14.8	
Turnout		7,156	79.5	
Registered electors		9,002		
Liberal win (new seat)				

Fry

General election 1886: Bristol North
Party	Candidate	Votes	%	±%
Liberal Unionist	Lewis Fry	3,587	56.7	+14.1
Liberal	Alfred Carpenter	2,737	43.3	−14.1
Majority		850	13.4	N/A
Turnout		6,324	70.3	−9.2
Registered electors		9,002		
Liberal Unionist gain from Liberal		Swing	+14.1	

=== Elections in the 1890s ===
General election 1892: Bristol North
Party	Candidate	Votes	%	±%
Liberal	Charles Townsend	4,409	52.0	+8.7
Liberal Unionist	Lewis Fry	4,064	48.0	−8.7
Majority		345	4.0	N/A
Turnout		8,473	78.0	+7.7
Registered electors		10,862		
Liberal gain from Liberal Unionist		Swing	+8.7	

General election 1895: Bristol North
Party	Candidate	Votes	%	±%
Liberal Unionist	Lewis Fry	4,702	51.3	+3.3
Liberal	Charles Townsend	4,464	48.7	−3.3
Majority		238	2.6	N/A
Turnout		9,166	79.8	+1.8
Registered electors		11,490		
Liberal Unionist gain from Liberal		Swing	+3.3	

=== Elections in the 1900s ===
General election 1900: Bristol North
Party	Candidate	Votes	%	±%
Liberal Unionist	Sir Frederick Wills	4,936	54.1	+2.8
Liberal	Sir Clarence Smith	4,182	45.9	−2.8
Majority		754	8.2	+5.6
Turnout		9,118	75.0	−4.8
Registered electors		12,157		
Liberal Unionist hold		Swing	+2.8	

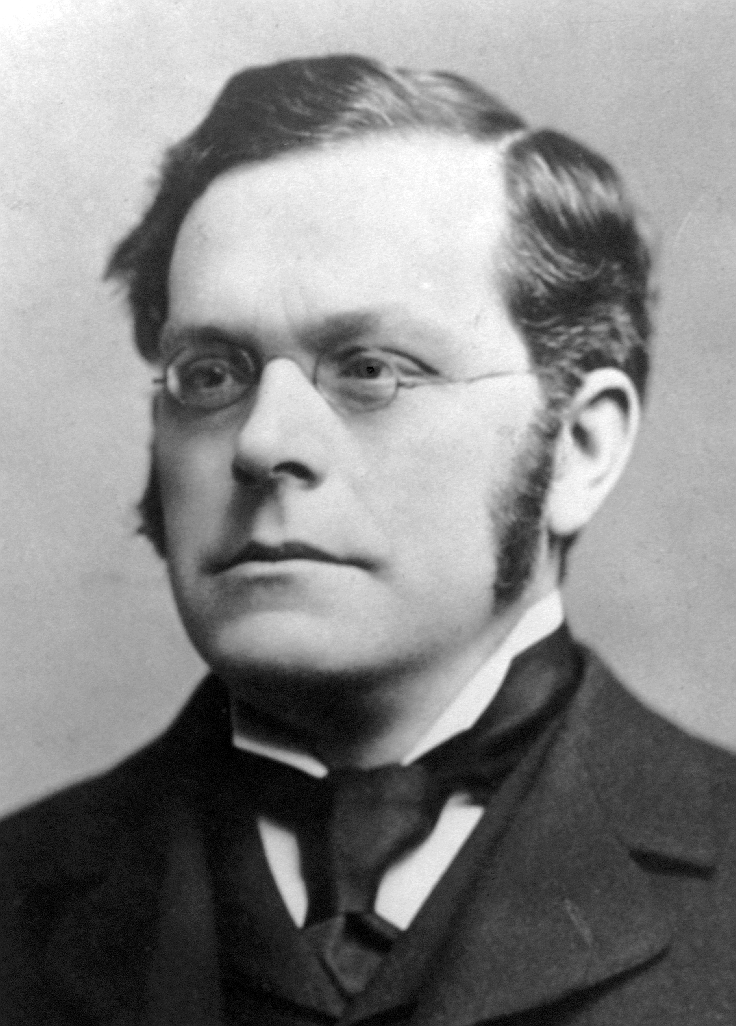
Birrell

General election 1906: Bristol North
Party	Candidate	Votes	%	±%
Liberal	Rt Hon. Augustine Birrell	6,953	63.4	+17.5
Liberal Unionist	John Alderson Foote	4,011	36.6	−17.5
Majority		2,942	26.8	N/A
Turnout		10,964	83.9	+8.9
Registered electors		13,061		
Liberal gain from Liberal Unionist		Swing	+17.5	

=== Elections in the 1910s ===
General election January 1910: Bristol North
Party	Candidate	Votes	%	±%
Liberal	Rt Hon. Augustine Birrell	6,805	55.5	−7.9
Liberal Unionist	Maurice Henry Woods	5,459	44.5	+7.9
Majority		1,346	11.0	−15.8
Turnout		12,264	87.7	+3.8
Liberal hold		Swing	-7.9	

General election December 1910: Bristol North
Party	Candidate	Votes	%	±%
Liberal	Rt Hon. Augustine Birrell	6,410	55.8	+0.3
Conservative	Laurie Magnus	5,084	44.2	−0.3
Majority		1,326	11.6	+0.6
Turnout		11,494	82.2	−5.5
Registered electors				
Liberal hold		Swing	+0.3	

General Election 1914–15:

Another General Election was required to take place before the end of 1915. The political parties had been making preparations for an election to take place and by July 1914, the following candidates had been selected;

- Liberal: Rt Hon. Augustine Birrell
- Unionist: Laurie Magnus

General election 1918: Bristol North
Party		Candidate	Votes	%
C	Coalition Liberal	Stanley Gange	11,400	60.2
	Labour	James Kaylor	5,007	26.5
	National	Ernest Petter	2,520	13.3
Majority			6,393	33.7
Turnout			18,927	54.6
Registered electors			34,657	
	National Liberal win (new boundaries)			
C indicates candidate endorsed by the coalition government.

=== Elections in the 1920s ===
General election 1922: Bristol North
Party	Candidate	Votes	%	±%
National Liberal	Henry Guest	17,495	64.6	+4.4
Labour	Walter Ayles	9,567	35.4	+8.9
Majority		7,928	29.2	N/A
Turnout		27,062	73.2	+18.5
Registered electors		36,985		
National Liberal hold		Swing	–	

General election 1923: Bristol North
Party	Candidate	Votes	%	±%
Labour	Walter Ayles	10,432	37.5	+2.1
Liberal	Henry Guest	8,770	31.5	−33.1
Unionist	Ernest Petter	8,643	31.0	New
Majority		1,663	6.0	N/A
Turnout		27,845	74.4	+1.2
Registered electors		37,424		
Labour gain from National Liberal		Swing	+17.6	

General election 1924: Bristol North
Party	Candidate	Votes	%	±%
Liberal (Conservative)	Freddie Guest (Note: Guest's campaign was run by a joint committee with the local Conservatives)	17,799	59.1	+27.6
Labour	Walter Ayles	12,319	40.9	+3.4
Majority		5,480	18.2	N/A
Turnout		30,118	79.6	+5.2
Registered electors		37,821		
Liberal gain from Labour		Swing	+12.1	

General election 1929: Bristol North
Party	Candidate	Votes	%	±%
Labour	Walter Ayles	18,619	48.7	+7.8
Independent Liberal	Freddie Guest	12,932	33.8	New
Liberal	John Osborne Marshall Skelton	6,713	17.5	−41.6
Majority		5,687	14.9	N/A
Turnout		38,264	78.1	−1.5
Registered electors		49,014		
Labour gain from Liberal		Swing		

=== Elections in the 1930s ===
General election 1931: Bristol North
Party	Candidate	Votes	%	±%
Liberal	Robert Bernays	27,040	66.2	+48.7
Labour	Walter Ayles	13,826	33.8	−14.9
Majority		13,214	32.4	N/A
Turnout		40,866	80.9	+2.8
Liberal gain from Labour		Swing	+31.8	

General election 1935: Bristol North
Party	Candidate	Votes	%	±%
Liberal	Robert Bernays	20,977	56.5	−9.7
Labour	Walter Ayles	16,149	43.5	+9.7
Majority		4,828	13.0	−19.4
Turnout		37,126	73.2	−7.7
Liberal hold		Swing	-9.7	

=== Elections in the 1940s ===
General election 1945: Bristol North
Party	Candidate	Votes	%	±%
Labour Co-op	William Coldrick	22,819	57.8	+14.3
National Liberal	John Britton	16,648	42.2	−14.3
Majority		6,171	15.6	N/A
Turnout		39,467	74.0	+1.8
Labour Co-op gain from Liberal				
