= List of University of Birmingham alumni =

This is a list of notable alumni related to the University of Birmingham and its predecessors, Mason Science College and Queen's College, Birmingham. Excluded from this list are those people whose only connection with Birmingham University is that they were awarded an honorary degree.

== Nobel Prize recipients ==
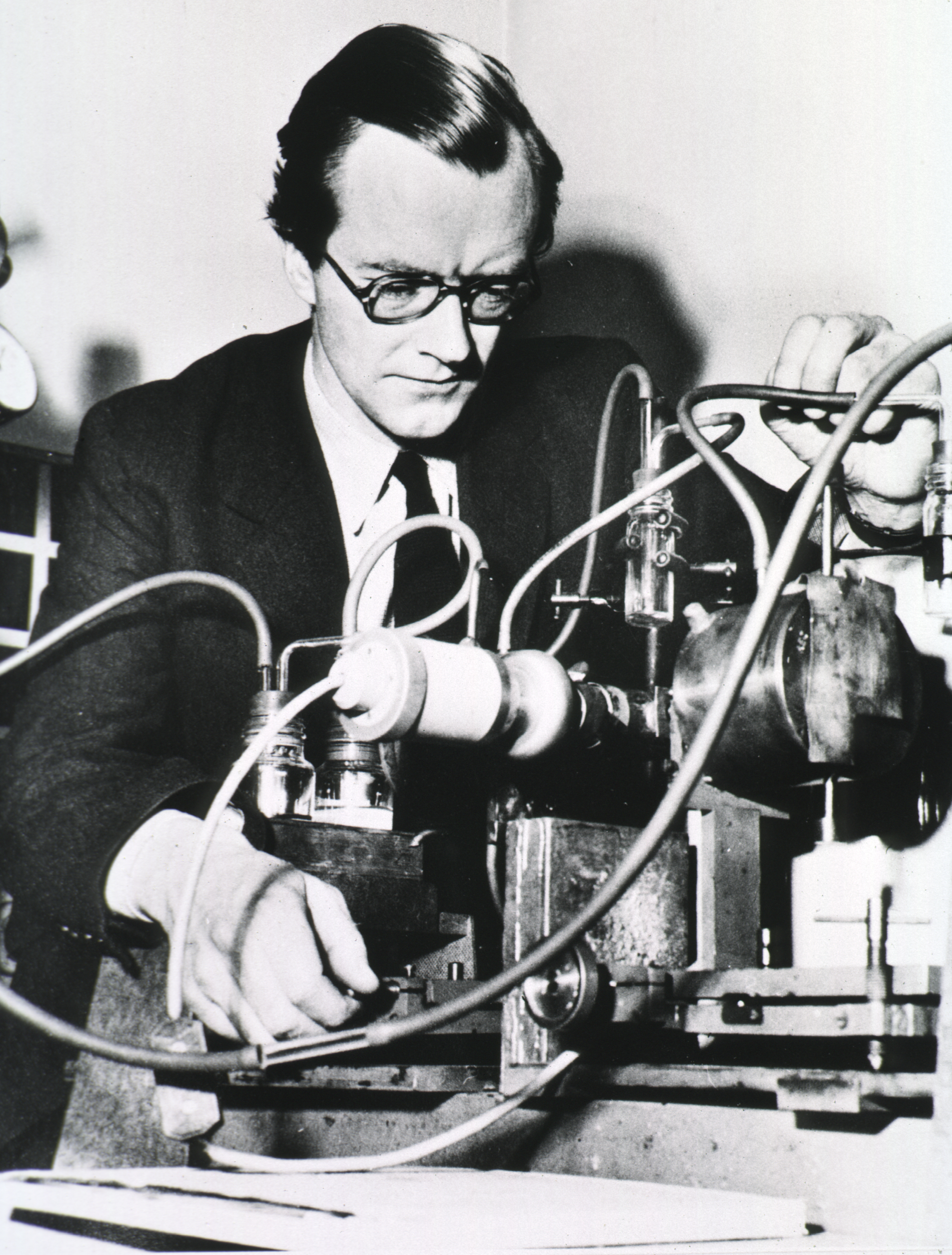
Maurice Wilkins

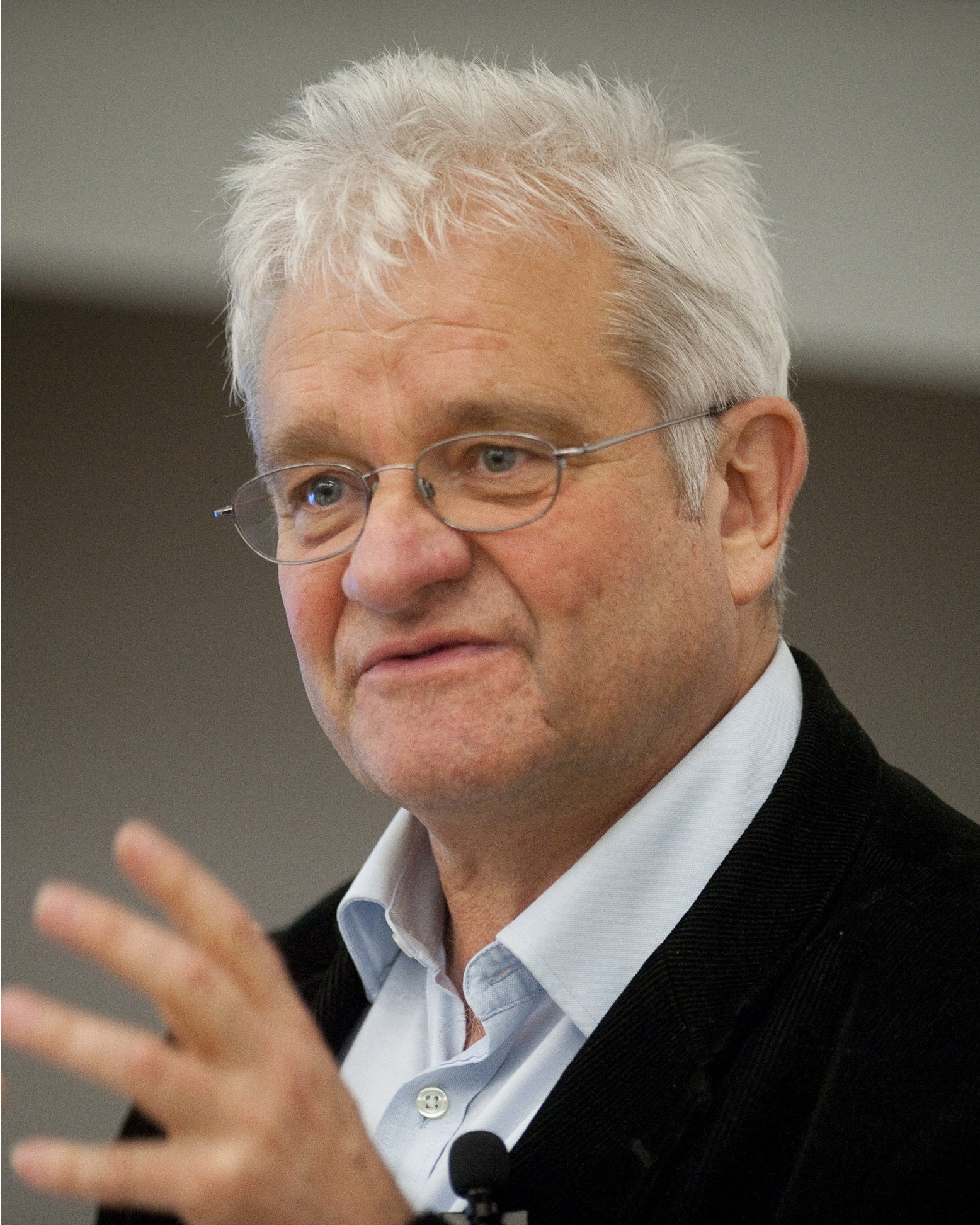
Sir Paul Nurse

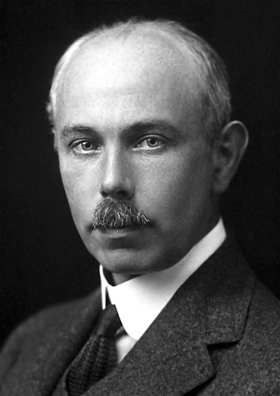
Francis William Aston

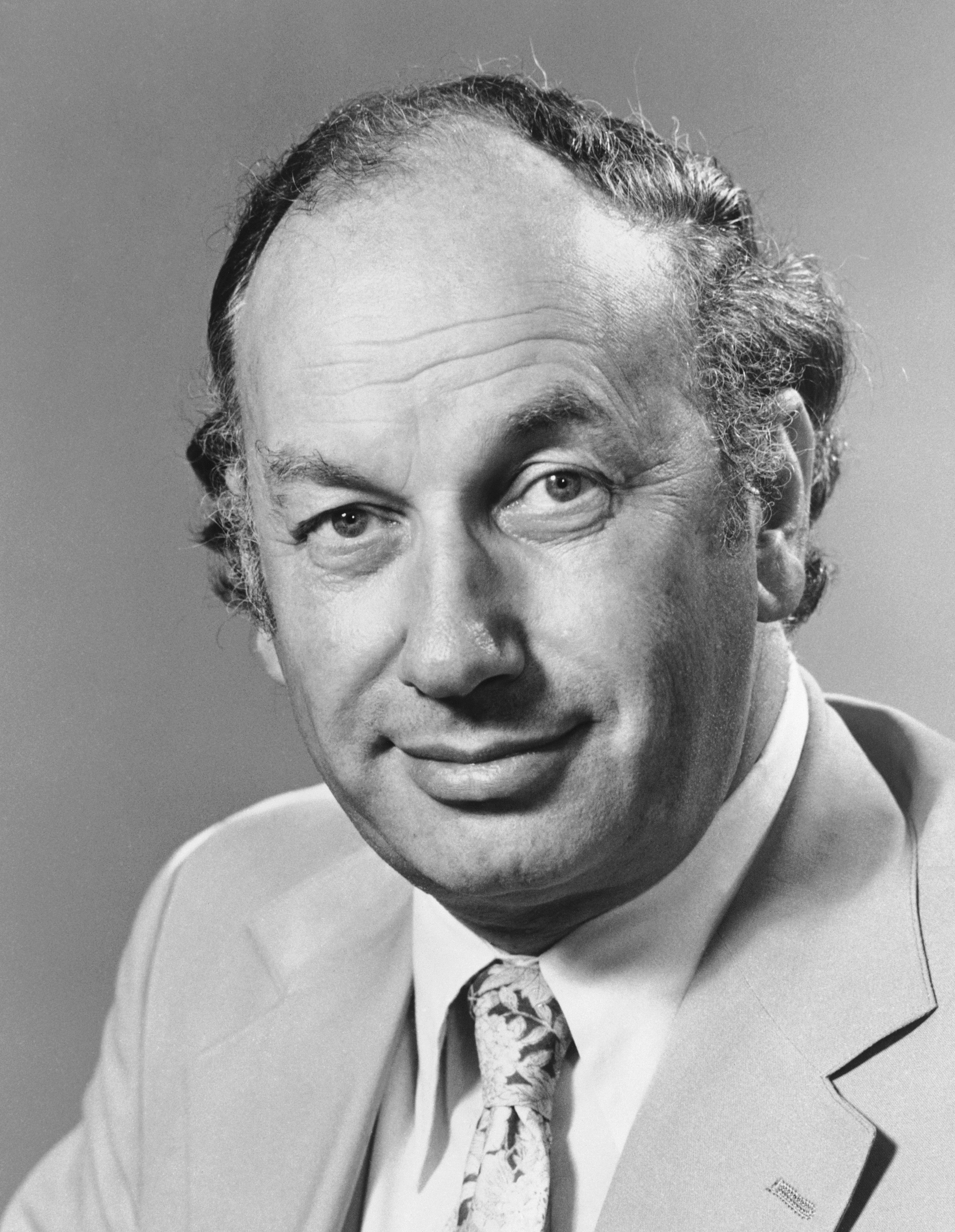
Sir John Vane

| Name | Year | Prize | Affiliation | Reference |
|---|---|---|---|---|
| Francis William Aston | 1922 | Nobel Prize in Chemistry | BSc in Applied/Pure Science, 1910; DSc in Applied/Pure Science, 1914 (also a lecturer at the university) | |
| Maurice Wilkins | 1962 | Nobel Prize in Physiology or Medicine | PhD in Physics, 1940 | |
| Sir John Vane | 1982 | Nobel Prize in Physiology or Medicine | BSc in Chemistry, 1947 | |
| Sir Paul Nurse | 2001 | Nobel Prize in Physiology or Medicine | BSc in Biology, 1970 | |

In addition, soil scientist Peter Bullock (1958 BA Geography) contributed to the reports of the IPCC, which was awarded the Nobel Peace Prize in 2007

== Academics ==
=== Agriculture ===
- Chris Pollock, Chief Scientific Adviser to the Welsh Assembly Government 2007-08
- Christopher Wathes, Chairman of the Farm Animal Welfare Council, awarded the Research Medal of the Royal Agricultural Society of England (BSc in Physics, 1974)

=== Biology ===
- Sir Gabriel Horn, biologist and Emeritus Professor in Zoology at the University of Cambridge
- John Belling, cytogeneticist
- Arthur Henry Reginald Buller, British-Canadian mycologist (BSc in 1896)
- Derek Burke, Professor of Biological Sciences, Vice-Chancellor of the University of East Anglia
- Keith Chater, microbiologist
- Barry Everitt, Master of Downing College, Professor of Behavioural Neuroscience and Director of Research, and Provost of the Gates Cambridge Trust at Cambridge University
- Fawzia Fahim, Egyptian biochemist and environmental biologist
- Amanda Fisher, cell biologist and professor at Imperial College London (BSc in Biological Science, 1983)
- Robert Thomson Leiper, parasitologist and helminthologist
- Tony Minson, virologist (BSc in 1965)
- Sir Kenneth Murray, molecular biologist (PhD in Microbiology)
- Lady Noreen Murray, molecular geneticist who helped develop a vaccine against hepatitis B
- Sir Michael Owen, neurologist
- Julian Parkhill, Head of Pathogen Genomics at the Wellcome Trust Sanger Institute (BSc in Biological Sciences, postdoctoral research)
- Sheena Radford, Astbury Professor of Biophysics at the University of Leeds (BSc in Biochemistry, 1984)
- Stanley Salmons, Research Fellowship in the Department of Anatomy and Stothert Research Fellowship of the Royal Society
- Nicola Spence, Chief Plant Health Officer of the Department for Environment, Food and Rural Affairs
- Swale Vincent, physiologist
- Michael J O Wakelam, molecular biologist, director of the Babraham Institute
- Rosemary Waring, toxicologist
- Patrick Webb, Professor of Nutrition at the Friedman School of Nutrition Science and Policy at Tufts University
- Sean Whelan (scientist), Professor of Microbiology at Harvard Medical School

=== Chemistry ===
- Alexander Markham, pioneer in genetic medicine
- Dario Alessi, biochemist (BSc in Biochemistry, 1988)
- Sir Simon Campbell, President of the Royal Society of Chemistry (2004–06)
- James Feast, chemist, President of the Royal Society of Chemistry (2006–08), recipient of the 2007 Royal Medal (PhD in 1963)
- Roger S. Goody, Biochemist, Director Emeritus, Max Planck Institute of Molecular Physiology, Dortmund, Germany
- Arthur Lapworth, chemist
- Eloisa Biasotto Mano (1924–2019), Brazilian chemist, professor, specialist in polymers
- Phil Mason, chemist
- Ajith C. S. Perera, Chartered Chemist / Analytical Chemistry and Quality Assurance, Test-Match Panel Senior Cricket Umpire turned by adversity in 1992 November Accessibility Rights Activist, Speaker, Writer, Author & Publisher.
- Arthur Peacocke, lecturer in chemistry and biophysical chemistry (1948–1959)
- David Phillips, President of the Royal Society of Chemistry (2010–12)
- Sir Robert Howson Pickard, chemist who did pioneering work in stereochemistry, Principal of Battersea Polytechnic 1920–27, Vice Chancellor of the University of London 1937-1939
- David Richardson, biochemist, Vice-Chancellor of the University of East Anglia
- Maurice Stacey, Professor of Chemistry, worked alongside Sir Norman Haworth to artificially synthesize Vitamin C, awarded the 1933 Meldola Medal of the Royal Society of Chemistry (BSc, PhD, DSc)
- Sir John Robert Vane, pharmacologist who was instrumental in the understanding of how aspirin produces pain-relief. Nobel laureate.
- Thomas Summers West, chemist, President of the Society for Analytical Chemistry (PhD in Chemistry, 1952; later a lecturer at the university)

=== Computer science, mathematics and statistics ===
- Julian Besag, statistician, recipient of the Guy Medal in Silver (1983) (BSc in 1968)
- Mike Cowlishaw, computer scientist
- Peter McCullagh, statistician, recipient of the Guy Medal in Bronze (1983) and in Silver (2005), and the inaugural Karl Pearson Prize
- Mary Lee Woods, mathematician and computer programmer
- Mike Worboys, mathematician and computer scientist

=== Cultural studies ===
- Paul Gilroy, sociologist and cultural theorist
- Stuart Hall, cultural theorist
- Lawrence Grossberg, cultural studies theorist
- Paul Willis, sociologist and cultural theorist
- Angela McRobbie, media studies scholar and cultural theorist

=== Economics ===
- David Bailey, economist
- Michael Beesley, industrial economist
- David Blanchflower, labour economist
- Julian Cooper, specialist in Russian economic matters (PhD)
- Milton Ezrati, economist
- Homa Katouzian, economist, historian, political scientist and literary critic, with a special interest in Iranian studies
- Charit Tingsabadh, Thai economist
- Alan Williams, health economist

=== Education ===
- John Omoniyi Abiri, Nigerian academic, dean of the Faculty of Education University of Ilorin
- Mel Ainscow, Professor of Education at the University of Manchester
- William Arbuckle Reid, British curriculum theorist
- Leaena Tambyah, social worker and founder of the first school for children with multiple disabilities in Singapore

=== Engineering ===
- Sir Philip Baxter, chemical engineer, Vice-Chancellor of the University of New South Wales
- Tim Broyd, civil engineer and 152nd President of Institution of Civil Engineers, 2016–2017.
- John Campbell, casting scientist
- John Fisher, leading biomedical engineer
- Ray Lightwood, medical engineer at Queen Elizabeth Hospital Birmingham, with Leon Abrams developed and implanted the first variable rate pacemaker (Official degree of BSc in 1974)
- Lionel Simeon Marks, engineer and one of the pioneers of aeronautics, Professor of Mechanical Engineering at Harvard University from 1894 to 1940
- Sir Louis Matheson, British engineer, served as the first Vice-Chancellor of Monash University
- Wahid Omar, Professor in Structural Engineering and the sixth Vice Chancellor of Universiti Teknologi Malaysia
- Marco Rito-Palomares, Professor of Bioprocess Engineering at the Centre for Biotechnology at Tecnológico de Monterrey
- P. B. Sharma, mechanical engineer, Vice Chancellor of Delhi Technological University
- Bridget Shield, awarded the R W B Stephens Medal by the Institute of Acoustics in 2011
- Noky Simbani, model, studied chemical engineering and graduated in 2020

=== English ===
- Polly Ho-Yen, author
- David Lodge, novelist and literary critic (PhD English, 1967; Professor of English)
- Lorna Sage, English academic, author and literary critic
- F. P. Wilson, literary scholar and bibliographer

=== Geography ===
- John Brian Harley, geographer and map historian
- Geoffrey J.D. Hewings, geographer
- Phil Hubbard, Professor of Urban Studies, King's College London
- Keith Lilley, Professor of Geography Queen's University Belfast
- Terry Slater, Reader in Historical Geography
- Michael John Wise, Emeritus Professor of Geography, University of London

=== Geology ===
- Rob Larter, Marine Geolophysicist, British Antarctic Survey, awarded the Polar Medal (PhD Geological Sciences, 1991)
- Li Siguang, father of geomechanics in China
- Frank H. T. Rhodes, geologist, President of Cornell University from 1977 to 1995
- Ethel Shakespear, geologist (DSc 1906)
- Gordon Warwick, geomorphologist and speleologist
- Harry B. Whittington, palaeontologist who made a major contribution to the study of fossils of the Burgess Shale and other Cambrian fauna
- Leonard Johnston Wills, British geologist, recipient of the Wollaston Medal of the Geological Society of London in 1954

=== History ===
- M. K. Ashby, educationalist, writer and historian
- Halil Berktay, Turkish historian
- Sydney Checkland, British-Canadian economic historian (BComm and MComm)
- Carl Chinn, historian, writer, radio presenter, magazine editor, newspaper columnist, media personality
- Reginald Horsman, historian
- Catherine Merridale, historian
- Duncan Probert (1961-2016), historian
- Ian Morris, American historian, currently Willard Professor of Classics at Stanford University
- Margaret Mullett, Professor of Byzantine studies and director of the Institute of Byzantine Studies at the Queen's University of Belfast
- Berrick Saul, Vice-Chancellor of the University of York, economic historian
- George E. Taylor, historian
- Charlotte Zeepvat, royal historian

=== Humanities, management and social sciences ===
- Akbar S. Ahmed, anthropologist; Ibn Khaldun Chair of Islamic Studies, American University, Washington, DC
- Shahram Akbarzadeh, professor of International Relations, East European Studies and Middle Eastern Studies at the University of Melbourne
- Paul Crawford, academic, author and broadcaster; professor of Health Humanities at the University of Nottingham
- John Ellis, media academic
- Sir John Hills, professor of Social Policy at the London School of Economics; director of the ESRC Research Centre for the Analysis of Social Exclusion
- Stephen Hinton, Avalon Foundation Professor in the Humanities at Stanford University
- Alan Kennedy, Professor of Psychology from 1972–2006 at the University of Dundee
- Vincent Watts, management consultant, Vice-Chancellor of the University of East Anglia (1997–2002)
- Ian Wilson, Canadian linguist

=== Medicine and dentistry ===
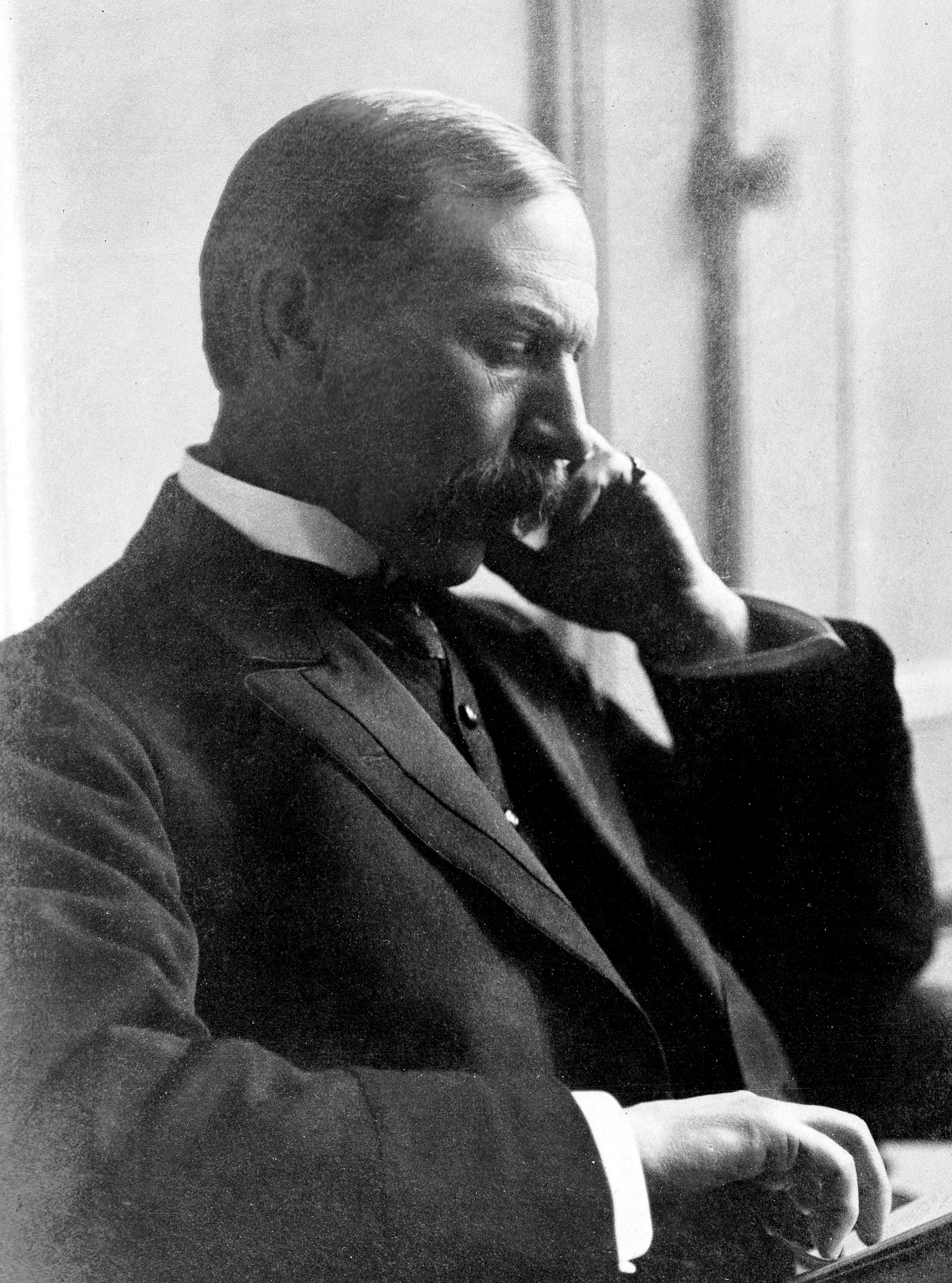
Sir Gilbert Barling

- Leon Abrams, cardiothoracic surgeon, developed and implanted the first variable rate pacemaker in 1960 (MBChB Medicine, 1945)
- Babatunde Kwaku Adadevoh, Nigerian Physician, Vice chancellor of the University of Lagos, Nigeria
- Sir Gilbert Barling, 1st Baronet, physician
- Martin Brown, Emeritus Professor of Radiation Oncology at Stanford University (BSc, Physics, 1963)
- Melanie Calvert, epidemiologist
- Colin Cooper, Professor of Cancer Genetics at the University of East Anglia
- Nick Craddock, professor of psychiatry at Cardiff University
- Sir Charles Frederick George, President British Medical Association (Intercalated BSc in Anatomy 1962, MBChB in Medicine 1965)
- Keith Harding, Head of Wound Healing Research Unit and Director of TIME Institute, Cardiff University (MBChB Medicine, 1976)
- Humphrey Francis Humphreys, Professor of Dental Surgery, Vice-Chancellor of the University of Birmingham 1952-1953
- Carola Garcia de Vinuesa, Head of the Department of Pathogens and Immunity at the College of Medicine at the Australian National University
- Dame Hilda Lloyd, first woman to be elected as president of the Royal College of Obstetricians and Gynaecologists
- Brian MacMahon, epidemiologist
- Sir Alexander Markham, Chief Executive Cancer Research UK from 2003 to 2008
- Edward Marsland, Professor of Oral Surgery at Birmingham University (1979-1982), Vice-Chancellor Birmingham University (1982-1987) (PhD, Faculty of Medicine, 1950)
- Mike McMahon, surgeon
- Sir Leonard Parsons, Professor of Paediatrics; he was the first to use synthetic vitamin C to treat scurvy in children in 1933
- Rahul Potluri, doctor, researcher, scientist and founder of ACALM
- José Narro Robles, Rector of the National Autonomous University of Mexico (postgraduate studies in Community Medicine)
- Sir Arthur Thomson, Dean of the Faculty of Medicine at Birmingham University
- Aaron Valero, physician
- John L. Wallace, medical scientist and inaugural director of the Farncombe Institute at McMaster University
- Peter Weissberg, Medical Director at British Heart Foundation

=== Philosophy ===
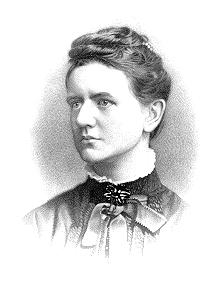
Constance Naden

- John Lewis, philosopher
- Bernard Mayo, English philosopher
- Constance Naden, philosopher and poet

=== Physics ===
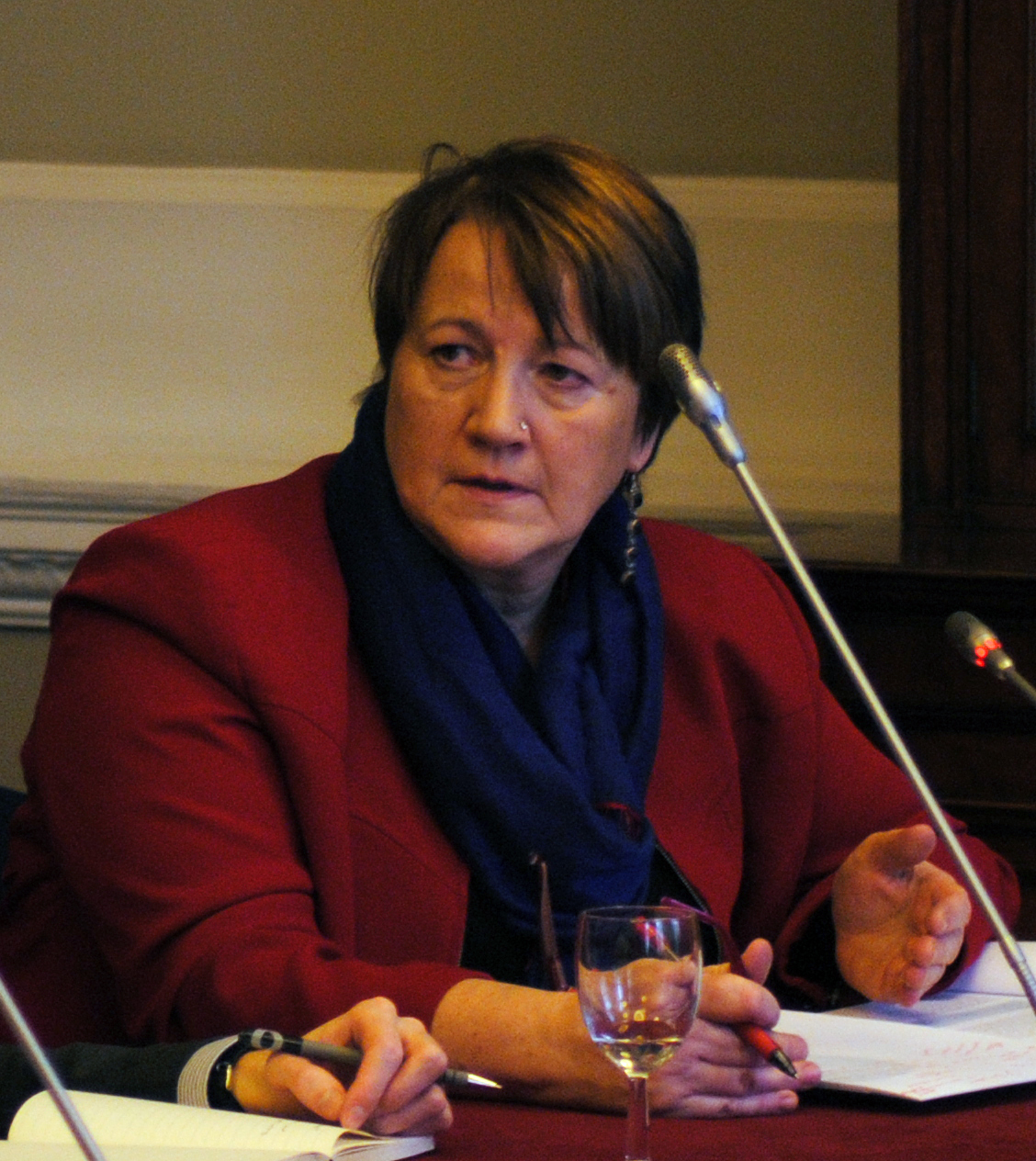
Patricia Lewis

- Aba Andam, Ghanaian particle physicist
- John Stewart Bell, physicist and originator of Bell's theorem (PhD in Physics, 1956)
- Harry Boot, co-developer of the cavity magnetron
- Gerald E. Brown, physicist, recipient of the 2001 Hans Bethe Prize (DSc, 1957)
- Noor Muhammad Butt, Pakistani research physicist
- Helen Caines, nuclear physicist at Yale University
- Sir Alan Cottrell, metallurgist, UK Government Chief Scientific Adviser (BSc in 1939 and PhD in 1942; later a professor)
- John Newton Dodd, physicist, recipient of the 1976 Hector Medal of the Royal Society of New Zealand (PhD in Physics, 1952)
- John Dowell, FRS, Nuclear physicist, Professor of Elementary Particle Physics, Birmingham University (1980–2002)
- Ian Fisher, Professor of Applied Physics and Director Geballe Laboratory for Advanced Materials, Stanford University (BSc, School of Physics and Space Research, 1989–92)
- Brian Flowers, Baron Flowers, British physicist
- Richard Harrison, Head of Space Physics Division and Chief Scientist at the Rutherford Appleton Laboratory
- Frank Horton, Professor of Physics at Royal Holloway College and Vice-Chancellor of the University of London 1939-45
- David Hughes, astronomer and astrophysicist
- George Isaak, physicist and an important figure in the development of helio- and asteroseismology, recipient of the 1993 Hughes Medal
- Eric Jakeman, mathematical physicist, recipient of the Maxwell Medal and a Fellow of the Royal Society
- James S. Langer, Professor of Physics at the University of California, Santa Barbara, recipient of the 1997 Oliver E. Buckley Condensed Matter Prize (PhD in 1958)
- Patricia Lewis, physicist (PhD in Nuclear Structure Physics)
- Elliott H. Lieb, American mathematical physicist at Princeton University, recipient of the 1978 Dannie Heineman Prize for Mathematical Physics (PhD in Physics, 1956)
- Stanley Mandelstam, physicist at the University of California, Berkeley, recipient of the 1991 Dirac Medal of the ICTP (PhD in Mathematical Physics, 1956)
- Jacob Noel-Storr – astrophysicist (MSci (Hons) Physics with Astrophysics, 1998)
- Edwin Ernest Salpeter, astrophysicist, recipient of the 1997 Crafoord Prize in Astronomy (PhD in Physics, 1948)
- Cyril Stanley Smith, metallurgist and science historian, worked on the Manhattan Project, Institute Professor at MIT (BSc)
- F. J. M. Stratton, Professor of Astrophysics at the University of Cambridge
- Sir Ernest Titterton, nuclear physicist involved in the development of the atomic bomb (BSc in 1936, MSc in 1938 and PhD in 1941)
- Sir Arthur Vick, Vice-Chancellor Queen's University Belfast 1966–76, Director of the Atomic Energy Research Establishment 1960-64 (PhD, physics)
- Alan Howard Ward, nuclear physicist (PhD, physics)
- Raymond Wilson, physicist, recipient of the 2010 Kavli Prize in Astrophysics

=== Political science ===
- Stephen Gill, political scientist
- Philip Gummett, chief executive at the Higher Education Funding Council for Wales, pro vice-chancellor, director of the PREST institute, and professor of government and technology policy at Manchester University (BSc Chemistry, 1969)
- Richard Sakwa, Russian and European political scientist

=== Theology ===
- Robert Beckford, theologian and film-maker (PhD and later a research fellow)
- William Lane Craig, philosopher and Christian apologist
- Gavin D'Costa, Professor of Theology at the University of Bristol
- Lynn de Silva, Sri Lankan theologian, former director of the Ecumenical Institute for Study and Dialogue, Methodist minister
- James Haire, Director of the Public and Contextual Theology Research Centre at Charles Sturt University in Canberra
- James Holt, Mormon scholar
- John M. Hull, Emeritus Professor of Religious Education at the University of Birmingham
- J. Spencer Trimingham, Islam scholar

=== Zoology ===
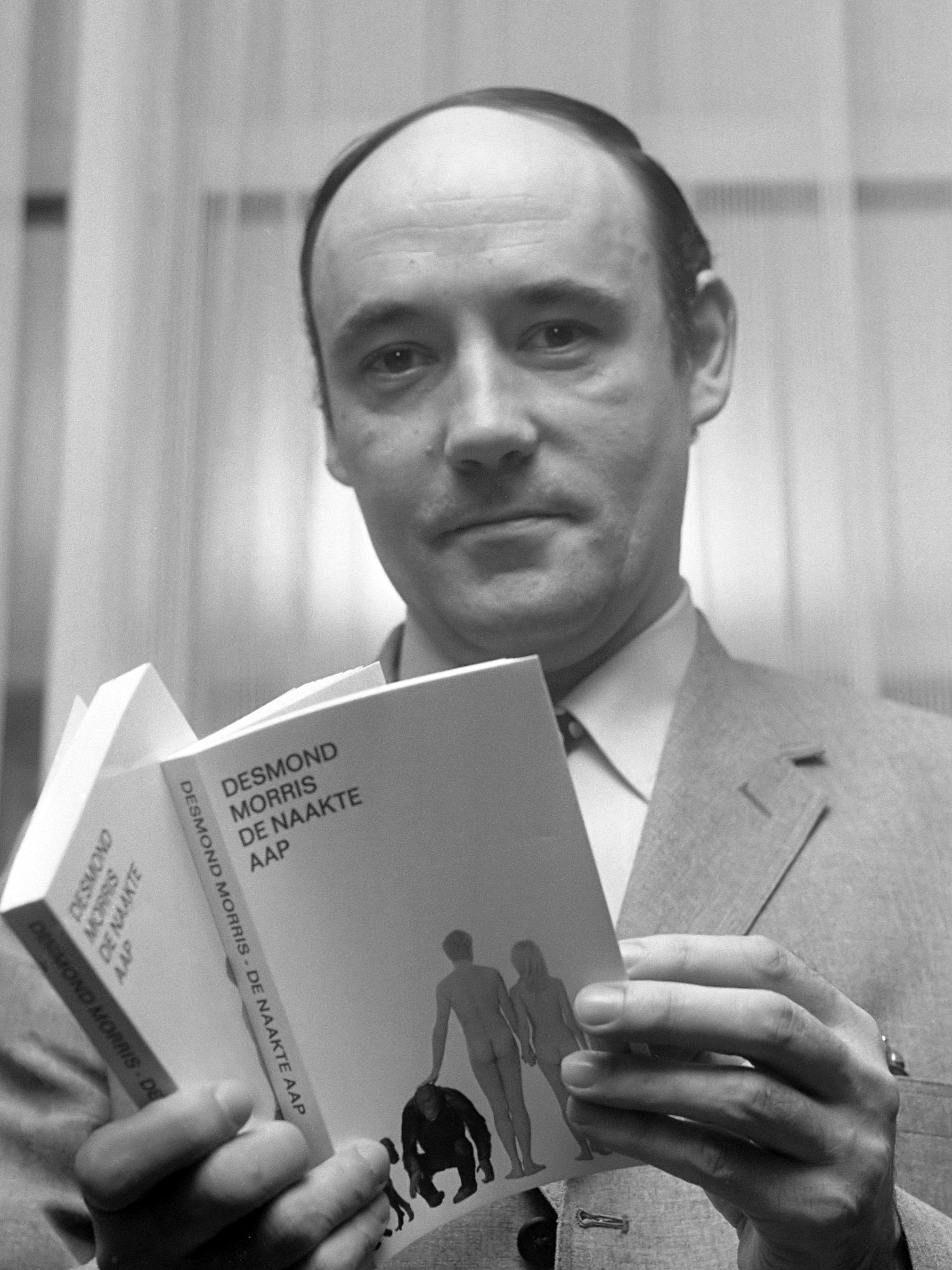
Desmond Morris

- Minnie Abercrombie, zoologist
- Leslie Brent, immunologist and zoologist
- Desmond Morris, zoologist, author and TV presenter
- Karl Shuker, zoologist and cryptozoologist

== Actors, comedians and directors ==
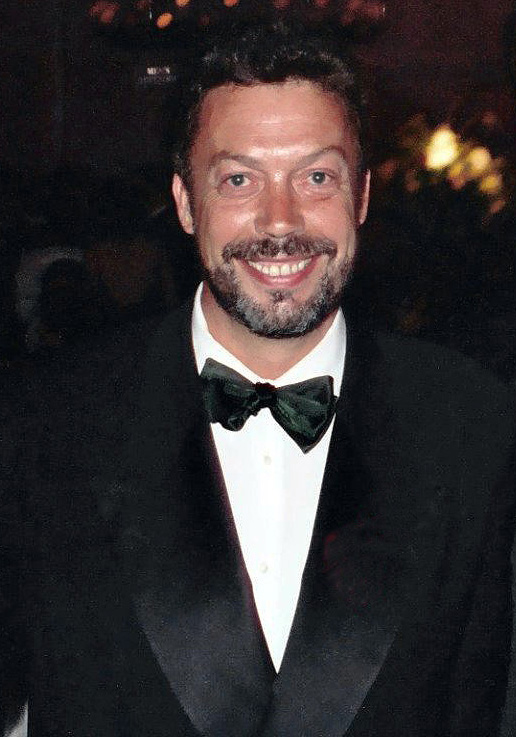
Tim Curry

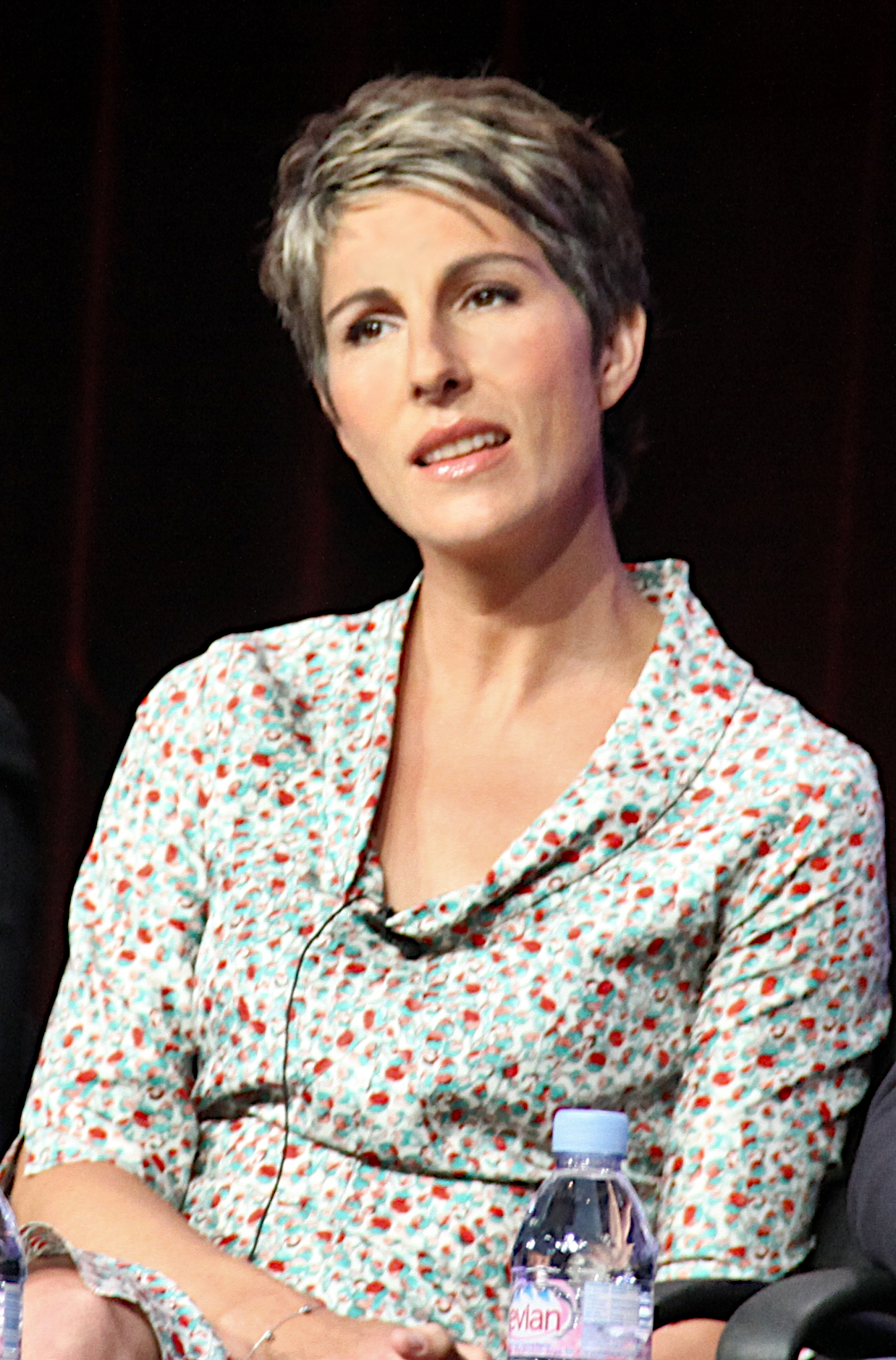
Tamsin Greig

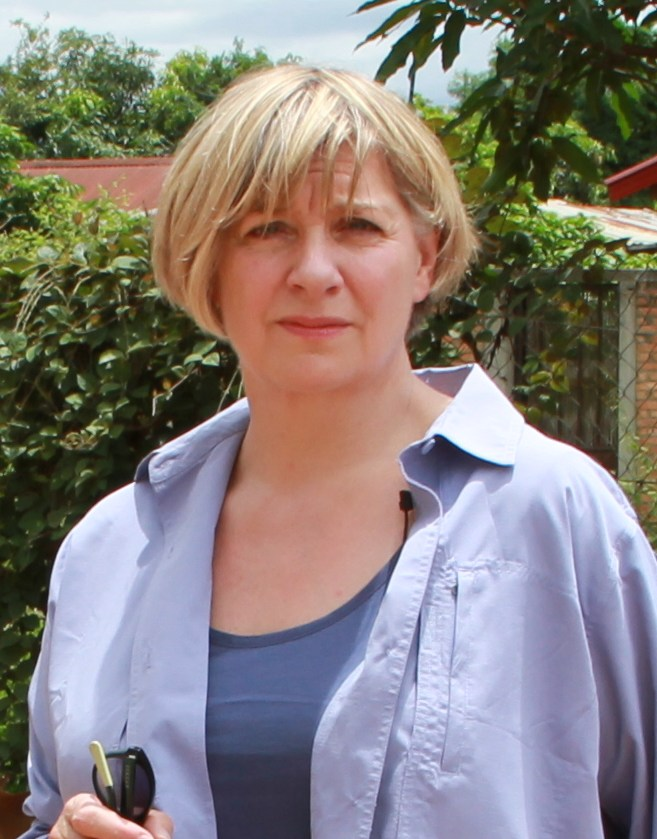
Victoria Wood

- Chris Addison, comedian, writer and actor
- Suzy Aitchison, television actress
- Jean Butler, dancer and choreographer, known for Riverdance
- Fiona Button, actress
- Madeleine Carroll, actress
- Frank Clewlow, actor-director, Federal Controller of Productions for the Australian Broadcasting Corporation
- Fielder Cook, Emmy Award-winning director and producer
- Elliot Cowan, actor
- Tim Curry, actor and musician
- Hadley Fraser, stage and theatre actor
- Mariah Gale, actress
- Matthew Goode, actor
- Tamsin Greig, actress
- Isaac Hampstead-Wright, actor
- Elizabeth Henstridge, actress
- Jonathan Holmes, theatre director
- Nana Kagga - Actress, producer and director
- Jude Kelly, theatre director
- Nigel Lindsay, stage and screen actor
- Lou Llobell, actress
- Phyllida Lloyd, director
- Judy Loe, actress
- Wanda Opalinska, actress, Underworld factory worker Wiki Dankowska in Coronation Street
- Norman Painting, actor
- Tim Plester, playwright and actor
- Consuelo De Reyes, theatre director and dramatist
- Tom Riley, actor
- George Robinson, actor
- Jim Field Smith, actor, writer and director
- Andy Wilson, film, TV and theatre director
- Victoria Wood, comedian and actress
- Jane Wymark, actress, studied drama and theatre arts

== Armed forces ==
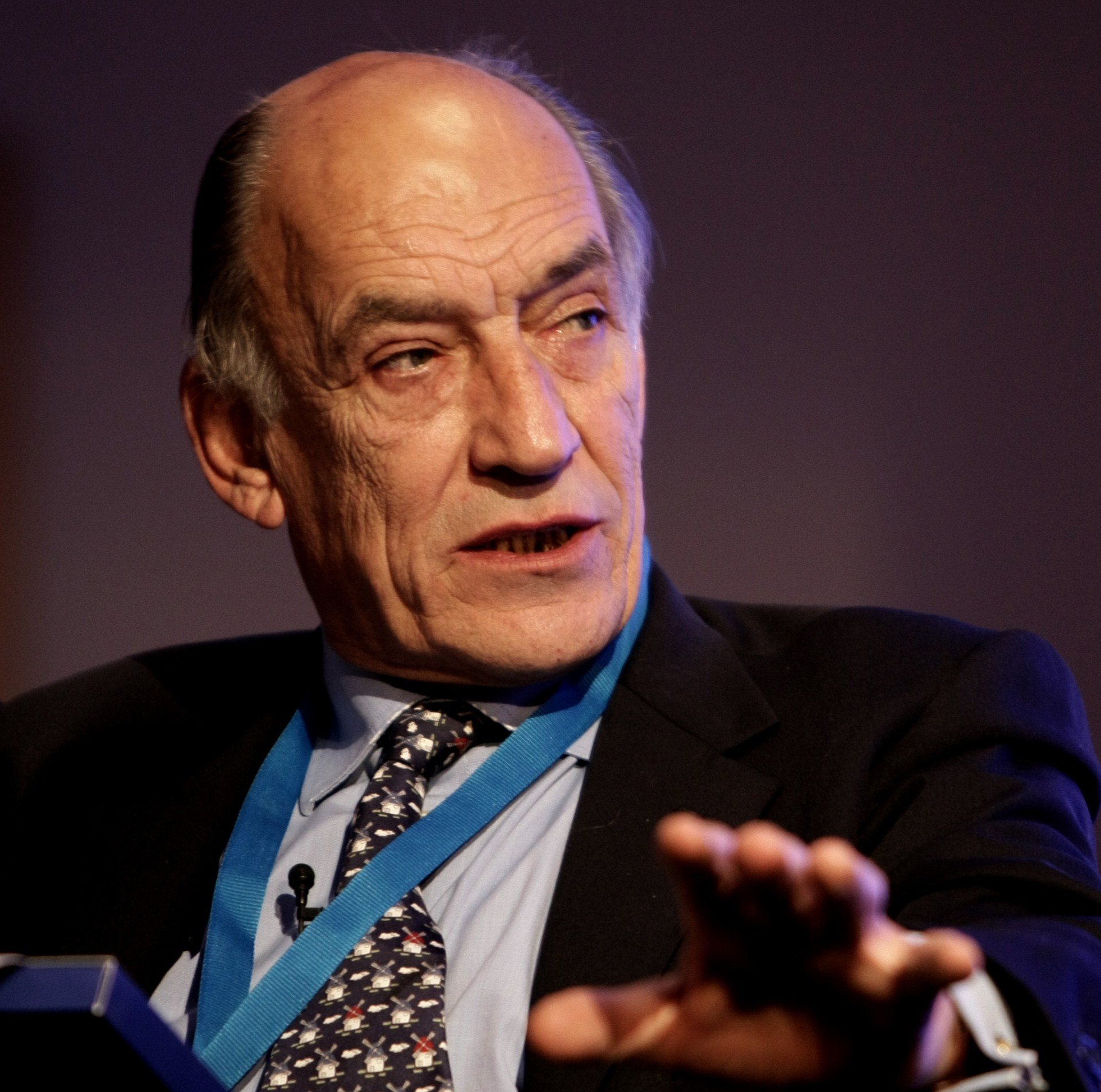
General Sir Mike Jackson

- Peter Gray, Air Commodore (ret’d) and military historian
- Alan Hawley, Major General, Director General of the Army Medical Services 2006-09
- Sir Mike Jackson, former Chief of the General Staff, the most senior officer in the British Army
- Adrian Nance, Commodore of Royal Navy Maritime Warfare School based in HMS Collingwood, commanding officer of HMS Ark Royal
- David Tinker, Royal Navy supply officer, killed in action, shortly before the end of the Falklands War, when HMS Glamorgan was hit by an Exocet missile

== Authors and writers ==
- Walter Allen, novelist and literary critic
- U. R. Ananthamurthy, Indian writer, recipient of the 1998 Padma Bhushan (PhD in English, 1966)
- John Ash, poet, fiction and travel writer
- Sefi Atta, prize-winning Nigerian author and playwright
- Nasser Azam, contemporary artist
- Sam Baker, former editor-in-chief of Cosmopolitan
- Dominic Barker, children's author
- Pat Barr, novelist
- Alan Booth, travel writer
- John Briley, screenwriter, won the Academy Award For Best Original Screenplay at the 1982 Oscars for Gandhi
- Matt Bullen, writer and screenwriter
- Jane E. Clarke, writer of children's books and poetry
- James Clavell, novelist and screenwriter
- Narinder Dhami, children's author
- Roy Fisher, poet
- William Garner, novelist
- Fawzia Gilani-Williams author of children's books and poetry
- Patricia Hall, novelist
- Stewart Harcourt, screenwriter
- Sarah Kane, playwright
- Philip Kerr, Scottish author
- Razia Khan, Bangladeshi author
- Stephen Lowe, playwright
- William P. McGivern, crime novelist and scriptwriter
- Samar Samir Mezghanni, children's author
- Fawzia Gilani-Williams, children's author and scholar
- Rosalind Miles, author
- Caroline Moir, author
- Clare Morrall, novelist
- Olly Moss, graphic designer and illustrator
- Steve Nallon, novelist and short story writer
- Charles Talbut Onions, English grammarian and lexicographer, the fourth editor of the Oxford English Dictionary
- Kineton Parkes, novelist and art historian
- Tasmina Perry, British novelist and editor
- Henry Reed, Poet, translator, radio dramatist and journalist
- James Riordan, novelist
- C. J. Sansom, crime novelist
- Florence Schechter, author and founder of Vagina Museum
- Henry Treece, poet and novelist
- S. J. Watson, writer
- William Purcell Witcutt, folklorist and author
- Francis Brett Young, novelist, poet, playwright, and composer
- Shahidul Zahir, Bangladeshi post-modernist author

== Business and entrepreneurship ==
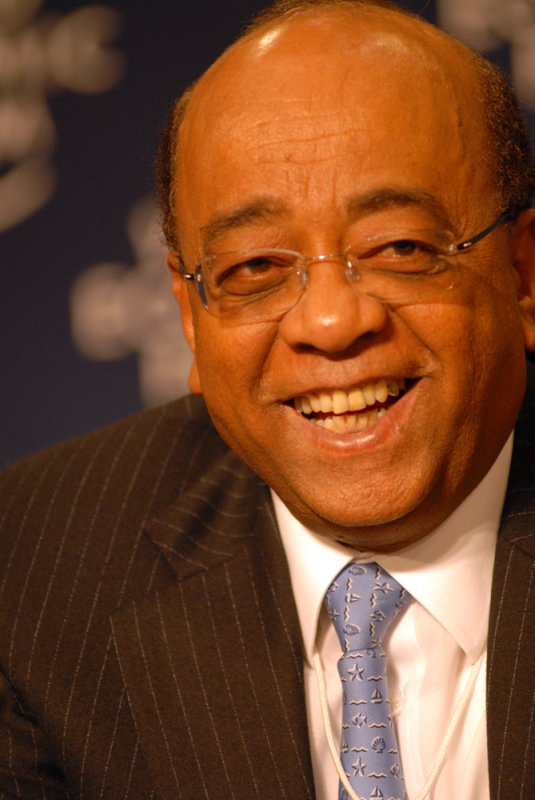
Mo Ibrahim

- Chris Banks, Managing Director of Coca-Cola Great Britain
- Mike Coupe, CEO of Sainsbury's
- George Davis, fashion designer and retailer, founded Next, George at Asda and Per Una
- Mark Edwards, CEO of Mformation
- Mo Ibrahim, Sudanese-British mobile communications entrepreneur, founder of the Mo Ibrahim Foundation (PhD and later research fellow)
- Sir Alex Jarratt, Chairman and CEO of Reed International Limited, Chairman of Smiths Industries (BComm)
- Sir John Jennings, Chairman of the Shell Transport and Trading Company plc 1993-97
- Gerald Rusgrove Mills, publisher who established the publishing company Mills & Boon
- Phil O'Donovan - Bluetooth engineer & CSR plc co-founder
- Adam Osborne, founder of the Osborne Computer Corporation
- Keith Palmer, leader in public and private partnerships in international development (BSc Geology, 1968; PhD, 1971)
- Sir Ian Prosser, British businessman
- Jim Ratcliffe, founder and chief executive officer of the Ineos chemicals group
- Jim Reid-Anderson, Chairman, President and CEO of Six Flags
- Amanda Ross, Joint Managing Director of Cactus TV
- Michael Acton Smith, CEO, Creative Director and founder of online games developer and entertainment company Mind Candy
- Cilla Snowball, Group Chairman and Group Chief Executive of AMV BBDO
- M.V. Subbiah, former executive chairman of the Murugappa Group, Chairman National Skill Development Corporation (NSDC) of India
- Sir Clive Thompson, former President of the Confederation of British Industry
- Sir George Turnbull, UK automobile executive
- Mary Turner, CEO of Koovs
- Xu Xinliu (as Singloh Hsu), banker
- Sir Peter Walters, CEO and chairman of BP
- Sir Hossein Yassaie, Chief Executive of Imagination Technologies (BSc 1979; PhD, 1983)

== Charities and NGOs ==
- H. J. Blackham, first president and co-founder of the British Humanist Association
- Ian Bruce, academic, vice-president of the Royal National Institute of Blind People, founder and president of the Centre for Charity Effectiveness at Cass Business School
- Glanis Changachirere, women's rights activist and founder of the Institute for Young Women Development
- Hany El-Banna, founder of Islamic Relief
- Monica Fletcher, Chief Executive of Education for Health (MSc Healthcare Policy and Management, 1997)
- George Hosking, founder of the WAVE Trust
- Sebastian Rocca, social entrepreneur, coach, and LGBTQI rights activist
- Jane Slowey, Chief Executive of The Foyer Federation
- Sir Nick Young, Chief Executive of the British Red Cross, Chief Executive of Macmillan Cancer Relief (1995-2001)

== Engineers ==
- Sir Stanley Brown, chairman of the CEGB
- John Campbell, casting scientist
- Sir Henry Fowler, locomotive engineer, Director of Production Ministry of Munitions 1915–17
- Winifred Hackett, aeronautical engineer and former president of the Women's Engineering Society, the first woman to graduate from the University of Birmingham with a degree in engineering.
- Robert Haslam, British industrialist and chairman of British Steel Corporation and British Coal.
- Nana Kagga, Petroleum (Chemical) engineer at Tullow Oil in Uganda.
- Lord Marshall of Goring, Chairman of the United Kingdom Atomic Energy Authority, chairman of the Central Electricity Generating Board.
- Sir Francis McLean, Chief Engineer of the Psychological Warfare Division of the Supreme Headquarters, Allied Expeditionary Force (PWD Shaef) in World War II, Director of Engineering at the BBC from 1963–68
- Sir Terry Morgan, Chairman of Crossrail, Chief Executive of Tube Lines (MSc Engineering Production, 1978)
- Sir Austin Pearce, former Chairman of British Aerospace
- Harvey Postlethwaite, engineer and Technical Director of several Formula One teams (BSc and PhD in Mechanical Engineering).
- Sir Alan Rudge, head of operations at British Telecommunications, Chairman Engineering and Physical Sciences Research Council, President Institution of Electrical Engineers, Chairman Engineering Council.
- Peter Wheeler, chemical engineer who owned the TVR sports car company for 23 years.

== Healthcare ==
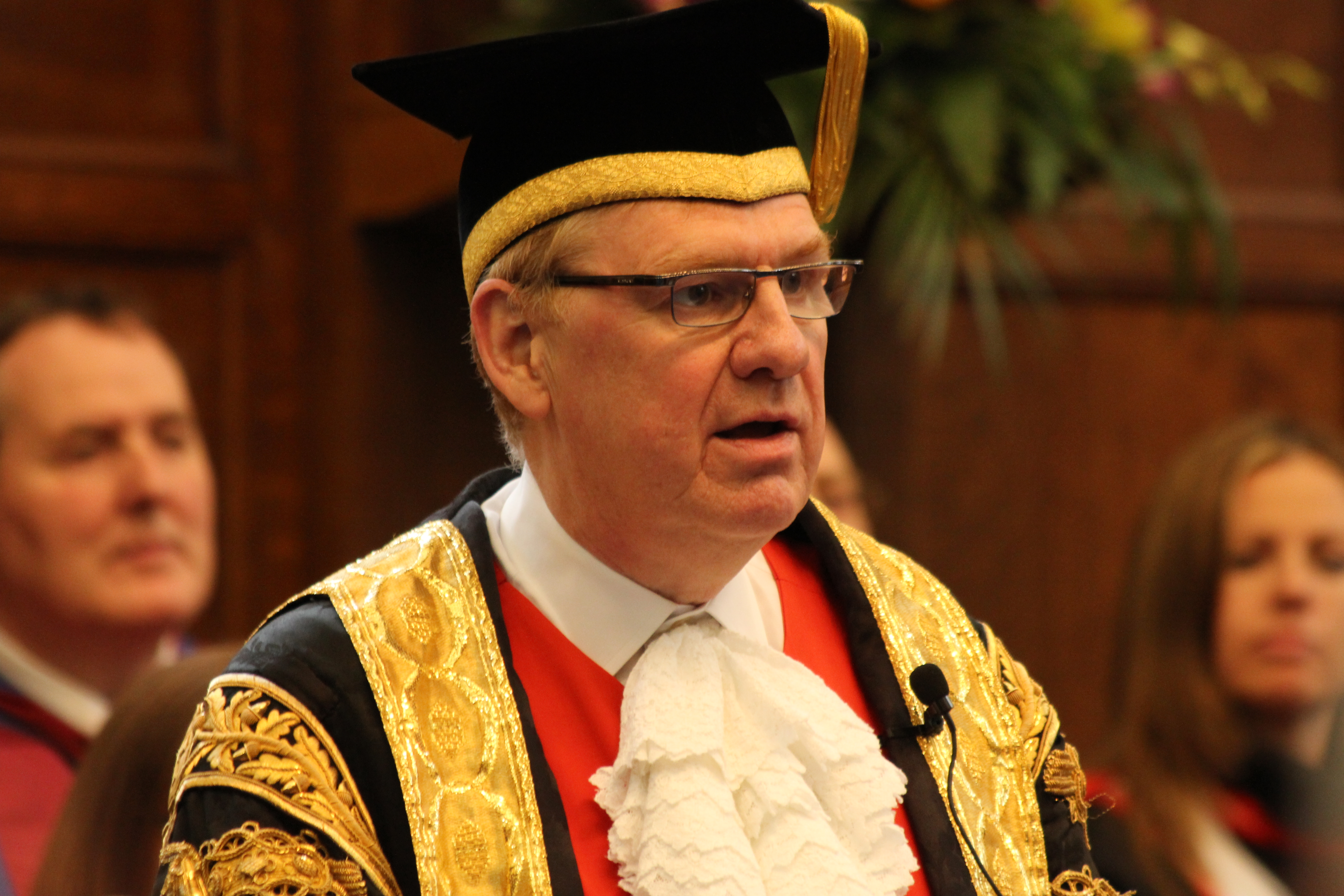
Sir Liam Donaldson

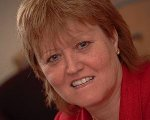
Sue Hill

- Cynthia Bower, Chief Executive of the Care Quality Commission
- Peter Carter, general secretary and Chief Executive of the Royal College of Nursing
- Barry Cockcroft, Chief Dental Officer for England
- Sir Guy Dain, Chairman of the British Medical Association 1943-9 (M.B. medicine)
- Sir Liam Donaldson, Chief Medical Officer for England
- David Haslam, chair of the National Institute for Clinical Excellence
- Sue Hill, Chief Scientific Officer in the NHS
- Rowan Hillson, National Clinical Director for Diabetes ('the Diabetes Tsar') at the Department of Health, 2008–13
- Cornelius Odarquaye Quarcoopome, pioneer ophathalmologist in Ghana
- Caroline Shaw, chief executive of The Christie NHS Foundation Trust (MSc Healthcare Policy and Management, 1999)
- Andrew Vallance-Owen, Medical Director of the Bupa Group and Deputy Chairman of the Bupa Foundation

== Lawyers and judges ==
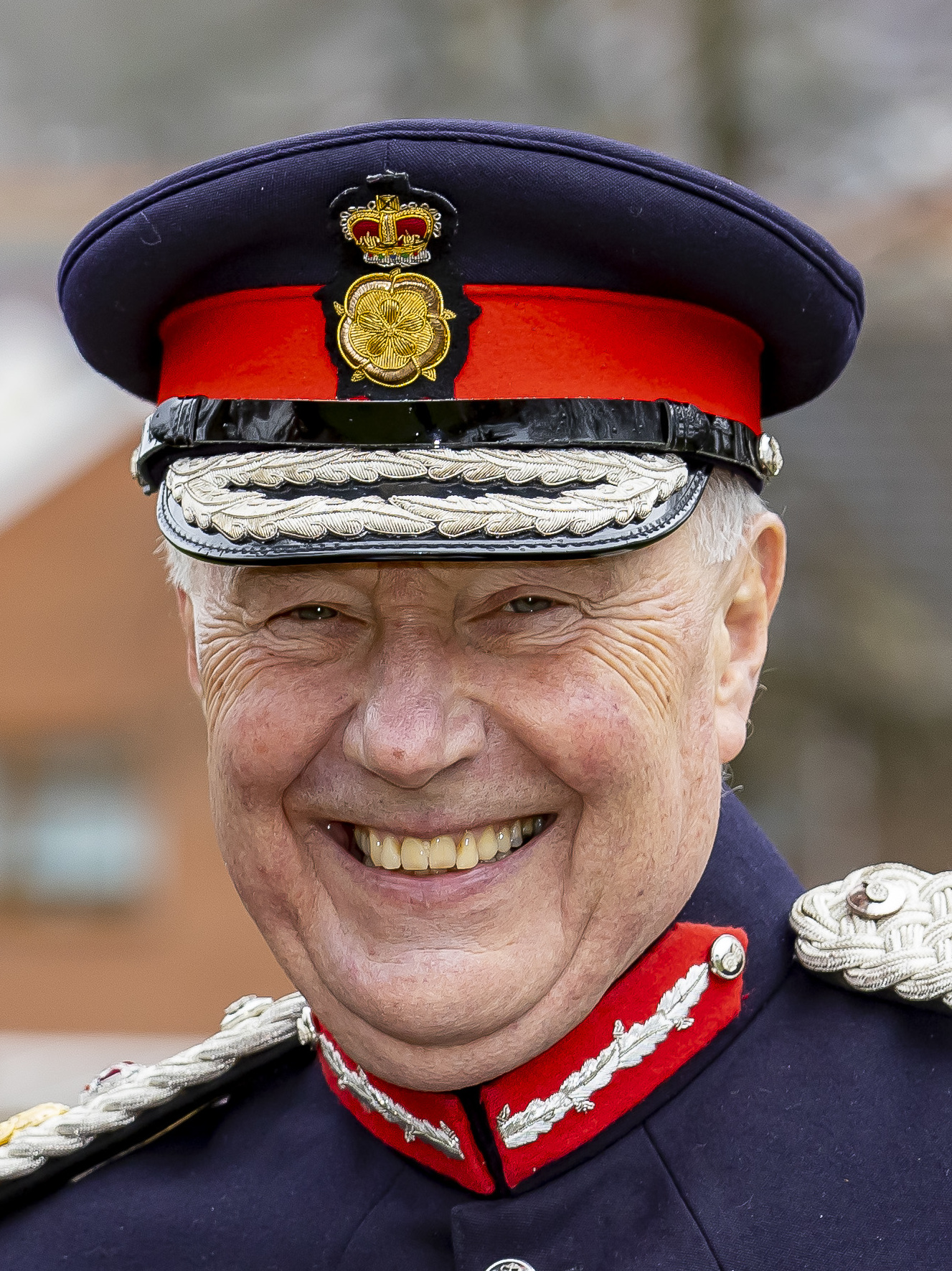
John Crabtree in the uniform of Lord Lieutenant of the West Midlands

- Dixon Kwame Afreh, Justice of the Supreme Court of Ghana (2002–2003)
- Nazir Afzal, Chief Crown Prosecutor of the Crown Prosecution Service (CPS) for North West England
- Michelle Arana, first female Justice of the Supreme Court of Belize (LLM Commercial Law, 2004)
- Brian Barker QC, Recorder of London (the senior judge at the Old Bailey), former Common Serjeant of London (the second most senior judge at the Old Bailey)
- Inigo Bing, Circuit Judge (LLB, 1966)
- Sophie Chandauka, corporate lawyer and Head of Asset Financing at Virgin Money in London
- John Crabtree, lawyer and businessman; Lord Lieutenant of the West Midlands
- Sir Michael Davies, High Court Judge, one of the first judges to specifically handle defamation cases
- Lady Justice Nicola Davies, Lady Justice of Appeal
- Michael Dudley, Circuit Judge
- Sir Henry Globe, High Court Judge (LLB)
- David Allen Green, lawyer and writer
- Robert Kisanga, Justice of Appeal at the Court of Appeal in Tanzania (LLB)
- Geoffrey Ma, Chief Justice of the Court of Final Appeal of Hong Kong
- Eunice Musiime, Executive Director of Akina Mama wa Afrika (AMwA)
- Sandie Okoro, Senior Vice President Legal, World Bank
- Sir Philip Otton, Lord Justice of Appeal, Justice of Appeal Gibraltar, judge of the Qatar Civil and Commercial Court (LLB)
- David Pearl, President of the Immigration Appeal Tribunal and of the Care Standards Tribunal, member of the judicial appointments commission
- John Charles Price, Circuit Judge
- Margaret Puxon, Circuit Judge, obstetrician and gynaecologist
- John Reddihough, Circuit Judge who presided in the Munir Hussain Case (1968 LLB)
- Phil Shiner, lawyer struck off for misconduct
- Robert Tang, judge of the Court of Final Appeal of Hong Kong
- Alan Taylor, circuit judge (1960 LLB)
- Dame Lucy Theis, High Court judge
- Sir David Yardley
- Alison Young, Sir David Williams Professor of Public Law at the University of Cambridge

== Media and journalism ==
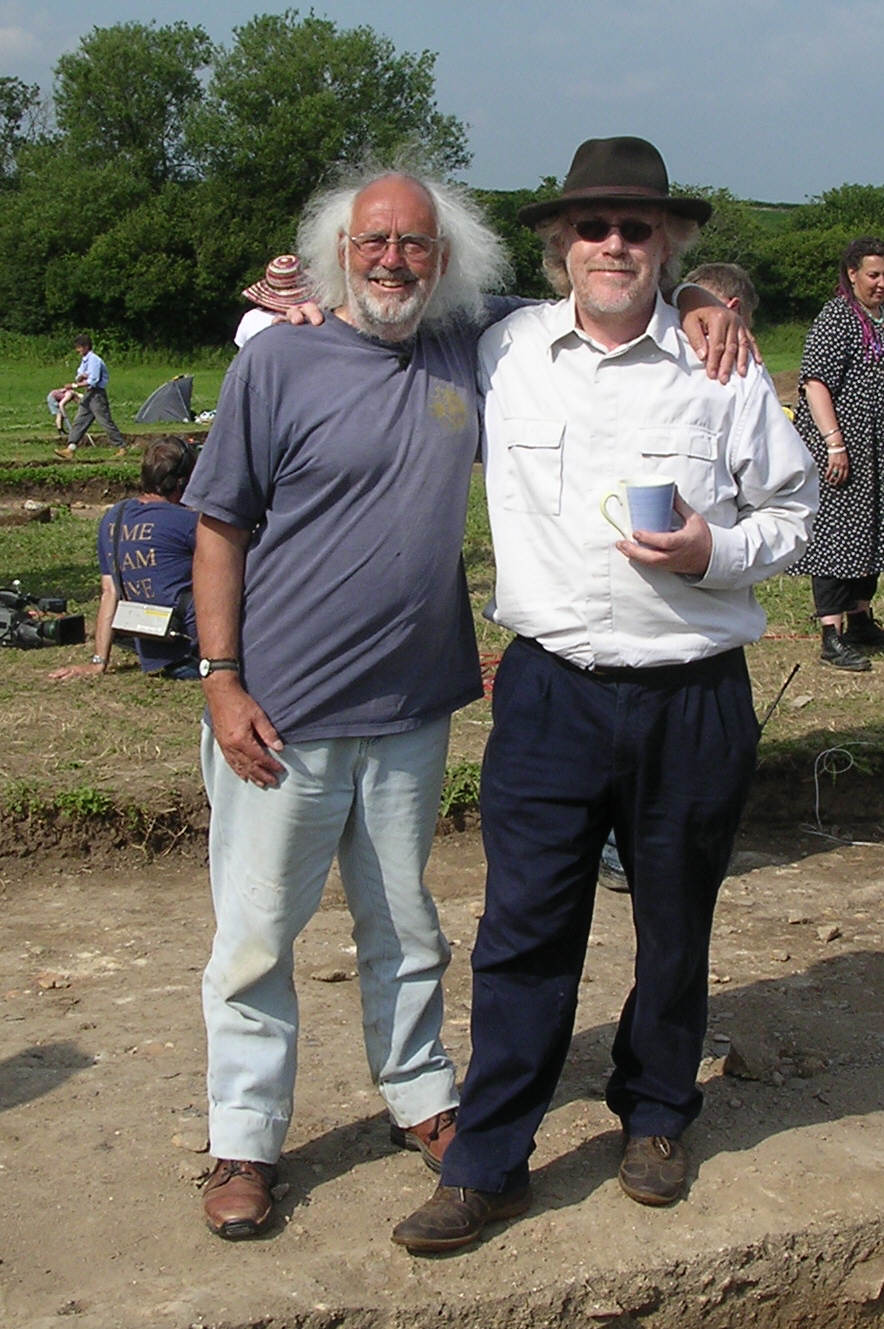
Mick Aston and Tim Taylor

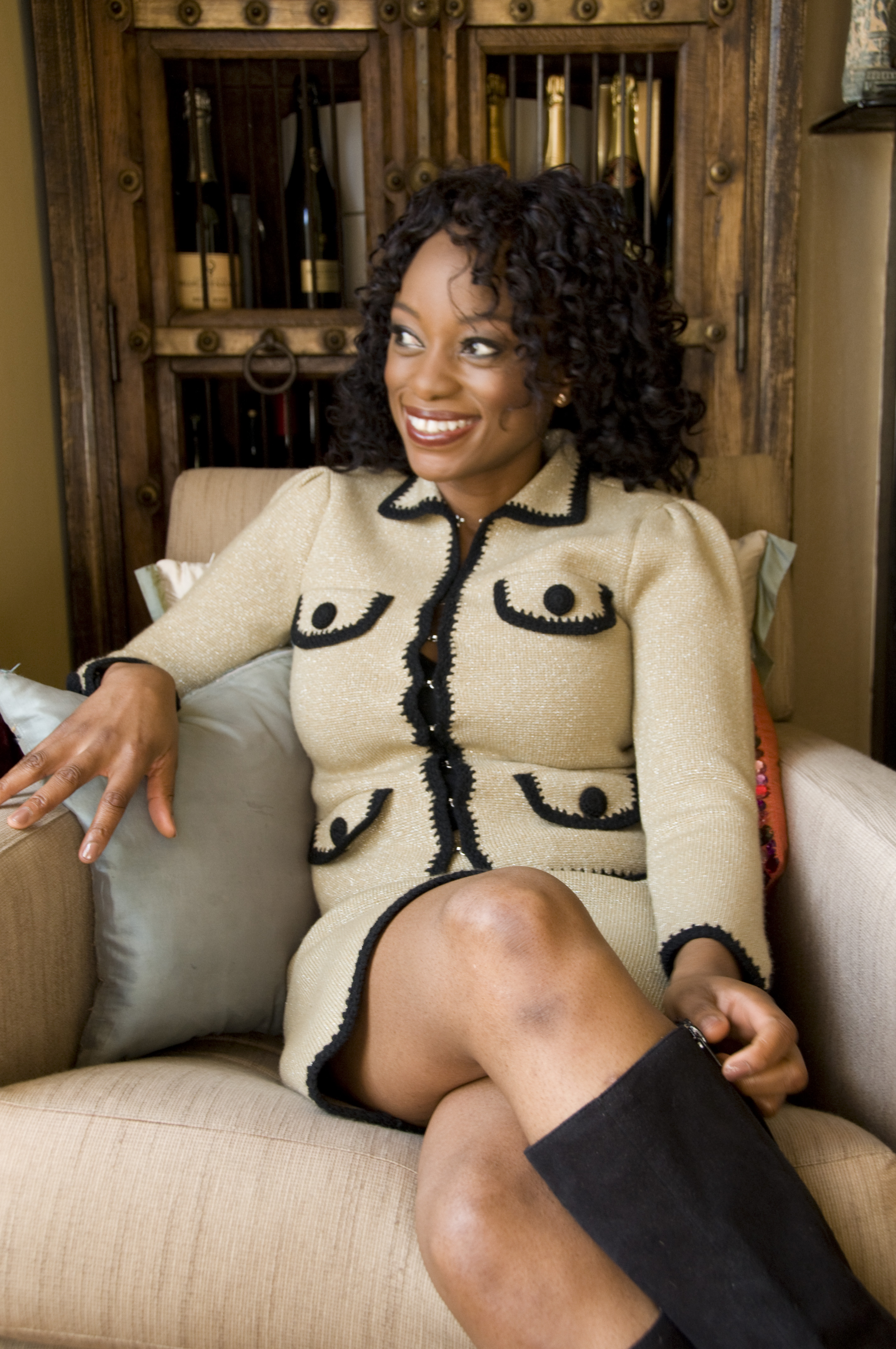
Femi Oke

- Kay Alexander, TV presenter
- Michael Aston, TV archaeologist (as "Mick Aston")
- Carol Barnes, television newsreader and broadcaster
- Jacquie Beltrao, presenter
- David Bergman, Bangladesh-based journalist
- Michael Collie, journalist, TV presenter
- Ellie Crisell, journalist, TV presenter
- David Currie, Baron Currie of Marylebone, chairman of Ofcom and the Competition and Markets Authority, and member of the House of Lords
- Alan Davey, controller of BBC Radio 3, former chief executive of Arts Council England
- Alex Deakin, BBC weatherman
- Alan Dedicoat, announcer
- Philip Eden, weather journalist and weather historian
- Philippa Forrester, TV presenter
- Jane Garvey, broadcast journalist, presenter of Woman's Hour on BBC Radio 4 (2007–)
- Jon Gaunt, radio presenter and The Sun columnist
- Joanna Gosling, journalist, TV presenter
- Simon Groom, TV presenter
- John Hammond, weather forecaster
- Kate Harwood, television producer, BBC's Head of Drama
- Celina Hinchcliffe, presenter
- Victoria Hollins, journalist
- Richard Horton, editor-in-chief of The Lancet
- Saima Mohsin, Dawn News Senior Journalist, News Eye
- Lizo Mzimba, journalist, TV presenter and former editor of Redbrick
- Gareth Neame, Emmy, Golden Globe and BAFTA award winning TV & Film Producer/Executive
- Nanjala Nyabola, Kenyan writer
- Femi Oke, presenter
- Ben Shephard, TV presenter
- Terry Spencer, war photographer for Life magazine
- Chris Tarrant, TV presenter
- Tim Taylor, creator and Producer of Channel 4's series Time Team
- Simon Thomas, Sky Sports reporter
- Baroness Wheatcroft, former editor of the Sunday Telegraph, sits on the Conservative bench of the House of Lords
- Brian Whitaker, journalist

== Musicians ==
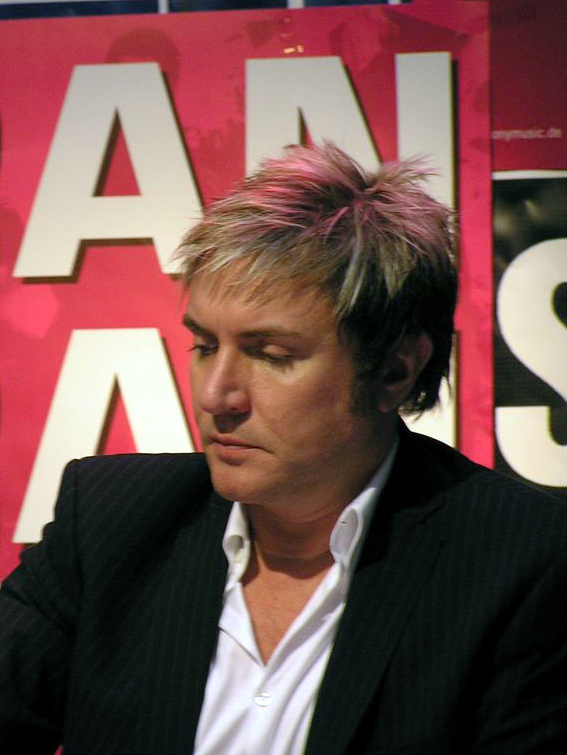
Simon Le Bon

- Natasha Barrett, composer
- Dame Josephine Barstow, soprano
- Janet Beat, early electronic music composer
- John Casken, composer
- Spencer Davis, 1960s pop star
- Sir Edward Downes, conductor
- Jonathan Goldstein, award-winning composer
- Gita Gutawa, Indonesian singer
- Amrita Hunjan, model and singer in R'n'B/pop band Rouge
- Simon Le Bon, lead singer, lyricist and musician of the band Duran Duran and its offshoot Arcadia
- Jan Linton, singer and musician
- Natasha Marsh, operatic soprano
- Roy Massey, organist and choir director
- Adrian Moore, composer
- Brian Priestman, conductor and music educator
- David Prior, sound artist and composer
- Sister Bliss, born Ayalah Bentovim, founder member of the band Faithless
- Bill Sharpe composer, pianist and founder member of the band Shakatak
- Karl Willetts, vocalist
- Peter Wishart, composer
- Michael Wolters, composer

== Politics and government ==
=== Heads of state and government ===
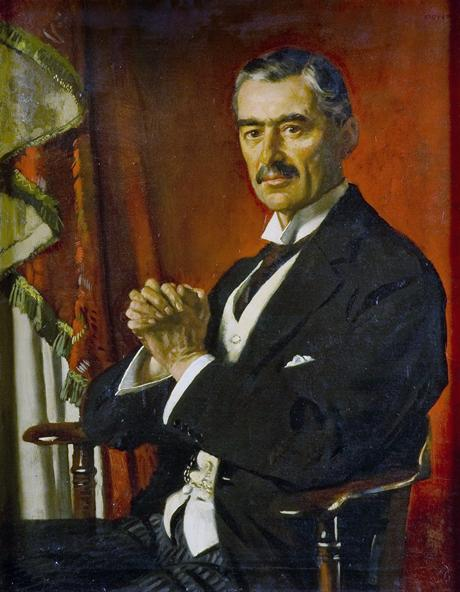
Prime Minister Neville Chamberlain

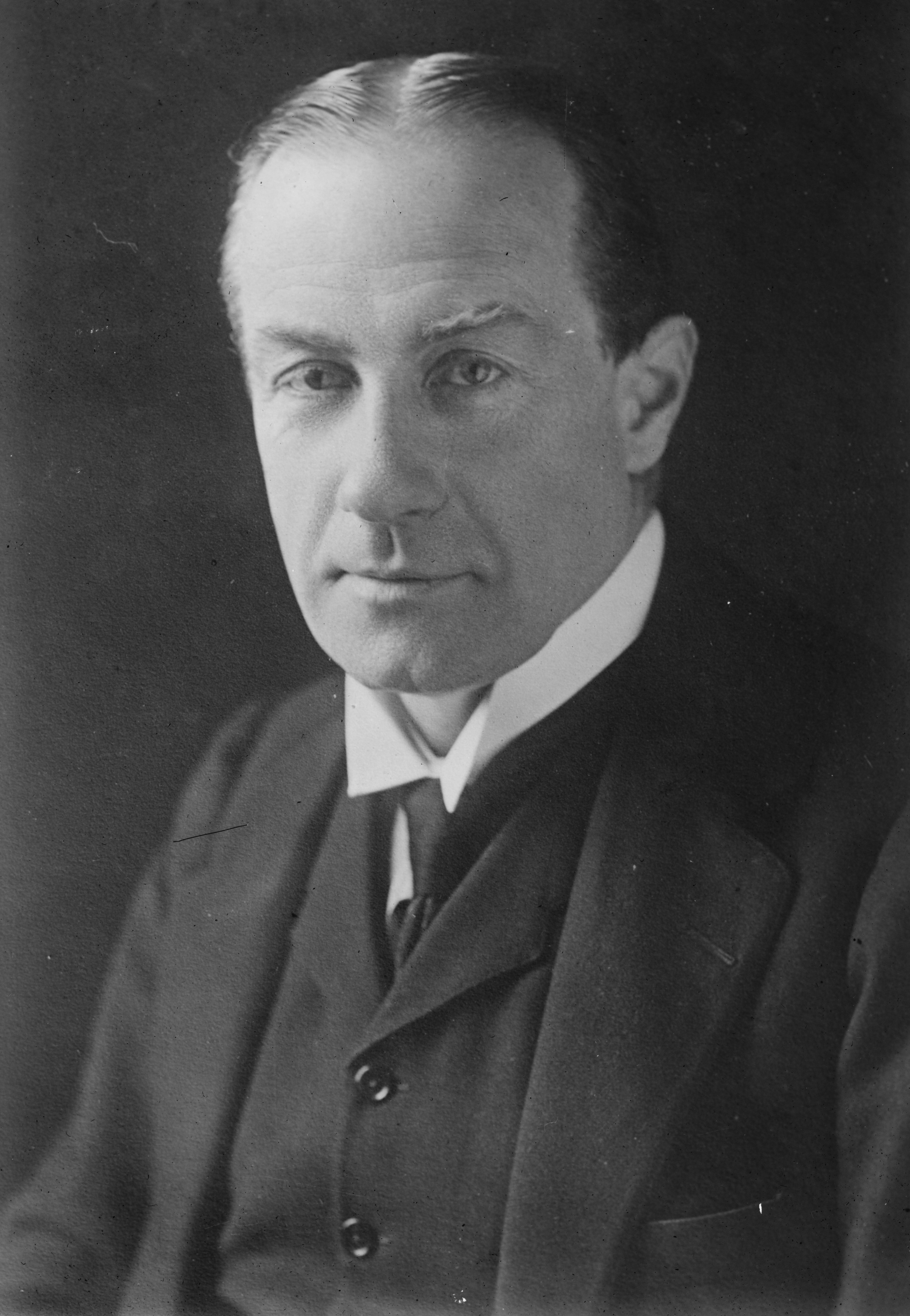
Prime Minister Stanley Baldwin

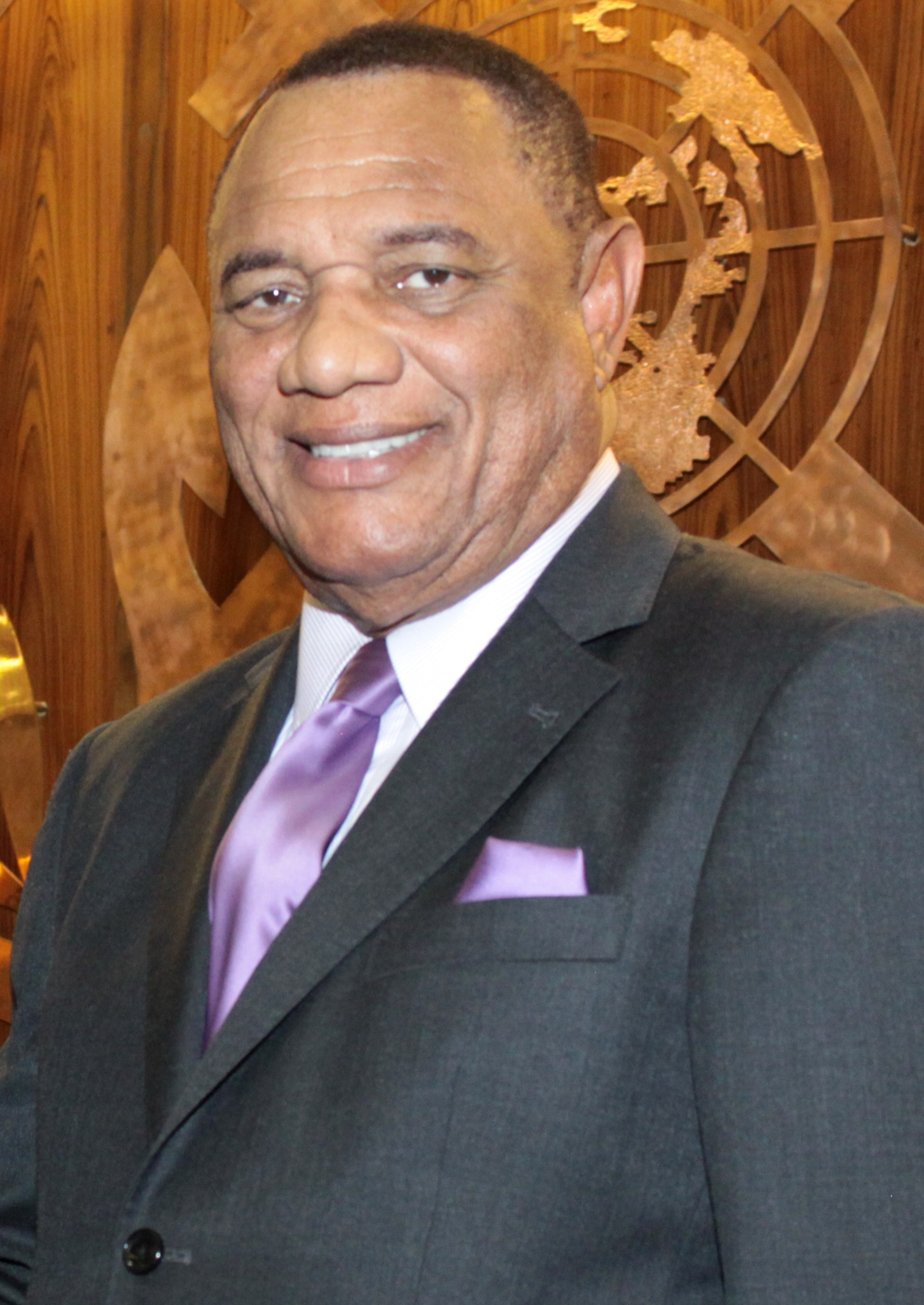
Prime Minister Perry Christie

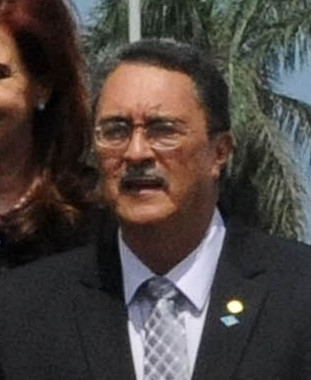
Prime Minister Kenny Anthony

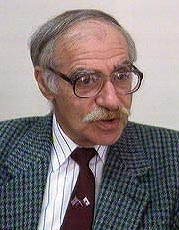
Chief Minister Joe Bossano

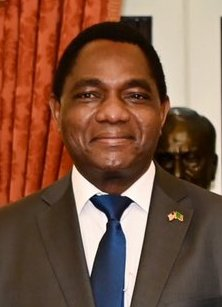
President of Zambia Hakainde Hichilema

| State | Leader | Office |
|---|---|---|
| St. Lucia | Kenny Anthony | Prime Minister of St. Lucia, 1997–2006, 2011– |
| United Kingdom | Stanley Baldwin | Prime Minister of the United Kingdom, 1923–24, 1924–29, 1935–37 |
| Gibraltar | Joe Bossano | Chief Minister of Gibraltar, 1988–96 |
| United Kingdom | Neville Chamberlain | Prime Minister of the United Kingdom, 1937–40 |
| The Bahamas | Perry Christie | Prime Minister of the Bahamas, 2005–07, 2012– |
| Zambia | Edgar Lungu | President of Zambia, 2021– |

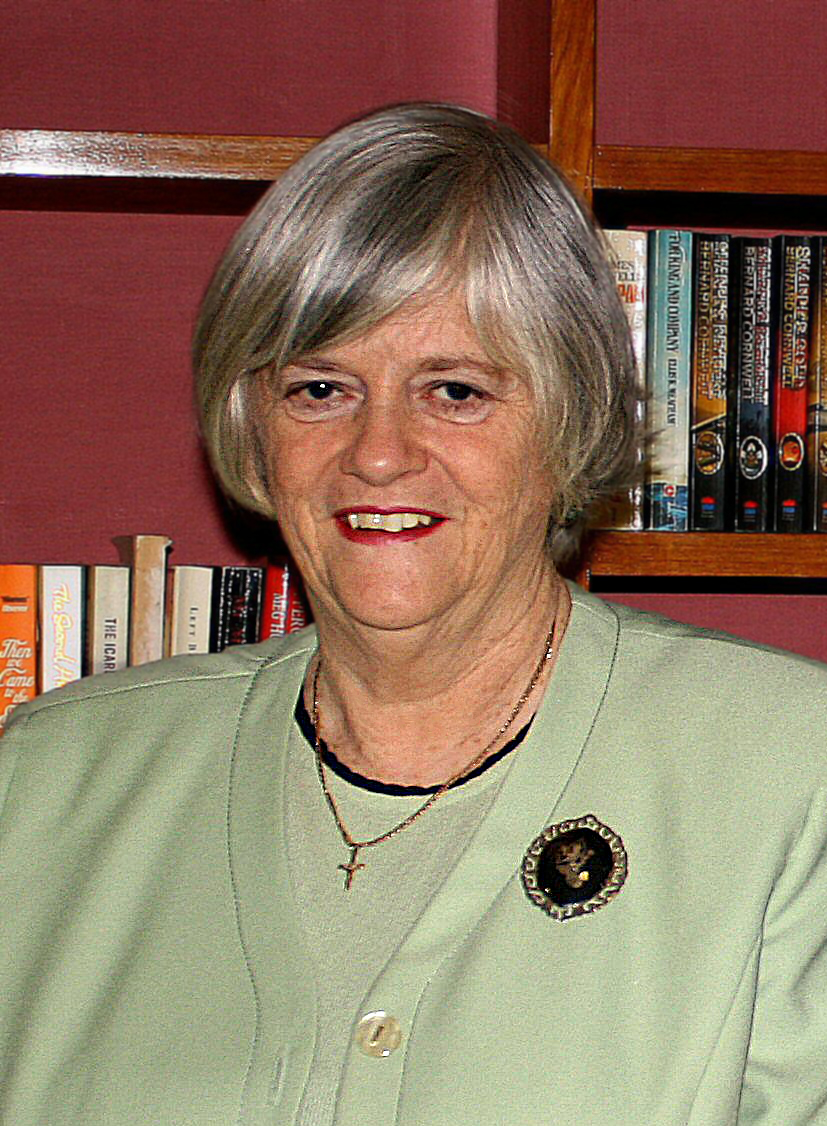
Ann Widdecombe

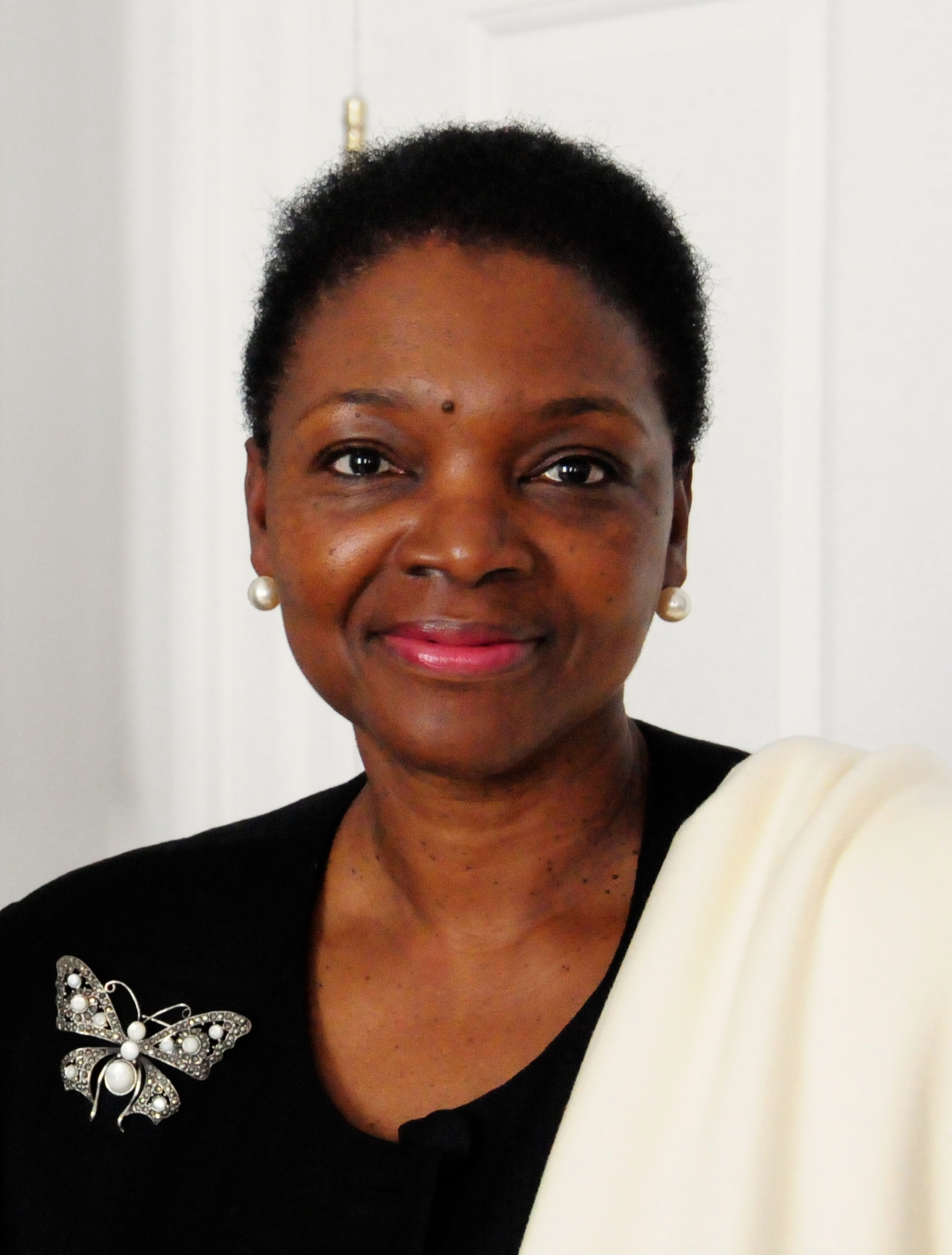
Valerie Amos, Baroness Amos

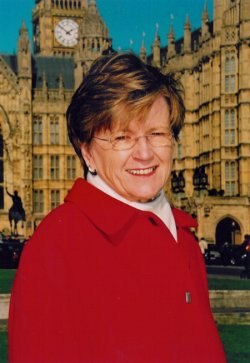
Hilary Armstrong, Baroness Armstrong of Hill Top

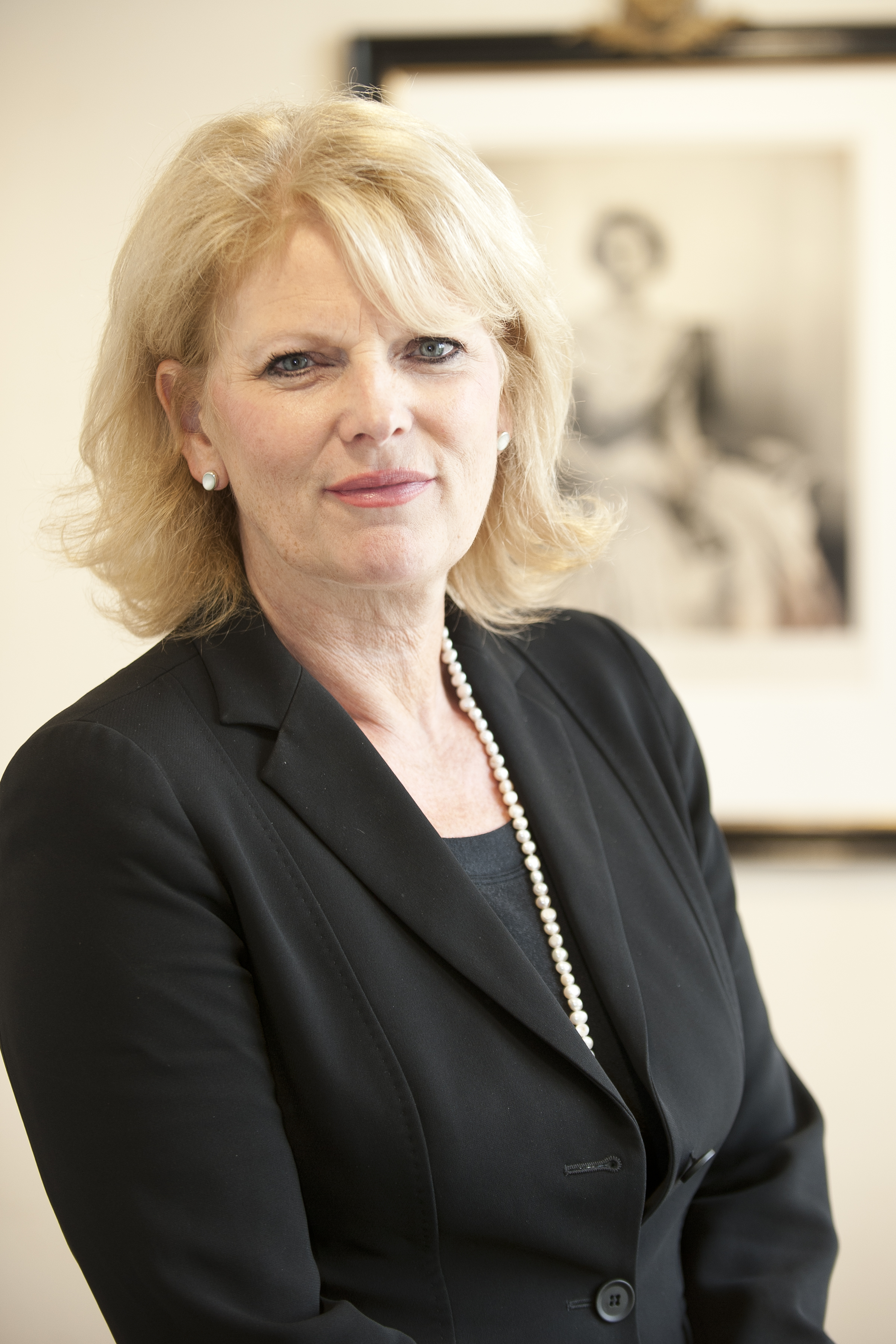
Anna Soubry, Minister of State for Defence

=== United Kingdom ===
- Valerie Amos, first black woman to sit in the British Cabinet
- Hilary Armstrong, Labour MP, former cabinet minister
- Susan Atkins, Service Complaints Commissioner for the Armed Forces (LLB, 1973)
- Rosie Barnes, SDP MP
- Sir Anthony Beaumont-Dark, MP
- Peter Bennett, 1st Baron Bennett of Edgbaston, Conservative MP
- Phil Bennion, MEP
- Luciana Berger, MP
- Kumar Bhattacharyya, Baron Bhattacharyya, Labour member of the House of Lords
- Bob Blizzard, Labour MP
- Sir Albert Bore, leader of Birmingham City Council
- Sir Neville Bosworth, leader of Birmingham City Council
- John Butcher, former MP
- Pratap Chitnis, Baron Chitnis, British Liberal political organizer
- Sarah Cox, British civil servant
- George Craddock, MP
- Valerie Davey, MP
- Jane Davidson, minister for environment, sustainability and housing in the Welsh Assembly Government
- David Drew, Labour MP
- Peter Duncan, former MP
- Richard Edwards, Welsh Labour Party politician
- Derek Fatchett, MP, Minister of State for Foreign Affairs (Deputy Foreign Secretary) 1997-99
- Elizabeth Filkin, former Parliamentary Commissioner for Standards
- Karen Gillon, Member of Scottish Parliament
- Matthew Green, MP
- Harold Gurden, MP
- Patrick Hall, former MP
- Sir Michael Higgs, MP
- Charles William Hobley, pioneering colonial administrator in Kenya
- Sir Stephen Houghton, Chair of the Special Interest Group of Metropolitan Authorities (SIGMA) (MSc Local Governance, 2004)
- Sir Tom Jeffery, Director General for Children, Young People and Families at the Department for Education
- Lynne Jones, Labour MP
- Doreen Massey, Baroness Massey of Darwen, Labour member of the House of Lords
- Basil McCrea, UUP member of the Northern Ireland Assembly
- Margaret Moran, former MP
- Jessica Morden, Labour MP
- James Morris, MP
- Jess Phillips, Labour MP
- Colin Phipps, MP
- Eric Roll, Baron Roll of Ipsden, former director of the Bank of England
- Nicola Richards, Conservative MP for West Bromwich East
- Sir George Ernest Schuster, MP colonial administrator
- Ruth Smeeth, Baroness Anderson of Stoke-on-Trent, Labour member of the House of Lords, former MP
- Julian Smith, Conservative MP, Secretary of State for Northern Ireland
- Anna Soubry, Minister of State, former leader of Change UK
- Rachel Squire, MP
- Gisela Stuart, Labour MP (began a PhD in Trust Law at Birmingham University; did not complete)
- Zarah Sultana, Labour MP
- Richard Tracey, former Conservative MP and Minister, Member of Greater London Assembly
- Andrew Turner, Conservative MP
- John Howard Whitehouse, Liberal Member of Parliament
- Ann Widdecombe, former Minister of State and Privy Counsellor
- Phil Willis, Baron Willis of Knaresborough, Member of Parliament for Harrogate and Knaresborough (1997–2010)
- William Wilson, Labour politician, MP for Coventry constituencies

=== Africa ===
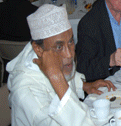
Mohamed Yusuf Haji

- Fitsum Arega, Ethiopian Ambassador to the United States
- Concy Aciro, Ugandan MP, was involved in peace negotiations and reconstruction work (MSc Poverty Reduction and Development Management)
- Juliana Azumah-Mensah, Ghanaian Minister for Women and Children's Affairs
- Rashid Beebeejaun, Deputy Prime Minister and Minister of Public Utilities of Mauritius
- James Nsaba Buturo, Ugandan MP and minister
- Mohamed Yusuf Haji, Somali politician, former Minister of Defence of Kenya
- William Selim Hanna, Egyptian politician, former Minister of Housing of Egypt
- Josiah Idowu-Fearon, formerly Bishop in the Church of Nigeria, as of 2015 Secretary General of the Anglican Consultative Council.
- Bala Garba Jahumpa, foreign minister of Gambia
- David Karimanzira, Zimbabwean politician and cabinet minister
- Didymus Mutasa, Zimbabwe's Speaker of Parliament 1980–90, Minister of State for National Security, Lands, Land Reform & Resettlement, Minister of State for Presidential Affairs
- Mark Mwandosya, Tanzanian minister
- Emmanuel Chuka Osammor, Nigerian minister
- Junedin Sado, Ethiopian cabinet minister
- Charles Ugwuh, engineer and industrialist who headed the Nigerian ministry of commerce and industry 2007-08
- Adamu Liman Ciroma, Nigeria's first archaeologist and civil servant

=== Asia ===
- Roselan Daud, Bruneian former Deputy Minister at the Prime Minister's Office
- Stephen Ho, member of the Legislative Council of Hong Kong
- Richard Hu, former Singapore Minister of Finance
- Suhaimi Kamaruddin, Malaysian politician, former chief of UMNO Youth and former Deputy Minister of Education
- Chen Liangyu, former CPC Shanghai Committee Secretary
- Pratikno, Indonesian Minister of State Secretariat
- Kanuri Lakshmana Rao, member of the Indian Parliament
- Ajit Seth, Cabinet Secretary of the Republic of India
- Tuhin Kanta Pandey, Chairperson of Securities and Exchange Board of India
- Alwyn Didar Singh, Indian former civil servant and current Secretary General of the FICCI
- Shahzada Iftikhar Uddin, member of the National Assembly of Pakistan
- Matthias Yao, former Singapore Senior Minister of State

=== The Caribbean ===
- John Delaney, Attorney-General and Minister of Legal Affairs of The Bahamas (LLB Law, 1986)
- Harold Lovell, Minister of Finance, the Economy and Public Administration Antigua and Barbuda
- Alvina Reynolds, Saint Lucian minister for Health, Wellness, Human Services and Gender Relations

=== Europe ===
- Sven Giegold, Green Party MEP
- David Hallam Labour Party MEP

=== Middle East ===
- Lucien Dahdah, Lebanese foreign minister, 1975
- Abdel Aziz Mohamed Hegazy, Egyptian Prime Minister, PhD 1951
- Abdulaziz bin Mohieddin Khoja, Information and Culture Minister of Saudi Arabia 2009-14

=== Oceania ===
- Gerry Bates, member of the Tasmanian House of Assembly
- Michael Johnson, member of the Australian House of Representatives
- ʻAna Taufeʻulungaki, Tongan minister

=== International organisations and ambassadors ===
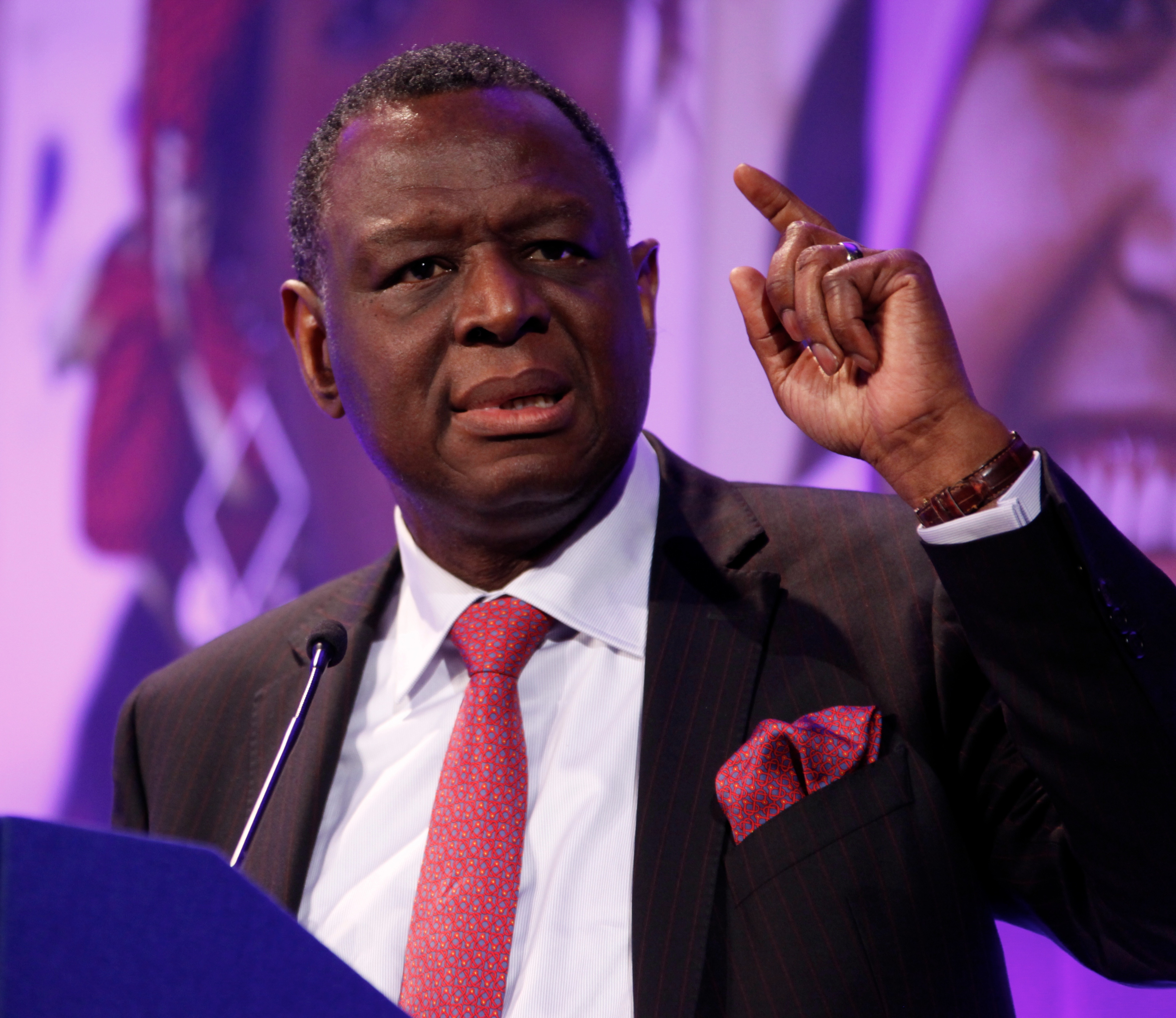
Babatunde Osotimehin

- Akbar S. Ahmed, Pakistan's High Commissioner to the UK
- Kevin Isaac, High Commissioner of Saint Kitts and Nevis to the UK (MA International Studies 1995)
- Abdulaziz bin Mohieddin Khoja, Saudi ambassador and minister of culture and information
- George Kirya, Ugandan High Commissioner to the UK
- Thomas Adeoye Lambo, deputy director general World Health Organization
- Babatunde Osotimehin, Under-Secretary-General of the United Nations and former Nigerian Minister of Health
- Desra Percaya, Ambassador and Permanent Representative of the Republic of Indonesia to the United Nations in New York
- Sir David Aubrey Scott, UK High Commissioner to New Zealand and Ambassador to South Africa

== Religion ==
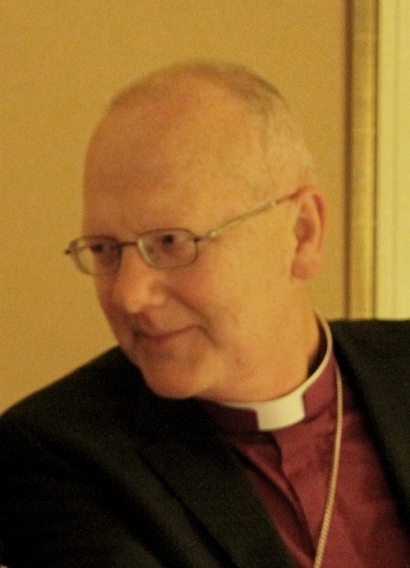
Bishop Alan Smith

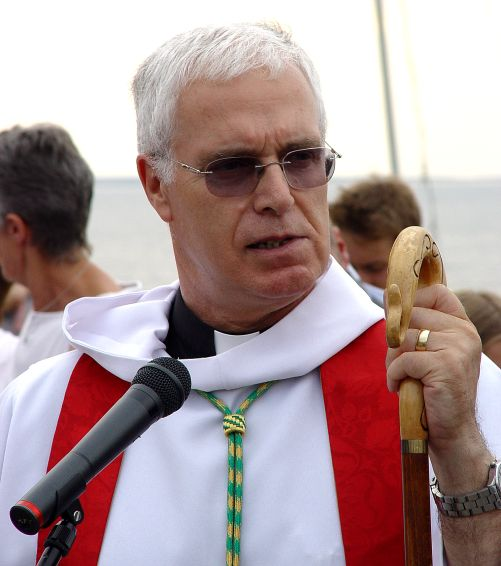
Bishop Stephen Venner

- Caroline Baston, Archdeacon of the Isle of Wight
- Paul Bayes, Bishop of Liverpool
- Brian Castle, Bishop of Tonbridge
- Jeff Cuttell, Dean of Derby
- Colin Docker, Bishop of Horsham
- Philip Egan, Catholic Bishop of Portsmouth
- Samy Fawzy, Archbishop of Alexandria
- Paul Hackwood, Archdeacon of Loughborough
- Arthur Hawes, Archdeacon of Lincoln
- Michael Higgins, Dean of Ely
- Toby Howarth, Bishop of Bradford
- Josiah Idowu-Fearon, formerly Bishop in the Church of Nigeria, as of 2015 Secretary General of the Anglican Communion.
- Herbert Jones, Dean of Manchester
- Michael Langrish, Bishop of Exeter
- Bolly Lapok, Metropolitan Archbishop; Primate of the Anglican Church of the Province of South East Asia; Bishop of Kuching
- Sidney Lowe, Archdeacon of Bradford
- Kevin McDonald, Archbishop of Southwark
- Eber Priestley, Bishop of Medak
- Keith Riglin, Bishop of Argyll and The Isles
- David Shearlock, Dean of Truro
- Alan Smith, Bishop of St Albans
- Georges Titre Ande, Archbishop of the Congo
- Stephen Venner, Bishop to the Forces and Bishop of the Falkland Islands
- Lucy Winkett, Rector of St James's Piccadilly and regular contributor to Radio 4's "Thought for the Day"

== Royalty ==
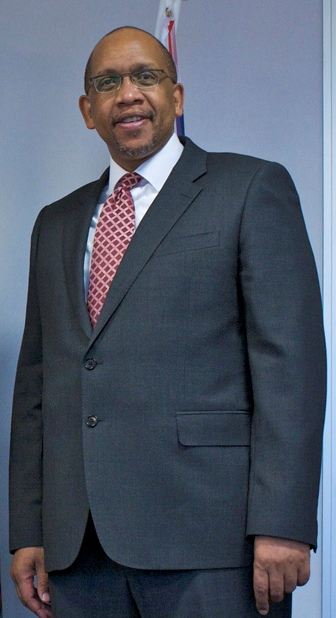
Prince Seeiso of Lesotho

- Prince Seeiso of Lesotho, Lesotho High Commissioner to the United Kingdom
- Prince Manucher Mirza Farman Farmaian, sixth son of Prince Abdol Hossein Mirza Farmanfarma and of Batoul Khanoum, Iran

== Sport ==
- Zafar Altaf, former cricketer for Pakistan; later Federal Secretary for Agriculture in the Pakistan civil service
- Joey Barrington, squash player, son of Jonah Barrington
- Tom Bertram, England hockey player
- Sophie Bray, British field hockey player
- Lisa Clayton, Dowager Viscountess Cobham, first British woman to sail single-handed around the world
- Julie Crane, high-jumper
- Allison Curbishley, Olympic 400m athlete
- Melanie Easter, British Paralympic swimmer and cyclist
- Hannah England, middle-distance athlete
- Naomi Folkard, British archer
- David Gill, Chief executive of Manchester United
- Luke Gunn, cross country runner
- Ian Hall, cricketer, Batsman for Derbyshire (1959–72)
- Jill Clarke Harrison, long distance runner
- Patrick Head, co-founder and Engineering Director of the Williams Formula One team
- Rachel Heal, racing cyclist
- David Hemp, cricketer who represented Bermuda in the Cricket World Cup and also represented England Lions
- Andy Holden, English long distance runner
- Rachel Joyce, triathlete
- Paul Manning, professional track cyclist
- Simon Mantell, England hockey player
- Baz Moffat, British rower
- Shelley Newman, retired discus thrower
- Lily Owsley, Olympic hockey gold medallist
- Phil Pask, senior physiotherapist to England national rugby union team and British and Irish Lions rugby union squad
- Adam Pengilly, British skeleton racer
- Paul Ramsden, first alpinist to win the Piolet d'Or five times
- Pam Relph, British adaptive rower who competed at the 2012 Summer Paralympics
- Nick Smith, Olympic canoeist
- Frank Tickner, cross country runner
- Victor Ubogu, former Bath and England rugby union player
- Chrissie Wellington, first British athlete to win the Ironman Triathlon World Championship

== Others ==
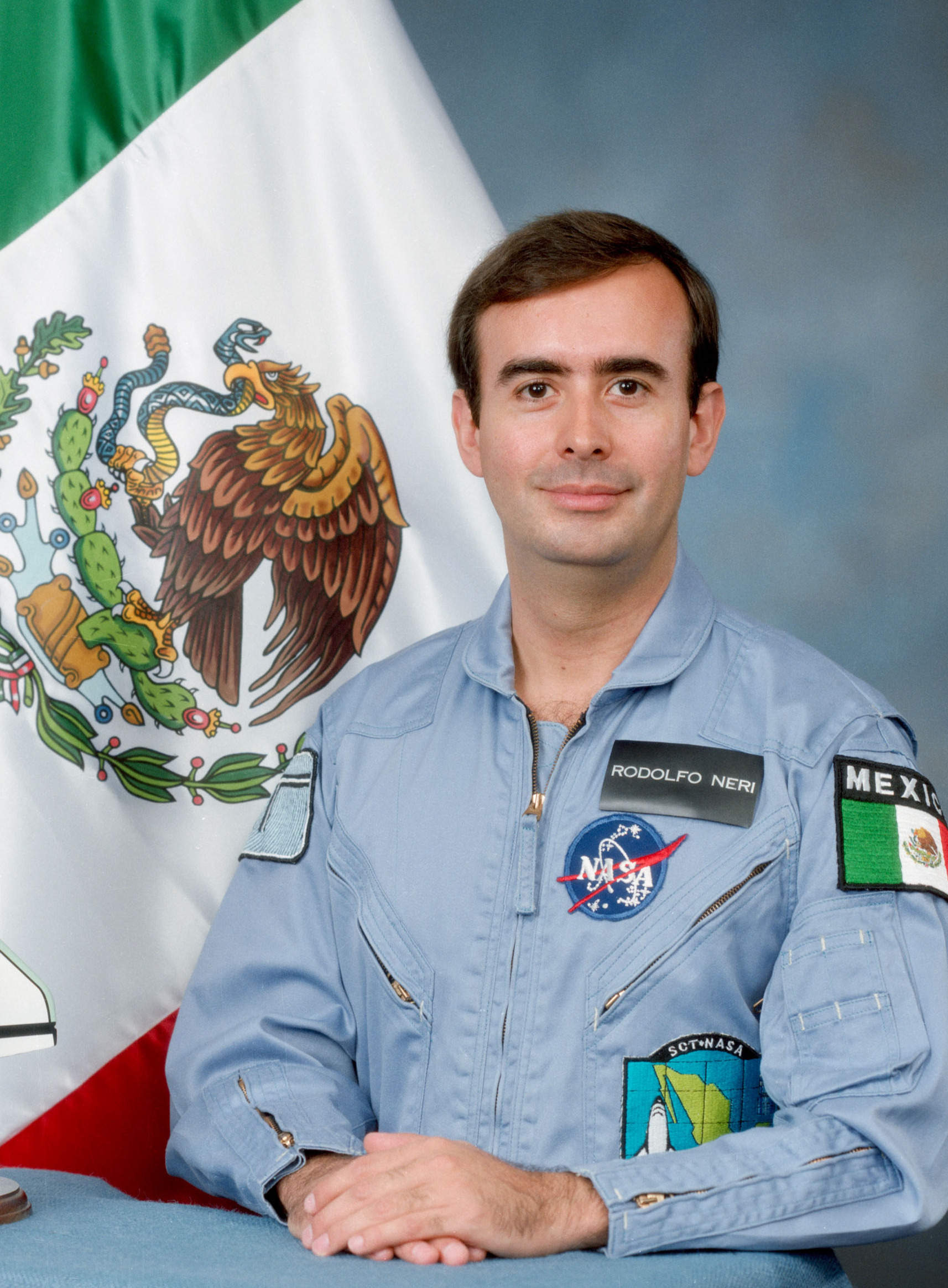
Rodolfo Neri Vela

- Nasser Azam, contemporary artist (BCom)
- Dame Christine Braddock, Principal and Chief Executive of the Birmingham Metropolitan College, High Sheriff of the West Midlands (BPhilEd Education, 1989)
- Jo Bradwell, businessman and philanthropist who donated £15 million to establish the Forest Research Institute at Birmingham University (medicine 1968)
- Terry Bramall, businessman and philanthropist (BSc Civil Engineering, 1964)
- Deborah Cadman, Chief Executive of Suffolk County Council
- Bernard Cafferty, chess master, columnist, writer, magazine editor and translator
- Sir Richard Cory-Wright Bt, 4th Baronet Cory-Wright
- Ernest Gold, Deputy Director of the Meteorological Office
- Henry Eliot Howard, ornithologist
- David Kelly, UN weapons inspector
- Doreen Liu, Singaporean businesswoman and philanthropist
- Dame Joan McVittie, transforming headteacher (BSc Biological Sciences, 1974)
- Dominique Palmer, climate activist
- Robert Parker, principal dancer Birmingham Royal Ballet, Artistic Director Elmhurst School for Dance (MPhil Education, 2011)
- Dame Vicki Paterson, transforming headteacher (BEd Education, 1978)
- Paul Ramsay, businessman, philanthropist and computer tycoon (BSc Mathematics and Computer Science, 1975; MSc Computer Science, 1976; PhD Computer Science, 1982)
- Phua Kok Khoo, physicist, Founding Director of the Institute of Advanced Studies at Nanyang Technological University and Adjunct Professor at the National University of Singapore (PhD in Mathematical Physics, 1970)
- M.A.N. Siddique, former Bangladeshi civil servant and first Managing Director of Dhaka Mass Transit Company Limited
- Jim Swire, Pan Am Flight 103 lobbier
- Rodolfo Neri Vela, Mexican astronaut, professor at the National Autonomous University of Mexico (PhD in electromagnetic radiation, 1978; postdoctoral researcher in waveguides for one year)
- David Willey, University of Pittsburgh Physics Instructor and presenter of live physics shows

== See also ==
- List of University of Birmingham people
- List of University of Birmingham academics
