= Andrew Vallance-Owen =

Physician

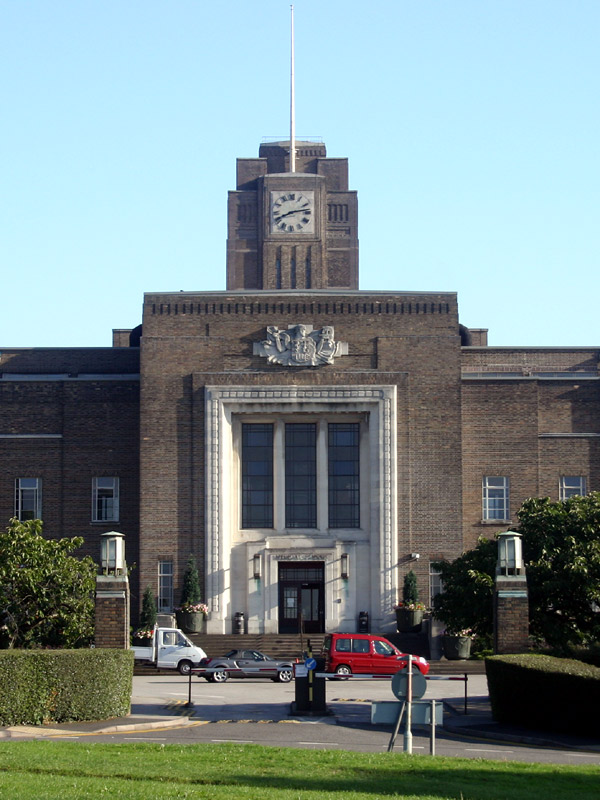
Birmingham University Medical School

Andrew John Vallance-Owen MBE (born 1951) is a British physician.

Andrew Vallance-Owen received his early education at Epsom College. Vallance-Owen graduated with the degree of MBChB in Medicine from Birmingham University in 1976 where he was President of the Guild of Students 1974-5

Vallance-Owen was Medical Director and Chief Medical Officer of the Bupa Group from 1995 to 2012. He was deputy chairman of the Bupa Foundation from 1998 to 2012. He was chairman of the Department of Health's Patient Reported Outcomes Stakeholder Group from 2009 to 2013.

Andrew Vallance-Owen was Chairman of the Council and Chairman of the Governors of the Royal Medical Foundation of Epsom College from 2009 to 2016. He is Deputy Chairman of Governors of Epsom College in Malaysia

Andrew Vallance-Owen is Chair of the Private Healthcare Information Network and Chief Medical Officer of the Medicover Group and TestCard Limited. He is also a voluntary Senior Advisor to NHS England's Behaviour Change Unit. Recent roles include: Senior Independent Director Royal Brompton and Harefield NHS Foundation Trust, Specialist Medical Advisor to Healthcare UK, UK Trade and Investment and Medical Advisor to 'iamYiam'

Vallance-Owen was awarded the honorary degree of Doctor of the University (DUniv) by Birmingham University in 2012. He was appointed a Member of the Order of the British Empire (MBE) in the 2014 Birthday Honours, for services to healthcare.
