= Keith G. Harding =

British physician

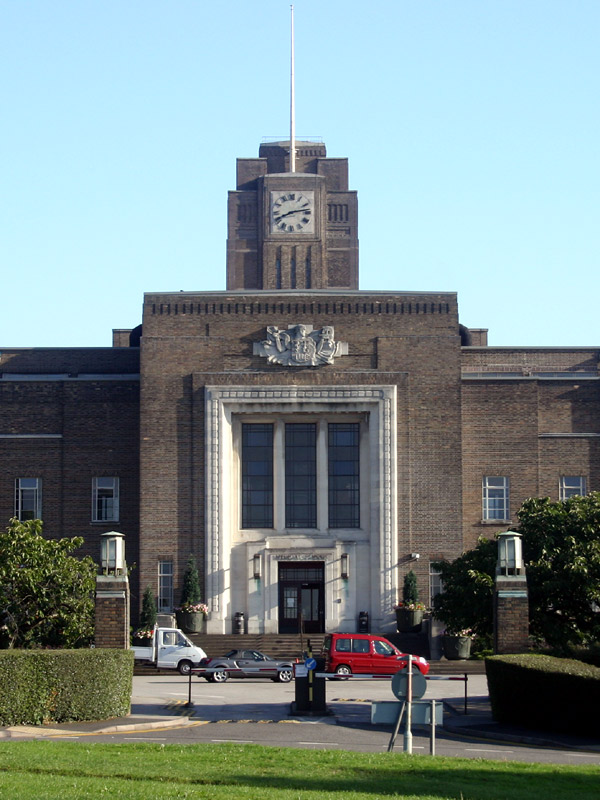
Birmingham University Medical School

Keith G. Harding CBE FRCGP FRCP FRCS FLSW is a British physician.

Harding graduated from Birmingham University with an MBChB degree in Medicine in 1976.

Harding is the Director of TIME Institute (Translation, Innovation, Methodology and Engagement) and Head of the Wound Healing Research Unit in the School of Medicine at Cardiff University. He is Clinical Lead for Wound Healing in the Cardiff & Vale NHS Trust. In September 2013 Harding was appointed Dean of Clinical Innovation at Cardiff University. From 2002 to 2005 he was Head of the Department of Surgery at Cardiff University. He is Editor-in-Chief of the International Wound Journal.

Keith Harding is a Past President of the European Tissue Repair Society. He was the first President of the European Pressure Ulcer Advisory Panel, and first Recorder of the European Wound Management Association. Harding was Chair of the International Working Group on Wound Healing in Diabetic Foot Disease in 2003. He was Chair of the Expert Working Group that produced a range of International Consensus Documents from 2004 to 2011.

Professor Harding was appointed a Commander of the Order of the British Empire in the 2013 New Year Honours for services to medicine and healthcare. Harding is a Fellow of the Royal College of General Practitioners, a Fellow of the Royal College of Physicians, and a Fellow of the Royal College of Surgeons.

In 2014, Professor Harding was elected a Fellow of the Learned Society of Wales.
