= Terry Slater (geographer) =

Terry R. Slater is a British geographer. He is an honorary senior research fellow in Historical Geography at the University of Birmingham, UK. Born in Bromley but raised in Charlton he was educated at Hull University, University College, London and the University of Birmingham.

He joined the University of Birmingham as a lecturer in 1971 and continued until retirement. He devoted a lot of his spare time to the Church of England in Birmingham that led to him being made an honorary Lay Canon of St Philip's Cathedral, Birmingham in 2005.

== Research interests ==
Slater's research interests include:

- English medieval town planning
- Town-plan analysis
- Medieval towns and the Church
- European medieval urban development
- North American urban development
- Urban conservation
- Historic Towns Atlases
- Early Industrial Towns
- Faith in the City

== Publications ==
- 1980 The making of the Scottish countryside (edited with M L Parry) (Croom Helm, London)
- 1982 Field and forest: an historical geography of Warwickshire and Worcestershire (edited with P J Jarvis) (Geo Books, Norwich)
- 1990 The built form of western cities: essays for M R G Conzen on the occasion of his 80th birthday (University Press, Leicester)
- 1996 Managing a Conurbation: Birmingham and its Region (edited with A. J. Gerrard) (Brewin Books, Studley)
- 1997 A History of Warwickshire (Phillimore, Chichester) (2nd revised edition)
- 1998 The Church in the Medieval Town (edited with G. Rosser) (Ashgate, Aldershot) 307 pp
- 2000 Urban Decline 100-1600 (ed.) (Ashgate, ALdershot) 325pp
- 2002 Edgbaston Past (Phillimore, Chichester)
- 2005 A Centenary History of the Diocese of Birmingham (Phillimore, Chichester)
- 2007 A County of Small Towns: The Development of Hertfordshire's Urban Landscape to 1800 (University of Hertfordshire Press, Hatfield)
- 2016 The Pride of the Place. The Cathedral Church of St Philip, Birmingham, 1715-2015 (Privately Published, Birmingham)
