= Monica Fletcher =

British nurse

Monica Fletcher OBE (née Smith) is a British nurse.

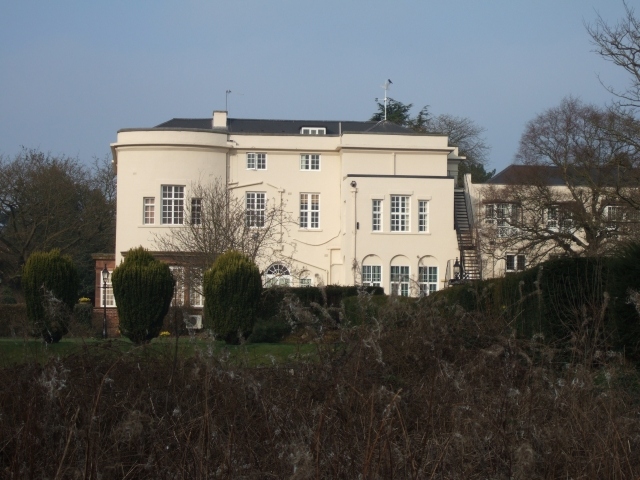
Park House, University of Birmingham

Monica Fletcher has been Chief Executive of Education for Health, an international medical education charity based in Warwick which focuses on improving the quality of life of people living with long term conditions through the provision of high quality health professional education, since 2001.

Fletcher graduated from the Health Services Management Centre at Birmingham University with an MSc degree in Healthcare Policy and Management in 1997.

Monica Fletcher was co-director of Primary Care for the NHS Executive London, Director of Primary Care in the Tower Hamlets Healthcare Trust, and Nurse Advisor in Birmingham. She is past Chair of the European Lung Foundation.

Fletcher was appointed an Officer of the Order of the British Empire (OBE) in the 2013 Birthday Honours for services to nursing and nursing education. She was named as a Fellow of The Queen's Nursing Institute in 2014. Fletcher is an Associate of the Center for Managing Chronic Disease at the University of Michigan. Fletcher took up the role of Knowledge Exchange Lead for the Asthma UK Centre for Applied Research (AUKCAR) in 2015.
