= Jo Bradwell =

British philanthropist, physician, and businessman

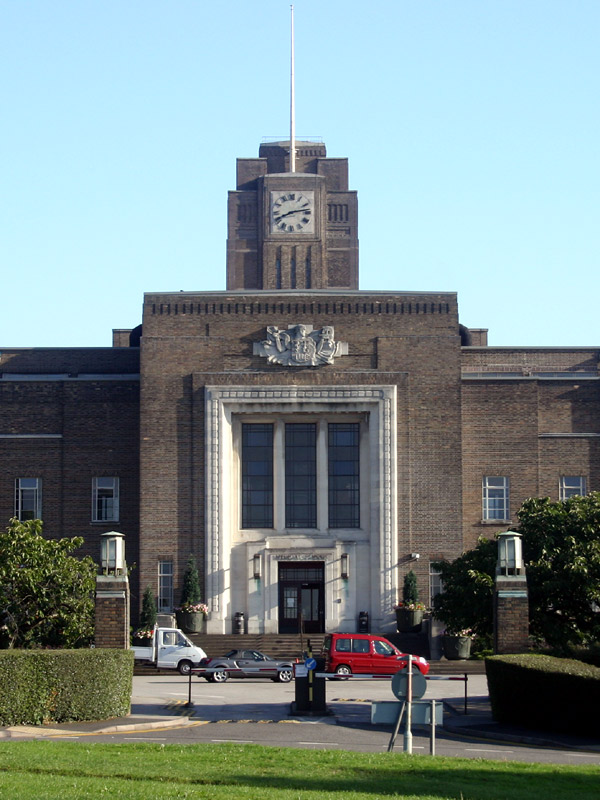
Birmingham University Medical School

A. R. (Jo) Bradwell is a British philanthropist, physician and businessman.

Bradwell donated £15 million to Birmingham University to establish new forestry research centre. The Birmingham Institute of Forest Research (BIFoR) is currently being established. BIFoR will focus on the impact of climate and environmental change on woodlands, and the resilience of trees to pests and diseases.

Bradwell graduated from Birmingham University with an MBChB degree in medicine in 1968. He was a Professor of Immunology at Birmingham University’s Medical School. Bradwell founded a university medical school ‘spin-out’ company in 1983 which developed a range of cancer tests, in addition to diagnostic products for immune deficiency and autoimmunity. Bradwell’s company won the Queens Award for Export Achievement, as well as the Queens Award for Enterprise.

Bradwell was awarded the honorary degree of DSc by the University of Birmingham in 2012. He is also chairman and founder of the Birmingham Medical Research Expeditionary Society.
