= Martin Brown (cancer biologist) =

British scientist

John Martin Brown is a British scientist.

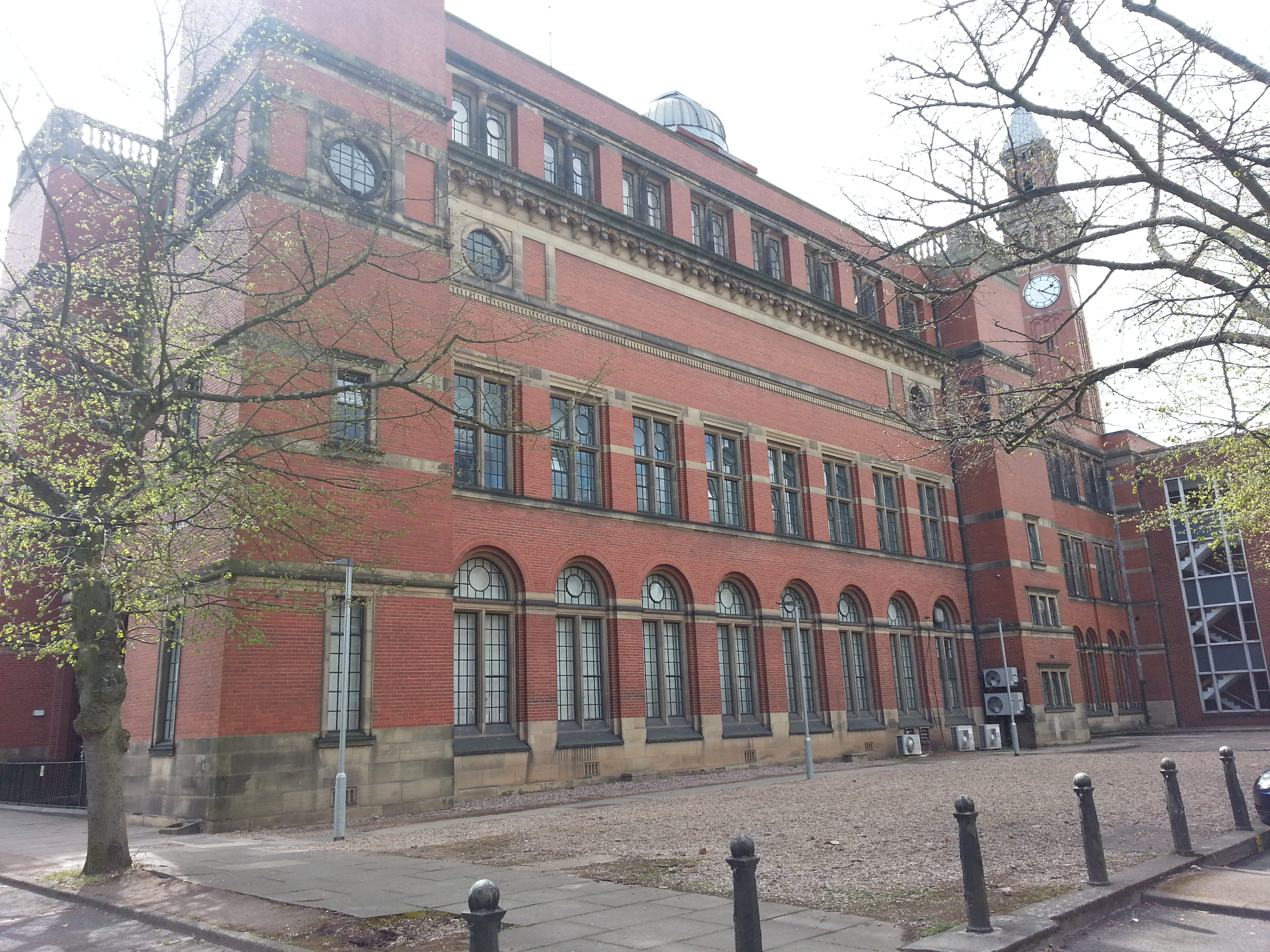
Birmingham University

J. Martin Brown graduated with a BSc degree in Physics from Birmingham University in England in 1963. He received an MSc in Radiation biology and physics from London University in 1965. He graduated with a DPhil in Cancer Biology from Oxford University in 1968.

Brown is Professor Emeritus of Radiation Oncology at Stanford University School of Medicine in the United States. He was Director of the Division of Radiation and Cancer Biology at Stanford University from 1984 to 2004. He was Director of the Graduate Program in Cancer Biology at Stanford from 1990 to 2002. Brown heads the J. Martin Brown Lab at Stanford University School of Medicine.

J. Martin Brown has received numerous honours and awards. The International Association for Radiation Research gave him the Henry S. Kaplan Distinguished Scientist Award in 2007. The British Association for Radiation Research awarded him the Weiss Medal in 2001. The Radiation Research Society gave him the Failla Memorial Award in 2000. He was awarded the Gold Medal of the American Society for Therapeutic Radiology and Oncology in 1999. He received the Bruce Cain Memorial Award from the American Association for Cancer Research in 1999.
