= Paul Ramsay (British philanthropist) =

British philanthropist

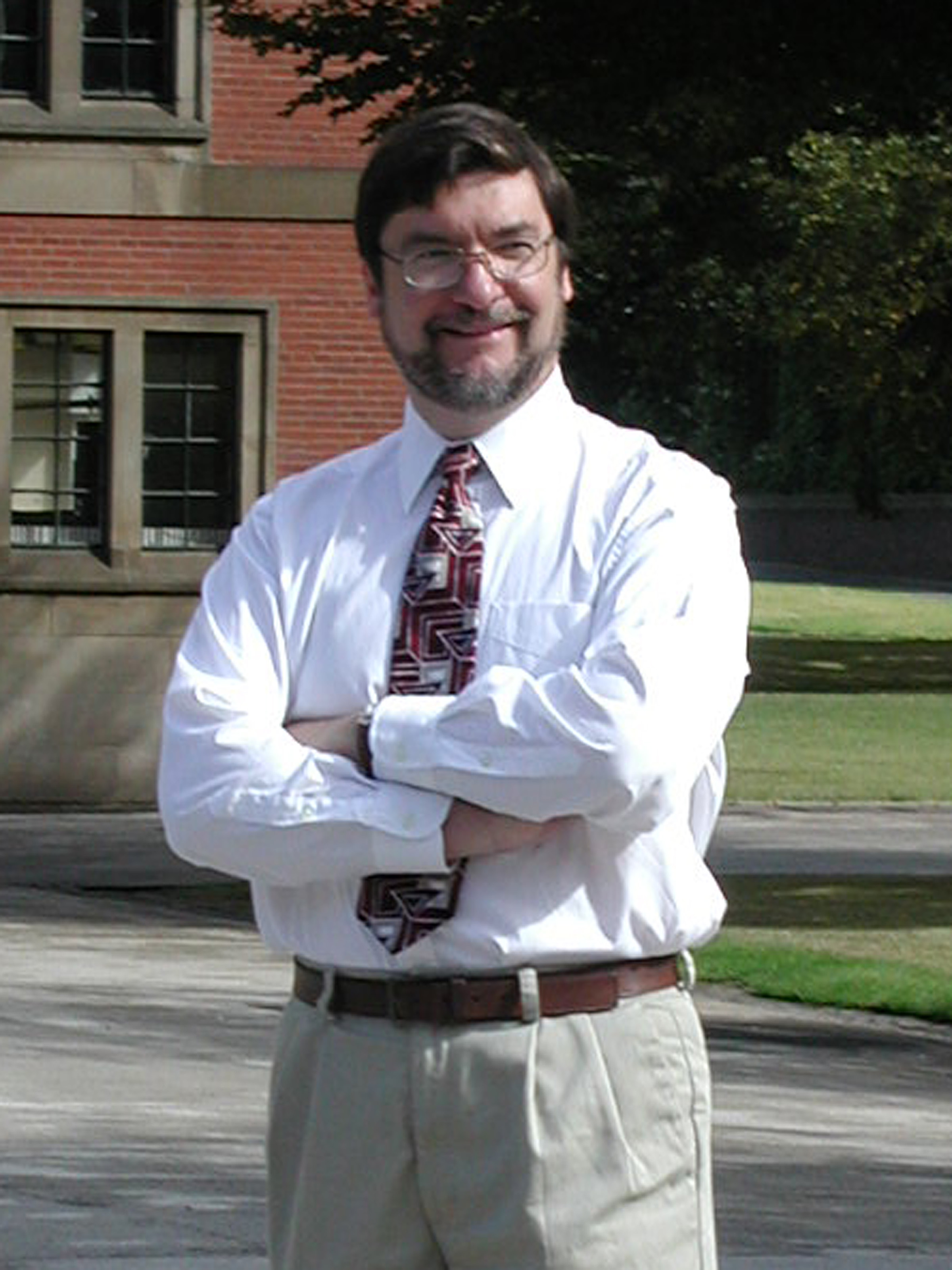
- Ramsay in 2003
- Born: 1953; Birmingham, England
- Education: University of Birmingham
- Occupation(s): Software Engineer, philanthropist
- Spouse: Yuanbi Su Ramsay

Paul Ramsay FRPSL is a United States-based British-born philanthropist and computer tycoon.

== Biography ==
Paul Ramsay was born in Birmingham, England. He graduated from Birmingham University with a BSc in Mathematics and Computer Science in 1975, an MSc in Computer Science in 1976, and a PhD in Computer Science in 1982. Ramsay worked for several computer companies after moving to California, United States, in 1983. Ramsay helped found US technology company Brocade Communications Systems in 1995.

=== Philanthropy ===
Ramsay and his wife Yuanbi, who is also a computer scientist, gave Birmingham University's School of Computer Science £1 million towards student bursaries and research. The Paul and Yuanbi Ramsay Bursaries are intended to encourage high-calibre students for whom financial considerations may prevent uptake of a place in the School of Computer Science. Paul and Yuanbi Ramsay were both appointed to the Chancellor's Guild of Benefactors at Birmingham University.

The Ramsays also set up the Paul and Yuanbi Ramsay Pediatric Endowed Fellowships at Stanford University's Child Health Research Institute in the United States, and support conservation of the ocean through the Leadership Council of the Packards' Circle at the Monterey Bay Aquarium giving the aquarium more than $1 million over the years.

=== Philately ===
After retiring from the technology industry, Ramsay continued to pursue his lifelong interest in philately. He joined the Great Britain Philatelic Society in 2007, publishing several articles in the Society's flagship magazine The GB Journal, and winning the Literature Field Award in 2016 for the most significant published work by a Society member in the field of GB Philately. From 2014 to 2020, he was editor of the Society's general information magazine The GBPS Newsletter. In 2021, he won the Harry Dagnall Award for a significant contribution to the Society.

Ramsay also joined the Royal Philatelic Society London as a member and was later elected a Fellow of the RPSL. In May 2018, he donated his collection of hand-painted envelopes to be auctioned by Spink on behalf of the RPSL. The auction raised £175,000 for the Tomorrow's Royal campaign.

== Publications ==
- ATOL, a simple language with powerful data structuring facilities (1979)
- A prototyping language for text-processing applications (1982)
- TRAP - Tax Reform Analysis Package (1983)
- A microcomputer-controlled apparatus for simultaneous measurement of exoelectron emission and thermoluminesence (1983)
- Silver Jubilee Booklet Interleaf Numbers (2013)
- Coloured Advertisements in British Stamp Booklets (2013)
- Ford’s Blotting Paper in British Stamp Booklets (2013)
- Air Mail Panes in British Stamp Booklets (2013)
- Dubarry Advertisements in British Stamp Booklets (2015)
- George V Perforations on Photogravure Definitive Booklets and Rolls (2016)
- Postage and Telegraph Dies of De La Rue from the Inland Revenue Records (2021)
- The Struggle Behind Britain’s National Health Stamps (2023)
- The £sd Postage Stamps of Great Britain Issued in Booklets (2012)
- The Post Office Telegraph Stamps of Great Britain (2014)
- The £sd Postage Stamps of Great Britain Issued in Rolls (2015)
- The Postage Due Stamps of Great Britain (2018)
- Postage dues (2022)
