= Concy Aciro =

Ugandan politician

- Education: International Development Department of Birmingham University (MSc in Poverty Reduction and Development Management)
- Occupation: politician
- Known for: Her involvement in the national peace talks between the government and the Lord's Resistance Army to resolve the conflict in northern Uganda; Formation of a football league to help reintegrate former child soldiers and to build unity between refugee camps.; Donations of football kits from British football clubs
- Awards: University of Birmingham's Alumna of the Year in 2008

Concy Aciro is a Ugandan politician. When aged ten Concy Aciro was abducted by the Lord's Resistance Army in northern Uganda to be trained as a fighter. She was faced with considerable hardship after managing to escape. Aciro graduated from the International Development Department of Birmingham University with an MSc in Poverty Reduction and Development Management in 2007. Aciro was named the University of Birmingham's Alumna of the Year in 2008.

She graduated from University of Birmingham. She became an opposition MP in the Ugandan Parliament. Aciro was involved in peace negotiations and reconstruction work. She was involved in national peace talks between the government and the Lord's Resistance Army to resolve the conflict in northern Uganda. Aciro was responsible for the formation of a football league to help reintegrate former child soldiers and to build unity between refugee camps. She secured donations of football kits from British football clubs. Aciro was Amuru District Women's Representative in the Ugandan Parliament. She is a member of the Forum for Democratic Change party, which was in opposition to President Yoweri Museveni.
