= John Campbell (casting scientist) =

British engineer

John Campbell FREng OBE
- Born: 1938 (age 87–88)
- Citizenship: British
- Education: University of Cambridge; University of Sheffield; University of Birmingham
- Known for: Leading expert in casting technology; ~150 papers and 20 patents
- Scientific career
- Fields: Casting technology, materials engineering
- Workplaces: University of Birmingham

John Campbell FREng OBE (born 1938) is a British engineer and one of the world's leading experts in the casting industry with approximately 150 papers, and 20 patents.

Campbell holds two Master's degrees from University of Cambridge and University of Sheffield, as well as two doctorates from University of Birmingham. He is a fellow of the Royal Academy of Engineering, and he was appointed to the chair of casting technology at University of Birmingham. The Institute of Cast Metals Engineers has named the "John Campbell Medal" after him.
