= Vicki Paterson =

British head teacher

Dame Vicki Ann Paterson DBE is a British head teacher. Paterson was Executive Head of the Brindishe Schools, a federation of three Ofsted-outstanding state maintained, local authority, community primary schools (Brindishe Lee School, Brindishe Green School and Brindishe Manor School) in Lewisham, South East London until August 2018. She was a Consultant Leader with the National College, a National Leader in Education, senior partner and Non-Executive Director of the national social justice charity ‘Challenge Partners’. She is currently a Justice of the Peace in Suffolk Criminal and Family Courts and sits on Independent Review Panels for School Exclusions and Appeals.

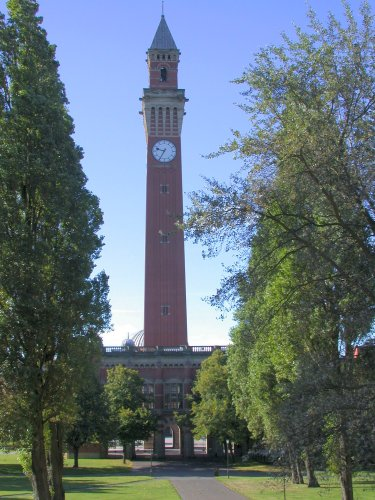
University of Birmingham

She graduated from the University of Birmingham with a BEd degree in Education in 1978, and earned an MBA (Ed) degree at London South Bank University.

== Honours ==
She was appointed Dame Commander of the Order of the British Empire (DBE) in the 2013 New Year Honours for services to Education.
