= Timeline of strikes in 2015 =

Strikes in 2015

A number of labour strikes, labour disputes, and other industrial actions occurred in 2015.

== Background ==
A labour strike is a work stoppage caused by the mass refusal of employees to work. This can include wildcat strikes, which are done without union authorisation, and slowdown strikes, where workers reduce their productivity while still carrying out minimal working duties. It is usually a response to employee grievances, such as low pay or poor working conditions. Strikes can also occur to demonstrate solidarity with workers in other workplaces or pressure governments to change policies.

== Timeline ==
=== Continuing strikes from 2014 ===
- 2013–15 Crown Holdings strike. 22-month strike by Crown Holdings factory workers in Canada.
- 2014–15 FairPoint Communications strike. 4-month strike by FairPoint Communications workers in the United States.
- 2014–15 NI Water strike. 5-week strike by Northern Ireland Water workers over pensions.
- 2014–2016 Oromo protests
- 2014–15 Serbian teachers' strikes. Wave of strikes by primary and secondary school teachers in Serbia.
- 2014–15 Shenzhen Artigas Clothing strikes. Two strikes, one in December 2014 and one in June 2015, by Shenzhen Artigas Clothing workers in China over planned relocation of the factory.

=== January ===
- 2015 taxi strikes in China. Strikes by taxi drivers in China over franchise fees and competition from ride-sharing apps.
- 2015 Edo State judicial strike. 6-month strike by judicial workers in Edo State, Nigeria.
- 2015 Kenya teachers' strikes. Two strikes by teachers in Kenya over a pay dispute, a 2-week strike in mid-January a 1-month strike in September.
- 2015 Polish miners' strike. 2-week strike by coal miners in Poland.
- 2015 Trayer strike. Months-long strike by Trayer Engineering sheet metal workers in the United States over unionisation.
- 2015 UADY strike. 25-day strike by administrative and manual staff of the Autonomous University of Yucatan in Mexico over wages.

=== February ===
- 2015 Gabon public sector strike. Strike by public sector workers in Gabon.
- 2015 Instafab strike. 20+ month strike by Instafab construction workers in the United States over unfair labour practises.
- 2015 Israel Chemicals strike. 4-month strike by ICL Group Ltd. workers in Israel over redundancies.
- 2015 Mauritanian miners' strike. 2-month strike started by iron miners in Zouérat.
- 2015 Norwegian Air strike. 11-day strike by Norwegian Air Shuttle pilots.
- 2015 Rea Vaya strike. 6-week strike by Rea Vaya bus drivers in South Africa.
- 2015 United Steel Workers Oil Refinery strike
- 2015 University of Guyana strike. 5-week strike by University of Guyana staff over wages.
- 2015 University of Toronto strike. 1-month strike by University of Toronto graduate student workers.

=== March ===
- 2015 Medupi strike. 8-week strike by workers at the Medupi Power Station in South Africa.
- 2015 Movistar strike. Strike by Movistar telecommunications workers in Spain.
- 2015 Pou Yuen Vietnam strike. 7-day strike by Pou Yuen Vietnam textile workers over social insurance cover.
- 2015–2016 Quebec protests
- 2015 San Quintín strike. 2-month strike by farm workers in San Quintín, Baja California, Mexico.
- 2015 São Paulo teachers strike. 3-month strike by teachers in São Paulo, Brazil, over wages.
- 2015 Stella Footwear strike. Strike by Stella Footwear factory workers in China.

=== April ===
- 2015 Bihar teachers strike. 5-week strike by contract teachers in Bihar, India, for equal pay with permanent teachers.
- 2015 Colombian teachers' strike. 2-week strike by teachers in Colombia.
- 2015 London inside workers strike. 8-week strike by municipal inside workers in London, Ontario, Canada.
- 2015 Tourah Cement strike. 6-week strike by Tourah Cement Company workers in Egypt over annual profits.

=== May ===
- 2015 Argentinian oilseed strike. 4-week strike by oilseed crushers in Argentina over wages.
- 2015 Delta State local government strike. 2-month strike by local government civil servants in Delta State, Nigeria, over unpaid wages.
- 2015 Iran Barak strike. 1+ month strike by Iran Barak textile workers in Rasht, Iran, over unpaid wages.
- May–June 2015 Turkish autoworkers strikes. Wave of wildcat strikes in the Turkish automobile industry, protesting against perceived collaboration between their union and companies.

=== June ===
- 2015 AFFCO lockout. 5-month lockout imposed by AFFCO Holdings in New Zealand after its workers refused to abandon collective bargaining.
- 2015 Chilean teachers' strike. es. 7-week strike by teachers in Chile over proposed education reforms.
- 2015 Ecuadorian protests, including a general strike.
- 2015 FTII strike. 139-day strike by Film and Television Institute of India students over the appointment of Gajendra Chauhan as chair of the governing council.

=== July ===
- 2015 Nepal recruitment agencies strike. 18-day strike by recruitment agencies against the Free Visa, Free Ticket policy.

=== August ===
- 2015 Ghanaian doctors' strike. 3-week strike by doctors in Ghana over working conditions.

=== September ===
- 2015 Australia women's national soccer team strike, 2-month strike by Australia women's national soccer team players.
- 2015 Munnar Plantation strike, 9-day strike by women workers at the Munnar Kannan Devan Hills Plantations Limited, Kerala.

=== October ===
- 2015 São Paulo student protests. pt. Protests, including strikes, by secondary school students in São Paulo, Brazil, over proposed restructuring of the secondary education system.
- Stethoscope Revolution, in Morocco.

=== November ===
- 2015 Kohler strike
- 2015–16 MV Portland dispute. 2-month dispute between crew of the MV Portland and Alcoa after Alcoa announced that it would be selling the ship and sacking the crew.
- 2015 Romanian protests
- 2015 South African parliamentary staff strike. 4-week strike by parliamentary staff in South Africa.
- 2015 Tongaat Hullet strike. 1-month strike by Tongaat Hullet sugar workers in Zimbabwe.

=== December ===
- 2015 Chicago Coca-Cola strike. 1-month strike by Coca-Cola workers in Chicago, United States.

== Statistics ==
According to the Office for National Statistics, the number of working days lost to strikes in the UK in 2015 was the second-lowest per year since 1891, largely due to a wave of public sectors having occurred earlier in 2014. According to the Bureau of Labor Statistics, there were twelve major work stoppages (involving at least 1000 workers) in the United States in 2015. According to Employment and Social Development Canada, there were 61 work stoppages in Canada in 2015, almost all in the public sector, with around 80% of the working days lost occurring in Québec.
