= Health in Morocco =

Life expectancy at birth in Morocco

Morocco became an independent country in 1956. At that time there were only 400 private practitioners and 300 public health physicians in the entire country. By 1992, the government had thoroughly improved the healthcare service and quality. Healthcare was made available to over 70% of the population. Programs and courses to teach health and hygiene have been introduced to inform parents and children on how to correctly care for their own and their families' health.

The first healthcare policy in Morocco was devised in 1959, with the majority of the free healthcare services and management focused on the general public. The State provides funding and administration. The Ministry of Health runs the National Institutes and Laboratories, Basic Care Health Network and the hospital network. The Defence Department owns and runs its own hospitals, and local governments run city health services.

The healthcare system is made up of AMO (Mandatory Health Insurance). AMO is split into two sections: CNSS (private) and CNOPS (public). There is also RAMED, a health insurance program designed to support the low socioeconomic population against financial stresses due to health-related issues.

The Moroccan health care system has four layers, the first being "primary healthcare". This includes clinics, health centres and local hospitals for public healthcare, and infirmaries and medical offices for private healthcare. The second section includes provincial and prefectural hospitals for public health, and specialised clinics and offices for private health. The third area includes hospitals in all major cities, and the fourth includes university hospitals. These centres have the most advanced equipment.

== Background ==
Health care services in Morocco have evolved in line with the country’s epidemiological transition, facilitated by heightened surveillance of health-related conditions and the maturing role carried out by the private sector. Developments have evolved in line with the objectives outlined in the country’s long-term strategy, Vision 2020. Implemented in 2006, the strategy aims at achieving an efficient health care system by 2020. In its 2012-16 phase, reforms have aimed primarily at consolidating past gains but also addressing new needs, with a particular focus on restructuring emergency services, promoting family medicine, developing rural health care, extending national coverage schemes and human resource development. Morocco is facing an exodus of its qualified doctors to Europe, particularly France. The basic mandatory health insurance system is regulated by the National Health Insurance Agency (Morocco) (ANAM).

== Health status ==
=== Diseases ===
Morocco has also made significant strides in reducing the prevalence of infectious diseases, and has eradicated polio, trachoma and malaria, thanks to a variety of programmes to raise awareness on how to treat and prevent communicable illnesses, in addition to expanded vaccination campaigns and the introduction of new medicines into the market. Though largely under control, diseases such as hepatitis are still prevalent and efforts are under way to curb the number of affected patients.

An even greater priority for the sector is non-communicable diseases. According to a recent study conducted by the Ministry of Health (Ministère de la Santé, MS) and the WHO, non-communicable diseases account for 75% of deaths, such as cardiovascular diseases (34%), diabetes (12%) and cancer (11%). Improved longevity – with life expectancy increasing from an average 49.3 years in 1962 to 70.6 in 2012 – and changes in lifestyle and eating habits have meant that such diseases have been on the rise in the past few decades, claiming today three out of every four deaths in Morocco.

=== Obesity ===
Share of adults that are obese in different countries in the Middle East and North Africa, 1975 to 2016

Adolescent girls are at a greater risk of becoming obese. Obesity is linked to a greater availability of food, particularly from the West, and an increasingly sedentary lifestyle in urban areas. A woman who has a low level of schooling or no education in urban areas is significantly more likely to be obese. The general public is not aware of the medical conditions that result from obesity. Rather, female fatness is embraced, as it "is viewed as a sign of social status and is a cultural symbol of beauty, fertility, and prosperity". Being thin is a sign of sickness or poverty.

=== Maternal and child health care ===
Maternal health care in particular has improved significantly over the past 10 years, with the maternal mortality ratio dropping from 227 deaths per 100,000 live births to 112, and infant mortality declining from 40 deaths per 1000 live births to 30.2, according to the World Health Organization (WHO). This can in large part be attributed to efforts targeting better access to maternal and child health care services, as well as increased awareness on the necessity to seek medical assistance throughout pregnancy and after.

In 2007 the Ministry of Health recognised the problem of maternal and child mortality. This led the ministry to implement the Maternal Mortality Strategy action plan of 2008–12, whose aim was to reduce the maternal mortality rate (MMR) from 227 to 50 deaths per 100,000 births. There were three points of improvement to help them try to achieve their goal. The first was to reduce any barriers preventing women from accessing emergency services. The second was to enhance the health care quality and the third was to improve governance. The Ministry of Health also began the maternal mortality surveillance system. This allowed them to collect and analyse data in 2009 which discovered that the goal of reducing the MMR to 50 would not be achievable by 2015. Because of this information, a new action plan for 2012-16 was introduced to reinforce management and target specific actions for rural and disadvantaged areas.

=== Nutrition ===
Over the last 20 years nutrition has significantly changed with rapid changes due to demographic characteristics of the region, speedy urbanisation and social development of steady and significant economic growth. Morocco and the Middle East have the highest amount of excessive dietary energy intake. With a low rate of 4% of poverty prevalence and 19% of child malnutrition, Morocco has an 8% rate of child malnutrition. All these changes have significantly contributed to the dietary and physical activity of individuals living in the Middle East, reflecting changes with nutrition and the prevalence of these changes.

=== Hospitals ===
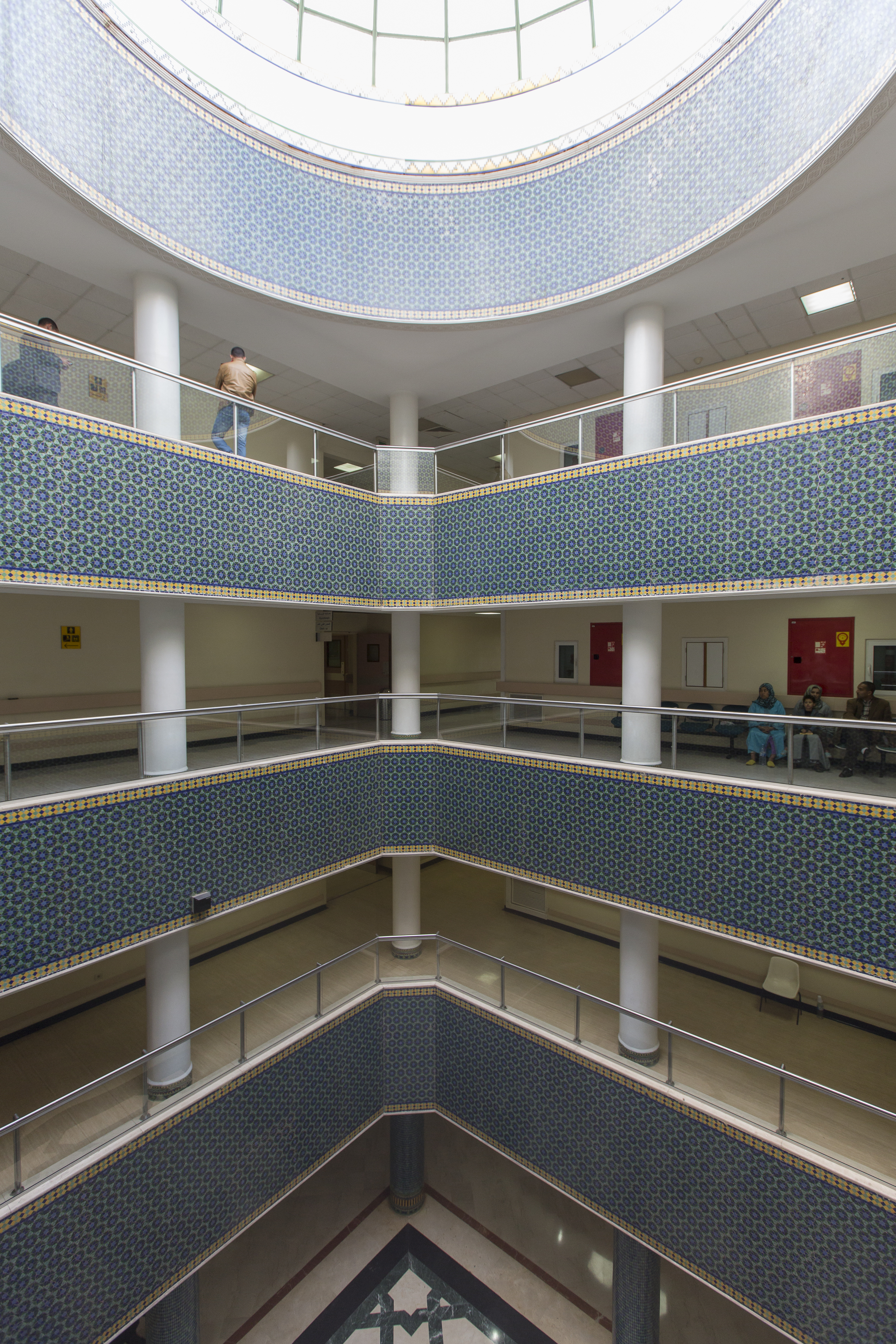
Cheikh Khalifa Bin Zayed Al Nahyan Hospital (CHU), Rabat

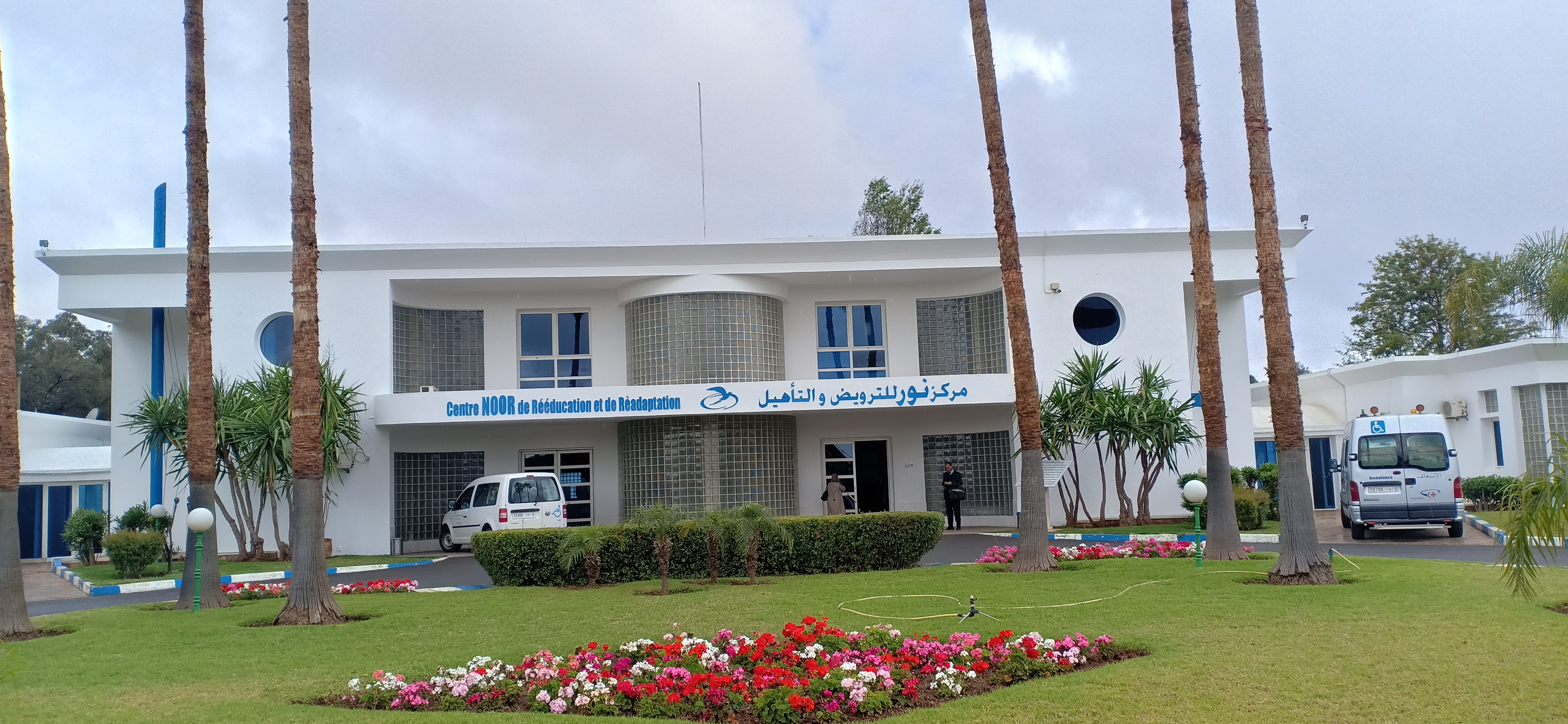
Noor Rehabilitation and Rehabilitation Hospital Center

There were 534 hospitals in Morocco in 2020. Only 33 of these hospitals provided tertiary care services in 2020. In 2019, there were 20 inter-regional hospitals, 4 university psychiatry hospitals, 18 regional hospitals, 2 regional psychiatry hospitals, 7 oncology centers, 73 provincial hospitals, 4 provincial psychiatry hospitals, and 31 local hospitals. Hospitals in Morocco include the following: The construction of new university hospitals (CHUs) in Rabat and Laayoune is managed by the National Agency for Public Facilities .

Hospitals in Morocco
Name	City/Province	Region	Coordinates	Ref
Agadir Hassan II Hospital	Agadir	Souss-Massa	30.437982203123937°N 9.590433756033558°W	
Béni Mellal-Khénifra Central Regional Hospital	Beni Mellal	Béni Mellal-Khénifra	32.572724597024454°N 6.398062599889866°W	
Ben Sergao- Dcheira Military Hospital	Agadir, Inezgane	Souss-Massa	30.38884104396505°N 9.551511294189035°W	
Benslimane Provincial Hospital	Benslimane, Benslimane Province	Casablanca-Settat	33.673488745071744°N 7.132910951457474°W	
Cheikh Khalifa Bin Zayed Al Nahyan Hospital (CHU)	Oujda	Oriental	33.55261347542982°N 7.66783561836534°W	
Hassan II Hospital (CHU)	Fes	Fès-Meknès	31.66976814143106°N 7.996794145555486°W	
Ibn Nafis Hospital	Marrakesh	Marrakesh-Safi	31.662437751562813°N 7.996411604940558°W	
Ibn-Rochd Hospital (CHU)	Casablanca	Casablanca-Settat	33.5814903740638°N 7.619776832345588°W	
Ibn Sina Hospital	Rabat	Rabat-Salé-Kénitra	33.99184677567052°N 6.850571484523994°W	
Ibn Sina Military Hospital	Marrakesh	Marrakesh-Safi	31.63635760307791°N 8.021252401896147°W	
Ibn Tofail University Hospital	Marrakesh	Marrakesh-Safi	31.642097993541228°N 8.015807347763289°W	
Khénifra Grand Hospital	Khénifra, Khénifra Province	Béni Mellal-Khénifra	33.012685671921346°N 5.647010073356986°W	
Lala Khadija Hospital	Tamallalt, El Kelâa des Sraghna Province	Marrakesh-Safi	32.0620779152004°N 7.573599739705045°W	
Mohammed V Hospital	Meknès	Fès-Meknès	35.783669197628974°N 5.826141261275841°W	
Mohammad V Hospital Safi	Safi, Safi Province	Marrakesh-Safi	32.42266361297888°N 9.253123844087371°W	
Mohammad V Hospital (CHU)	Rabat	Rabat-Salé-Kénitra	33.59311152717211°N 7.553295352462275°W	
Mohammed V Military Training Hospital	Rabat	Rabat-Salé-Kénitra	33.972682729544076°N 6.871470662064285°W	
Mohammed VI Hospital (CHU) Marrakesh	Marrakesh	Marrakesh-Safi	35.756927368087965°N 5.82923116594475°W	
Moulay Abdellah Hospital	Mohammedia	Casablanca-Settat	33.74888491061149°N 7.382849912093318°W	
Moulay Ismail Military Hospital	Meknes	Fès-Meknès	33.888993855031764°N 5.523389518353267°W	
Moulay Jousseph Hospital	Rabat	Rabat-Salé-Kénitra	34.01215748781727°N 6.861901355739361°W	
Noor Rehabilitation and Rehabilitation Hospital Center	Bouskoura	Casablanca-Settat	33.47798205460943°N 7.639056131858797°W	
Sheikh Khalifa Ben Zayed Al-Nahyane Hospital	Casablanca	Casablanca-Settat	33.55256876950521°N 7.667803432346762°W	largest hospital with 205 beds
Sidi Mohamed Ben Abdellah Hospital	Essaouira	Marrakesh-Safi	31.514554088250538°N 9.764276305771238°W	
Sidi Hssain Benaceur Hospital	Ouarzazate, Ouarzazate Province	Drâa-Tafilalet	30.925551364133867°N 6.917321903110498°W	
Timahdite Hospital	Timahdite, Ifrane Province	Fès-Meknès	33.5202082263248°N 5.108679974192452°W	
Toundoute Hospital	Toundoute, Ouarzazate Province	Drâa-Tafilalet	31.520472768249963°N 6.694693451028117°W	

=== Life expectancy ===
As of 2024 the life expectancy at birth in Morocco is 76.4 years, 74.7 years for men and 78.1 years for women.

== See also ==
- The Stethoscope Revolution (Morocco)
- Arabic Wikipedia: Health in Morocco
- List of hospitals in Africa
