= Geoffrey Ball =

Geoffrey Ball may refer to:

- Geoffrey Vernon Ball (1926–2015), British professor of ophthalmics
- Geoffrey R. Ball (born 1964), American physiologist and inventor
