= Asif Ahmed (scientist) =

British-Indian vascular scientist

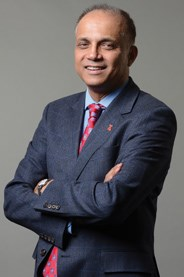
- Asif Ahmed at the Aston University in 2016
- Education: King's College London; University College London
- Scientific career
- Fields: Preeclampsia
- Workplaces: Aston University; University of Southampton; University of Edinburgh; University of Birmingham; Stanford University; University of Cambridge
- Thesis: Platelet abnormalities in cardiopulmonary bypass surgery (1989)
- Doctoral advisors: Paul Salmon; Michael Hobsley
- Other academic advisors: Stephen Kevin Smith; Robert H. Michell

Asif Ahmed FRSB is a British-Indian vascular scientist, whose research focuses on reducing the risk of mortality and morbidity in pregnancy. He is the founder and former Pro-Vice-Chancellor and Executive Dean of Aston Medical School, Birmingham, and established the Aston Medical Research Institute, a university-wide multidisciplinary translational research entity at Aston University.

== Education and career ==
Asif Ahmed went to a local comprehensive Aylward School in North London and was subsequently educated at King's College London where he gained his undergraduate degree in pharmacology. He was awarded a Ph.D. for his work on platelet abnormalities in cardiopulmonary bypass surgery from University College London in 1989.

From 1989 to 1993, he was a Postdoctoral Research Fellow at the University of Cambridge and went on to work at The University of Birmingham, being promoted to Professor of Reproductive Physiology in 1998. From 2009 to 2011 he was a visiting professor at Stanford University School of Medicine.

He held the Inaugural Gustav Born Chair of Vascular Biology and was appointed as the Assistant Principal for International Postdoctoral Training at the University of Edinburgh in 2010. Ahmed joined Aston University as the first Pro-Vice-Chancellor for Health in October 2012. He was elected as a Fellow of the Royal Society of Biology in 2013.

As of 2021, he is Senior Advisor to the President and Vice-Chancellor at the University of Southampton.

== Research ==
Ahmed's laboratory has studied vascular growth factors in pregnancy and preeclampsia. Research topics include the enzyme placental heme oxygenase (HO), carbon monoxide (CO), and soluble Flt-1.
