= Adel Hassan Al A'ali =

Bahraini businessman

- Born: 1957 (age 68–69)
- Education: Bachelor of Business Administration from Aston University in Birmingham, Executive Education program from Stanford Graduate School of Business
- Occupation: business
- Board member of: Hajj Hassan Group (Chair and CEO), Ibn Al-Nafees Hospital (Chairman), Dar Al-Wasat Company for Publishing and Distribution, Bahrain Chamber of Commerce and Industry (two terms

Adel Hassan Al A'ali (Arabic: عادل حسن العالي; born in 1957) is a Bahraini businessman. In 2018, he was appointed chair of the construction firm Haji Hassan Group.

== Early life and education ==
He obtained a Bachelor of Business Administration degree from Aston University in Birmingham, United Kingdom, in 1981. He graduated from the Executive Education program at the Stanford Graduate School of Business in 1998.

== Career ==
He is a member of the boards of directors of the following companies:

- Hajj Hassan Group (chair and CEO)
- Ibn Al-Nafees Hospital (chair)
- Dar Al-Wasat Company for Publishing and Distribution
- Bahrain Chamber of Commerce and Industry (two consecutive terms)
- Al-Ahlia Insurance Company (Vice-chair)
- United Insurance Company
- United Cement Company
- Bahrain Precast Concrete Company
- Bahrain Businessmen's Association (2001)
- Supreme Council for Vocational Training

He worked extensively in economic research projects on subjects such as vocational training and management systems (including computerization) in the contracting sector.

== 2011 protests ==
In 2011, in the wake of the Bahraini uprising of 2011, the Bahrain Mirror site stated that the executive director of the Chamber of Commerce, Ebrahim Langawi, forged a resignation letter from Al A’ali. An internal investigation committee headed by Dr. Taqi Al Zeera confirmed the forgery was for purely sectarian reasons, and Al A’ali's membership was reinstated.
