= Asif Ahmed =

Asif Ahmed may refer to:

- Asif Ahmed (cricketer, born 1992), Bangladeshi cricketer
- Asif Ahmed (cricketer, born 1942), Pakistani cricketer
- Asif Ahmed (academic), British vascular and obstetric scientist
- Asif Ahmed, fictional character portrayed by Akshay Kumar in the 2020 Indian film Laxmii

== See also ==
- Asif Ahmad (born 1956), British diplomat
- Asif Ahmad (politician), Indian politician
