= Rūta =

Female given name

Rūta is a common Lithuanian and Latvian female given name.

People with the given name include:

- Rūta Bunkutė (born 1979), fitness competitor
- Rūta Gajauskaitė (born 1989), Lithuanian figure skater
- Ruta Gerulaitis (born 1955), American tennis player
- Rūta Jokubonienė (1930–2010), Lithuanian textile artist
- Rūta Meilutytė (born 1997), Lithuanian swimmer
- Rūta Paškauskienė (born 1977), Lithuanian table tennis player
- Rūta Ščiogolevaitė-Damijonaitienė (born 1981), Lithuanian singer
- Rūta Šepetys (born 1967), Lithuanian-American writer
- Rūta Skujiņa (1907–1964), Latvian poet
- Rūta Vanagaitė (born 1955), Lithuanian theatre critic, writer, journalist and historian

== See also ==
- Rūta Society, a Lithuanian cultural society active in 1909–1914
- Rūta (chocolate), a Lithuanian chocolate brand existing since 2013
- Ruta (disambiguation)
