= Viswas Raghavan =

Indian American Investment banker

- Born: Viswas Raghavan; September 1966 (age 60); India
- Education: University of Bombay (BA); Aston University (BA)
- Employer: Citigroup
- Website: citigroup.com/vis-raghavan

Viswas "Vis" Raghavan is an Indian American investment banker who has served as the head of banking at Citigroup since 2024. He was previously global co-head of investment banking at J.P. Morgan from 2020 to 2024, briefly becoming sole head before departing to Citi. At J.P. Morgan, Raghavan specialized in equity and debt capital market transactions.

== Early life and education ==
Raghavan was born in September 1966 and raised in India. He attended the University of Bombay and graduated with a degree in physics before earning a dual degree in electronic engineering and computer science from Aston University.

== Career ==
Raghavan began his career at Lehman Brothers during the late-1990s. He joined J.P. Morgan in 2000, where he began work in the firm's equity-linked and derivatives capital market businesses for Europe and Asia. Based in London, he held several senior positions, including head of international capital markets and global head of equity capital markets.

He joined Citigroup in 2024 at the request of Citi CEO Jane Fraser. Tasked with leading Citi's firm-wide investment, commercial, and corporate banking, the bank offered him a $40 million recruitment package. Raghavan orchestrated a highly publicized recruitment spree from J.P. Morgan's investment bank to Citi throughout 2025. Raghavan brought about 15 senior executives to Citi and focused on improving teamwork between divisions and strengthening its M&A business. He is seen as a potential successor to Fraser as CEO of the bank.

== Personal life ==
Raghavan is married with four children. He lives in the Chelsea neighhood in New York City. He follows professional cricket.

== See also ==
- History of J.P. Morgan & Co.
- List of University of Bombay people
