= John Sunderland (businessman) =

British businessman

Sir John Michael Sunderland, CBE FRSA (born 24 August 1945) is a British businessman, who was President of the Confederation of British Industry from 2004 to 2006, where his priority was restoring confidence in business after a series of corporate scandals. He is the current Chancellor of Aston University.

== Early life ==
John Sunderland was born on 24 August 1945. His father was Harry Sunderland and his mother, Joyce Farnish, and sister Ann Marie.

Sunderland earned a master of arts degree from the University of St Andrews.

== Career ==
Sunderland joined Cadbury Limited in 1968. He worked on both the confectionery and soft drinks sides of the business, on the Boards of Cadbury Ireland, Cadbury Schweppes South Africa, as a founding Director of the Coca-Cola Schweppes joint venture in 1987, and then as Managing Director of Trebor Bassett. In 1993, he became Managing Director of the Confectionery Stream and a member of the Cadbury Schweppes Board. In September 1996, he was appointed Chief Executive and seven years later, he became Chairman. He retired in 2008 from his post as non-executive chairman of Cadbury Schweppes and was previously the company's Chief Executive from 1996 to 2003. He is a Fellow of the Royal Society of Arts and was knighted in the Queen's Birthday Honours 2006, for services to business . He was appointed Chancellor of Aston University, Birmingham, in 2010, and serves as a Non-Executive Director on the Barclays board. He is a Director of the Financial Reporting Council, an Adviser to CVC Capital Partners, an Association Member of BUPA and a Governor of Reading University.

On 3 July 2008, he returned to his old school to present the prizes on Foundation Day. In a short address, he claimed not to have any "words of wisdom", but later went on to encourage pupils to defy the impossible and defy authority on the road to success. In a short anecdote, he reminded pupils that his headmaster had, in a school report, called him "a distinctly average boy". In turn this led him to doubt nominal authority.

On 25 November 2010, Sunderland became the new Chancellor of Aston University, and was officially installed at a lavish ceremony on 4 May 2011, attended by Julia King (Vice-Chancellor of Aston University) and many other local and academic dignitaries.

Sir John is currently Chairman of Merlin Entertainments Group, a non-Executive Director of Barclays plc, a non-Executive Director of AFC Energy PLC, a Director of the Financial Reporting Council, an adviser to CVC Capital Partners, an Association Member of BUPA, and a member of Council at Reading University. Until his appointment as Chancellor, he was also a member of Council at Aston. He has held a number of Presidencies of trade bodies, including the Confederation of British Industry, the Chartered Management Institute, the Incorporated Society of British Advertisers and the UK Food and Drink Federation. He is a former non-Executive Director of the Rank Group plc and a Fellow of the Royal Society of Arts.

== See also ==
- Confederation of British Industry

Academic offices
Preceded by Michael Bett	Chancellor of Aston University; November 2010–present	Succeeded by Incumbent
