= Simon D'Ujanga =

Ugandan politician

- Born: 24 August 1953 (age 73); Uganda
- Citizenship: Uganda
- Education: Makerere University (BSc in Electrical Engineering); Aston University (MSc in Electrical Engineering)
- Occupations: Electrical Engineer & Politician
- Years active: 1994–present
- Known for: Politics
- Title: State Minister for Energy

Simon Giw D'Ujanga is a Ugandan electrical engineer and politician. He is the current State Minister for Energy in the Ugandan Cabinet. He was appointed to that position on 1 June 2006. In the cabinet reshuffle of 16 February 2009, and that of 27 May 2011, he retained his cabinet post. On account of his ministerial position, he is also an ex-offico Member of Parliament (MP).

== Background ==
He was born in Zombo District, on 24 August 1953.

== Education ==
He holds a degree of Bachelor of Science in Electrical Engineering from Makerere University, Uganda's oldest university, established in 1922. He also holds the degree of Master of Science in the same field, from Aston University, in Birmingham, in the United Kingdom. He also holds other professional qualifications and memberships in the field of electrical engineering and law.

== Work experience ==
Simon D'Ujanga served as the deputy managing director of the now defunct Uganda Electricity Board, the government-owned electrical utility company, from 1994 until 1997. From 1997 until 1998, he served as its managing director. In 2001, he entered politics, contesting for the parliamentary seat of Okoro County, Nebbi District. He won. He was re-elected in 2006. On 1 June 2006, he was appointed State Minister for Energy, a position that he still holds in 2014. In 2010, "Okoro County" was removed from Nebbi District and renamed the newly created Zombo District. During the 2011 National elections, D'Ujanga lost the primaries to the incumbent MP, Stanley Oribudhou Omwonya, also of the National Resistance Movement political party.

== Personal information ==
Simon D'Ujanga is married. He belongs to the National Resistance Movement political party. He lists aviation, as one of his special interests.

== See also ==
- Parliament of Uganda
- Cabinet of Uganda
- Zombo District
