= Rahul Potluri =

Indian origin British physician and researcher

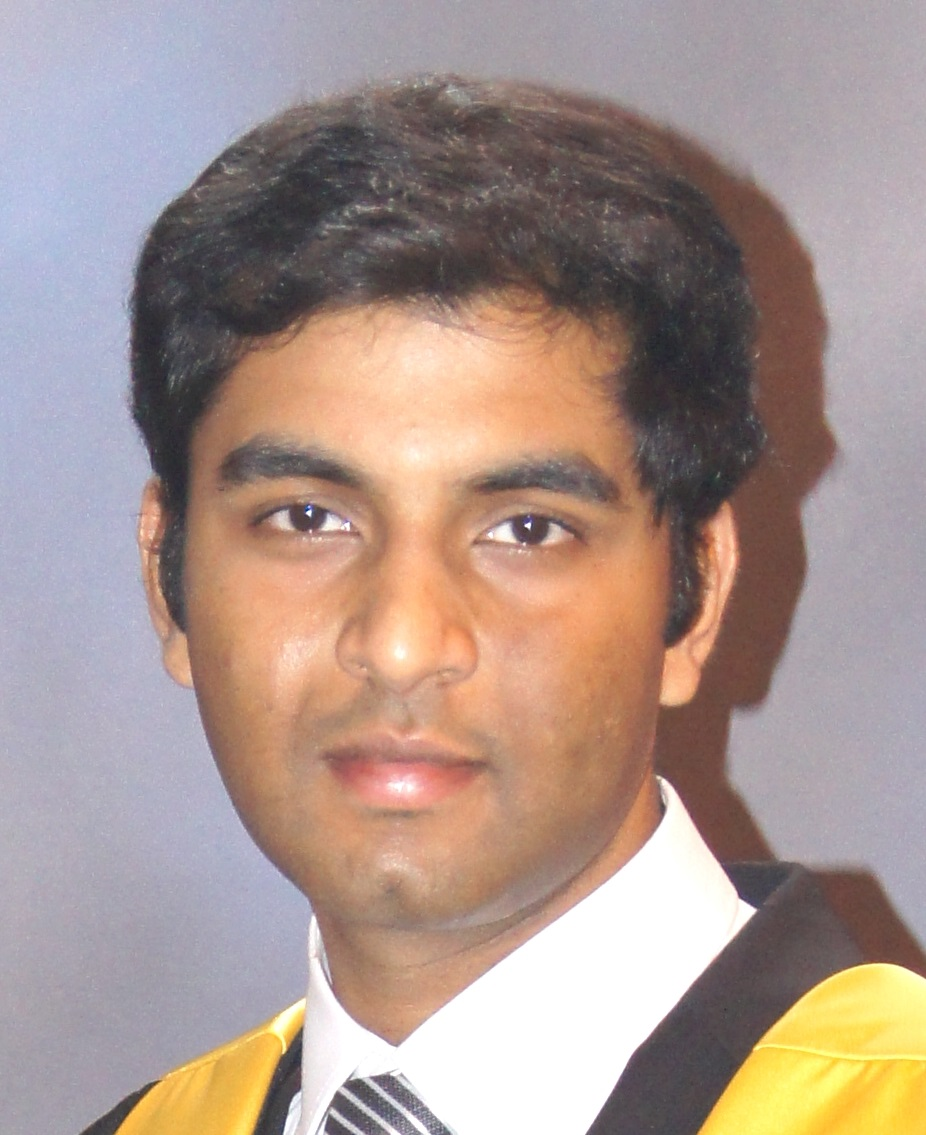
- Rahul Potluri
- Born: 19 December 1983 (age 42); Vijayawada, Andhra Pradesh, India
- Education: Aston Medical School, Aston University, University of Manchester, University of Birmingham
- Occupations: Doctor, scientific researcher
- Organizations: ACALM (Algorithm for Comorbidities, Associations, Length of stay and Mortality) Study Unit

Rahul Potluri (born 19 December 1983) is a British physician, researcher and founder of ACALM (Algorithm for Comorbidites, Associations, Length of stay and Mortality) Study Unit, United Kingdom (UK). His clinical epidemiology research unit is one of the first to use big data in healthcare and medical research. His work has shown for the first time a link between high cholesterol and breast cancer. Further research has suggested the role of cholesterol and possibly statins improving the mortality in patients with breast cancer, lung cancer, prostate cancer and bowel cancer. Other prominent studies include health services research evaluating differences in death rates from weekend admission and discharge from UK hospitals, ethnic variations and the interplay between cardiovascular disease and mental health.

== Early life and education ==
Rahul Potluri was born in India and moved to the UK at the age of eight. He attended King Edwards VI Five Ways School in Birmingham. He undertook medical undergraduate training at the University of Birmingham. His clinical training included medicine and cardiology in London and Manchester. He was appointed as Honorary Clinical Lecturer in Cardiology at Aston University, Birmingham, UK in 2013.

== ACALM (Algorithm for Comorbidities, Associations, Length of stay and Mortality) ==
Potluri developed the ACALM methodology as a medical student and along with Hardeep Uppal founded the ACALM Study Unit in 2013. Research from this unit is performed from a large clinical dataset of over one million patients which is developed using ACALM methodology from anonymous routinely collected data.

Potluri is an expert in big data analytics in medical and healthcare research. He spoke on the topic at the European Society of Cardiology Conference in Rome, Italy, in August 2016 and highlighted potential developments in the field to come.

== Research ==
=== Cholesterol and Cancer ===
Potluri and the ACALM Study Unit showed for the first time in humans, a possible association between high cholesterol and breast cancer. This work was presented at the European Society of Cardiology, Frontiers in Cardiovascular Biology Conference in Barcelona, July 2014 and was widely reported in the global media. Further research presented in 2016 showed the role of high cholesterol and possibly the role of statins improving the mortality and survival of patients with breast cancer, lung cancer, bowel cancer and prostate cancer and strengthening calls for a clinical trial of statins in cancer.

=== Weekend effect on hospital care ===
Potluri presented research from the ACALM Study Unit at the European Society of Cardiology Conference in London, August 2015, which showed that heart attack patients admitted at the weekend died earlier compared to those admitted during the working week. Subsequent research looking at patients discharged from UK hospitals at the weekend had significantly worsened mortality and survival compared to those discharged during the working week. This was the first study of its kind from the UK. The significance and implications of these findings for UK are being widely debated. Further studies performed in 2016 and presented at the British Cardiovascular Society Conference showed that patients admitted with a diagnosis of atrial fibrillation during the weekend had worse mortality and patients with heart failure discharged at the weekend also had a higher risk of death.

=== Ethnic variations in healthcare ===
Research led by Potluri evaluating ethnic group variations in healthcare and particularly length of stay in hospital and mortality has been widely published. His work from the ACALM Study Unit showed that patients of South Asian origin stay in hospital for a shorter period of time compared to other ethnic groups in a variety of conditions such as Myocardial Infarction, Pulmonary Embolism, Stroke, Diabetes Mellitus and Atrial Fibrillation. Other research focusing on young South Asians has shown that they have a higher risk of Diabetes and associated heart disease compared to other ethnic groups. In 2010, he presented research at the World Congress of Cardiology in Beijing which showed that Haemorrhagic Stroke is increasing amongst South Asians and was reported in the media.

=== Cardiovascular disease and mental health ===
Potluri's research from 2007 has highlighted and shown the significant effect of mental health conditions on physical health and in particular cardiovascular disease. A series of publications have led to raised awareness of psychiatric conditions amongst cardiovascular disease in the UK. Specifically research showing for the first time that mental health conditions prolong length of hospital stay in patients with heart failure highlighted significant cost and service provision implications for the United Kingdom National Health Service.

Another important study which was widely reported showed that married people with heart attacks had significantly improved mortality and long-term survival compared to single and divorced patients. The implications of these findings were widely debated as Marriage was thought to be a proxy for psychosocial support which is essential for heart attack patient to ensure they take all the prescribed medications which determines long term outcome.

== Awards and prizes ==
He was awarded the Cochrane prize from the Faculty of Public Health, United Kingdom for his research on patients of South Asian origin in 2007. Other international prizes include the Young Investigator Award from the International Atherosclerosis Society at the World Congress of Cardiology, Beijing in 2010, the Asian Society of Cardiovascular Imaging (ASCI) Travelling Fellowship from the Hong Kong College of Radiologists in 2011 and the Young Investigator Grant from the European Neurological Society, Milan in 2009. National prizes as a medical student have included the Wellcome Trust Prize in 2007, the Diabetes UK award in 2007 and the Denis Burkitt Award from the British Nutrition Foundation.

== See also ==
- Aston Medical School
- List of Indian Britons
- List of University of Birmingham alumni
