= Aligh n'targa =

Village in Morocco

Coordinates: 31°16′N 6°31′W

Aligh n'Targa ("down stream") is a village in the rural town of Toundoute, in Ouarzazate Province, Drâa-Tafilalet, Morocco.

Aligh n'Targa is located in the vicinity of Skoura, 50 km north of the city of Ouarzazate.

== Gallery ==
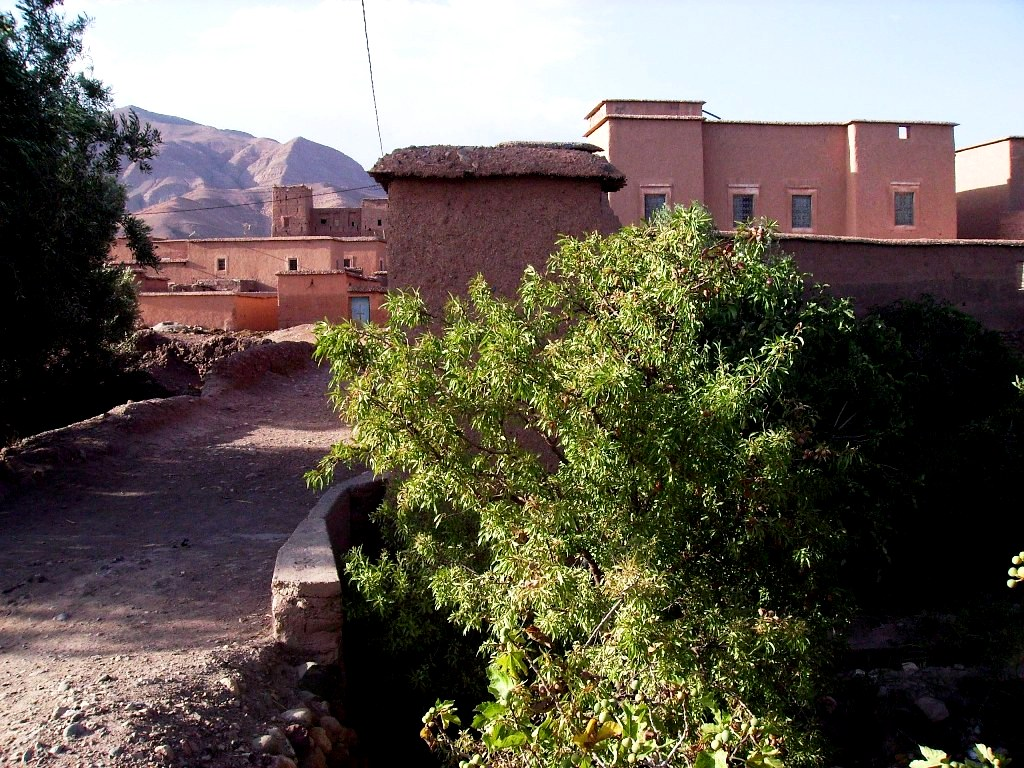
Idder

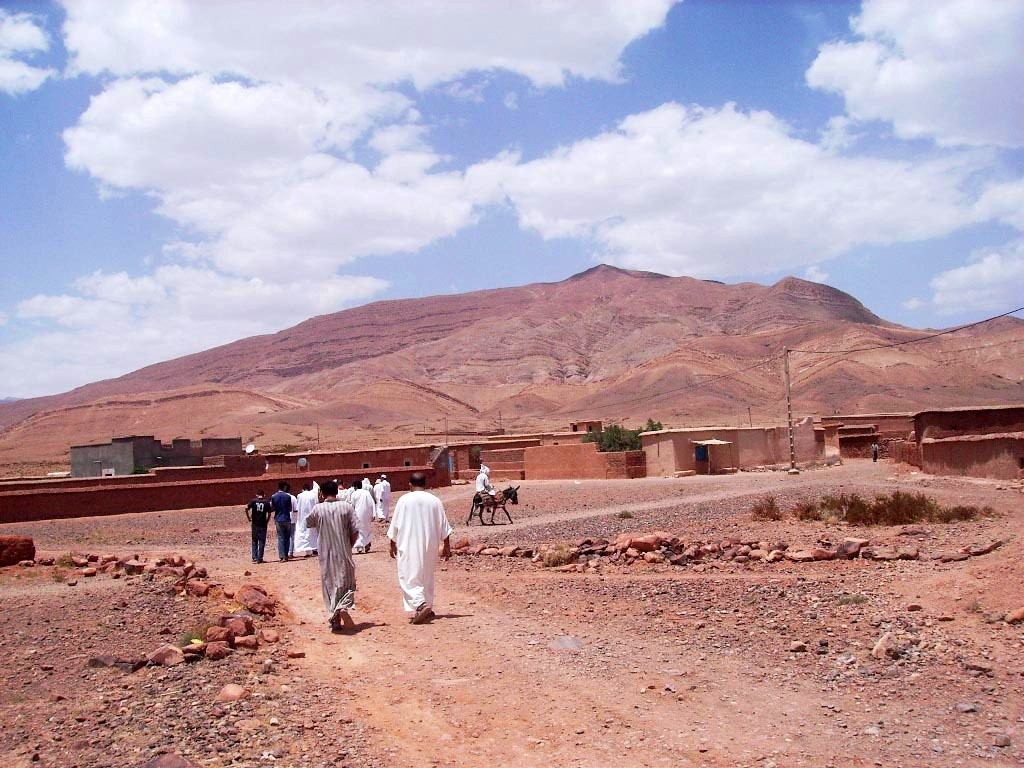
Lqadouh

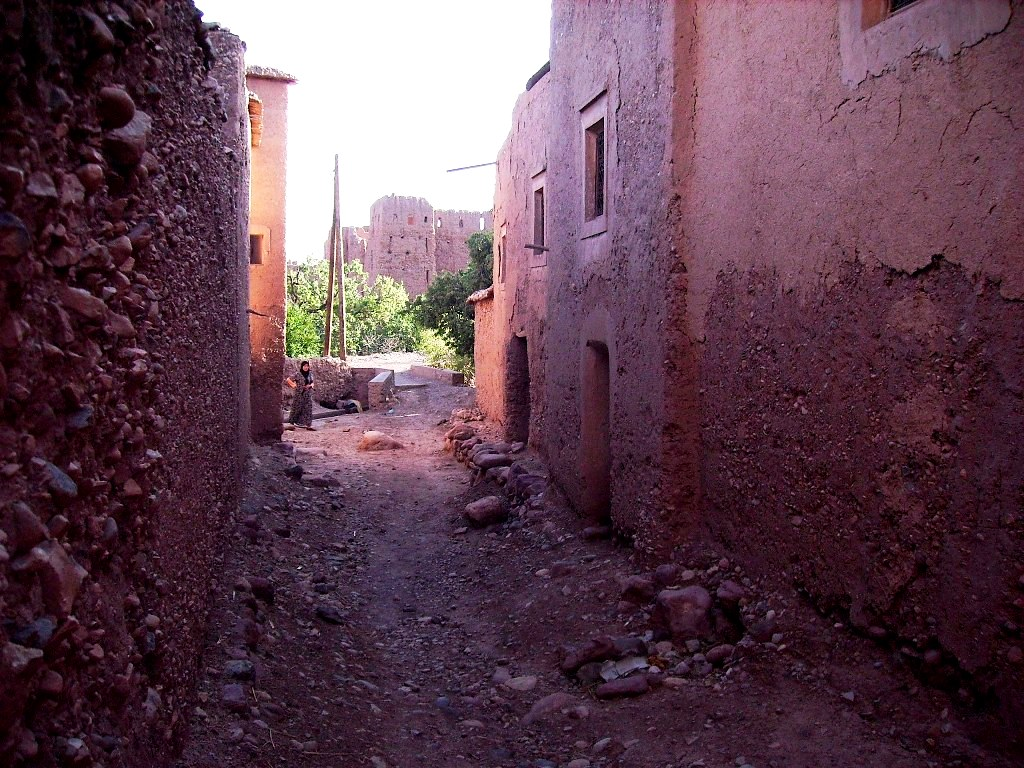
Tasoukt

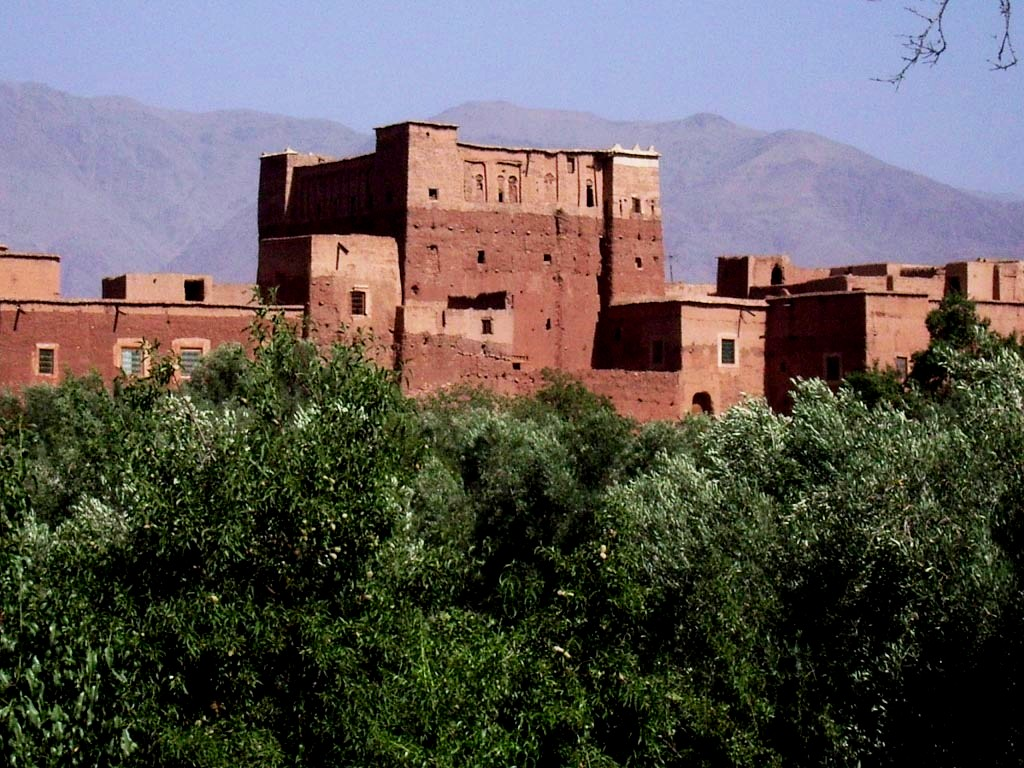
Lahcini

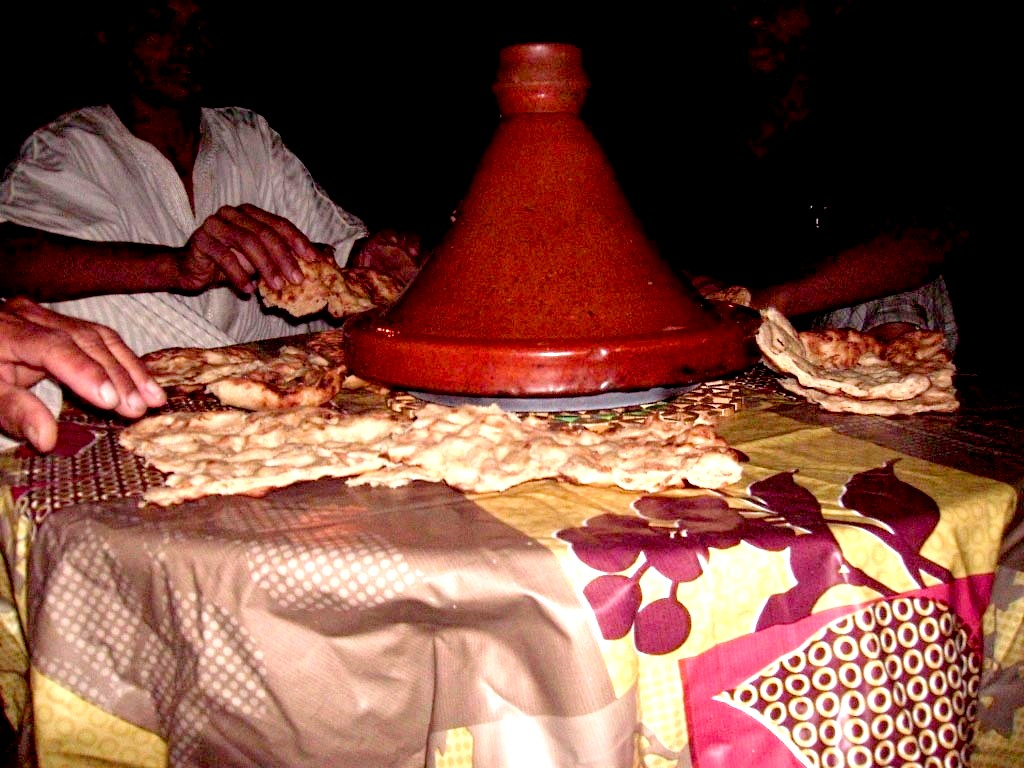
Tagine : one of the dishes of Aligh n'targa

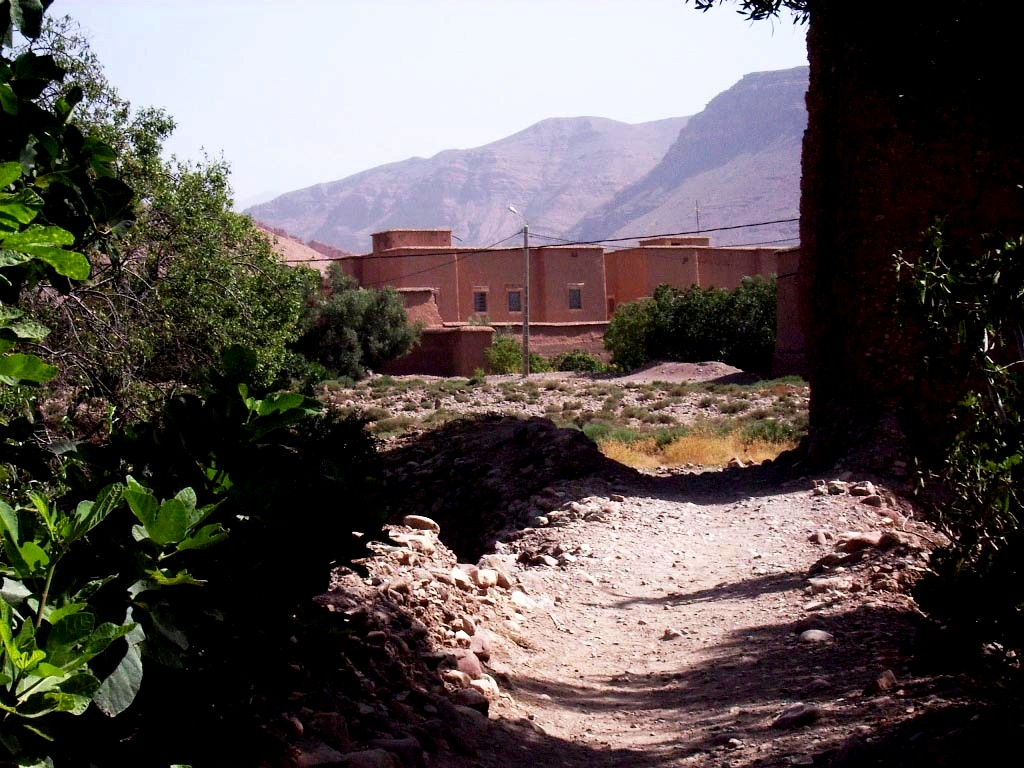
The old cemetery of Aligh n'targa
