= Aston Medical School =

Coordinates: 52.486438°N 1.888310°W

- Type: Medical school
- Established: 2014
- Parent institution: Aston University
- Dean: Anthony Hilton
- Students: 700
- Location: Birmingham, West Midlands, England, United Kingdom
- Website: www.aston.ac.uk/aston-medical-school

Aston Medical School (AMS) is part of Aston University, located in the city centre of Birmingham, in the United Kingdom. It is the 34th medical school in the UK and 6th in the Midlands. It exists to train doctors and to promote medical research. Aston Medical School was conceived and led by the founder Professor Asif Ahmed, who was the inaugural Executive Dean and also served as the first Pro-Vice-Chancellor for Health. The current Dean of Aston Medical School is Professor Anthony Hilton.

== Course ==
The Bachelor of Medicine, Bachelor of Surgery (MB ChB) degree is a 5-year course. Phase I (the first two years) consist of learning through a systems based approach the structure and function of the human body. Teaching is generally delivered via traditional lectures, small group learning, and exposure to anatomical models and cadaveric specimens. Early clinical training is integrated into this phase with extensive clinical correlations, clinical skills teaching and community based general practice experience. Phase II (final three years) consists of predominantly hospital based training in the West Midlands region. Students will be offered the opportunity to undertake an integrated postgraduate certificate in Health Leadership as a student selected component of phase II.

Aston Medical School will also offer various research options for postgraduate students.

== Admissions ==
From September 2015 Aston Medical School took PhD students into Aston Medical Research Institute (AMRI). In September 2016, Aston Medical School started a taught MSc course in Surgery for Specialist Registrars which coincided with Aston's 50th Anniversary. The first undergraduate MBChB students commenced studies in September 2018, following approval of its programme by the General Medical Council which regulates the medical profession in the United Kingdom.

Aston Medical School has been fully accredited in 2023 after the first batch of medical students graduated.

== Research ==
Aston Medical Research Institute (AMRI) is the Translational Medicine arm of Aston University and brings together all five schools with a distinct focus: to rapidly develop new and affordable medical therapies and diagnostics for global use with relative ease. In the first instance, AMS researchers are focused on the areas of cardiology, obstetrics and regenerative medicine. A number of Early Career Researchers from the USA have joined AMRI and AMS on Marie Curie Fellowships. The ACALM Study Unit founded by Rahul Potluri is in collaboration with Aston Medical School and has undertaken notable research.
