= Ruta (disambiguation) =

Ruta, commonly known as rue, is a genus of strongly-scented evergreen subshrubs.

Ruta may also refer to:

== People ==
=== Last name ===
- Clemente Ruta (1668–1767), Italian painter
- Domenica Ruta, American author
- Enrico Ruta (1869–1939), Italian philosopher, sociologist and translator
- Jason Ruta (born 1979), Canadian television personality and actor
- Gilda Ruta (1856–1932), Italian pianist, music educator and composer
- Pietro Ruta (born 1987), Italian rower
- Vanessa Ruta, American neurobiologist

=== First name ===
- Ruta Gedmintas (born 1983), English actress
- Ruta Lealamanua (born 1974), New Zealand softball player
- Ruta Lee (born 1935), Canadian actress and dancer
- Ruta Šaca-Marjaša (1927–2016), Jewish Latvian lawyer, writer, poet and politician
- Ruta Sepetys (born 1967), Lithuanian-American writer of historical fiction

== Places ==
- Ruta, Warmian-Masurian Voivodeship, a village in Poland
- Ruta, Lovrenc na Pohorju, a village in Slovenia

== Fiction ==
- Divine Beast Vah Ruta, one of the key dungeons in The Legend of Zelda: Breath of the Wild

== See also ==
- Rūta, a Lithuanian and Latvian female given name
- Destinus RUTA, a series of small cruise missile
