= Aston Business School =

Coordinates: 52.4862°N 1.8887°W

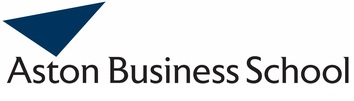
- Type: Business School
- Established: 1947
- Affiliations: Aston University
- Dean: Professor Marian Garcia
- Students: +3000
- Location: Birmingham, England
- Website: www.aston.ac.uk/abs

Aston Business School (ABS), is an international business school part of Aston University in Birmingham, England.

== History ==
The Department of Industrial Administration at the Birmingham Central Technical College (now Aston University) enrolled its first students in 1947, with a remit to "consolidate and extend teaching work in industrial administration". David Hall Bramley was the first Head of the Department, and is recognised for his pioneering work in Industrial Management Education at the university.

Research at Aston Business School has its roots back to 1961 when the Industrial Administration Research Unit (IARU) was set up and within it the ‘Aston Studies’ on organisations. The research was ground breaking with the study of groups of workers and individuals being carried out in their workplace and organisation setting.

Aston received its charter in 1966, and in October 1972 the Management Centre was set up, merging the Department of Industrial Administration and the Graduate Centre for Management Studies and offering undergraduate, postgraduate, research and post-experience courses. 1978 saw the opening of the Nelson Building, purpose-built for the Management Centre. Its first MBAs were awarded in 1979. The Centre became the Aston Business School in 1988.

The MSc in International Business offered for the first time in 1997, and the BSc in International Business and Management in 2005.

In 1999, the Aston Business School Advisory Board was formed. The Board advises the School's senior leadership team on strategic areas in relation to learning and teaching, research, and business engagement. Several board members support specific initiatives within the School, with many board members acting as mentors to final year undergraduate students.

Aston Business School gained the first of its triple accreditation awards EQUIS, in 1999, followed by AACSB in 2003 and AMBA in 2006. It has maintained triple accreditation ever since.

In 2006, a £20m extension to the Nelson Building opened. Now called the Aston Business School building, it includes a dedicated MBA suite as well as conference centre and hotel.

== Programmes ==
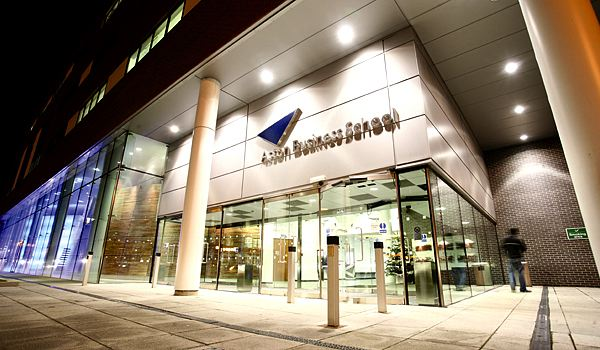
Aston Business School's Nelson Building

Aston Business School offers a range of undergraduate (BSc) degrees including single honours programmes covering the main business and management disciplines, and a choice of joint honours programmes. A distinctive feature of Aston's first degrees is the industrial placement year which provides students with professional workplace experience.

At postgraduate level, the Aston MBA is offered through full-time, part-time and online learning, together with a wide range of taught MSc courses. These also include business and industry placements.

Aston's research degree programmes include the Doctor of Administration (DBA), PhD/MPhil in Management and MSc Research in the Social Sciences (Management).

Aston was one of the first UK universities to offer degree apprenticeships, a new route to higher education based on a collaboration with employers, apprentices and universities. Aston Business School delivers the Chartered Manager Degree Apprenticeship amongst many others.

In 2017, Aston Business School began offering a suite of postgraduate business and management courses fully online as part of a new Aston University Online initiative.

In 2019, Aston Business School launched undergraduate and postgraduate degrees in Business Enterprise Development. Unlike traditional degree courses, there are no modules, instead students work as a team to establish their own enterprises and are supported through a process of team coaching.

== Rankings and reputation ==
Aston Business School is part of the one per cent of business schools globally to hold ‘triple-crown’ accreditation.

The first of its triple accreditations was achieved in 1999 – EQUIS (European Quality Improvement System). In 2003 – Aston gained AACSB (Association to Advance Collegiate Schools of Business) accreditation. AMBA accreditation (The Association of MBA's) was awarded in 2005. The Aston MBA is one of the longest established MBA programmes in the UK, and one of the first to achieve AMBA accreditation. In 2018 the programme celebrated 40 successful years. In 2019, 2020 and 2024 Aston was ranked in the top 100 for business and management by the QS world subject rankings.

The Teaching Excellence Framework (TEF), awarded Aston University a Gold award – the highest possible accolade on 22 June 2017, finding that students from all backgrounds achieve ‘consistently outstanding outcomes’, with very high proportions of students going into highly skilled employment or further study.

Aston was one of the first UK business schools to be awarded the Small Business Charter, in recognition of dedication to the local small business community.

The Aston MBA has been ranked in the global top 100 by the Economist Which MBA 2021 and the global top 100 for MBA career specialisations in marketing, entrepreneurship, consulting, information management and technology by the QS World University Rankings.

In 2020, Aston University was named Outstanding Entrepreneurial University by the Times Higher Education Awards, recognising the work carried out in Aston Business School with student entrepreneurs and local small and medium-sized businesses. In the same year, Aston University was named The Guardian University of the Year.

== Working with business ==
Aston Business School works with local, national and international businesses to help them embed new strategies and practice which emerge from the school's research findings. It does this through Knowledge Transfer Partnerships, bespoke research projects, MBA Business Consultancy Projects and MSc research projects.

The Aston Centre for Growth works with small and medium-sized businesses (SMEs) in the West Midlands to help them realise their growth potential. The Aston Centre for Growth delivered the Goldman Sachs 10,000 Small Businesses programme. Other SME support programmes include the Aston Programme for Small Business Growth, Minerva Birmingham Pitch Up and Productivity through People. In 2020, Aston Business School was one of the institutions selected to deliver the national Small Business Leadership Programme to support local SMEs to survive and develop growth strategies during the COVID-19 pandemic.

The Advanced Services Group works with manufacturing companies to help them transform their business models from being reliant on traditional manufacturing to developing advanced services (servitization).

The Centre for Circular Economy and Advanced Sustainability (CEAS) develops research on sustainability innovations and industrial transitions to the circular economy, including industrial symbiosis strategies and the enabling role of digital technologies.

The Low Carbon SMEs Group work with SMEs in the West Midlands to help them to identify ways of reducing their carbon emissions as well as reducing costs and creating efficiencies within their businesses.
