= Ibn Tofail University Hospital =

Geography
- Location: Marrakesh, Morocco
- Coordinates: 31°38′31″N 8°0′55″W

Links
- Lists: Hospitals in Morocco

Ibn Tofail University Hospital is one of the major hospitals of Marrakesh, Morocco. In February 2001 the Moroccan Government signed an $8 million loan agreement with The OPEC Fund for International Development to help improve medical services in and around Marrakech, which led to expansions of Ibn Tofail and Ibn Nafess Hospital. Seven new buildings were constructed, with a total floor area of 43,000 square metres (460,000 sq ft). New radiotherapy and medical equipment was provided and 29,000 square metres (310,000 sq ft) of existing hospital space rehabilitated.
