= Aston Centre for Europe =

Research hub in Birmingham, UK

Coordinates: 52.4860°N 1.8895°W

- Aston University
- Type: Research centre
- Established: 2009
- Director: Professor Simon Green, Professor John Gaffney, Dr. Nathaniel Copsey
- Patron: Lord Kerr of Kinlochard GCMG
- Website: www1.aston.ac.uk/lss/research/centres-institutes/aston-centre-europe/

The Aston Centre for Europe (ACE) is a multi-disciplinary research hub located within Aston University, UK. Its focus is on contemporary analysis of the politics and policies of the European Union, governance in the wider Europe, and Europe's global relations. It was launched in 2009 with the support of a major grant from Aston University's Strategic Investment Fund.

Masters students are an important element of the Aston Centre for Europe and are actively encouraged to take part in the events, seminars, debates and workshops that ACE offers throughout the academic year. ACE delivers a suite of 5 academic programmes at Masters (MA) level.

== History and Leadership ==
The Aston Centre for Europe is co-directed by Professor Simon Green, an expert in immigration policy and German politics, Professor John Gaffney, an expert on political leadership, and Dr. Nat Copsey, an expert in European integration and the EU's international relations.

ACE has a number of practitioner fellows who act in an advisory capacity. Many of these have significant experience in European institutions, regulatory politics and policy-making, as well as academia.

== Research and development ==
Conferences

Conferences and workshops addressing European policy issues have been delivered by the Aston Centre for Europe since its inception in 2009.

Cooperation

The Aston Centre for Europe delivers a number of its Masters programmes in co-operation with the Institut d'études politiques de Lille (Sciences-Po, Lille), the Institut d'études politiques de Rennes (Sciences-Po, Rennes), and the Otto-Friedrich University of Bamberg, Germany.

ACE has also delivered professional training courses and workshops on European integration to civil servants from the Russian Federation.
