= Ibn Al-Nafees Hospital =

Ibn Nafees Hospital مستشفى إبن نفيس

Geography
- Location: Boulevard Al Moustachfayate, Marrakesh, Morocco
- Coordinates: 31°40′13″N 7°59′48″W

Organisation
- Type: General

Links
- Lists: Hospitals in Morocco

Ibn Nafis Hospital is one of the major hospitals of Marrakesh, Morocco. In February 2001 the Moroccan Government signed an $8 million loan agreement with The OPEC Fund for International Development to help improve medical services in and around Marrakech, which led to expansions of Ibn Nafess Hospital and Ibn Tofail University Hospital. Seven new buildings were constructed, with a total floor area of 43,000 square metres (460,000 sq ft). New radiotherapy and medical equipment was provided and 29,000 square metres (310,000 sq ft) of existing hospital space rehabilitated.

== Departments ==
- Emergency service department.
- Oncology department
- Radiation therapy department
- Immunology

== Chief medical director ==
The Chief medical director of the hospital is Professor Ali TAHRI Specialist in Oncology and Radiation Therapy.
