= Rūta Bunkutė =

Lithuanian fitness and figure competitor (born 1979)

- Professional bodybuilder
- Bunkutė at the NPC Border State San Diego 2012 Contest

Personal info
- Born: November 28, 1979 (age 46); Alytus, Lithuania.

Best statistics
- Height: 5 ft 2 in (157 cm)
- Weight: Contest: 125 lb (57 kg); Off season: 160 lb (73 kg)

Professional (Pro) career
- Best win: Amateur Olympia, Las Vegas, Nevada, 7th place; 2018
- Active: 2003 - present

Rūta Bunkutė (born November 28, 1979, in Alytus, Lithuania) is a current IFBB/NPC Amateur fitness and figure competitor from Lithuania.

== Early life and education ==
Rūta Bunkutė was born in Alytus, and moved to Vilnius, capital of Lithuania, at age sixteen. She has two sisters and a brother. She attended Vilnius Ozas Sport Secondary School. She graduated with two Science Degrees: Bachelor of Engineering (BSc) and Master of Science (MSc) in Construction engineering (Highway engineering), from Vilnius Gediminas Technical University (VGTU). She earned a second Master of Science (MSc) Degree in 2010 from the Aston University, Birmingham, United Kingdom as a specialist in engineering management.

== Career ==
Rūta Bunkutė started ballet when she was seven, then moved on to national round dancing and gymnastics. Her competitive career started at age seven and continued through secondary school as a gymnast, she dropped out of dance classes due to tight schedule in gymnastics. She stopped competing in gymnastics as a result of a serious head injury in 1997, which caused her to start strength and weight training as an alternative.

In 1998, she joined bodybuilding club MAVI in Vilnius where she trained for seven years. Her first competition as fitness competitor were in 2003 in Lithuania where she placed third. The following two years, Rūta competed in nine more competitions, alternating between the Fitness and Figure divisions and competed in the World Fitness Federation (WFF) World Championships in 2004 and 2005, where placed second and third in Fitness and Figure divisions. In 2006 Ruta relocated to the United Kingdom and currently lives in La Jolla, California.

== Accomplishments ==
- Student Athlete of the year Award in 2005 by Physical Education and Sports Department under the Government of the Republic of Lithuania.
- Listed in Lithuanian Sport Encyclopedia in 2008

== Competitions ==
Rūta Bunkutė participated in the following shows:

- 2003 IFBB – LT Lithuanian Cup I, Kupiskis – Figure - 4th place
- 2003 IFBB – LT Lithuanian Cup II, Vilnius – Figure - 3rd place
- 2003 WFF/NABBA Lithuania Open Cup, Marijampole – Fitness - 2nd place
- 2004 WFF Lithuania Open Cup, Klaipeda – Fitness - 2nd place
- 2004 WFF World Championships, Vilnius – Fitness - 7th place
- 2004 WFF World Championships, Vilnius – Couples - 2nd place
- 2005 WFF Lithuania Cup, Klaipeda – Fitness - 1st place
- 2005 WFF European Championships, Ryga – Fitness - 7th place
- 2005 WFF Lithuania Cup, Klaipeda – Fitness - 2nd place
- 2005 WFF Worlds Championships, Vilnius – Fitness - 3rd place
- 2005 WFF Worlds Championships, Vilnius – Couples - 3rd place
- 2007 UKBFF West Midlands Championships, Leamington Spa – 1st place
- 2007 UKBFF Midlands Championships, Birmingham – Bodyfitness - 1st place
- 2007 UKBFF British Finals’07, Nottingham – Bodyfitness - 14th place
- 2007 UKBFF Stars of Tomorrow, London – Bodyfitness - 1st place
- 2008 UKBFF British Finals’08, Nottingham – Bodyfitness - 14th place
- 2011 NPC Tournament of Champions, Los Angeles – Figure - 6th place
- 2011 UKBFF Midlands Championships, Birmingham – Bodyfitness - 1st place
- 2011 UKBFF British Finals’11, Nottingham – Bodyfitness - 4th place
- 2012 UKBFF London & South East Championships, London – 2nd place
- 2012 IFBB Arnolds Classics Europe, Madrid – Figure - 13th place
- 2012 UKBFF British Finals’12, Manchester – Bodyfitness - 14th place
- 2012 NPC/IFBB Border States Championships, San Diego – 10th place
- 2014 NPC/IFBB Ultimate Warriors Championship, San Diego – 8th place
- 2016 NPC California Night of Champions, San Diego - Masters 35+ Figure - 7th place
- 2016 NPC California Night of Champions, San Diego - Open Figure - 8th place
- 2016 NPC Pacific USA, San Diego - Masters 35+ Figure - 5th place
- 2016 NPC Pacific USA, San Diego - Open Figure - 6th place
- 2016 UKBFF West Midlands Championships, Birmingham, United Kingdom, Bodyfitness - 2nd place
- 2017 NPC Tournament of Champions, San Diego - 2nd place
- 2018 IFBB Arnolds Amateur Championships, Ohio, United States - 9th place
- 2018 NPC Pittsburgh Championships, Pittsburgh, United States - 2nd place
- 2018 Amateur Olympia, Las Vegas, Nevada - 7th place
