= 2015–2016 Quebec protests =

Protest movement

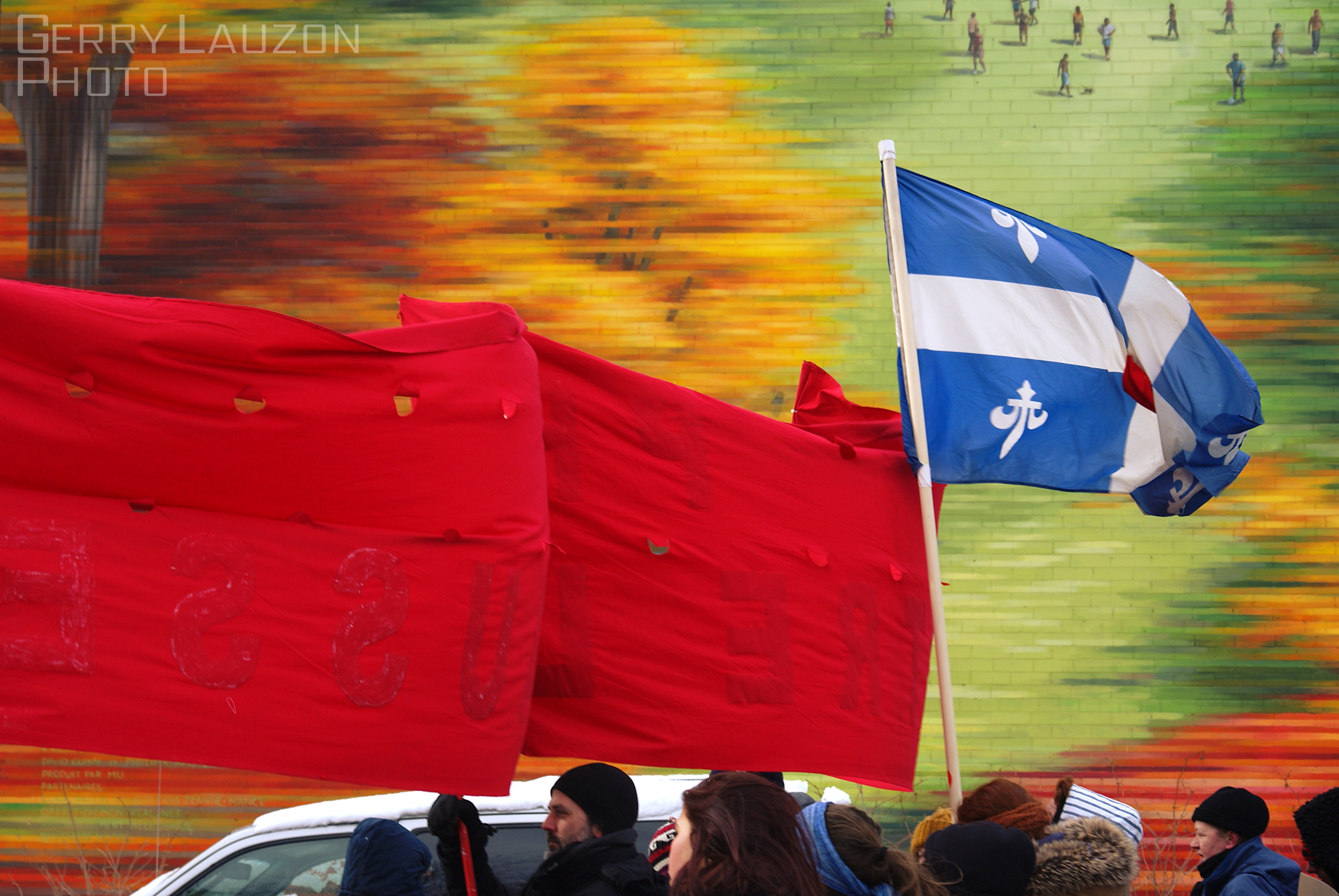
- Protests and rallies in Quebec
- Date: March 21, 2015 – January 2016
- Location: Quebec
- Caused by: Budget law; Austerity measures
- Goals: Repeal of laws
- Methods: Demonstrations
- Result: Protests suppressed by force

The Quebec protests of 2015–2016 is a protest movement that began on March 21, 2015 in Quebec, in the context of what some student associations, left-wing groups, columnists qualify as social strikes, to denounce the budget restriction measures adopted by the Philippe Couillard government. 130,000 students are on strike during the first national demonstration on April 2, 2015, including 55,000 on general strike. Like the 2012 Quebec student protests, the movement was initiated by students and encompassed various issues, particularly that of public finances.

== Background ==
Quebec has a long history of Rallies, Revolts, Uprisings and Student protests, most likely due to labour shortages, university fee hikes, tuition fees and payments, Unemployment, Budget measures increases and restrictions and hardships among students. In 1968, hundreds of thousands of students marched state-wide against Budget laws and pension reforms.

== Protests ==
Protests occurred throughout 2015 by many public and social sectors, mainly leading a second protest movement in September–November 2015 and strikes in 2016. Popular protests first erupted in March 2015, when different trade unions and student opposition groups organised and orchestrated demonstrations and rallies across Quebec and cities in eastern Canada against budget restriction measures adopted by the government. 200,000 participated in strikes in March, April and May, when most of the unrest was taking place. Protesters was demanding justice and tuition freeze, university fee hikes to decrease and more jobs among Students.

Tens of thousands of protesters and demonstrators, public and social sectors participated in a national movement and peaceful demonstrations, Rallies and Picketing against harsh working conditions and low wages for workers. Mass protest movements occurred throughout the fall of 2015 and spring of 2016. Mass protests were also held by state-run media, Journalists, Healthcare workers and university students, marching on small lanes and narrow streets in downtown Quebec in September, October, November, December and January.

== See also ==
- 2012 Quebec student protests
