= Geoffrey Vernon Ball =

Professor of ophthalmics

Prof. Geoffrey Vernon Ball
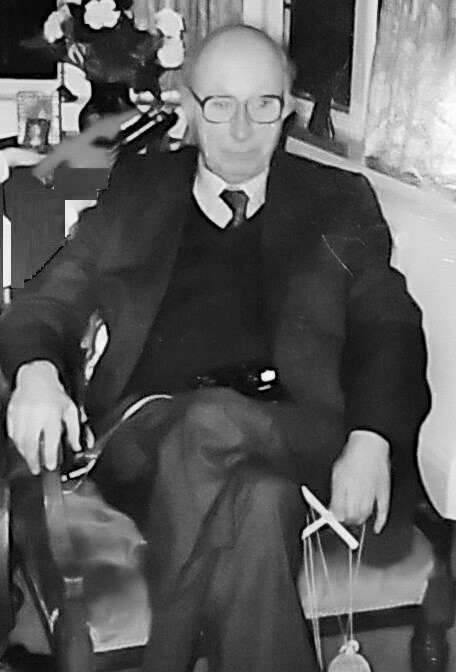
- Born: Geoffrey Vernon Ball; 19 May 1926; Sutton Coldfield, England
- Died: 27 March 2015
- Occupation: professor of ophthalmics
- Years active: 1948–2015
- Height: 1.8 m (5 ft 11 in)

Geoffrey Vernon Ball was one of the first lecturing professors of ophthalmics, pioneering its early inception through the 1950s while head of Department at Aston University, England. He was appointed the first full-time lecturing precision in ophthalmic optics outside of London. in the 1970s Ball together with his colleague Michael Wolffe conducted an extensive experience for Aston students in NHS hospitals all over the United Kingdom including Exeter, Cheltenham, Newcastle-upon-Tyne, Bournemouth and Nottingham.
