= Stephen Smith (gynaecologist) =

British medical researcher and educator

Stephen Kevin Smith is a British academic and health executive who led the creation of the United Kingdom's first Academic Health Science Centre at Imperial College London.

Smith was Principal of the Faculty of Medicine at Imperial College, London and Chief Executive of Imperial College Healthcare NHS Trust at its inception in 2007 then the largest such trust in the United Kingdom. Later on, he was Dean of the Faculty of Medicine Dentistry and Health Sciences at the University of Melbourne having been the Vice President (Research) at the Nanyang Technological University and Founding Dean of the joint Lee Kong Chian School of Medicine in Singapore. He was a founder of the Sino-Chinese biotechnology company, GNI Group Ltd.

A gynaecologist by training, he has published over 230 papers on reproductive medicine and cancer and was awarded his Doctor of Science in 2001 for his work in Cambridge on the complex gene pathways that regulate the growth of blood vessels in reproductive tissue using gene network analysis. He was head of the Department of Obstetrics and Gynaecology at the University of Cambridge. He now serves on the board of Great Ormond Street, Children's Hospital, London and a range of biotechnology and digital analytics companies.

== Career ==
Smith began his academic career at the University of Edinburgh (1978–1981 and 1985–1988) and the University of Sheffield (1981–1985). Soon after, he served at the University of Cambridge as Professor of Obstetrics and Gynaecology and Head of the Department of Obstetrics and Gynaecology (1988–2003). He was also the Clinical Director, Women's Services, at Addenbrooke's Hospital National Health Service Trust (1997–2003). In 2004, Smith served as Executive Dean of the Faculty of Medicine, Dentistry and Nursing at the University of Glasgow.

In 2004, he was appointed the Principal of the Faculty of Medicine of Imperial College London, heading one of Europe’s top medical schools through an active period of growth and development. At Imperial College, Smith also led the formation of the United Kingdom's first Academic Health Science Centre as Chief Executive. Launched in 2007, the Imperial College Healthcare National Health Service Trust was formed from the integration of Hammersmith Hospital National Health Service Trust and St Mary’s National Health Service Trust with Imperial College. His pioneering role in establishing the trust was recognised at the 2009 National Health Service Leadership Awards, during which he was named Innovator of the Year.

In 2010, Smith was appointed Imperial College's Pro Rector (Health), while remaining the Chief Executive of the Imperial College Healthcare National Health Service Trust. He took on the role of NTU’s Vice-President (Research) in September 2011 to lead the strategic development of research at the university, which is the fastest-rising Asian institution among the world’s top 100 universities in the QS World University Rankings between 2010 and 2011.

== Research ==
Smith has been active in research since 1978. A gynaecologist by training, he has published over 230 papers on reproductive medicine and cancer. For his work on the complex gene pathways that regulate the growth of blood vessels in reproductive tissue, Smith was awarded his DSc in 2001.

== Appointments ==
Smith is a Fellow of the Academy of Medical Sciences, Australian Academy of Health and Medical Sciences, Royal College of Obstetricians and Gynaecologists and the Royal Society of Arts. In 2009, the Health Service Journal ranked Smith among the top 30 most powerful people in National Health Service management policy and practice in England. He was the only National Health Service chief executive to be included.

Smith has served on numerous committees for organisations such as the United Kingdom’s Medical Research Council, the World Health Organization, the National Institutes of Health (USA), the National Health Service, the British Heart Foundation and the Wellcome Trust. He also sat on the Health Innovation Council of the National Health Service and is a Trustee of Pancreatic Cancer UK and chairs the scientific advisory board.
