= Toundoute =

Coordinates: 31°16′N 6°35′W

- commune
- Interactive map of Toundoute
- Country: Morocco
- Region: Drâa-Tafilalet
- Province: Ouarzazate

Population (2004)
  - Total: 11,877
- Time zone: UTC+0 (GMT)

Toundoute is a commune in Ouarzazate Province, Drâa-Tafilalet, administrative region of Morocco. At the time of the 2004 census, the commune had a total population of 11,877 people living in 1689 households.

== See also ==
- Aligh n'targa
