= Aston University =

University in Birmingham, England

- Coat of arms
- Other names: Aston; University of Aston
- Motto: Forward
- Type: Public
- Established: 1895 – The Birmingham Municipal Technical School; 1927 – Birmingham Central Technical College; 1951 – College of Technology, Birmingham; 1966 – gained university status by royal charter
- Affiliations: ACU; EUA; Universities UK; M5 Universities; Defence Universities Alliance
- Endowment: £1.47 million (2022)
- Budget: £197.7 million (2021–22)
- Chancellor: Jason Wouhra
- Vice-Chancellor: Aleks Subic
- Students: 15,500 (2017–18)
- Undergraduates: 11,935 (2017–18)
- Postgraduates: 3,565 (2017–18)
- Location: Birmingham, England, United Kingdom; 52.4860°N 1.8895°W
- Campus: Urban 60 acres (24 hectares)
- Colours: White and Pink/Purple
- Website: aston.ac.uk
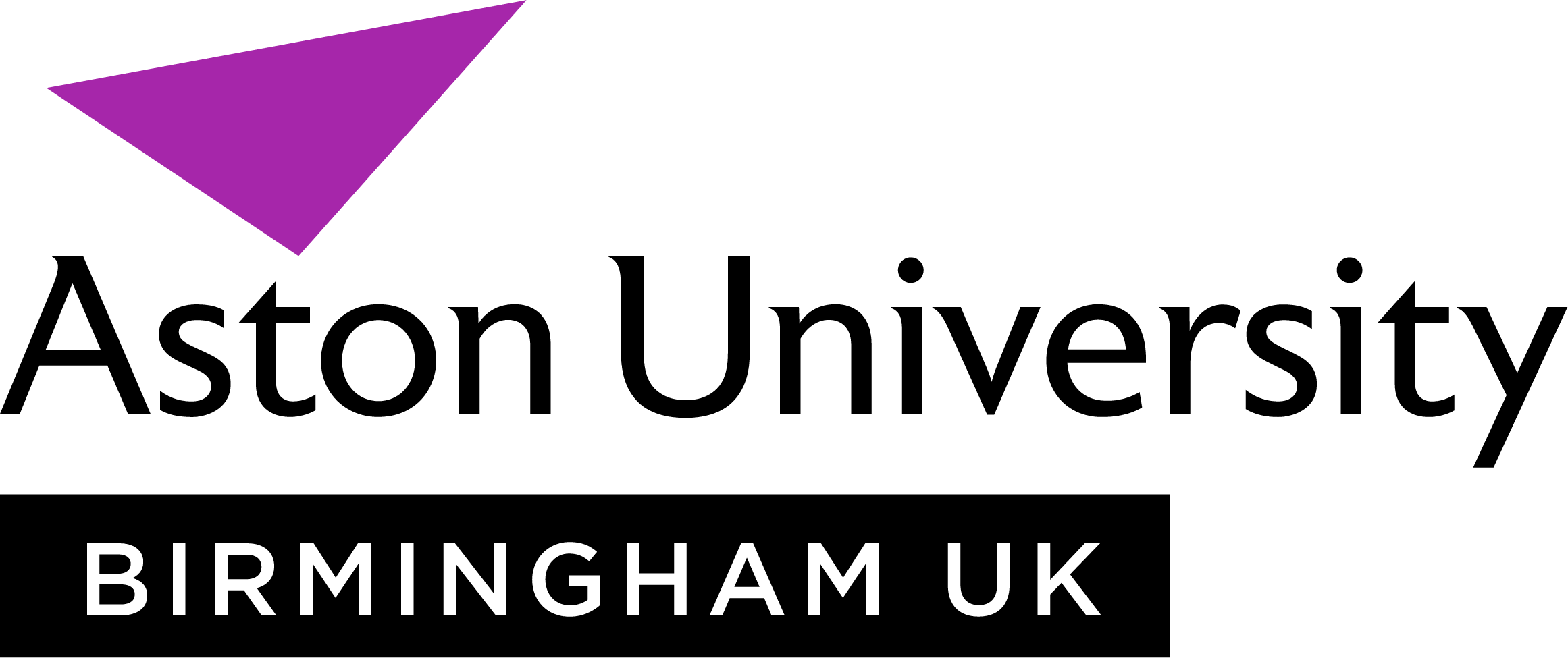

Aston University is a public university situated in the city centre of Birmingham, England. Aston began as the Birmingham Municipal Technical School in 1895, evolving into the UK's first college of advanced technology in 1956. Aston University received its royal charter from Queen Elizabeth II on 22 April 1966.

Aston pioneered the integrated placement year concept over 50 years ago, and more than 73% of Aston students take a placement year, the highest percentage in the UK. The annual income of the institution for 2021–22 was £197.7 million of which £19.3 million was from research grants and contracts, with an expenditure of £219.4 million.

In 2020, Aston University was named "University of the Year" by The Guardian, and the newspaper also awarded Aston Students' Union its "Buildings That Inspire" award. The Times Higher Education Awards named Aston University as its "Outstanding Entrepreneurial University" in 2020.

In September 2021, Aston was shortlisted for University of the Year in the Times Higher Education Awards 2021.

In March 2024, it was announced that Aston University had become the second university in England to be awarded the Athena SWAN Gold Award at an institutional level in recognition of efforts to promote gender equality.

== History ==
=== Predecessor institutions ===
The origins of Aston University are a School of Metallurgy formed in the Birmingham and Midland Institute in 1875. The Birmingham Municipal Technical School was designed by architect Arthur Edwards and opened by John Dugdale in 1894. The school separated from the Institute in 1895, teaching chemistry, physics, metallurgy and electrical engineering. It expanded and by 1917 was also teaching botany and other subjects to trainee teachers. In 1911, commercial classes were introduced and grew into an independent School of Commerce by 1916. The school changed its name in 1927 to the Birmingham Central Technical College, to reflect its changing approach to teaching technology.

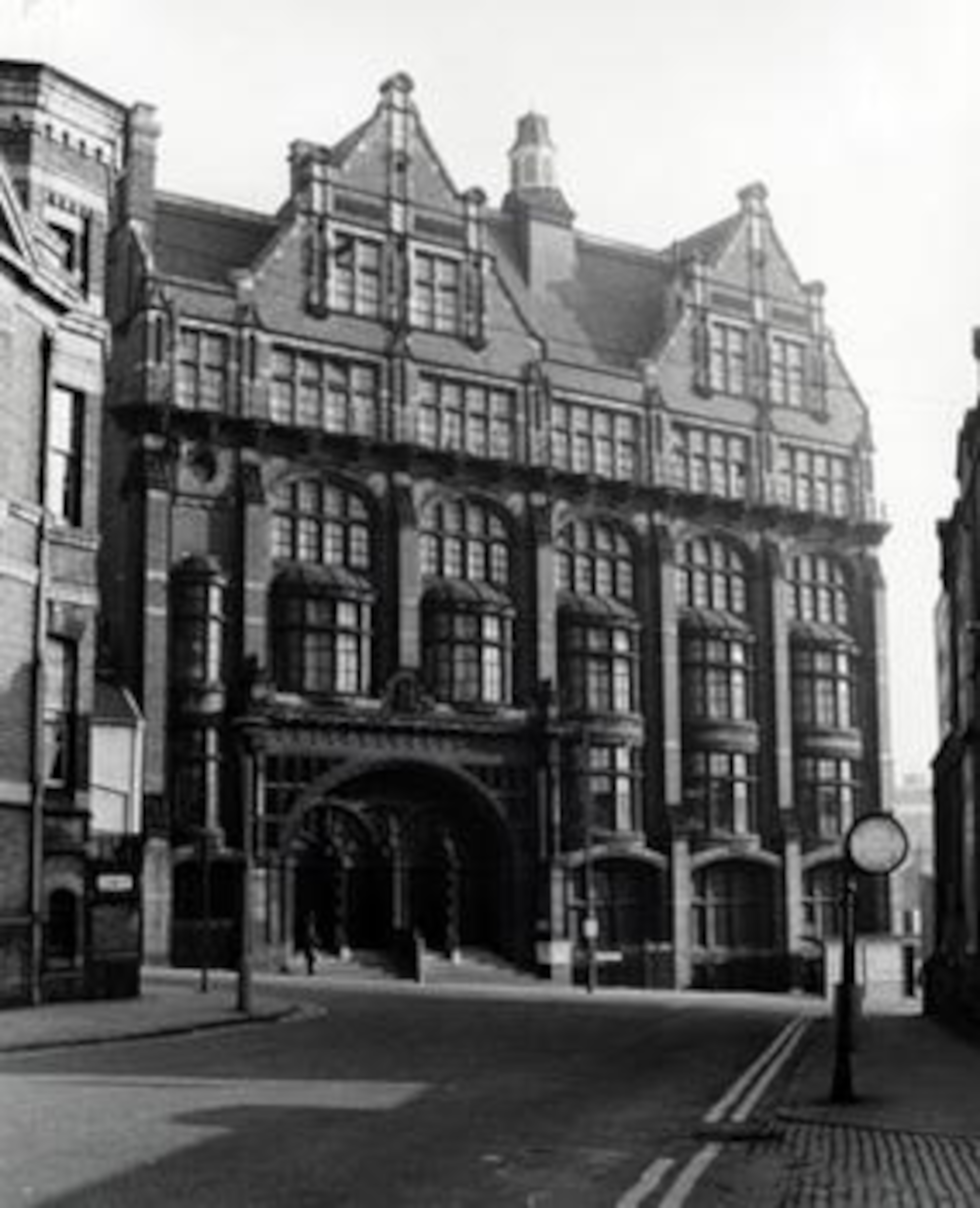
The Birmingham Municipal Technical School in Suffolk Street, founded in 1894.

Queen Elizabeth II opening the Main Building at Gosta Green in 1955.

In 1951, the Technical College was renamed the College of Technology, Birmingham, and work began on the Main Building at Gosta Green. In 1956, it became the first elite designated college of advanced technology and underwent a major expansion. It moved into buildings that were constructed between 1949 and 1955 to a design by Ashley & Newman. Princess Margaret laid one of the first foundation stones at the base of the new building in 1951. The building is one of Europe's largest freestanding brick buildings. In 1955, the College of Advanced Technology was opened by Queen Elizabeth II. The college expanded again to a design by the City Architect of Birmingham Alwyn Sheppard Fidler between 1957 and 1965.

=== University status ===
It officially became the University of Aston in Birmingham on receipt of its royal charter on 22 April 1966, and the first chancellor of the university, Lord Nelson of Stafford, was installed on 10 May. The charter of the university outlines objectives appropriate to a technological university: "to advance, disseminate and apply learning and knowledge by teaching and research, for the benefit of industry and commerce and of the community generally: and to enable students to obtain the advantage of a university education, and such teaching and research may include periods outside the University in industry or commerce or wherever the University considers proper for the best advancement of its objects." The emphasis given to the sandwich course system, and the maintenance of strong links with industry, arises naturally from the institution's history. The motto of the university is the same as that of the City of Birmingham – Forward.

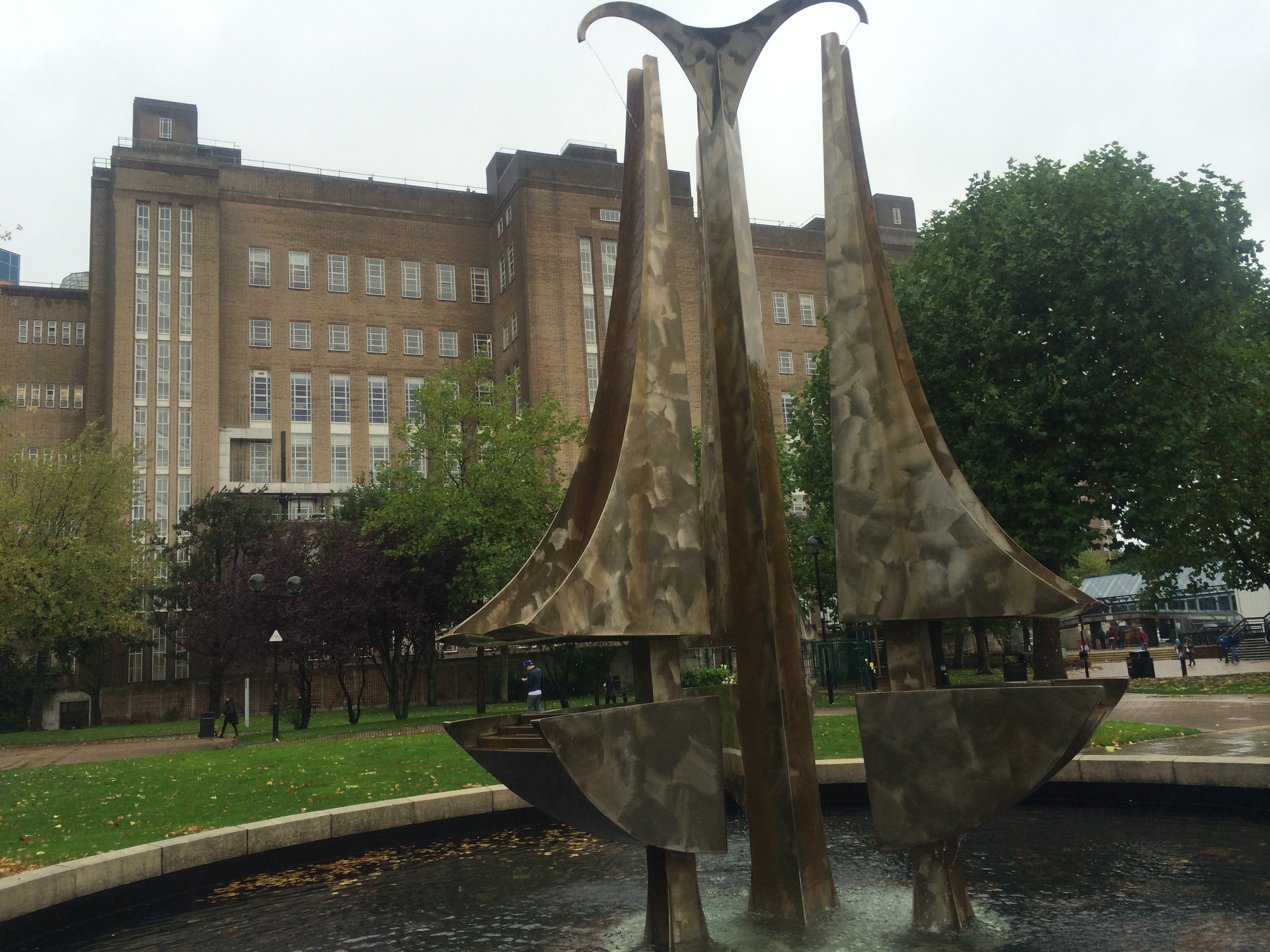
The main building with water sculpture Tipping Triangles by Angela Conner. The building is one of Europe's largest freestanding brick buildings.

In 1983, Aston University, in partnership with Birmingham City Council and Lloyds Bank, established Birmingham Technology Ltd., which manages the Aston Science Park adjacent to the university site. The establishment of the Aston Science Park and Aston University's contribution to the city of Birmingham was fully recognised when the area was granted its own postal address "The Aston Triangle" in 1984, emphasising the campus as an official district of Birmingham. The logo of the establishment takes from the shape of the area.

=== 2000 to present ===
Aston University hosted the British Science Festival in September 2010, said to be Europe's largest public science event.

Since May 2011, Sir John Sunderland has been the Chancellor of Aston University.

The university is a lead sponsor of Aston University Engineering Academy, a university technical college (UTC) which opened in September 2012. The UTC is for students aged 14 to 19 wishing to pursue further study and careers in engineering, and is located at the edge of the Aston University campus.

In October 2014, Aston announced plans to launch Aston Medical School in October 2015. The university also announced a £35 million cash injection for a major upgrade of the campus, including a new £19 million revamp of Aston Business School and improvement work to the Aston Institute of Photonic Technologies and the School of Languages and Social Sciences.

In February 2017, Aston University launched its online programme website. Four of their MSc programmes are offered 100% online to students in the UK and worldwide, including the Aston Business School's MBA.

In July 2017, Aston became the first University in the UK to have degree apprenticeship graduates. Aston began working in close partnership with Capgemini, to create the first degree apprenticeship: Digital and Technology Solutions in 2012.

In 2021, the university announced plans to close its Department of History, Languages and Translation, focusing instead on health, engineering, and business. This decision led to protests from members of the university, as well as humanities scholars broadly. Professional groups, including the Royal Historical Society and the American Historical Association, condemned the move, and public figures, including Sir Keith Burnett and Shadow Education Secretary Kate Green criticised the university leadership. Facing public opposition and protests from staff and students, university officials reversed their position and agreed to save the History programme, although cuts to language instruction would continue.

In 2024, a planning application was submitted to Birmingham City Council for the demolition of the south wing of the main building. In an attempt to "blur the boundaries between campus and city", remarking the wing was a "poor-quality extension to the original 1950's building", plans have been proposed to demolish the south wing, to rebuild the original south-facing main entrance facade, shorten Aston Street, and provide more green space and footpaths.

== Campus ==
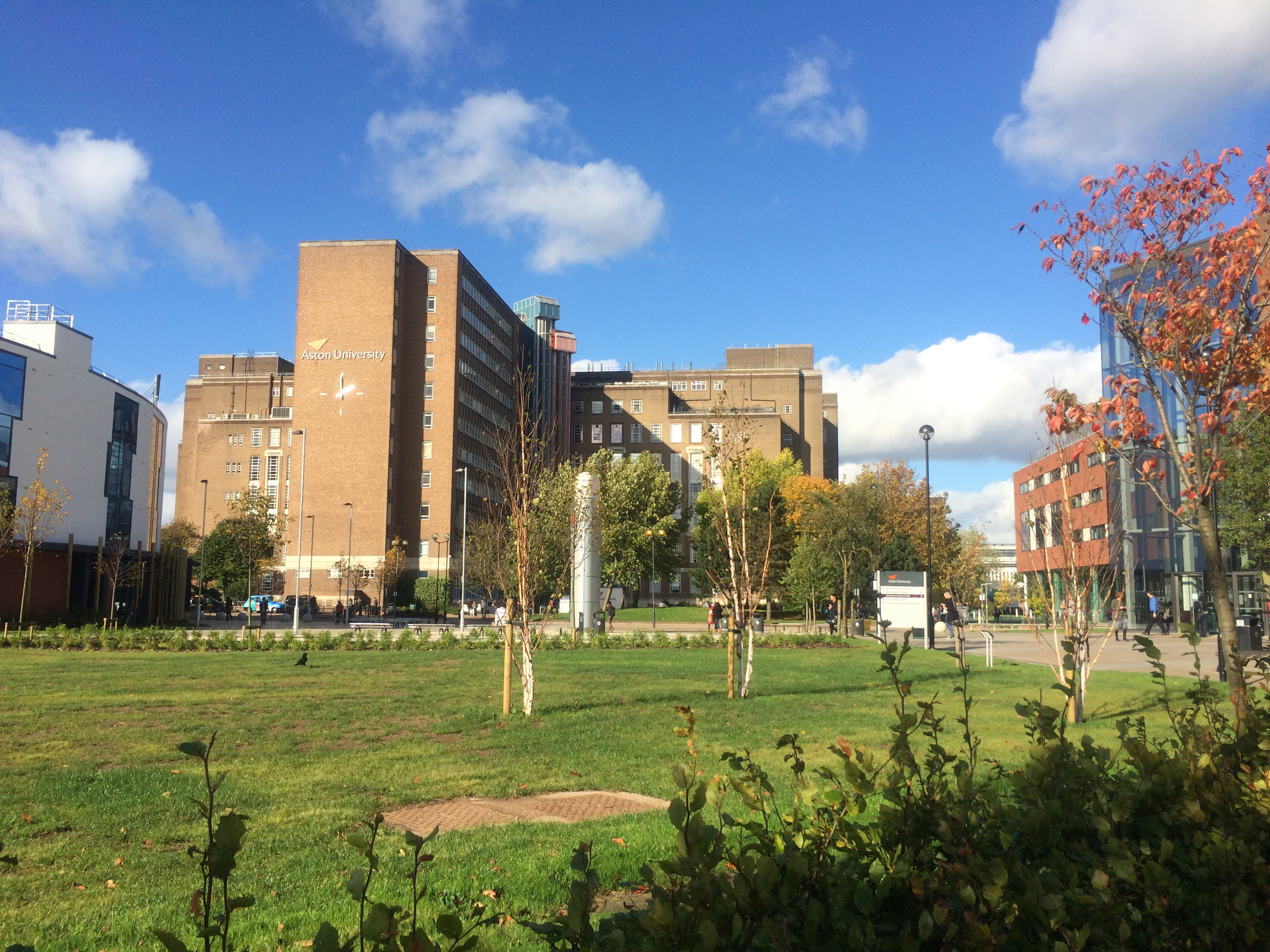
Aston's self-contained green campus, in the city centre of Birmingham

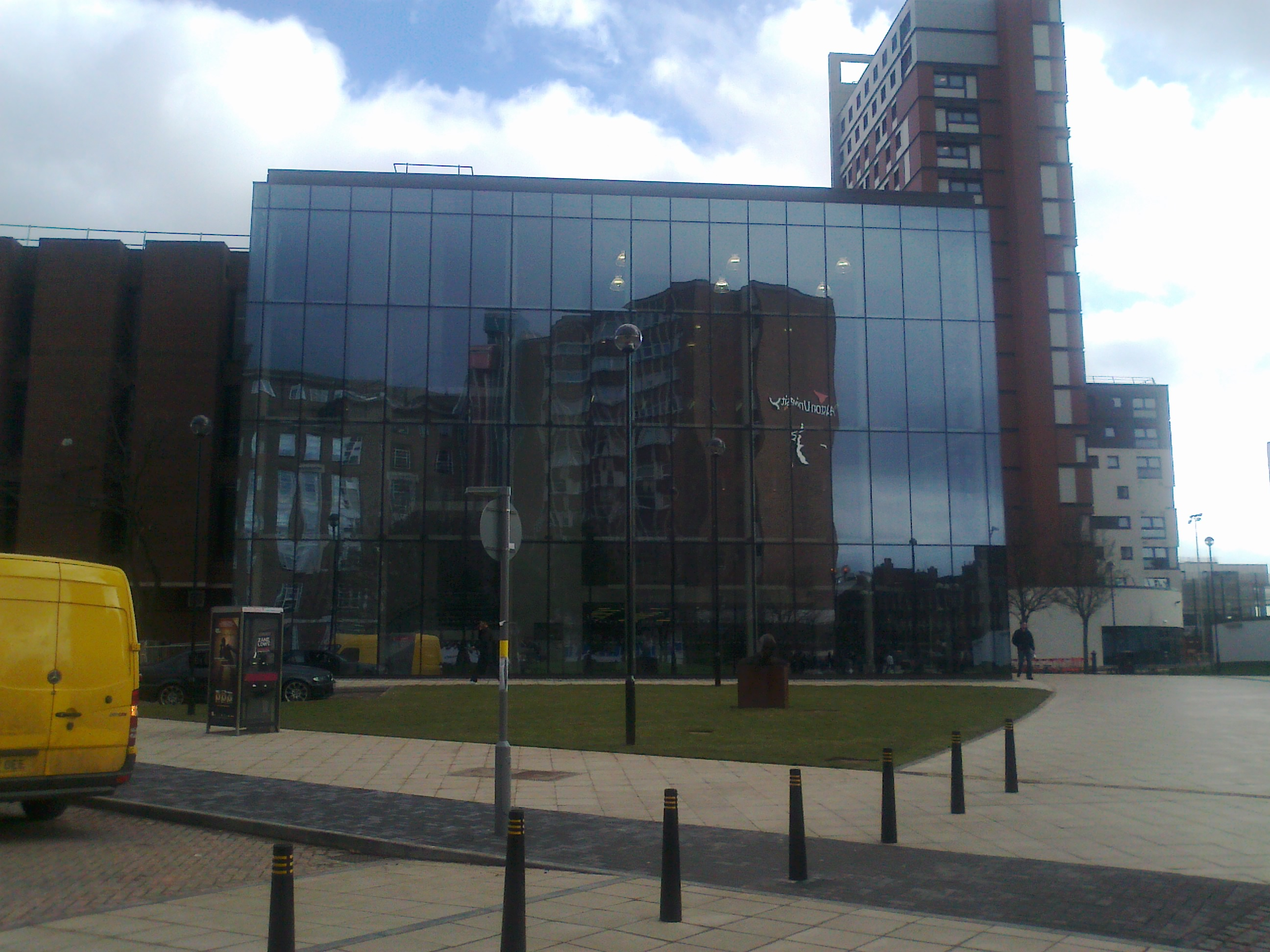
Aston University Library.

Established in 1895 as the Birmingham Municipal Technical School, The university is situated on a 60-acre campus at Gosta Green, in the city centre of Birmingham, England. As well as being home to over 3,000 students, the Aston University campus has the following amenities available: sports centres, swimming pool, 120 station gym, library, cafés, restaurants, pubs, shops, travel centre, hairdresser, health centre, dentist, places of worship, opticians, a bank, automated teller machines and plenty of outside space.

Aston University Library is on four floors and contains over 250,000 books, 800 current printed periodicals and has over 700 reader places. It provides online access to over 40 electronic databases and more than 3,400 electronic journals. The library is open 24 hours a day to Aston students and staff during exam time, and on average, around 12 hours a day during term time.

Around the campus there are also various open-access IT suites, offering computer and internet access 24 hours a day, seven days a week. They offer access to a range of software packages, database systems and computer-aided learning materials.

=== Sports ===
The Aston's sports facilities include a 25 m swimming pool, sauna and steam room, two sports halls, 120-station gym, weights and fitness rooms, two-storey dance studio and 35 sports clubs. The campus also has two 3G floodlit sports pitches. Clubs train and compete, many in the British Universities and Colleges Sports (BUCS) Leagues. Off campus the university manages a 40-acre sports ground with floodlit pitches, pavilion for all outdoor sports.

== Organisation and administration ==
During 2020, Aston restructured its schools into three colleges, notably merging the School of Languages and Social Sciences with Aston Business School, and Aston Medical School with the School of Life and Health Sciences. The resulting colleges, schools, and departments are as follows:

=== College of Business and Social Sciences ===
- Aston Business School
  - Accounting
  - Economics, Finance, and Entrepreneurship
  - Marketing and Strategy
  - Operations and Information Management
  - Work and Organisation
- School of Law and Social Sciences
  - Aston Law School
  - Communication and Culture
  - Society and Politics

=== College of Engineering and Physical Sciences ===
- School of Computer Science and Digital Technologies
  - Electrical and Computer Engineering
  - Mathematics and Data Science
  - Computer Science and Cybersecurity
  - AI and Robotics
- School of Engineering and Technology
  - Mechanical Engineering and Design
  - Biomedical Engineering
  - Aston Foundation Centre
  - Aston Professional Engineering Centre
- School of Infrastructure and Sustainable Engineering
  - Chemical Engineering and Applied Chemistry
  - Engineering Systems and Supply Chain Management
  - Civil Engineering

=== College of Health and Life Sciences ===
- School of Biosciences
- Aston Medical School
- School of Optometry
- Audiology and Healthcare Sciences
- Aston Pharmacy School
- Neuroscience
- School of Psychology

=== Coat of arms ===
The university's arms were granted on 18 March 1955 by Garter, Clarenceux and Norroy and Ulster kings of Arms to the Birmingham Corporation, for use by the former College of Technology. They were designed to show the college's connection with the city and with the teaching of technology. The arms consist of a shield and crest. The shield has two sections – the field (the main background) which is coloured blue and a chief (the broad band across the top of the shield) of silver. On the field is a diagonal line of five gold diamonds joined one to the other, similar to the first quarter of the Arms of the City of Birmingham and incorporated in the Arms of the college to show its connection with the city. This was adopted by the family of Birmingham which derived its name from the then hamlet of Birmingham, and provided the Lords of the Manor from the fourteenth to the sixteenth centuries. On the chief is depicted an open book bound in red placed between two black hammers, showing the connection of the university with technology, the book representing learning and the hammers engineering and allied trades.

The crest is also designed to stress the pursuit of knowledge. It consists of a red torch held erect by a forearm between two branches of gold laurel. Having been originally worn on the helmet of a fully armed person, the crest is always placed on the top of the helm. The method of joining the crest to the helm was usually concealed by decoration and, in the university's arms, this is effected by the use of a wreath and a crown. The wreath is silver, red and black, these colours being taken from the shield. It is surmounted by a mural crown (resembling a wall), which is reserved in modern grants for persons and organisations connected with public corporations. The cloth mantling which hangs down from the top of the helm is the survival of the cloak which was originally worn to protect the armour, coloured in the two principal colours of the shield, blue and gold.

In 2016, to mark the 50th anniversary of the university, Her Majesty's College of Arms granted the favour of supporters to Aston University's arms, following a request from the Vice-Chancellor, Julia King, the Baroness Brown of Cambridge. On 29 September, during a service at St Phillips Cathedral, The Letters Patent was formally presented to Aston University by the York Herald, Michael Peter Desmond O'Donoghue Esq.. The arms are supported by a Canada goose and a red squirrel. The Canada goose represents the family of geese living on the university campus. The squirrel is the crest of the arms of Aston Manor and is a rebus. (The picture is a pun on the persons name. The owners of Aston Manor were the Holte family and a squirrel's nest is called a holt). This explains the ancient connection between the squirrel and Aston. The animal also appears on the university mace and on the chancellor's chain of office. This chain was originally the property of the mayor of Aston Manor. The gorse around the animals' necks is a reference to Gosta Green. During the 18th century, it was known as Gostie Green, this combined the name of the landowner (William de Gorsty) with the local plant called 'gorse'.

=== Academic dress ===
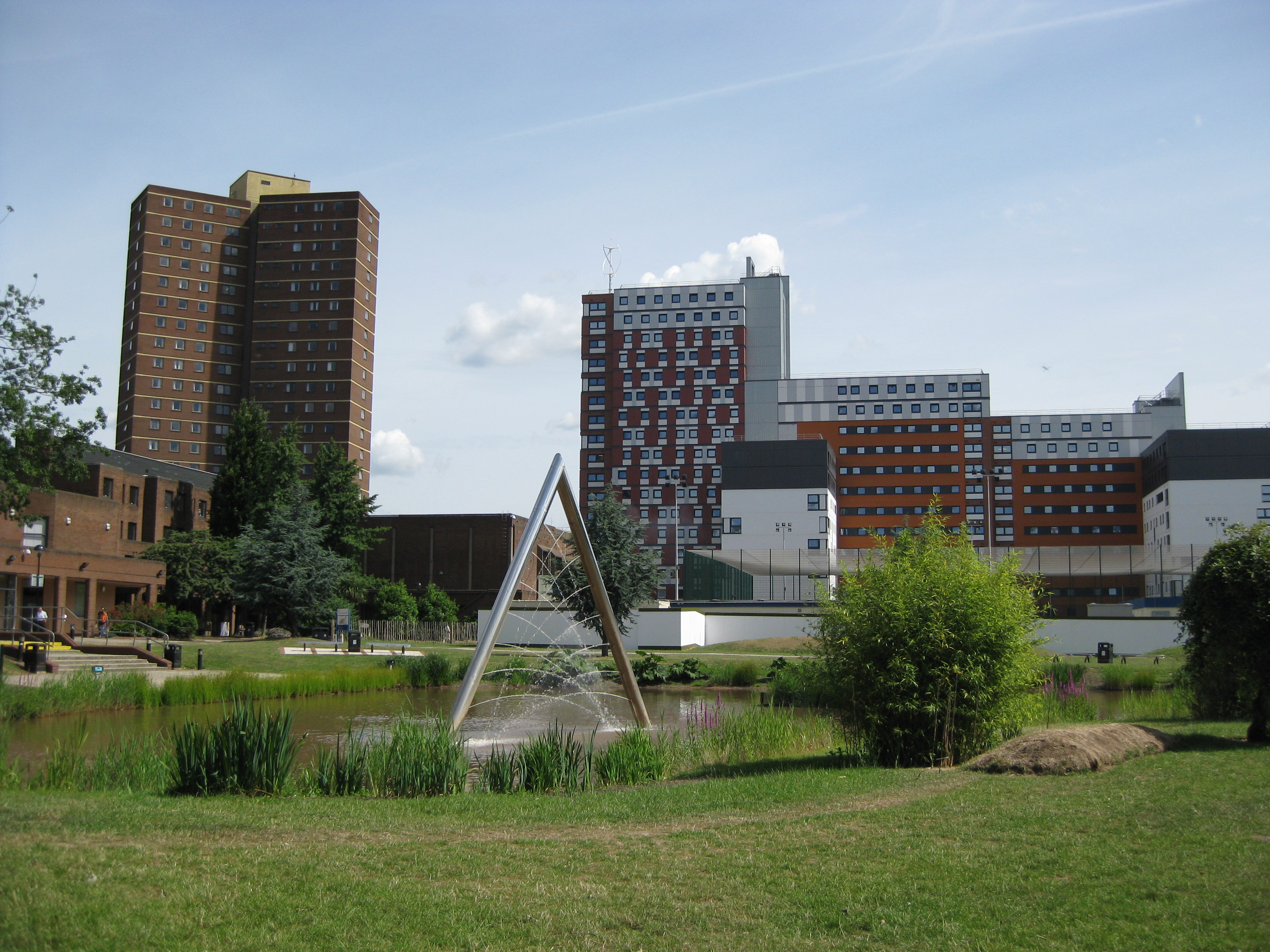
The Chancellor's Lake at the heart of the campus with triangular fountain in 2010.

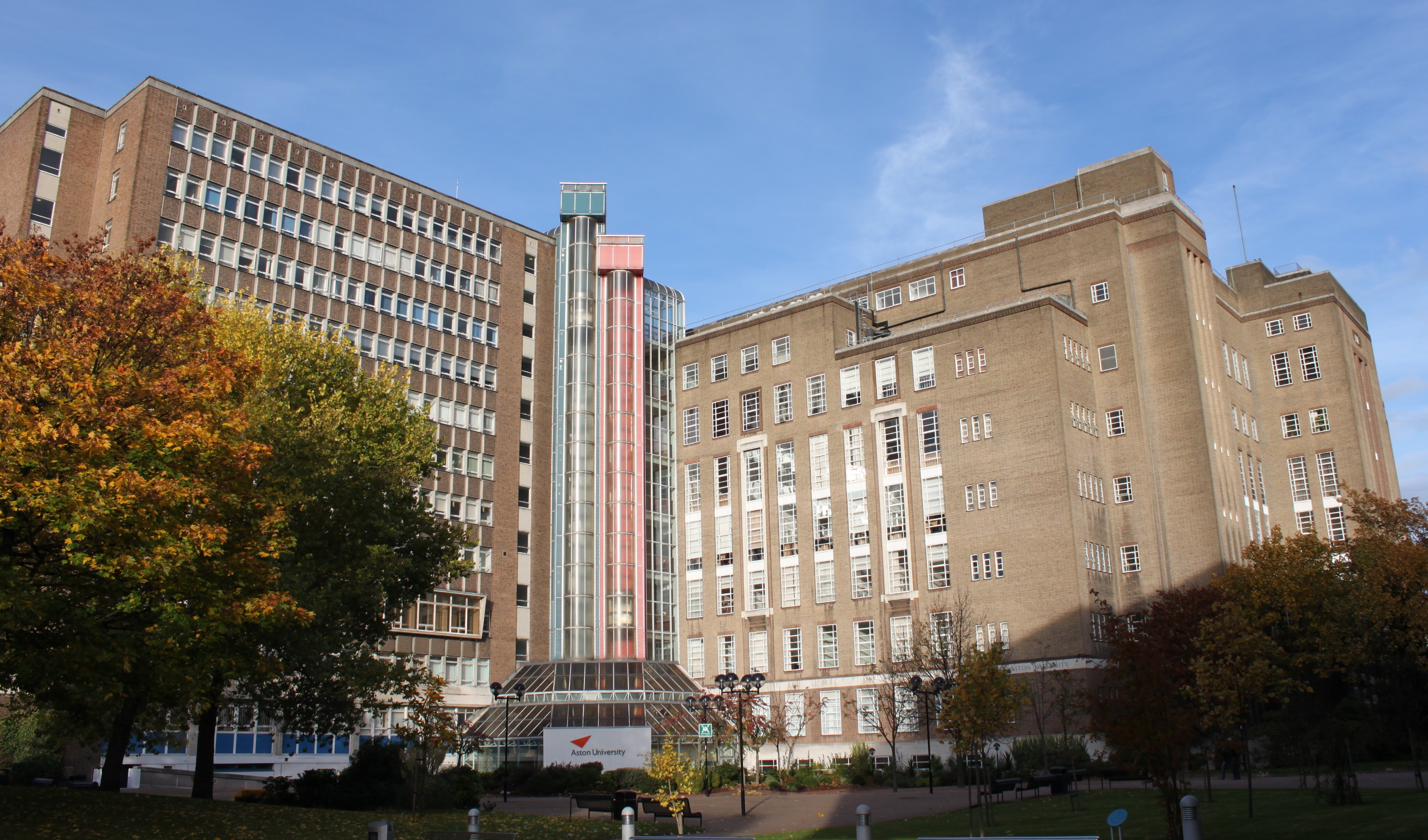
Aston University Main Building.

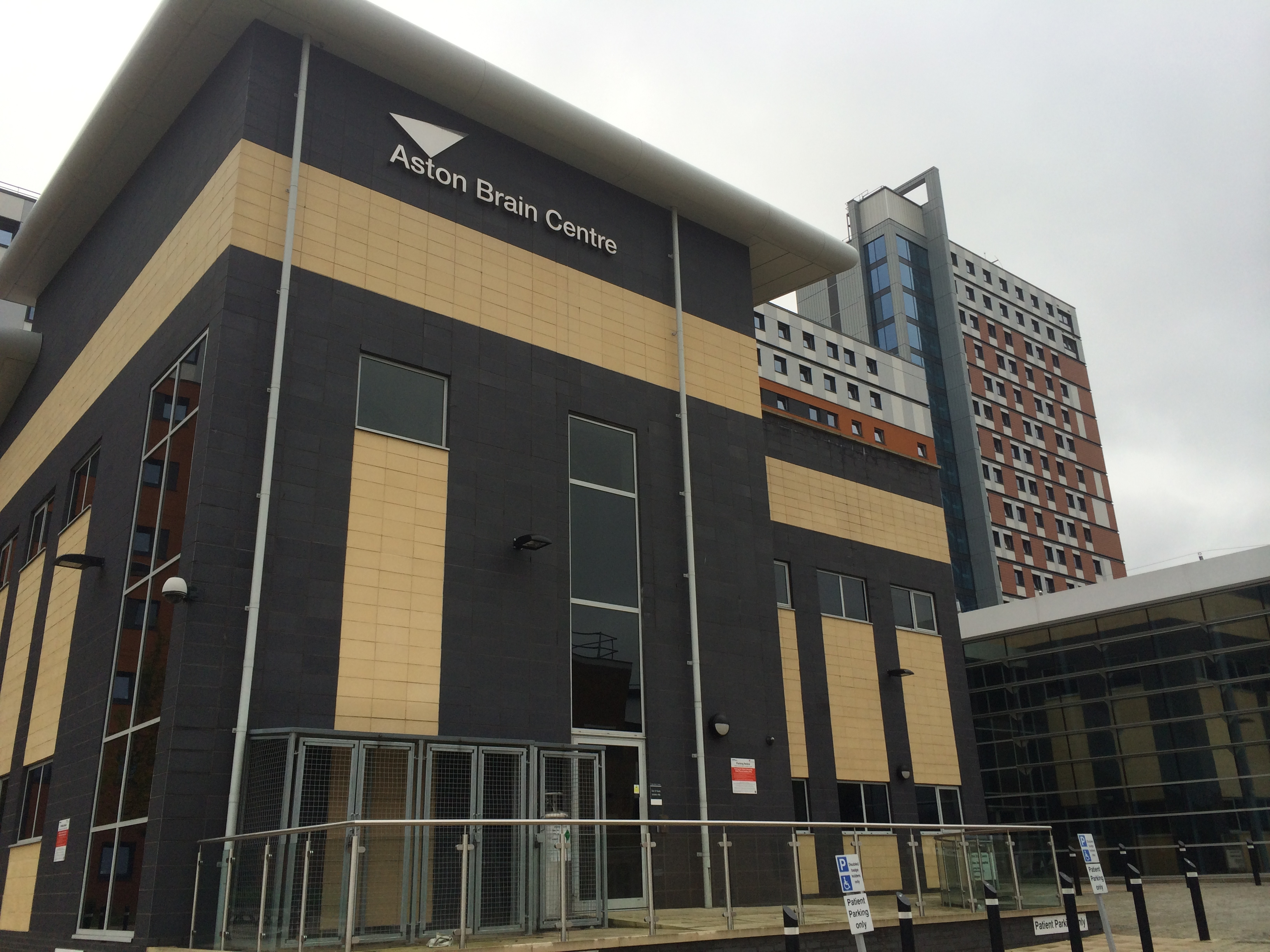
Aston Brain Centre.

The academic dress for graduates of the university is as follows:

- Bachelor of Science, Bachelor of Engineering and Master of Engineering
  - Gown: Black stuff of special design, having coat-type sleeve, narrow facings which continue round the neck and with extra wide gathers round the back
  - Hood: Black stuff, modified simple shape, faced inside for three inches with University lining
  - Hat: Black mortar board
- Master of Science
  - Gown: Black stuff of special design, having coat-type sleeve, narrow facings which continue round the neck and with extra wide gathers round the back
  - Hood: Black stuff, modified simple shape, fully lined with University lining
  - Hat: Black mortar board
- Master of Philosophy
  - Gown: Black stuff of special design, having coat-type sleeve, narrow facings which continue round the neck and with extra wide gathers round the back
  - Hood: Blue stuff, modified simple shape, fully lined with University lining
  - Hat: Black mortar board
- Doctor of Philosophy
  - Gown: Claret colour cloth robe, having coat-type sleeve, narrow facings which continue round the neck and with extra wide gathers round the back
  - Hood: Modified simple shape, in University Red stuff, faced inside for three inches with University lining
  - Hat: Black cloth bonnet with cord and tassels of University Red
- Doctor of Science
  - Gown: Same shape as for Doctor of Philosophy but in University Red, with facings on collar of university lining and gold cuffs on sleeves
  - Hood: Same shape as for Doctor of Philosophy but of gold silk and fully lined with University lining
  - Hat: Black velvet bonnet with cord and tassels in gold

== Academic profile ==
=== Rankings and reputation ===
Rankings
National rankings
- Complete (2027): 52
- Guardian (2027): 71
- Times / Sunday Times (2027): 49

Global rankings
- QS (2027): 416=
- THE (2026): 401–500

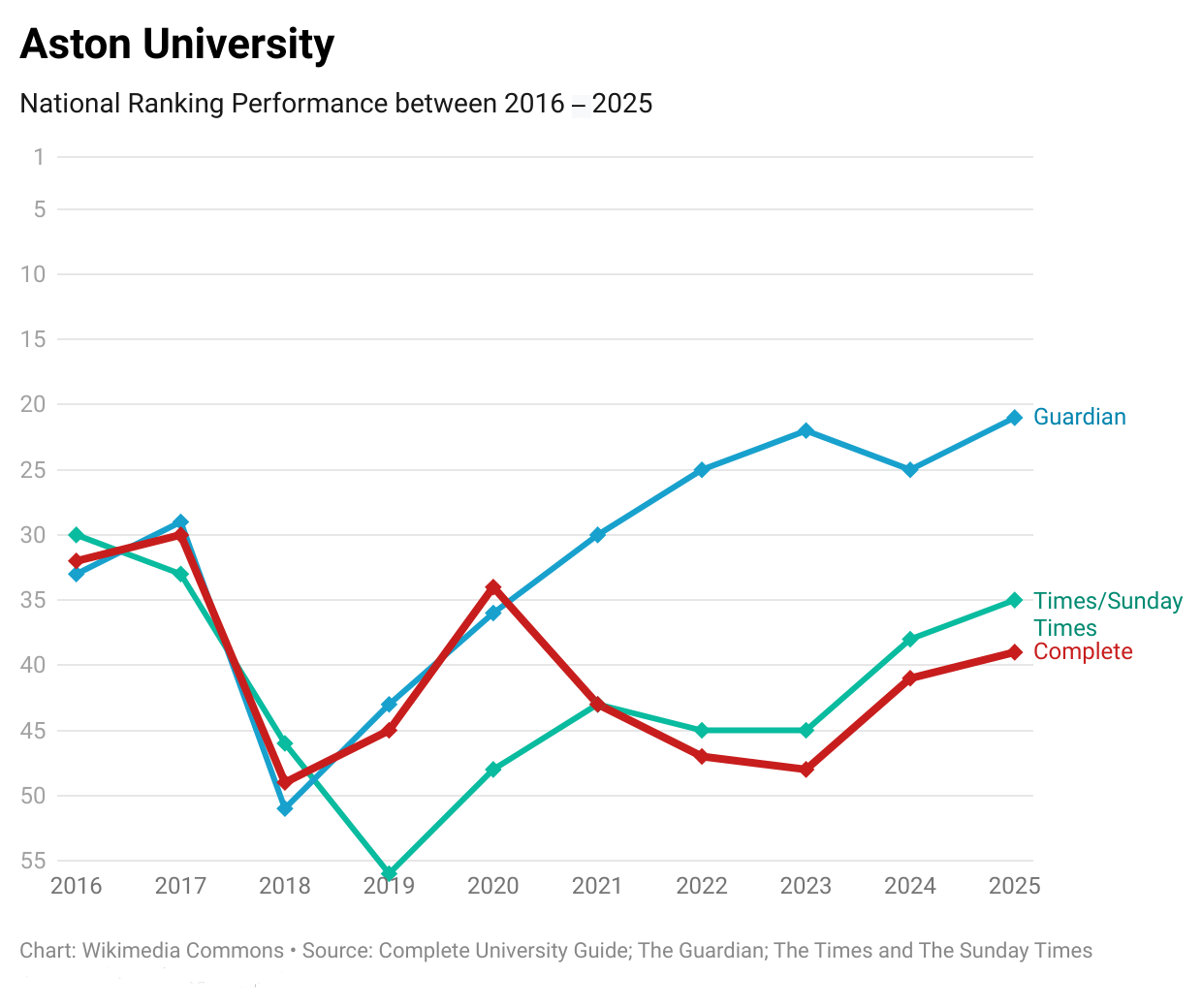
Aston University's national league table performance over the past ten years

Aston University was ranked 48th of UK institutions in the 2026 Guardian University Guide (a drop of 27 places from 2025).

Aston University holds an overall Gold rating as part of the UK Government's 2023 Teaching Excellence Framework. The framework evaluates universities on criteria including teaching quality, learning environment and student outcomes, taking into account factors such as student satisfaction, retention rates and employment.

Many factors make up the overall League Table rankings; Aston prides itself on consistently strong performances for the metrics related to student outcome successes. For example, in the 2021 Guardian University Guide Aston are ranked 11th in the UK for ‘Continuation’ which measures the proportion of students that drop-out of university following their first year. The 2021 Guardian Guide also ranks Aston joint 24th in the UK for ‘Value Added’ which compares student University grades against their expected grades based on entry qualifications.

In addition to this, the 2021 Times/Sunday Times Good University Guide ranks Aston University 31st in the UK for the proportion of students achieving a 1st or 2:1 degree classification, and the same publication ranks Aston 30th in the UK for ‘Graduate Prospects’, based on the proportion of graduates in a professional level job or further study within 15 months of graduation.

In addition to these immediate successes of Aston's students and graduates, there is also evidence of strong long-term benefits of Aston degrees, as the 2020 Longitudinal Education Outcomes study found that Aston graduates had the 15th largest median salary of all UK institutions 5 years after graduation.

=== Research ===
In the latest 2021 Research Excellence Framework, which assesses the quality of research in UK higher education institutions, Aston is ranked joint 58th by GPA and 56th for research power (the grade point average score of a university, multiplied by the full-time equivalent number of researchers submitted). In the 2008 Research Assessment Exercise (RAE), 88% of Aston academic staff were submitted for research assessment, one of the highest proportions in the UK. According to the RAE, the university's strengths include Business and Management, General Engineering, Subjects Allied to Medicine (Optometry, Biology, Pharmacy and Psychology), Languages and European Studies.

=== Admissions ===
UCAS Admission Statistics
| | 2022 | 2021 | 2020 | 2019 | 2018 |
|---|---|---|---|---|---|
| Applications (Note: Main scheme applications, International and UK) | 23,685 | 20,230 | 18,730 | 17,120 | 14,140 |
| Accepted | 3,250 | 3,520 | 3,585 | 3,465 | 3,000 |
| Applications/Accepted Ratio | 7.29 | 5.75 | 5.22 | 4.94 | 4.71 |
| Offer Rate (%) (Note: UK domiciled applicants) | 70.8 | 81.7 | 81.0 | 82.5 | 82.7 |
| Average Entry Tariff | —N/a | 133 | 133 | 124 | 126 |

New students entering the university in 2020 had an average of 133 points. According to the 2023 Times and Sunday Times Good University Guide, approximately 3% of Aston's undergraduates come from independent schools.

=== Aston Business School ===
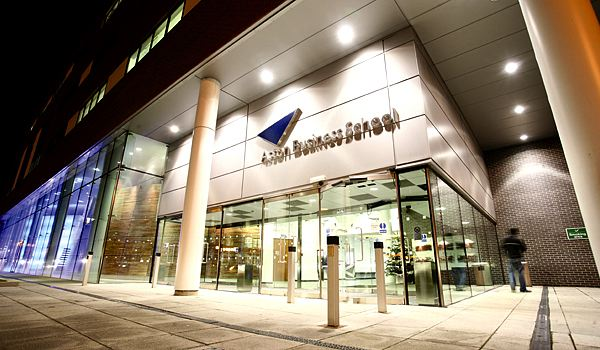
Aston Business School

Founded in 1947 Aston Business School (ABS) is one of the largest and oldest business schools in the UK. The school was ranked 8th in the UK and 33rd in the world by QS in 2012 and it is among the top 60 of business schools in the world to hold triple accreditation. ABS was the first UK business school to be awarded the prestigious EQUIS accreditation, in 1999. ABS is the first institution in the UK to be allied with Beta Gamma Sigma by establishing a BGS Collegiate Chapter. In 2006 it opened a new £22m extension including new study rooms and two new lecture theatres.

Aston University is currently top 100 in the World for Business and Management in the 2020 QS World Subject Rankings and top 200 for Accounting and Finance in the same publication.

The business school's Masters Management course was ranked by the Financial Times in 2012 as 5th in the UK, 33rd in Europe and 36th in the world. The paper also ranked Aston Business School as 4th in the world for careers in 2011. In the school's most recent Research Assessment Exercise in 2008, all research areas submitted ranked in the top 9 in the UK. 45% of the research submitted was judged to be "excellent" or "world-leading". Top 1% of Business Schools Worldwide with Triple Accreditation from AMBA, AACSB and EQUIS World Top 100 Universities for Business and Management Studies by QS Ranking (2019).

Aston is 2nd in the UK for developing marketing professionals and 7th in the UK for finance professionals, based on the career outcome data of more than 313+ million LinkedIn members. The university was also 23rd in the UK for accounting professionals. According to the Complete University Guide 2016, Aston is ranked 6th for marketing, 22nd for accounting and finance, 22nd for economics and 23rd for business and management studies in the UK.

== Student life ==
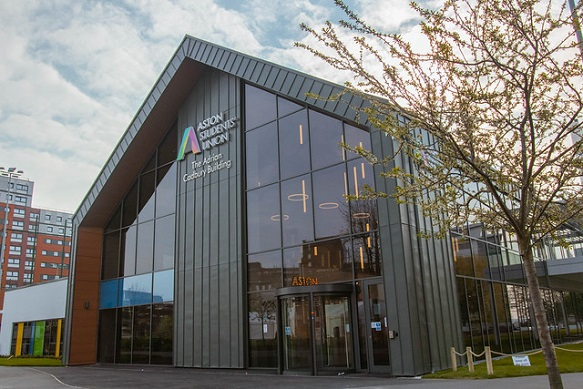
The Adrian Cadbury Building, Aston Students' Union new home since 2019.

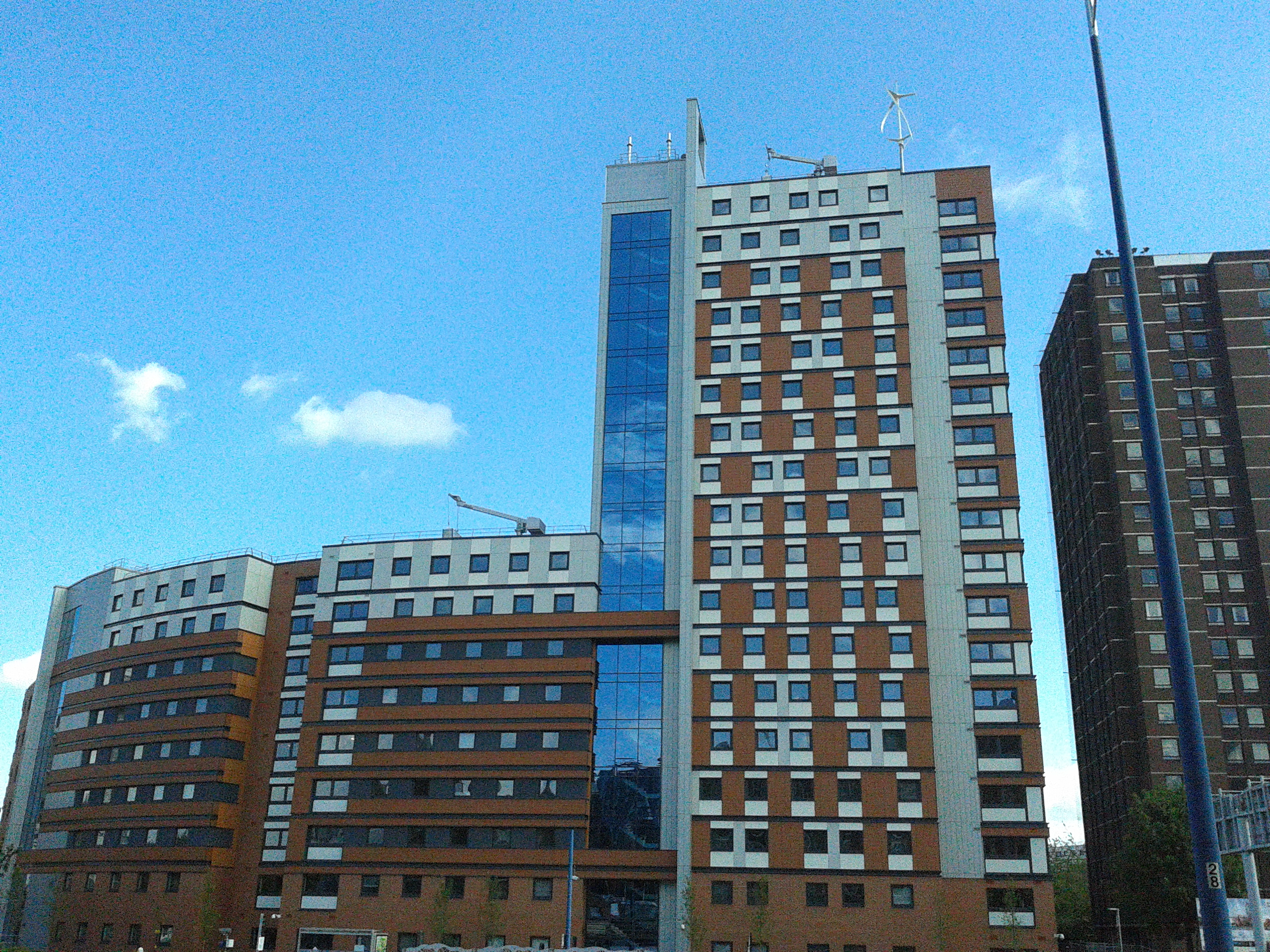
Aston Student Village completed in August 2013.

=== Students' Union ===
Aston Students' Union (SU) (formerly Guild) is a non-profit, independent charity set up with the aim of representing and supporting its members who are primarily current students at Aston University. The SU operates a number of commercial and non-commercial services including; the Advice & Representation Centre (ARC), the Aston Athletic Union which supports the university sports clubs, the Aston Societies Federation which supports a large number of non-sporting societies, the SU Shop, Copyshop and B4 Bar. The SU is funded by grant income from Aston University and by funds raised by the SU's commercial services. The SU is led by a Trustee Board consisting of elected students and external trustees. Day-to-day management is by a team of permanent staff and by an elected student team called the Executive Committee. The SU building consists of 5 floors and is located in the centre of the Aston University Campus. The Union received a block grant of over £2.1 million from the university in 2022.

On 29 November 2006, the students voted to disaffiliate the Guild (now Union) from the National Union of Students, but voted to re-affiliate on 26 November 2014.

=== Student housing ===
All of the student housing that Aston owned was sold to UNITE Students in 2016. In the 1970s, three tower blocks containing student accommodation were constructed on Aston University campus; Dalton, Lawrence and Stafford Towers. In April 2007, Aston University submitted a planning application for demolition of the three 1970s towers and to replace them with new student accommodation blocks as well as apartments for tutors, retail units and administrative offices. Lawrence and Dalton Towers were demolished on 8 May 2011. Stafford Tower, Gem Sports Centre and Lakeside Conference Centre were demolished on 27 April 2014 to make way for a new entrance to Aston University and a five-acre green space. The new landscaped area includes a new walkway into the university from the city centre and a pavilion, to be used for teaching and as a catering facility for outdoor events. The new buildings are named the William Murdoch, the James Watt, the Harriet Martineau and the Mary Sturge Residences.

Another addition to Aston University student dwelling stock is the Lakeside complex on campus which was completed in August 1999.

== Notable people ==
=== List of chancellors ===
- Lord Nelson of Stafford (May 1966 – September 1979)
- Sir Adrian Cadbury (September 1979 – September 2004)
- Michael Bett (September 2004 – May 2011)
- John Sunderland (May 2011 - June 2024)
- Dr Jason Wouhra (since June 2024)

=== List of vice-chancellors ===
- Peter Venables (academic administrator) (April 1966 – July 1969)
- Sir Joseph Pope (August 1969 – September 1979)
- Sir Frederick W. Crawford (July 1980 – August 1996)
- Michael T. Wright (September 1996 – November 2006)
- Dame Julia King (November 2006 – September 2016)
- Alec Cameron (September 2016 – December 2021)
- Aleks Subic (August 2022 – present)

=== Lecturers ===
- Geoffrey Vernon Ball – The first full-time lecturing professor of ophthalmics, (1948–1981)

=== Alumni ===
Academia and science

- Andrew Campbell, computer scientist
- Stewart Clegg, Australian sociologist
- Paul Drayson, Baron Drayson, vaccine manufacturer and Minister of State for Science, Drayson Racing driver
- Veronica German, scientist, Member of the National Assembly for Wales
- Abdollah Jassbi, President of Azad University
- Rahul Potluri, founder of ACALM, doctor, researcher, scientist
- Adam Ryland, British programmer
- Kevin Warwick, Professor of cybernetics and Deputy Vice-Chancellor (Research) at Coventry University
- Steve Wharton, British academic
- David Willey, American physicist and entertainer

Arts and media

- Frankie Boyle, Stand-up comedian, television presenter
- Laura Jones, BBC journalist
- Ivan Noble, BBC journalist
- Nic Robertson, Senior International Correspondent at CNN
- Kate Walsh, television presenter

Business

- Viswas Raghavan, CEO of J.P. Morgan EMEA
- Ben Francis, Founder and majority shareholder of Gymshark
- Adel Hassan Al A'ali, CEO and chair of Hajj Hassan Group
- Chris Banks, British businessman
- Tony Hayward, Former chief executive of BP Group
- Ravi Kant, Vice Chairman of TATA Motors, India
- Kevin Morley, Former Managing Director of the former Rover Group
- Rob Perrins, Managing Director of Berkeley Group Holdings
- Phil Popham, Global Operations Director for the global Jaguar Land Rover business
- Sir Arthur Smout, former Director-General of Ammunition Production for the British Armed Forces during the Second World War, and managing director of Imperial Chemical Industries metals group.

Politics

- Keith Bradley, Baron Bradley, Labour Party politician and life peer
- Anthony Cheung, Secretary for Transport and Housing in Hong Kong
- Simon D'Ujanga, State Minister for Energy in Uganda
- Malcolm Harbour, British politician
- Mohammad Nizar Jamaluddin, Former Chief Minister of the state of Perak
- Ashok Kumar, Labour Party politician
- Rachel Maclean, Conservative Party politician
- Terry Pitt, political adviser and former Member of the European Parliament
- Jeff Rooker, Baron Rooker, Labour Party politician
- Claire Curtis-Thomas, British Labour Party politician and former Member of Parliament
- Robert Walter, Conservative MP
- Salma Yaqoob, Leader and former vice-chairman of Respect – The Unity Coalition

Sports

- Rūta Bunkutė, IFBB/NPC Amateur fitness and figure competitor from Lithuania
- Gregor Townsend, Scottish and British Lions Rugby Union Player

Other

- Ernest Henry Wilson, notable plant collector and explorer
- Rick Stanton, cave diver.

== See also ==
- Armorial of UK universities
- Aston Centre for Europe
- College of advanced technology (United Kingdom)
- List of universities in the United Kingdom
