= List of University of Birmingham academics =

This is a list of notable academics related to the University of Birmingham and its predecessors, Mason Science College and Queen's College, Birmingham. This page includes those who work or have worked as lecturers, readers, professors, fellows, and researchers at Birmingham University. Administrators are included only in exceptional cases. Those who are/were academics of the university as well as alumni are included on the list of University of Birmingham alumni.

== Nobel Prize recipients ==
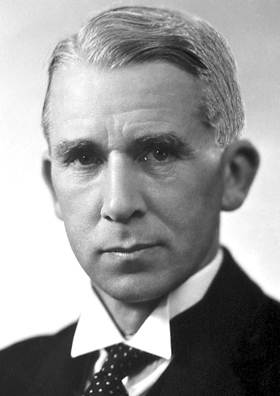
Nobel Prize winner Sir Norman Haworth

Sir Paul Nurse 2001 Nobel Prize in Physiology President of the Royal Society

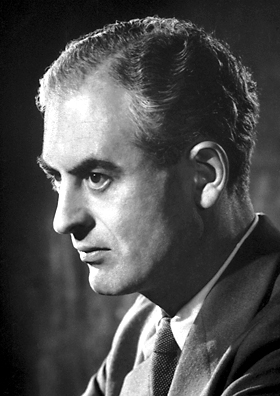
Nobel Prize winner Sir Peter Medawar

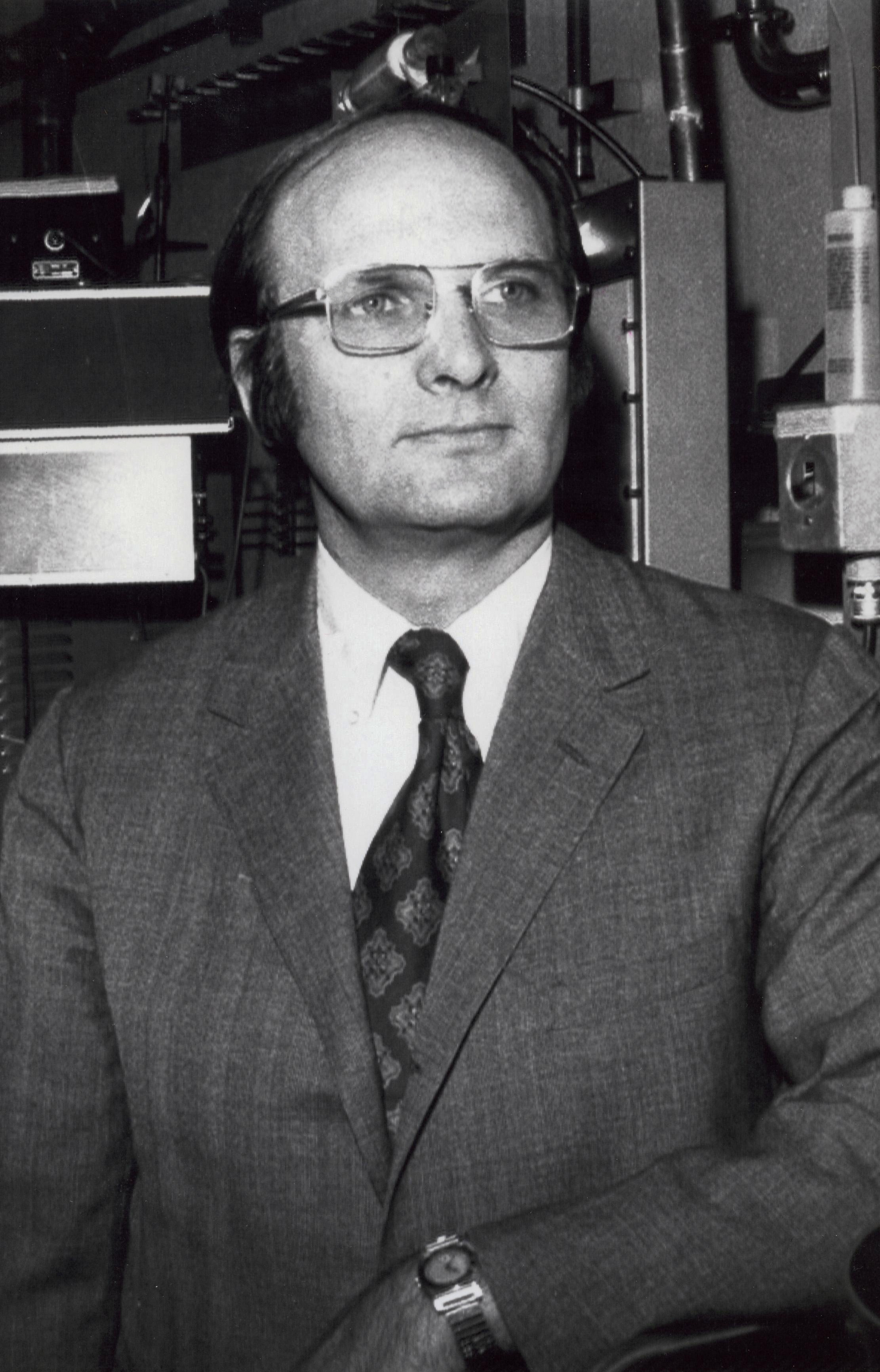
Nobel Prize winner John Robert Schrieffer

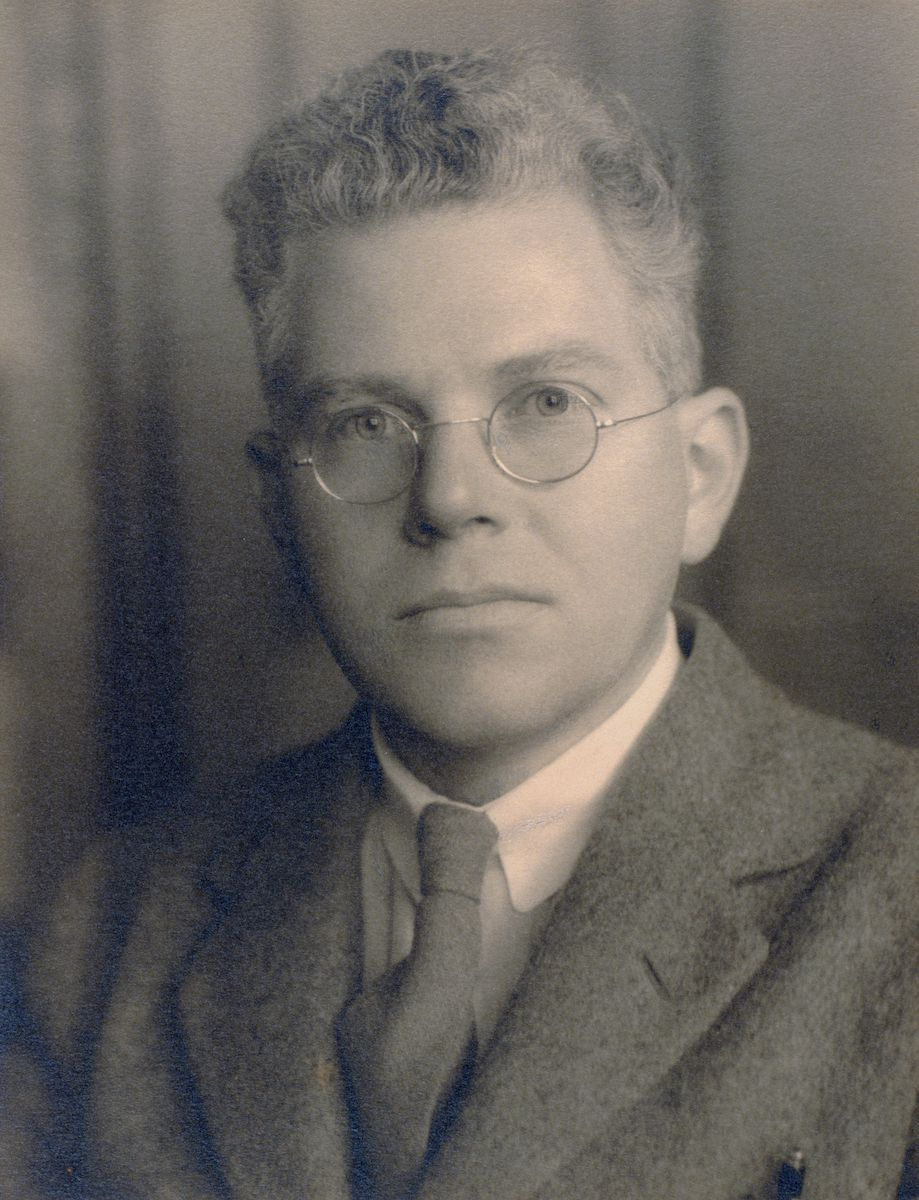
Sir Marcus Oliphant

| Name | Year | Prize | Affiliation | Reference |
|---|---|---|---|---|
| Robert Cecil, 1st Viscount Cecil of Chelwood | 1937 | Nobel Peace Prize | University Chancellor, 1918–1944 | |
| Sir Norman Haworth | 1937 | Nobel Prize in Chemistry | Professor, 1925–1948 | |
| Sir Peter Medawar | 1960 | Nobel Prize in Physiology or Medicine | Professor of Zoology, 1947–51 | |
| John Robert Schrieffer | 1972 | Nobel Prize in Physics | NSF Fellow at Birmingham University, 1957 | |
| David J. Thouless | 2016 | Nobel Prize in Physics | Professor of Mathematical Physics, 1965-1978 | |
| John M. Kosterlitz | 2016 | Nobel Prize in Physics | Fellow, 1970. Professor, 1974-1982 | |
| Fraser Stoddart | 2016 | Nobel Prize in Chemistry | Head of the School of Chemistry, 1990-1997 | |

== Science, engineering and medicine ==
=== Biology ===
- Rupert E. Billingham, former Chair in Zoology
- Jack Cohen, a reproductive biologist also known for his science books and involvement with science fiction.
- Steve Busby, Professor of Biochemistry, discovered some of the rules that govern how bacterial genes are expressed
- John Berry Haycraft, professor in Physiology at Mason Science College, discovered an anticoagulant created by the leech, which he named hirudin
- Lancelot Hogben, Professor of Zoology (1941–1947) and Professor of Medical Statistics (1947–1961)
- Sir Kenneth Mather, Professor of Genetics (1948), recipient of the 1964 Darwin Medal, later Vice Chancellor of the University of Southampton
- Laura Piddock, Professor of Microbiology, specialising in resistance to antibiotics
- Bryan M. Turner, Professor of Experimental Genetics
- Horace Waring, zoologist, head of the department of zoology (1946–1948) and recipient of the 1962 Clarke Medal of the Royal Society of New South Wales
- Richard Henry Yapp, botanist
- William Brunsdon Yapp, zoologist and author
- Solly Zuckerman, Baron Zuckerman, Professor of Anatomy (1946–1968) and chief scientific adviser to the British government (1964-1971)

=== Chemistry ===
- Leroy (Lee) Cronin, chemist, Regius Chair of Chemistry at the University of Glasgow
- Percy F. Frankland, chemist
- Sir Fraser Stoddart, chemist, researcher in supramolecular chemistry and nanotechnology, Professor of Chemistry (1990–1997)
- Sir William A. Tilden, Professor of Chemistry (1880–1894)
- Thomas Summers West, analytical chemist (1949–1963)

=== Engineering and computing ===
- Norman Percy Allen, metallurgist (1929–1933)
- Adrian John Brown, Professor of Malting and Brewing (1900–1928)
- Lord Cadman, mining engineer and petroleum technologist
- John Knott, Professor of Metallurgy and Materials, recipient of the 2005 Leverhulme Medal
- Sir Richard Redmayne, professor of mining 1902-08, first Chief Inspector of Mines
- Aaron Sloman, former Chair in Artificial Intelligence and Cognitive Science
- Thomas Turner, metallurgist
- Arnold Tustin, Professor of Engineering (1947–1955)

=== Geology ===
- Charles Lapworth, the first Professor of Geology at Mason Science College
- Sir Raymond Priestley, geologist, early Antarctic explorer, and Vice-Chancellor of the University of Birmingham
- Frederick William Shotton, geologist whose research into the geological makeup of Normandy beaches helped allied commanders decide which were the best to use on D-Day
- William Whitehead Watts, geologist
- Sir Alwyn Williams, geologist, Professor of Geology (1974–1976)

=== Mathematics and statistics ===
- Jonathan Bennett, Professor of Mathematics, recipient of the 2011 Whitehead Prize of the London Mathematical Society
- Nora Calderwood, Scottish mathematician and namesake of the Universities Calderwood Prize in mathematics
- Henry Daniels, statistician, the first professor of mathematical statistics (1957–1978), recipient of the Guy Medal in Gold in 1984
- Micaiah John Muller Hill, English mathematician, known for Hill's spherical vortex and Hill's tetrahedra
- Daniela Kühn, Mason Professor of Mathematics, recipient of the 2003 European Prize in Combinatorics and the 2014 Whitehead Prize of the London Mathematical Society
- Deryk Osthus, Professor in Graph Theory, recipient of the 2003 European Prize in Combinatorics and the 2014 Whitehead Prize of the London Mathematical Society
- Bill Parry, mathematician, lectureship at the university (1960–1965)
- Daniel Pedoe, mathematician, Professor of Mathematics (1942–1946)
- G. N. Watson, Professor of Mathematics from 1918 to 1951, recipient of the 1946 Sylvester Medal

=== Medicine ===
- Wiebke Arlt, current William Withering Chair in Medicine
- Sir Melville Arnott, former William Withering Chair in Medicine
- George Augustus Auden, former School Medical Officer and Lecturer in Public Health
- Ian Brockington, British psychiatrist
- Wilfrid Butt, former Honorary Professor of Endocrinology
- Melanie Calvert, epidemiologist
- John H. Coote, Bowman Professor of Physiology (1983-2004)
- William Sands Cox, surgeon and the founder of Queen's College, Birmingham
- Lord Ilkeston, physician
- Douglas Vernon Hubble, former chair in paediatrics and dean of the Faculty of Medicine
- Dierdre Kelly, Irish clinician
- Ian Calman Muir MacLennan, Professor of Immunology
- Dion Morton, Professor of Surgery
- Geoffrey Slaney, Barling Chair of Surgery
- Kenneth Walton, experimental pathologist and rheumatologist, former Professor of Experimental Pathology
- George Haswell Wilson, chair of pathology and Olympian
- Sir Bertram Windle, Dean of the Medical School

=== Physics ===
- David Charlton, Professor of Particle Physics, ATLAS Spokesman, CERN (2013-2017), recipient of the 2017 Richard Glazebrook Medal
- John Dowell, FRS, Nuclear physicist, Professor of Elementary Particle Physics (1980–2002)
- Freeman Dyson, physicist, teaching fellow (1949–1951)
- Yvonne Elsworth, Professor of Helioseismology and Poynting Professor of Physics, recipient of the 2011 Payne-Gaposchkin Prize
- Klaus Fuchs, theoretical physicist and atomic spy
- Sir Leonard Huxley, physicist
- J. Michael Kosterlitz, Research Fellow in high energy physics, 1970-1973; lecturer, 1974-1982; recipient of the 2000 Lars Onsager Prize
- Philip Burton Moon, former Professor of Physics, recipient of the 1991 Hughes Medal
- Sir Marcus Oliphant, Poynting Professor of Physics (1937–1950)
- Sir Rudolf Peierls, Professor of Mathematical Physics (1937–1943; 1945–1963), recipient of the 1986 Copley Medal
- John Henry Poynting, former Professor of Physics, recipient of the 1893 Adams Prize and the 1905 Royal Medal
- Sir John Randall, Royal Society fellow (1937–1943), worked on the cavity magnetron valve, recipient of the 1946 Hughes Medal
- James Sayers, physicist who played a crucial role in developing centimetric radar
- Tony Skyrme, former research fellow, recipient of the 1985 Hughes Medal
- David J. Thouless, Professor of Mathematical Physics from 1965 to 1978, recipient of the 2000 Lars Onsager Prize
- William Frank Vinen, Professor of Physics, recipient of the 1980 Rumford Medal

== Humanities, management and social sciences ==
Sir Willim Ashley

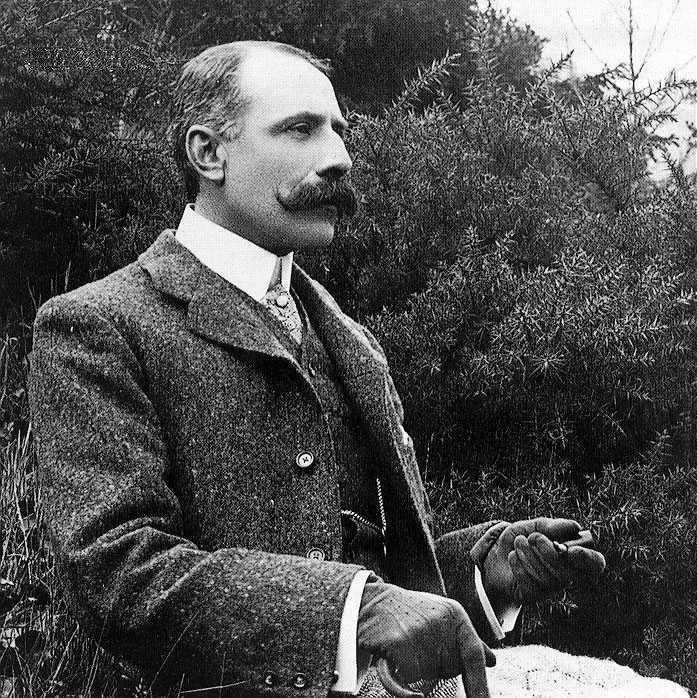
Sir Edward Elgar

Lord King

Sir Nikolaus Pevsner

- U.R. Ananthamurthy, academic and writer
- Edward Arber, academic and writer
- Sir William James Ashley, first Dean and the founder of the Birmingham Business School
- Sir Granville Bantock, Peyton Professor of Music, conductor and composer, co-founded City of Birmingham Orchestra 1920
- Karin Barber, Professor of African Cultural Anthropology and former Director of the Centre of West African Studies
- Andrew Barker, Professor of Classics
- Sir Charles Raymond Beazley, Professor of History
- Mark Beeson, former Head of the Department of Political Science and International Studies
- Sir Nathan Bodington, Professor of classics
- Lord Borrie, English lawyer, Labour Party life peer, law professor at Birmingham University
- Stewart Brown, Reader in African Literature and Director of the Centre of West African Studies
- Anthony Burgess, British novelist who taught in the extramural department (1946–50)
- Peter Burnham, Professor of Political Science and International Studies
- Winifred Cavenagh, Professor of Social Administration and Criminology
- John Churton Collins, former Professor of English Literature
- Reginald Cline-Cole, Senior Lecturer at the Centre of West African Studies
- Thomas Diez, Professor of International Relations Theory
- E. R. Dodds, Professor of Greek (1924–1936)
- Sir Michael Dummett, philosopher
- David Edgar, Professor of Playwrighting Studies
- Sir Edward Elgar, Professor of Music, composer
- John Fage, former Professor of African History, founder of Birmingham's Centre for West African Studies
- Hermann Georg Fiedler, German scholar
- David F. Ford, lecturer and senior lecturer of theology, 1976–1991
- Frank Hahn, lecturer in economics 1948-1960
- Stuart Hall, former Director of the Centre for Contemporary Cultural Studies
- Sir Keith Hancock, Australian historian
- William Haywood, Special Lecturer in Town Planning, architect and founder of the Birmingham Civic Society
- John Hick, emeritus H.G. Wood Professor of Theology
- Rodney Hilton, former Professor of Medieval History
- Richard Hoggart, founder of the Centre for Contemporary Cultural Studies and former Assistant Director-General of UNESCO
- A. G. Hopkins, historian
- Bill Hopkins, taught music at the University
- Susan Hunston, Professor in the Department of English Language and Applied Linguistics
- Mervyn King, Baron King of Lothbury, former professor in the Faculty of Commerce and Governor of the Bank of England
- Carenza Lewis, archaeologist
- Jeannette Littlemore, Professor in the Department of English Language and Applied Linguistics
- Jerzy Lukowski, Historian
- Sir Michael Lyons, Professor of Public Policy from 2001 to 2006
- Louis MacNeice, poet and playwright, lecturer in classics (1930–1936)
- Anand Menon, Professor of West European Politics and Director of the European Research Institute
- Jeremy Morris, Co-Director of the Centre for Russian, European and Eurasian Studies
- John Henry Muirhead, philosopher
- Allardyce Nicoll, Head of the English Department and founding director of the Shakespeare Institute
- Ronen Palan, Professor of International Political Economy
- Maureen Perrie, Professor Emeritus in Russian History
- Sir Nikolaus Pevsner, art historian who held a research post at the university for a number of years
- Owen Hood Phillips, Barber Professor of Jurisprudence, Dean of the Faculty of Law, Vice-Principal and Pro-Vice-Chancellor
- Philip Rahtz, British archaeologist
- Brinley Rees, lecturer in Classics (1970–1975)
- Sir Francis Richards, Director, Centre for Studies in Security and Diplomacy, former de facto Head of State of Gibraltar
- Nicola Rollock, Social Scientist and Race Equality Activist
- Alan S. C. Ross, Professor of English Language (1948–1951) and Professor of Linguistics (1951–1974)
- Ernest de Sélincourt, literary scholar and critic
- John McHardy Sinclair, Professor of Modern English Language, founder of the COBUILD project
- Ninian Smart, former Professor of Religious Studies
- Edward Adolf Sonnenschein, classical scholar and writer on Latin grammar and verse
- Colin Thain, Professor of Political Science
- Sir Alan Walters, Professor of Econometrics and Statistics (1951–1968) and Chief Economic Adviser to the former British Prime Minister Margaret Thatcher
- Sir Ellis Waterhouse, Barber Professor of Fine Art (1952–1970)
- Stanley Wells, Emeritus Professor of Shakespeare Studies and former Director of the Shakespeare Institute
- Tony Wright, lecturer in politics, 1975-1992, before being elected Labour Member of Parliament for Cannock and Burntwood
- Gordon Warwick, Reader in Geomorphology
- David Yardley, Barber Professor of Law (1974–1978)
- Ken Young, Professor and Director of the Institute of Local Government Studies (1987–1990)

== See also ==
- List of University of Birmingham people
- List of University of Birmingham alumni
