= Kenneth Walton =

Kenneth Walton may refer to:

- Kenneth Walton (pathologist) (1919–2008), British experimental pathologist and rheumatologist
- Kenneth Walton (geographer) (1923–1979), British geographer, vice principal of Aberdeen University
