= Birmingham Medical School =

Medical school in Birmingham, England

Coordinates: 52°27′7.3″N 1°56′17.3″W

Birmingham Medical School College of Medicine and Health
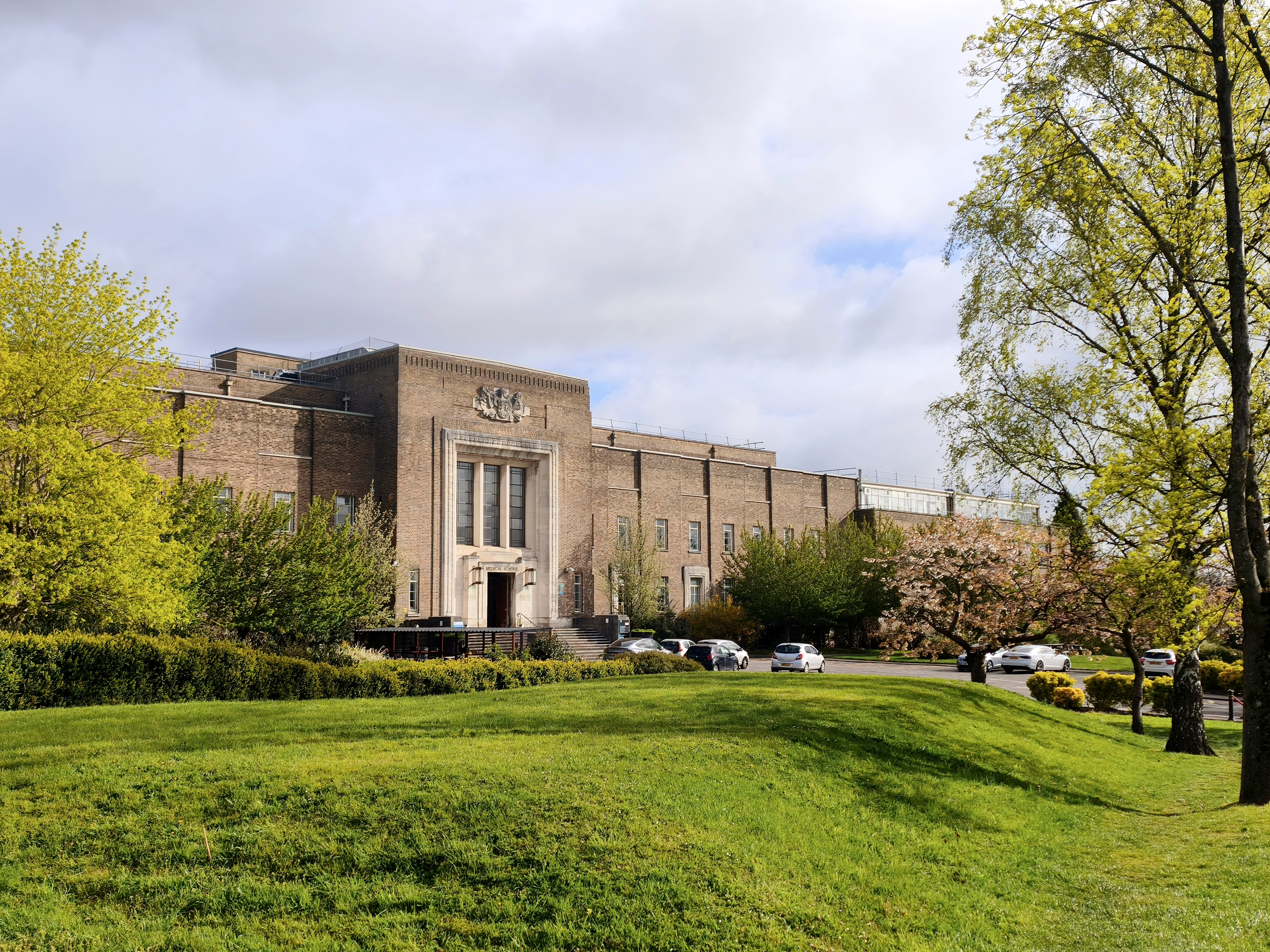
- Birmingham Medical School Building in April 2026
- Type: Medical School
- Established: 1825 – teaching by Sands Cox begins in Birmingham; 1767 – medical teaching began at the Birmingham Workhouse Infirmary
- Affiliations: University of Birmingham
- Dean: Beverley Tsai-Goodman
- Director: Beverley Tsai-Goodman
- Head of school: Gillian Condé
- Undergraduates: >2000
- Location: Birmingham, United Kingdom
- Website: www.birmingham.ac.uk/schools/medical-school

The University of Birmingham Medical School is one of Britain's largest and oldest medical schools with more than 400 medical, 70 pharmacy, 140 biomedical science and 130 nursing students graduating each year. It is based at the University of Birmingham in Edgbaston, Birmingham, United Kingdom. Since 2008, the medical school has been a constituent of the College of Medical and Dental Sciences.

== History ==
The roots of the Birmingham Medical School were in the medical education seminars of Mr. John Tomlinson, first surgeon to the Birmingham Workhouse Infirmary and later to the General Hospital. These classes were the first held in the winter of 1767–68. The first clinical teaching was undertaken by medical and surgical apprentices at the General Hospital, opened in 1779. Birmingham Medical School was founded in 1825 by William Sands Cox, who began by teaching medical students in his father's house in Birmingham. A new building was used from 1829 (on the site of what is now Snow Hill station). Students at this time took the licentiate/membership examinations of the Royal College of Surgeons of England, Royal College of Surgeons of Edinburgh and the Worshipful Society of Apothecaries.

In 1836, Earl Howe and a number of prominent local men submitted a memorandum to King William IV, and on 22 June a reply communicated His Majesty's acquiescence to become a Patron of the School to be styled the Royal School of Medicine and Surgery in Birmingham. There was serious need for a new teaching hospital and in 1839 Sands Cox launched an appeal. Sufficient money was raised within a year and the hospital built in 1840–41 was opened in 1841 by Sands Cox.

Queen Victoria who had granted her patronage to the Clinical Hospital in Birmingham also allowed the new teaching hospital to be styled "The Queen’s Hospital". In 1843, the medical school became Queen's College, and students became eligible to be considered for medical degrees awarded by the University of London.

A rival medical school, Syndenham College, opened in Birmingham in 1851. This merged with Queen's College in 1868 to form a new combined institution, and later merged with another institution, Mason Science College. In 1897, the Mason University College Act was passed, which made Mason Science College (incorporating Queen's College) into a university college, and this, in turn became Birmingham University in 1900, and MB ChB degrees were able to be awarded by the new university.

In 1966, an outbreak of smallpox originated at University of Birmingham Medical School. In 1978, Janet Parker contracted the disease while working as medical photographer in the anatomy department. She was the last known person to die of smallpox in the world.

== Facilities ==
The Medical School is based at the University of Birmingham Edgbaston campus. The current main building was constructed in 1938 as a wing of the old Queen Elizabeth Hospital, built to consolidate the city's 18th century teaching hospitals. After most of the Queen Elizabeth's inpatient clinical space moved to the new Queen Elizabeth Hospital following its opening in 2010, the remainder of the old hospital building is now used to run specialist clinical services, research centres and administrative space. The main medical school building houses two 450-seat lecture theatres, four additional lecture theatres, numerous small group teaching rooms, laboratory space for research and teaching, a clinical skills suite, student relaxation and study space, a prosectorium for cadaveric anatomy, and the Barnes medical library. A large refurbishment and extension of the medical school building took place in 2010 to a design by Scott Wilson and constructed by Architects Design Partnership. The scheme cost £8 million and consisted of the new Leondard Deacon lecture theatre, canteen and common room facilities.

In April 2016, the new Birmingham Dental Hospital and School of Dentistry was built, opening its doors after being moved from a city centre site that was near the Children's Hospital. It houses 600 undergraduate and postgraduate dental students, trainees and academics, and is equipped to treat more than 120,000 patients a year in areas including unscheduled emergency dental care, restorative dentistry, oral surgery, oral medicine, orthodontics and paediatric dentistry.

University of Birmingham students of medicine, biomedical science, pharmacy, dentistry, nursing and physiotherapy have access to special clinical resources within the Barnes Library and computer cluster within the medical school building. With the restructure of the university all these schools now come under the umbrella of the College of Medical and Dental Sciences.

== Courses and admission ==
MB ChB Medicine and Surgery is currently offered as a five-year course, or as a three-year course for qualified dentists wishing to train in maxillofacial surgery. The five-year course mostly consists of undergraduate students. The first two years (termed Phase I) cover basic science and are predominantly lecture based with extensive small group tutorials. Anatomy teaching is delivered by small group seminars, prosection and digital resources. The course is integrated, and Phase I students undertake fortnightly general practice days, clinical skills and communication skills training. Years three to five consist largely of clinical placements covering all major specialties in partner NHS Trusts and GP practices located in the West Midlands.

In 2003 the medical school started a four-year medicine course for graduates with an honours degree in life sciences. The first year of the graduate-entry course was of a problem-based-learning design, with students then joining the third-year students on the five-year course for clinical study. As of May 2024, the graduate-entry course has been discontinued but graduates are able to apply for the five-year course.

The medical school remains extremely competitive with high entry standards. Requirements for 2019 entry was A*AA at A Level.

Dentistry at Birmingham often receives many applications for each place available. With few spaces on the course, it is extremely competitive and candidates are expected to perform excellently at interview.

Pharmacy admissions accepted the first intake of students in August 2013, in the first year alone 1007 applicants applied for 70 available places. Requirements for current entry remain at AAB at A Level and A's in Maths and Science GCSEs. This course was accredited by the General Pharmaceutical Council (GPhC) in June 2017.

The BNurs Nursing degree allows students to specialise in Adult, Mental Health and Child and Public Health clinical settings. A new four-year undergraduate Master's degree in Nursing (MNurs) started in September 2018, which prepares students for management roles and clinical academic careers.

The School also offers a bachelor's degree in Biomedical Science (BSc), leading to further study at postgraduate level. Medical students may also intercalate, usually after their third or forth year, on a range of specialist Bachelor's and Master's-level programmes.

The College of Medical and Dental Sciences also offers Dental Surgery (BDS), Dental Hygiene and Therapy (BSc) and Biomedical Materials Science (BMedSc). These courses are based at the Birmingham Dental Hospital and School of Dentistry.

The College of Health Sciences at the University of Zimbabwe was modelled after the Birmingham Medical School. The two hence share and enjoy a special relationship.

== Clinical teaching partners ==
Clinical placements for medical students take place in a variety of secondary and tertiary referral hospitals and community general practices across the West Midlands. These include:

- Queen Elizabeth Hospital Birmingham
- Birmingham Children's Hospital
- The Royal Orthopaedic Hospital
- The Dudley Group NHS Foundation Trust
- The Royal Wolverhampton NHS Trust
- Heartlands Hospital, Birmingham
- Birmingham Women's Hospital
- Walsall Healthcare NHS Trust
- Birmingham and Midlands Eye Hospital
- Sandwell and West Birmingham Hospitals NHS Trust
- Birmingham and Solihull Mental Health NHS Foundation Trust
- Worcestershire Royal Hospital
- Wye Valley NHS Trust

== Medical Society ==
Students of Birmingham Medical School are entitled to be part of Birmingham Medical Society (MedSoc). Birmingham MedSoc contains various subsidiary sports teams, societies and charitable initiatives.

== Medical School Rugby Club ==
The oldest sports club in the medical school is the University of Birmingham Medical School RFC (UBMS RFC), founded in 1958. The club won the inaugural National Association of Medical Schools (NAMS) competition in 1994, and has appeared in many finals over the years. The club has also previously beaten the University of Birmingham Rugby Team (UBRFC) in the annual varsity match. The Medical School also has a Women's team, UBMSWRFC, founded in 1983. They won the inaugural NAMS competition in 2024.

== Medical School Hockey Club ==
University of Birmingham Medical School Hockey Club (UBMSHC) was established in 1973, and is the largest, in terms of membership, of all of the MedSoc sport societies. The club is mixed-gender and home to four teams, with the top two playing in NAMS tiers 1 and 2, respectively. UBMSHC has seen immense success with the 1s having been NAMS champions most recently in the 2021–2022 season while the 2nd team are reigning tier 2 champions.

== Bibliography ==
- J. T. J. Morrison (1926). William Sands Cox and the Birmingham Medical School. Birmingham: Cornish Brothers.
- A. P. Thomson (1957). A Short History of the Medical School, Birmingham, The Faculty of Medicine. A. P. Thomson (n.d.). History of the Medical School (as appeared annually in the Faculty Handbook)
