= Samuel William Langston Parker =

English surgeon

- Born: 1803; Birmingham
- Died: 27 October 1871 (aged 67–68)
- Occupation: Surgeon

Samuel William Langston Parker (1803 – 27 October 1871) was an English surgeon.

== Biography ==
Parker was the son of William Parker, a medical practitioner in the Aston Road, was born in Birmingham in 1803. He received his early education in the school of the Rev. Daniel Walton in Handsworth. He afterwards attended the medical and surgical practice of the Birmingham General Hospital, his more strictly scientific training being obtained in the school of medicine at the corner of Brittle Street, Snow Hill. He then came to London and entered St. Bartholomew's Hospital for the purpose of attending the lectures of John Abernethy. He afterwards went to Paris to complete his studies. He was admitted a member of the Royal College of Surgeons of England in 1828, and he became a fellow of that body honoris causâ in 1843, the year in which the fellowship was established. He assisted his father for a short time after he obtained his qualification to practise, but in 1830 he married and began to practise on his own account in St. Paul's Square, Birmingham.

Parker took a keen interest in the development of Queen's College, Birmingham, becoming, at an early period of its history, professor of comparative anatomy, and of descriptive anatomy and physiology—posts which he held for a quarter of a century. His services to the Associated Hospital date from the foundation of that important charity in 1840, and he discharged the duties of honorary surgeon for five-and-twenty years. On his retirement he became consulting surgeon, an appointment which he held till his death. He was also consulting surgeon to the Leamington Hospital for Diseases of the Skin. He was an active promoter for many years of the Birmingham Philosophical Institution in Cannon Street. In 1835–6 he delivered in this institution a remarkable course of lectures ‘On the Effects of certain Mental and Bodily States upon the Imagination.’

Parker began life as a general practitioner of medicine, subsequently he became a surgeon, and eventually devoted his best energies to the treatment of syphilis. In this department of practice he soon obtained a world-wide reputation; but, although he introduced new methods of treatment, he failed to advance the scientific knowledge of the disease.

Parker had a cultivated musical taste, was an enthusiastic playgoer, an accomplished French and a good Italian scholar. He died in Paradise Street on Friday, 27 October 1871, and was buried at Aston.

He was author of:

- ‘The Stomach in its Morbid States,’ 8vo, 1837. This work was subsequently condensed into
- ‘Digestion and its Disorders,’ 8vo, 1849.
- ‘The Modern Treatment of Cancerous Diseases,’ 4to, 1857.
- ‘Clinical Lectures on Infantile Syphilis,’ 1858.
- ‘The Treatment of Secondary Syphilis,’ 8vo, which reappeared in 1868 as
- ‘The Mercurial Vapour Bath,’ 8vo.
- ‘The Modern Treatment of Syphilitic Diseases,’ 1st edit. 1839, 2nd edit. 1845, 3rd edit. 1854, 4th edit. 1860, 5th edit. 1871.
