= Edward Smith (physician) =

British physician (1819–1874)

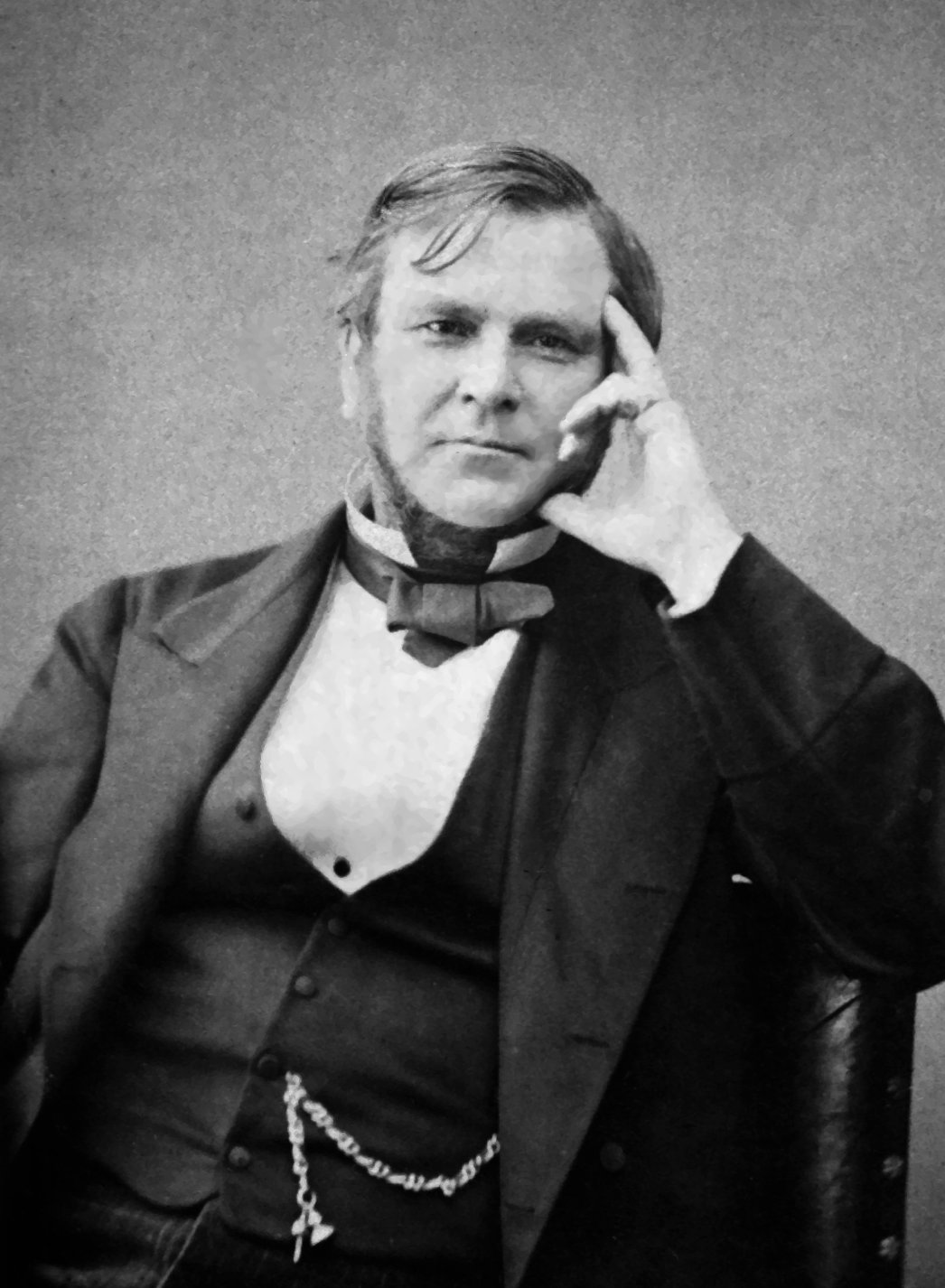
- Born: 1819; Heanor, Derbyshire
- Died: 1874
- Education: Queen's College, Birmingham (a predecessor college of the University of Birmingham)
- Occupations: physician and medical writer

Dr Edward Smith FRS (1819–1874) was a British physician and medical writer, born at Heanor, Derbyshire. According to his obituary, he failed to inspire the friendship of his colleagues, but more recent evaluations have noted that he "deserves to be better remembered by nutritionists, both for his contributions to the physiological basis of nutrition, and for his pioneering field surveys of dietary intake in relation to need among low income social groups". He worked out that prisoners who were fed on a diet of 93% carbohydrates would not be able to perform hard labour (and would therefore be more likely to resort to crime).

== Life ==
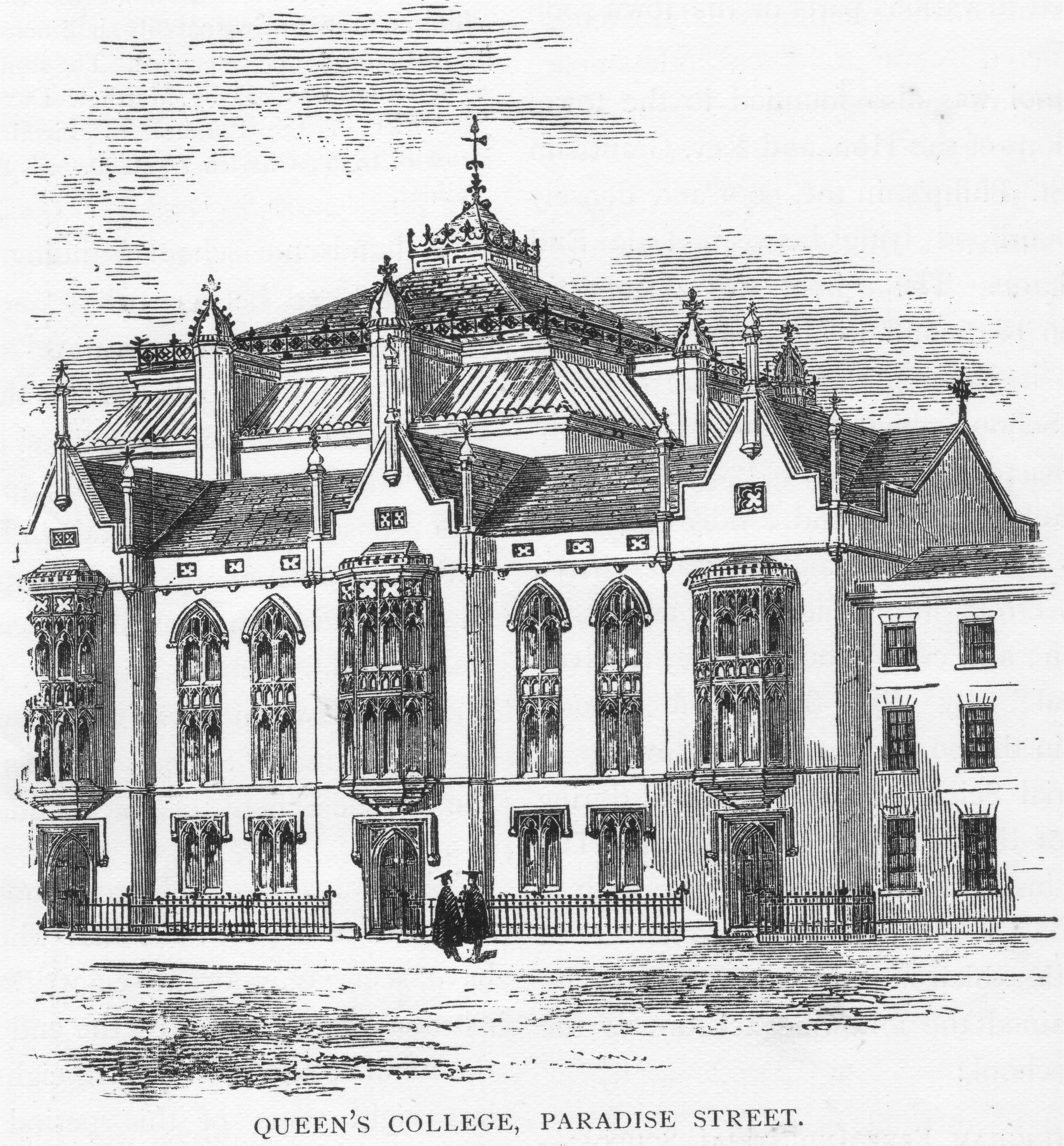
Queen's College, Birmingham, a predecessor college of Birmingham University

Smith was educated at Queen's College, Birmingham, (a predecessor college of the University of Birmingham), and graduated MB in 1841, MD in 1843, and BA and LLB in 1848.

"Register" (PDF). www.ulrls.lon.ac.uk. Archived from the original (PDF) on 4 March 2016. In the following year he visited north-east Texas, to examine its capacity as a place of settlement for emigrants, and published an account of the journey and a report with charts of temperature and the new constitution of the state (London, 1849). In 1851 he passed the examination for the diploma of fellow of the Royal College of Surgeons of England and in 1854 he became a member of the Royal College of Physicians, London, and in 1863 was elected a fellow of the college.

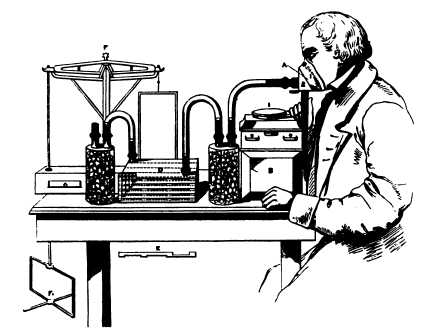
Apparatus that Edward Smith built to monitor the quantity of carbon dioxide exhaled by the human body

Physiological chemistry occupied much of his attention and he developed an early spirometer. In 1856 he read his first paper. Edward was very interested in the workings of the human body and would frequently take measurements of his own body temperature and pulse, sometimes over fifty times a day. He later became interested in the body's use of urea and again made over 1400 different observations. Meanwhile Smith, in 1853, held the office of lecturer and demonstrator of anatomy at the Charing Cross Hospital school of medicine, and was appointed in 1861 assistant physician to the Brompton Hospital for Consumption. In 1860 he was elected a Fellow of the Royal Society

In 1862 he published Consumption: its Early and Remediable Stages. He had previously published several papers on the pulse and the use of certain remedies in phthisis. Dietetics formed the subject of most of his subsequent literary work. He looked at the diet of prisoners, particularly those who were subjected to using a treadmill such as the one in Brixton prison. He decided to go to prison and join the others to investigate the diet in the prison system. He inspired two German researchers to investigate the prevailing idea that protein alone powered muscles. Adolf Eugen Fick and Johannes Wislicenus climbed the Swiss Alps after removing protein entirely from their diet. They were then able to balance the food they had consumed against the gain in potential energy. They were able to show as Smith had suggested that the chemical energy required for muscular effort does not come primarily from consumed protein but from fats and carbohydrates.

Edward Smith died of pneumonia in 1874.

His wife, Matilda Frearson, died in Edinburgh in 1895 and is buried in Dean Cemetery together with their daughter, Anna Maria Smith (1845-1925).

== Works (incomplete) ==
- Foods, 1873.
- A Manual for Medical Officers of Health, 1873; 2nd edit. 1874
- A Handbook for Inspectors of Nuisances, 1873, 8vo. 10.
- Health: a Handbook for Households and Schools, 1874
