= University of Birmingham Medical School RFC =

UBMSRFC
- Nickname: "Le Cloob"
- Founded: 1958
- Region: West Midlands
- Ground: Metchley Playing Fields
- Chairman: Benedict McGuinness
- Coach: Matt Mirecki
- Captain: Josh Froom
- Most tries: Chaz Hudson (50)
- League(s): MANES, NAMS
- 2026/27: TBC
Team kit	Change kit

Official website
- www.birminghammedicsrfc.com

University of Birmingham Medical School RFC (UBMSRFC), 'The Birmingham Medics' is an English Rugby Union club based in Birmingham who play in both the National Medical Schools Cup and the Midlands & North East Student Champions (MANES).

The club is formed primarily by medical and medical sciences students from the University of Birmingham, but also has numerous members studying other degree courses at the University of Birmingham.

The 1st XV has experience considerable success across its history, twice winning the National medical Schools Cup and twice beating the University of Birmingham 1st XV in the official Birmingham Rugby Varsity. They also won the inaugural MANES cup in 2024.

== History ==
Almost every Medical School in the United Kingdom has a rugby union team; some are as old as the game itself whereas others were formed much more recently. The rugby club at Birmingham Medical School was officially started in 1958 and is well established in both the sporting and social sides of Medical School life. However, there is evidence in the archives of a Medical School rugby team from 1921, however very little is known about this.

1958-1969

The Medical School rugby club, as it is known today, was founded in the 1958/59 season by Richard Donovan.

A second team was formed in 1961 when Arnold Gourevitch was president.

By the 1962/63 season a third team had been added and Dick Herbert had taken over the club captaincy. One of the seasons in the 60's was the best season for several years with the First XV winning 15 out of 23 fixtures with most of the games being close affairs. One such game against Cardiff Medics saw Birmingham win about 80% of the ball but still lost the game 5-3. Players that deserve a special mention from this season include Don Thompson and John Booth from the forwards and Barling and Kenyon, two prolific wingers, scoring almost 50 tries between them. The Second XV had a less successful season winning 5, drawing 2 and losing 9 with Tony Oakhill captaining the side. The 3rd XV was the most successful team of the season winning 12 out of 16 games and were captained by Andy Johnston. During this time many consultants gave much support to assist this newly formed rugby club. These included Professor McLaren, Professor Marsland, Paul Dawson Edwards, Jo Jordan and Brian Pentecost.

=== 1970s ===
During the 1970s the rugby team dropped back to running just two teams.

Two teams also played regularly in the 1977/78 season with both winning over half of their games. An AGM was held on the 17th May, where matters discussed included the impending arrival of 40 new tops.

=== The 1980s ===
The 1980s saw a resurgence of Medics RFC and coincided with the 25th anniversary in 1983.

Training during the 1980s was a regular event with four sessions a week. Monday night consisted of a run with intermittent sprints along roads near the university and then back to the running track for sprints. Tuesday and Thursday were optional circuit training sessions at the Munrow sports centre with Wednesday night for team training and the occasional game. This took place at Wast Hills and was also where the rugby with club played their home games on a Saturday.

The 1980s also saw the Medical Sickness Society Annual Medical School 7's, which unfortunately no longer takes place. It was the only way for provincial Medical Schools to take on their rivals from both London and Scotland. Venues for this event included Edinburgh, Birmingham and Manchester with Birmingham winning the plate on one occasion.

The 1990s

Until 1994 the games were usually against local sides with occasional Medical School opposition. However, in 1994 the Medical Schools cup was introduced. Birmingham won this in its inaugural year beating St Georges, London, in the final 14-13. Unfortunately they were unable to defend their title in 1995 losing to the eventual winners Cardiff in the semi-final.

The 2000s

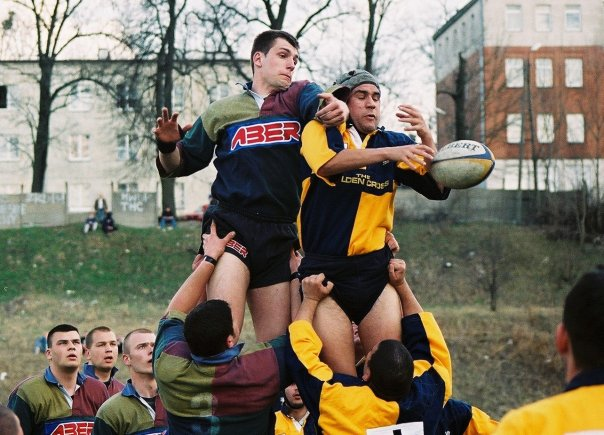
Aber Olsztyn vs. UBMSRFC on tour in Poland 2003

Tours during the 2000s were as varied as previous decades from Norwich to Poland and Blackpool to Cork. The tour to Poland (2003/4) was a particular highlight, although the rugby was not so successful when Birmingham lost to Aber Olsztyn 97-7. However the opposition were a Polish premiership side at the time and Birmingham were the first English touring side to score a try against them, courtesy of Adie Morrison.

The 2010s

In the 2012/13 season the 1st XV was captained by Will Belvins with Lloyd Collier as Chairman. This year saw the revival of the game against the University 1st XV on the final day of the Christmas term, under floodlights on the Bournbrook. In what was one of the most impressive performances seen by any Club side over recent time, the 1st XV ran out 15-11 winners in what was an incredible performance in front of over 1000. Unfortunately, after an impressive start in NAMS, we eventually lost out to Cardiff Medics in the semi-final.

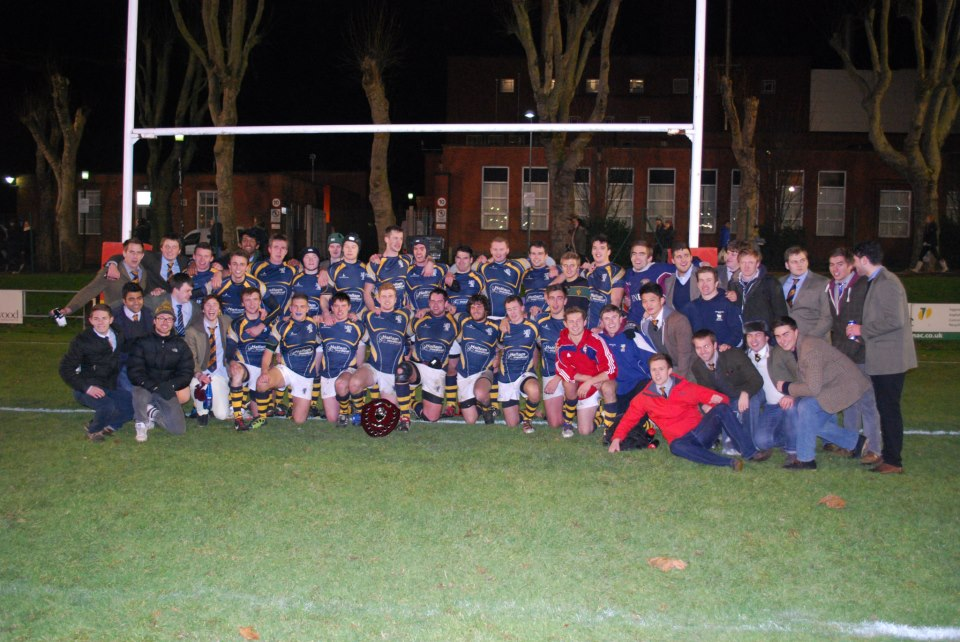
Varsity Champions 2012/13

Brum Varsity 2012/13

14 December 2012
18:30 GMT (UTC+00)

UBRFC	11-15	UBMSRFC
Try: Unknown; Con: Unknown (0/1); Pen: Unknown (2/2)		Try: Blevins, Matthews; Con: Collier (1/2); Pen: Collier (1/1)

Bournbrook, Birmingham
Attendance: 1,000

UBRFC	UBMSRFC

The 2013/14 season saw massive change for the Club, with the entry into the West Midlands Reserve League Division 1, and also with a move to the Rowheath Pavilion in Bournville, due to increasing frustrations with the University's pitches. The 1st XV was once again led superbly by William Blevins. The first half of term saw the Club go 9 from 9, as well as going on the first tour in 4 years in an interesting Club tour to Newcastle. In a packed schedule after Christmas, the Club continued to dominate local sides but once again found themselves losing out at the semi-final stage in NAMS – this time to Sheffield.

Two more seasons followed, with the Club losing to Manchester Medics and then once again Old Foes Cardiff in successive NAMS semi-finals. It was decided to withdraw from the West Midlands Reserve League to concentrate on playing against Medical School sides. The numbers took an initial dip in 2013/14, with the failure to even field a 2nd XV (Arirsharks) side. Under the leadership of Chaz Hudson as captain, and with Tom Stevens as chairman in 2015/16, the Club were once again able to snatch victory from the University 1st XV on the Bournbrook in front of a huge crowd – with a winning try from Tom Stevens at some incredible defence at the death securing the victory 17-15.

Brum Varsity 2015/16

11 December 2015
18:30 GMT (UTC+00)

UBRFC	15-17	UBMSRFC
Try: Galloway, Cranton, Earle; Con: Bonar (0/3)	Report	Try: Kennard, Stevens; Con: Bourke (2/2); Pen: Bourke (1/2)

Bournbrook, Birmingham
Attendance: 2,000

UBRFC	UBMSRFC

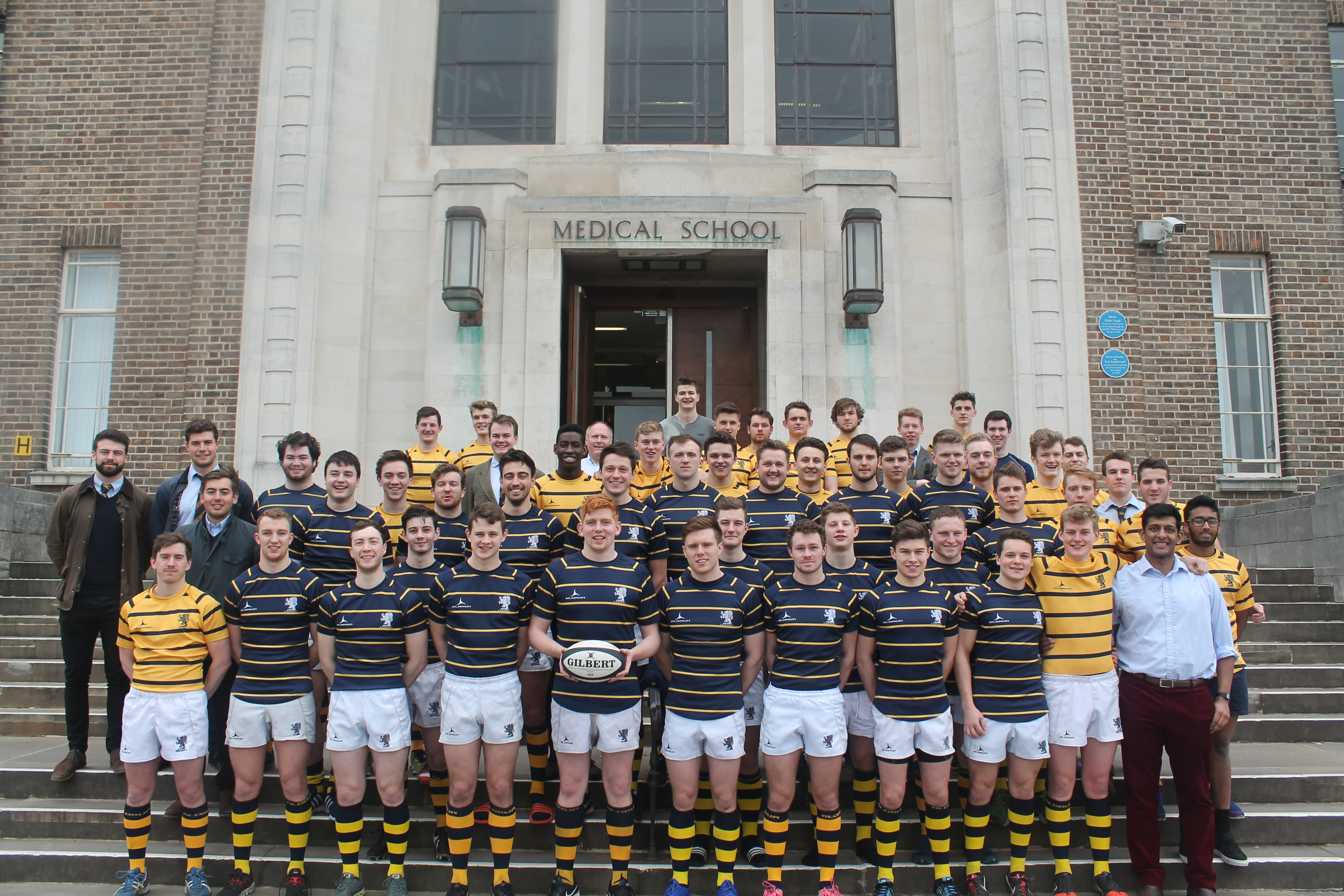
"Le Cloob" outside the Medical School, 2017

== Past Chairmen and Captains ==
Season	Chairman	1st XV Captain	2nd XV Captain
1958–59	Richard Donovan		
1959–61	Unknown		
1961–62	Arnold Gourevitch		
1962v63		Dick Herbert	
1963–64	Roger Lee		
1964–66	Unknown		
1966–67	Frank McGuinness/ Hugh Cameron	Pier Abson	
1967–68		Mac Rouse	
1968–80	Unknown		
1980–81		Dave Hahn	
1981–82		Dave Bush	
1982–83		Jim Goodman	
1983–84	Jim Goodman	Alyn Humphries	Dave Ekbery
1984–85		Simon Meech	
1985–86		Mark Hopkin	Nick Wood
1986-87	Simon Meech	Jeremy Bradley	
1987–88	Mark Hopkin	Rhodri Williams	
1988–89	Johnathan Broome	Martin Evans	
1989–90	Chris Davies	Dan Blackman	
1990–91	Iain Rock	Pete Leman	Rich Davies
1991–92	Duncan Sim	Jim Hall	
1992–93	Duncan Sim		
1993–94	Al Mountain	Adam Hughes	
1994–95	Mike Berry	Charlie Brown	Chris Harmison
1995–96	Charlie Brown	Johnathon Jones	Graham Ireland
1996–97	James Geogahan	Adam Jones	Dan Ashdown
1997–98	Scott Bird	Chris Gough	
1998–99	Nick Abott	Nick Bosnako	Ben Goodling
1999–00	Adam Brown	James Pittaway	Gary Lambert
2000–01	Nick Bosanko	Ben Gooding	David Raven
2001–02	Neil Sharma	Dylan Rees	Bishoy Yousef
2002–03	Nik Mann	Andrew Duggan	Jonathan Richardson
2003–04	Chris Thompson	Vinnie During	
2004–05	Andrew Duggan	Grant Syme	
2005–06	Simon Long	Nick Walder	
2006-07	Charles Daultrey	Guy Evans	Lyndon Wells
2007–08	Lyndon Wells	Mike Bateman	Chris McLenachan
2008–09	Tomi Moore	Gareth Snell	Paul Mawer
2009–10	Tomi Moore	John Waterfield	Patrick Smith
2010–11	Gareth Snell	Alex Small	Josh Whittaker
2011–12	Sebastian Molyneux	Lloyd Collier	James Leckenby
2012–13	Lloyd Collier	Will Belvins	Ananth Srinivasan
2013–14	Josh Whittaker	Will Blevins	Luke Mason
2014–15	Tom Wright	Tom Stevens	Richard Doxey
2015–16	Tom Stevens	Chaz Hudson	Dom Catlow
2016–17	Chaz Hudson	Steffan Griffin	Guy Foggit
2017–18	Ronan Yeo	Joe Hogan	Charlie Taylor
2018–19	Aidan Butler	Adam Mackie	Lewis Turner
2019–20	Matt Eskell	Tom Stubley	Jacek Parylo
2020-21	James Wooding	William Thompson	Matthew Gibson
2021-22	James Wooding	William Thompson	Matthew Gibson
2022-23	Sameer Foster	Oscar Notley	Thomas Appelboam
2023-24	Alex Browne	Joe Wheeler	Max Yip
2024-25	Toby Rock	Luke Scott	Charlie Price
2025/26	Tobias Sainty	Sam Bishop	William Galloway
2026/27	Benedict McGuinness	Josh Froom	Isaac Brownlee-Jones
