= William Sands Cox =

English surgeon

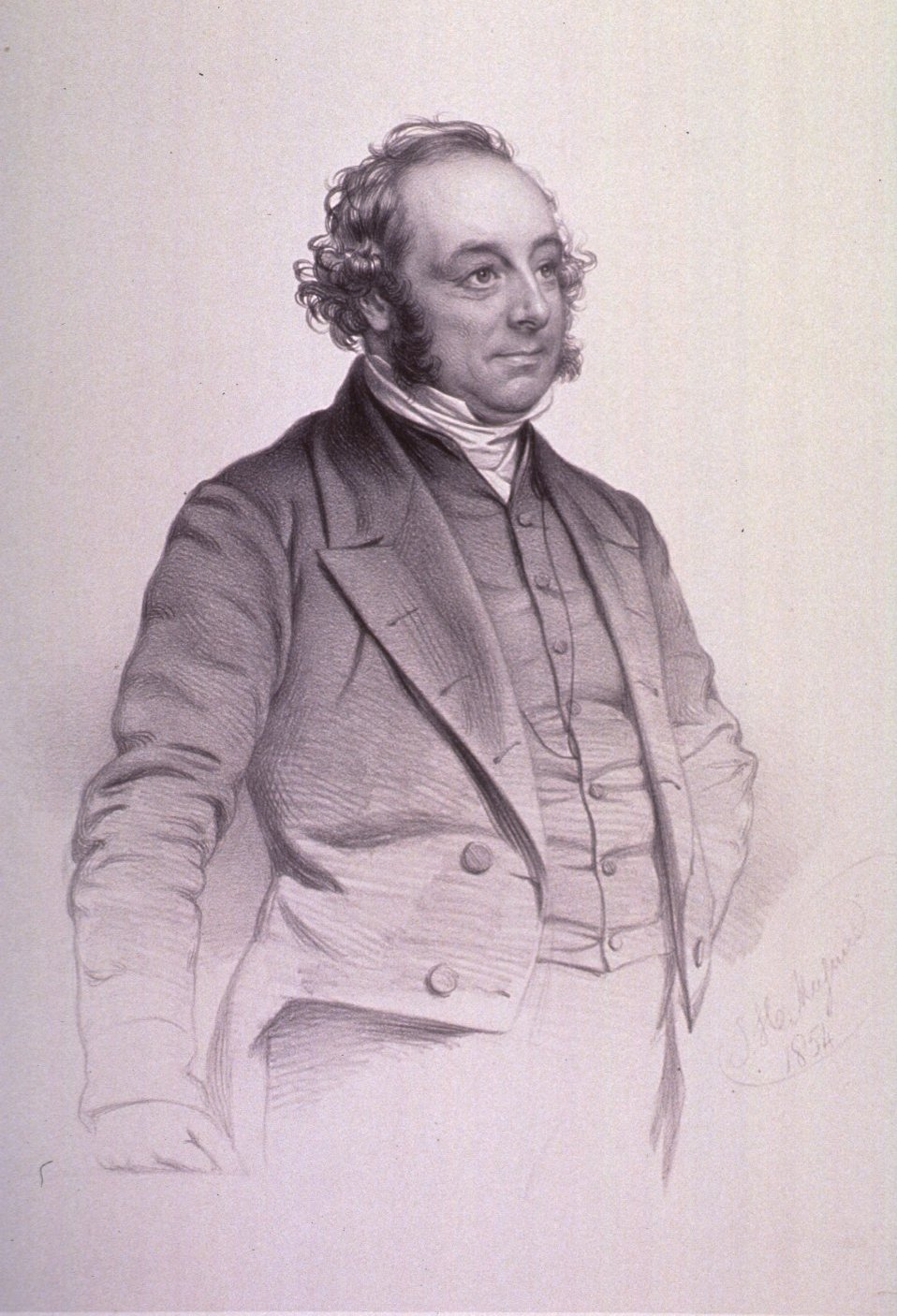
William Sands Cox, drawing by Thomas Herbert Maguire

William Sands Cox (1802 in Birmingham – 23 December 1875 in Kenilworth) was a surgeon in Birmingham, England.

== Founding of Birmingham's first medical school ==
He founded Birmingham's first medical school in 1825 as a residential Anglican-based college in Temple Row, where a blue plaque ]resource for his medical students.

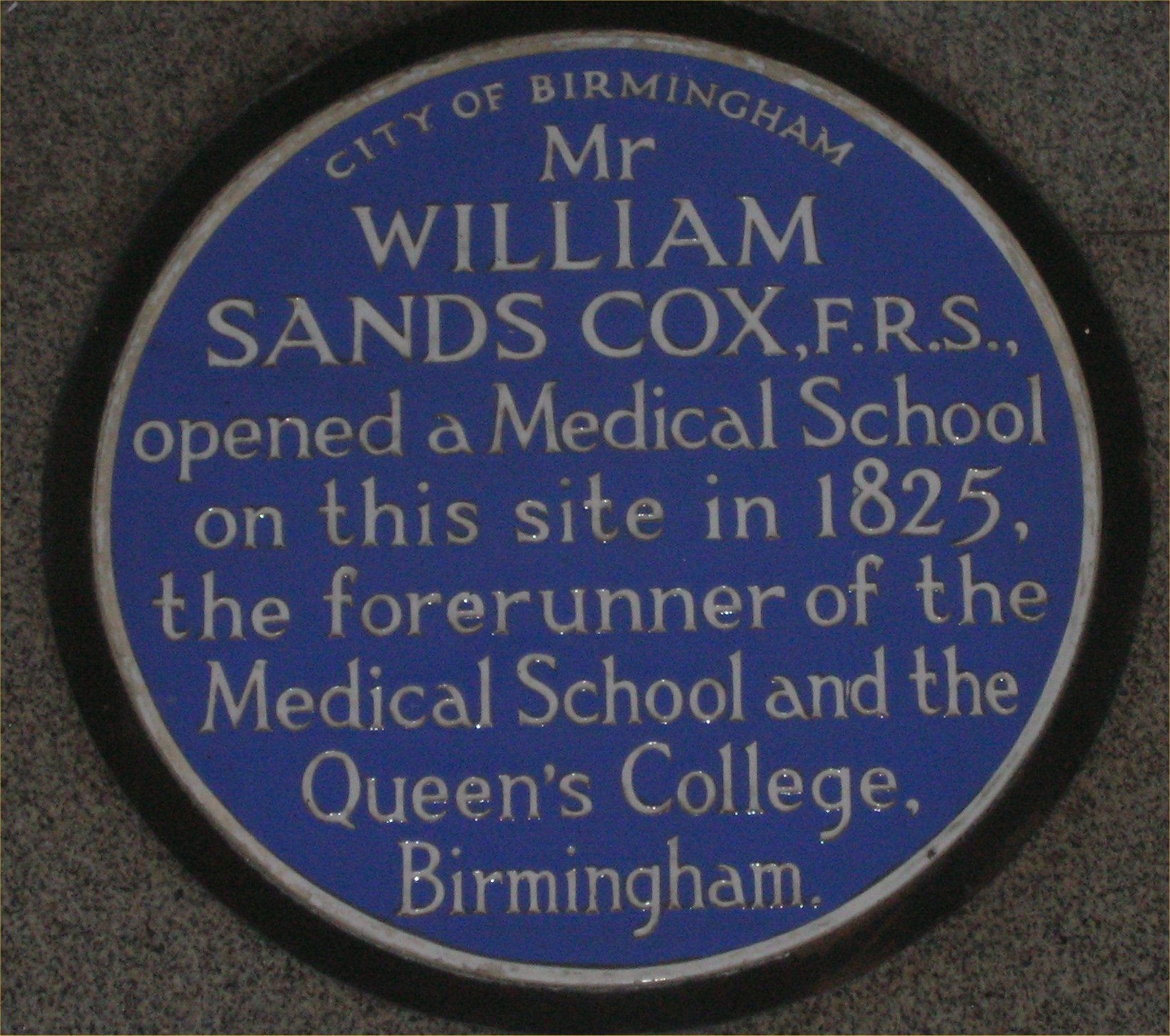
Blue plaque on House of Fraser in Temple Row

The Birmingham School of Medicine and Surgery became the Birmingham Royal School of Medicine and Surgery in 1836 and then the Queen's College in 1843 by Royal Charter. Cox's ambition was for the college to teach arts, law, engineering, architecture and general science as well as medicine, surgery and theology. However, after a major split in the organisation, the non-theological departments moved off into Mason Science College which later became the University of Birmingham leaving the name Queen's College as a theological institution.

=== Sands Cox Chair of Anatomy ===
The Sands Cox Chair of Anatomy is a named professorial chair at the University of Birmingham, established to honour William Sands Cox. Named chairs such as this are typically created by universities to commemorate historically significant individuals and to recognise academic leadership in a particular discipline. The Sands Cox Chair of Anatomy is currently held by Professor Tracey Wilkinson.

== Archive ==
An archive collection of Cox's papers is held at the Cadbury Research Library, University of Birmingham.

== See also ==
- Queen's College, Birmingham (historical)
- Queen's College, Edgbaston (current theological college)
- University of Birmingham Medical School
