= Jeannette Littlemore =

British linguist

Jeannette Littlemore is a British scholar of English and applied linguistics whose work focuses on the interpretation of figurative language, including metaphor and metonymy, as it relates to second language learning and teaching. Her research examines the ways that metaphor is misunderstood by learners of English.

== Education ==
Littlemore earned her PhD in English Language Teaching at Thames Valley University in 1998.

== Academic career ==
Littlemore has worked at the University of Birmingham since 1999, having taught and lectured earlier in Brussels, Belgium; Saitama Ken, Japan; and Santander, Spain. She served as the Head of Department of English Language and Applied Linguistics at the University of Birmingham, where she is currently a Professor. In addition, in 2016 she was appointed Distinguished Professor at the Research Institute for Bilingual Learning and Teaching (RIBiLT) at the Open University of Hong Kong, where her duties include mentoring academic staff in research and publications and supporting the research activities of academics.

She is a member of the international advisory board of Metaphor Lab Amsterdam.

In 2014 Littlemore, along with Dr Paula Perez-Sobrino and Dr David Houghton, was awarded a £138,981 Marie Skłodowska-Curie Fellowship for the project ‘Exploring Multimodal Metaphor and Metonymy in Advertising’ (EMMA). The project examines responses to video advertisements on participants who are speakers of English, Spanish, and Chinese.

== Key publications ==
=== Books ===
- 2015. Jeannette Littlemore. Metonymy: Hidden Shortcuts in Language, Thought and Communication. Cambridge Univ. Press.
- 2014. Jeannette Littlemore and John R. Taylor. The Bloomsbury Companion to Cognitive Linguistics. Bloomsbury.
- 2013. Alice Deignan, Jeannette Littlemore and Elena Semino. Figurative Language, Genre and Register. Cambridge Univ. Press.
- 2011. Nicholas Groom and Jeannette Littlemore. Doing Applied Linguistics: A guide for students. Routledge.
- 2010. Jeannette Littlemore and Constanze Juchem-Grundmann, eds. Applied Cognitive Linguistics in Second Language Learning and Teaching. (AILA Review, Vol. 23.) John Benjamins.
- 2009. Jeannette Littlemore. Applying Cognitive Linguistics to Second Language Learning and Teaching. Palgrave Macmillan.
- 2006. Jeannette Littlemore and Graham Low. Figurative Thinking and Foreign Language Learning. Palgrave Macmillan.

=== Journal articles ===
- 2011. Jeannette Littlemore, Phyllis Trautman Chen, Almut Koester and John Barnden. Difficulties in metaphor comprehension faced by international students whose first language is not English. Applied Linguistics. 32(4): 408-429.
- 2006. Jeannette Littlemore and Graham Low. "Metaphoric competence, second language learning, and communicative language ability," Applied Linguistics.
- 2003. Jeannette Littlemore. "The communicative effectiveness of different types of communication strategy," System.
- 2001. Jeannette Littlemore. "The use of metaphor in university lectures and the problems that it causes for overseas students," Teaching in Higher Education.
- 2000. Frank Boers and Jeannette Littlemore. "Cognitive style variables in participants' explanations of conceptual metaphors," Metaphor and Symbol.
