= Colin Thain =

English political scientist

- Born: 20 January 1959 (age 67); Bedlington, Northumberland, England
- Education: University of Manchester
- Known for: work on the HM Treasury, The Treasury and Whitehall: The Planning and Control of Public Spending (with Maurice Wright)
- Scientific career
- Fields: Political science, Political economy
- Workplaces: University of Exeter, University of Ulster, University of Manchester
- Doctoral advisor: Maurice Wright and Andrew Gamble

Colin Thain (born 20 January 1959) is professor of political science and a former head of the Department of Political Science and International Studies at the University of Birmingham. Born in Bedlington, Northumberland, Thain received a BA in economics (1981) and Ph.D. in government (1985) from the University of Manchester. He was previously based at the University of Ulster. Thain is currently also a visiting fellow at All Souls College and senior visiting research fellow in the Department of Politics and International Relations at the University of Oxford. In 1988, while he was a lecturer at the University of Exeter, Thain was awarded one of the first three Lloyd's Tercentenary Foundation Fellowships.

His research interests lie in the area of economic policy making, with a particular focus on HM Treasury and the Bank of England. His publications include an influential work in the study of the Treasury, The Treasury and Whitehall: The Planning and Control of Public Spending (co-authored with Maurice Wright, Clarendon Press, 1995), and he is currently working on a project on the evolution of the Treasury under the New Labour government, funded by the Economic and Social Research Council.
