= John Robert O'Connell =

Coat of arms of John Robert O'Connell

Notes
Confirmed 1 February 1917 by George James Burtchaell, Deputy Ulster King of Arms.
Crest
A stag's head erased Argent attired Or charged with a quatrefoil slipped Vert.
Torse
Of the colours.
Escutcheon
Per fess Argent and Vert a stag trippant Proper between three quatrefoils slipped counterchanged.
Motto
Ciall Atus Meart

Sir John Robert O'Connell MRIA, FSA (1868 – 28 December 1943) was an Irish solicitor, business man, and, after the death of his wife, a Roman Catholic priest.

O'Connell was born in 1868 the only son of Thomas Francis O'Connell, a solicitor of Dublin, Ireland. He is education was a Master of Arts and Doctor of Laws. He was admitted as a solicitor in Ireland in 1889, and became head of the firm of Thomas F. O'Connell & Son, Solicitors, Dublin;. He held a directorship of the National Bank of Ireland, Ltd.; solicitor to Dublin and South Eastern Railway Co.; was a member of governing body of University College Cork; Vice-president Statistical and Social Enquiry Society of Ireland; and member of Board of Superintendence of Dublin Hospitals.

He married Mary Scally, eldest daughter of Thomas Scally of Deepwell in 1901. He was created a Knight Bachelor in 1914, and was a justice of the peace for County Cork. Following the death of his wife in 1929 he was ordained a Roman Catholic priest in Westminster by Cardinal Bourne. He was attached for a time to Warwick-street Church and St. Patrick's Soho-square, London, and died at Brockenhurst, Hampshire, on 28 December 1943.
