= Kenneth Walton (geographer) =

Scottish geographer

Prof Kenneth Walton FRSE (1923 – 4 January 1979) was a 20th-century Scottish geographer. He was Vice Principal of the University of Aberdeen 1977 to 1979.

== Life ==
He was born in Cheshire in 1923. He was educated at King's School in Macclesfield.

In the Second World War he served with the Royal Artillery in India. He studied natural sciences at the University of Edinburgh graduating with an MA in 1948. He did postgraduate studies at Aberdeen University gaining a doctorate (PhD) in 1949.

He spent his whole career at the University of Aberdeen. In 1965 he became professor of geography at the University of Aberdeen.

In 1970 he was elected a Fellow of the Royal Society of Edinburgh. His proposers were Wreford Watson, Ronald Miller, John Cameron, Lord Cameron and John D. Matthews.

He died on 4 January 1979 aged 55.

== Publications ==
- The Highlands and Islands of Scotland (1961)

The Arid Zones University Tutorial Press (1966?)
