= Queen's College, Birmingham =

Former college in Birmingham, England

Coordinates: 52°28′44.41″N 1°54′13.84″W

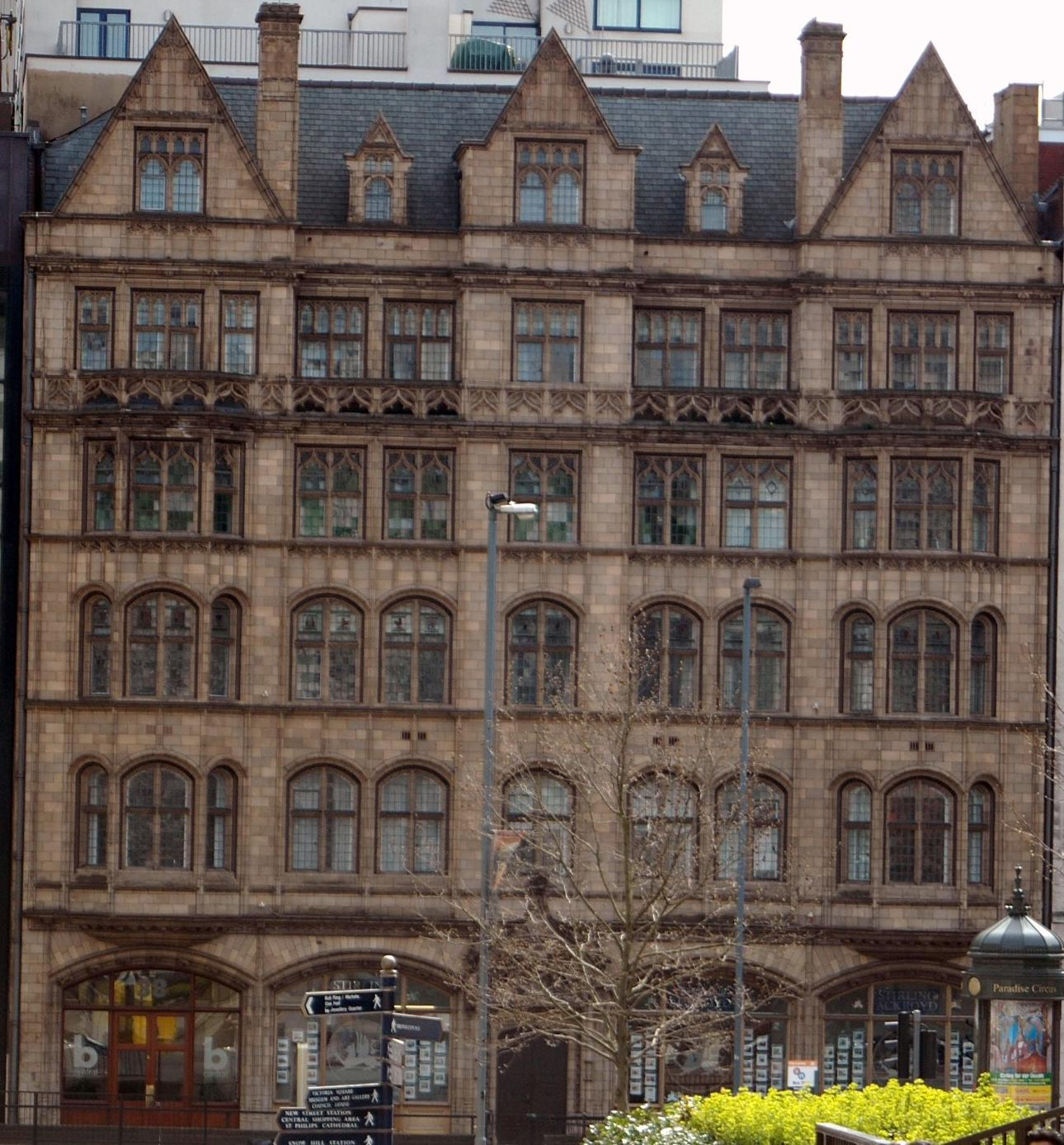
Queen's College on Paradise Street as viewed from Chamberlain Square.

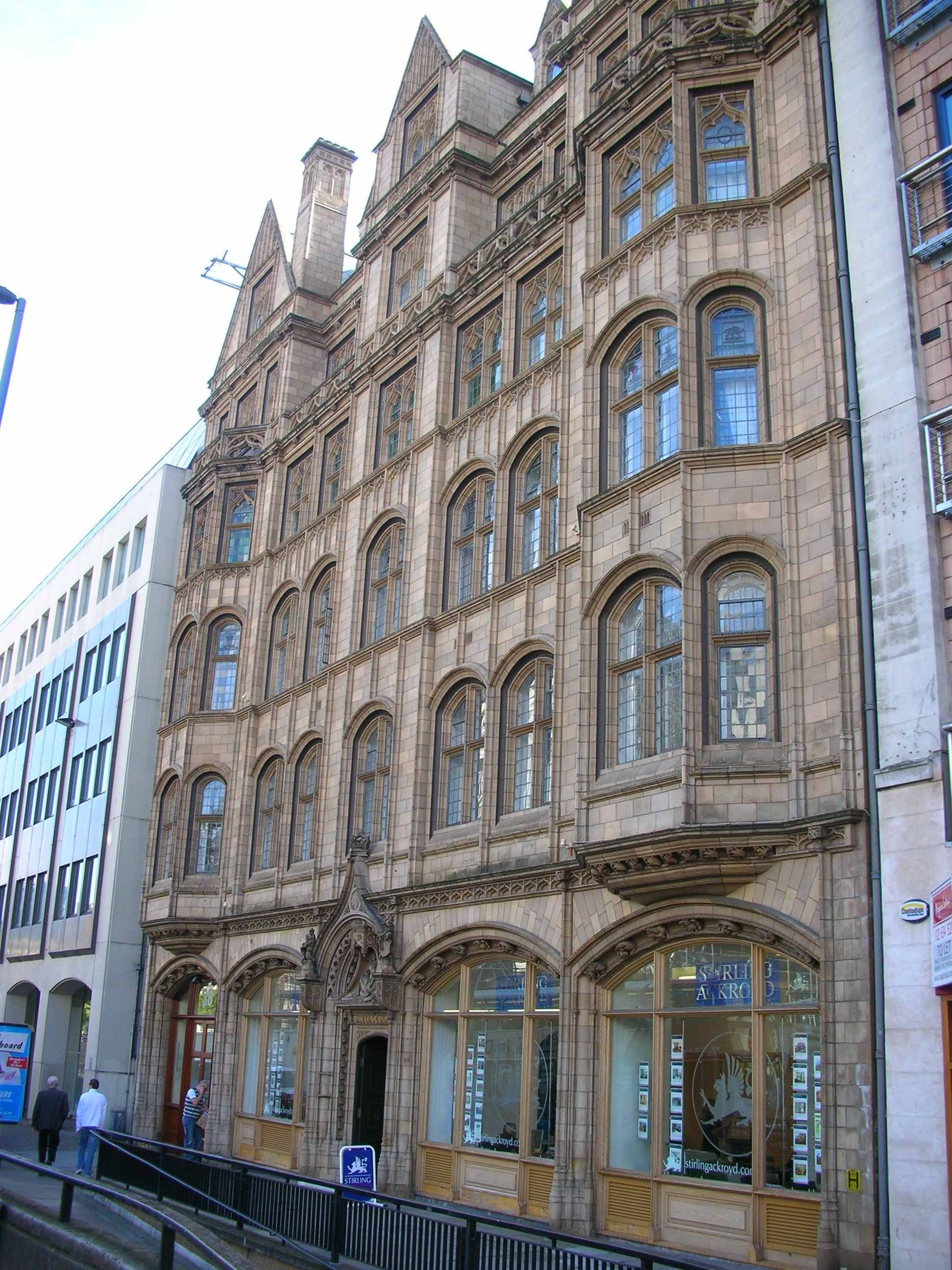
The grade II listed 1904 façade of Queen's College on Paradise Street

Queen's College was a medical school in central Birmingham, England, and a predecessor college of the University of Birmingham. It was founded by surgeon William Sands Cox in 1825 as The Birmingham Medical School, a residential college for medical students. Cox's ambition was for the college to teach arts, law, engineering, architecture and general science. It was the first Birmingham institution to award degrees, through the University of London.

Cox went on to found the Queen's Hospital in Bath Row (Drury & Bateman, opened 1841) as a practical resource for his medical students. The 1828 Medical School became the Birmingham Royal School of Medicine in 1836. It became the Queen's College in 1843 by royal charter.

== History ==
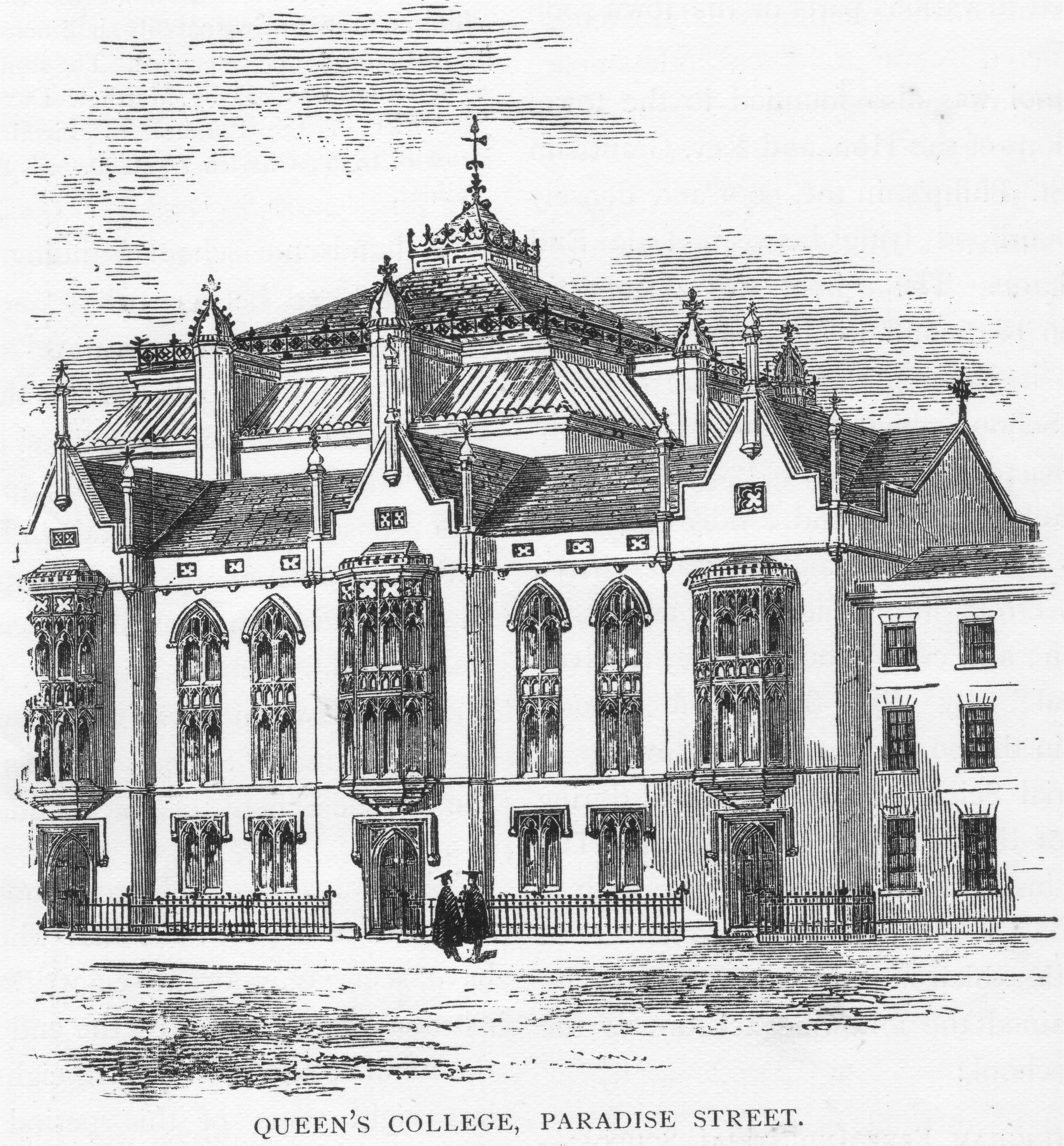
The original Queen's College in Paradise Street

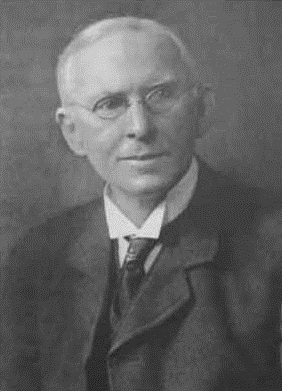
Sir Bertram Windle

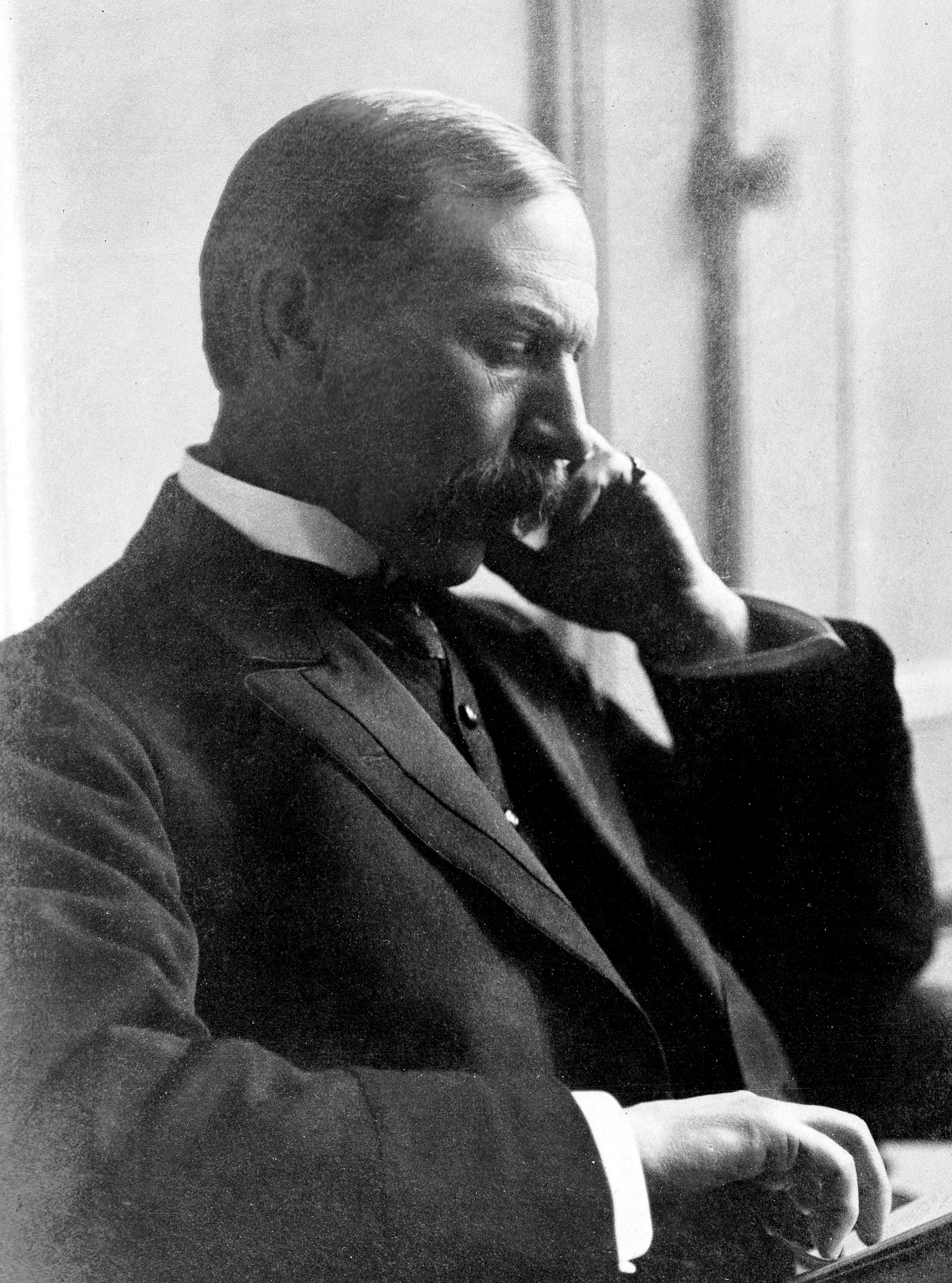
Sir Gilbert Barling

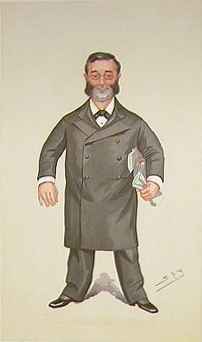
Lord Ilkeston

The college started life in Temple Row and Brittle Street (now obliterated by Snow Hill station). From the date of its Royal Charter in 1843 a large Gothic Revival building (Drury & Bateman, 1843–5) was constructed opposite the Town Hall between Paradise Street (the main entrance) and Swallow Street, where a chapel was built to St James. The building had large lecture theatre, laboratories, anatomical rooms, a dining hall and apartments for seventy students.

The development of the college owed much to the legacy of Samuel Wilson Warneford. The historian William Whyte says that Warneford – in life "a grasping, avaricious, bigoted reactionary" – and John Owens – "a parsimonious, work-obsessed, easily offended bachelor, who gave little to charity in his lifetime" and whose legacy was the basis for Owens College in Manchester – were "disagreeable men, with deep pockets and few friends". The two institutions were very different but in the characters of their benefactors lie fundamental similarities often found in history, that philanthropy is not necessarily selfless and that "the good are not always very nice". Warneford ensured that Queen's was an exclusively Anglican institution and as much as seminary as a medical school.

The building was given a new buff-coloured terracotta and brick front in 1904.

Following internal quarrelling and lawsuits the medical and scientific departments split from the college and moved to the nearby Mason Science College in Edmund Street. Mason Science College became the University of Birmingham in 1900 and developed a new campus in Edgbaston, although the Faculty of Arts remained at Edmund Street until the 1950s. The theological department of Queen's College did not merge with Mason College, and moved in 1923 to Somerset Road in Edgbaston, becoming the current Queen's Foundation, Birmingham.

In the mid 1970s, the original Queen's College building was demolished, with the exception of the grade II listed façade. The façade was incorporated into a new office and residential block named Queen's College Chambers, which was constructed in 1975–1976 by Watkins Gray Woodgate International.

== Academics and alumni ==
Notable academics and alumni of the college include:

- Sir Gilbert Barling, 1st Baronet, Dean of the Faculty of Medicine, Professor of Surgery and Pro-Chancellor at the University of Birmingham
- Walter Brooks, Professor of Music and organist
- William Sands Cox, founded Birmingham's first medical school
- Sir Guy Dain, Chairman of the British Medical Association 1943–1949 (M.B. medicine)
- Walter Foster, 1st Baron Ilkeston, physician and politician
- Charles Hardwick, historian and a priest of the Church of England who became the Archdeacon of Ely
- Charles Rann Kennedy, lawyer and classicist
- Sir William Moore, Surgeon-General and Honorary Physician to Queen Victoria
- Richard Hill Norris, Professor of Physiology at Queen's College, described the function of platelets in the blood and invented the first successful dry photographic plate
- George Vale Owen, one of the best-known spiritualists of the early twentieth century
- Samuel William Langston Parker, surgeon
- Hugh Pope, Dominican biblical scholar
- John Postgate, surgeon and academic, a campaigner against food adulteration
- Edward Smith, physician and medical writer
- Augustus Volney Waller, neurophysiologist
- Sir Bertram Windle, Dean of the Medical Faculty and Professor of Anatomy at the University of Birmingham, President of Queen's College, Cork
