= Kenneth Walton (pathologist) =

Kenneth Walter William Henry Walton
- Born: 6 September 1919
- Died: 26 April 2008 (aged 88)
- Education: University College London
- Known for: Research into the causes of heart disease
- Scientific career
- Fields: pathology, rheumatology
- Workplaces: King's College, Newcastle; University College Hospital; University of Birmingham

Major Kenneth Walter William Henry Walton FRCP (6 September 1919 – 26 April 2008) was a leading British experimental pathologist and rheumatologist. He published over 160 papers during his lifetime and was a member of 18 learned societies. One of the pathologists who helped form the current scientific era within his field, his death was described as 'the end of an earlier period of British rheumatology', and papers of his from the 1960s continue to be academically cited.

He was born in Lahore and attended school in Highgate, being accepted into University College London to study medicine, which he followed up with time spent at University College Hospital under Roy Cameron. During World War II he initially tended to victims of The Blitz before being called up in 1943, he was commissioned as a lieutenant in the Royal Army Medical Corps on 21 November. He spent time as a medical officer with infantry units stationed in England before being transferred to the East Asian theatre, serving as assistant director of pathology in Hong Kong. He was demobilised in 1947 and returned to UCH, but quickly transferred to University of Birmingham in England. He went to the United States in 1952 as part of a Rockefeller Fellowship, returning to the UK the next year. He was appointed a reader of the Experimental Pathology Department at Birmingham University in 1954 and became a professor in 1960.

He worked at Birmingham University for over 25 years, establishing the Rheumatism Research Wing and continuing research on heart disease. He is most well known for his 1973 study into the causes of heart disease in which participants were asked to eat greasy fry-ups. In the 1980s more academics joined his unit, allowing him to spend more time working on research; from 1981 to 1984 he published 35 papers. He retired in 1984 and suffered a brainstem stroke in 1987. He recovered, continuing research for a few more years, and died on 26 April 2008.

== Personal life ==
He married his wife Cynthia in 1948; they had four children, three daughters and a son. The son, Peter, also became a doctor.
