= Robert Lewins =

Robert Lewins (28 August 1817 – 22 July 1895) was a British army surgeon and philosopher. He is best known for his collaboration with Constance Naden on their philosophical theory called hylo-idealism.

== Army career ==
Robert Lewins was a Surgeon Lieutenant Colonel who served with the 63rd Regiment in the Crimean War and the Indian Mutiny among other campaigns. According to his obituary in the British Medical Journal, Lewins was also 'in the expedition to the north of China in 1865 in charge of the hospital ship Mauritius, and was present at the capture of the Taku Forts, receiving the medal'.

== Philosophical career ==
Upon retiring to England in 1868, Lewins turned his attention to propounding his atheist philosophy. In 1877, he published Life and Mind; on the Basis of Materialism. This work was reviewed favourably in The Secular Review by G. W. Foote, who wrote that it was an 'excellent little essay" containing "valuable information on the pathology of religious excitement".

Initially called Hylo-Zoism, it became Hylo-Idealism upon collaboration with Constance Naden. Other adherents during the 1880s were Herbert Courtney, George M. McCrie, and ‘Julian’ (E. Cobham Brewer's pseudonym).

He published numerous pamphlets on the subject, as well as being a prolific correspondent in certain quarters of the periodical press - including Knowledge, Journal of Science, Secular Review - during the latter decades of his life. The clearest articulation of his ideas (which were often expressed using jargon and obscure phrases) can be found in Humanism versus Theism; or Solipsism (Egoism) = Atheism. In a series of letters by Robert Lewins M.D. (London: Freethought Publishing Company, 1887).

== Friendship with Constance Naden ==
From their first meeting 1876 until Naden's death in 1889, Lewins and Naden had a close intellectual friendship. In the early years Lewins encouraged Naden to study German and the natural sciences. The development of their intellectual relationship can be partially traced in the letters Lewins wrote to Naden between November 1878 and February 1880, which were edited and published in 1887, with a preface by Naden, as Humanism versus Theism. They went on to work together as peers on their atheist philosophy, Hylo-Idealism, which endeavoured to use scientific knowledge to show that the universe is best explained through a synthesis of materialism and (non-spiritual) idealism.

Marion Thain has described how 'what appealed to Naden, came in key part from his poetic ability to elevate monistic theories of life through his rhetoric [... Naden] shares Lewins’ desire to imbue her monism with the same sense of wonder and power which people have traditionally found in religion.'

After Naden's death in December 1889, Lewins rapidly commissioned a memorial bust for Mason Science College, which is now housed in the University of Birmingham's Cadbury Research Library reading room. He also contributed to Constance Naden: A Memoir, a volume authored by four of her friends; Lewins' chapter focuses entirely upon explaining their shared philosophical ideals rather than recounting memories of Naden.
