= William Tilden =

William Tilden may refer to:

- Sir William A. Tilden (1842–1926), British chemist
- Bill Tilden (1893–1953), American tennis player
