= Lawrence Crawford =

Lawrence Crawford may refer to:

- Lawrence Crawford (soldier)
- Lawrence Crawford (mathematician)
- Lawrence D. Crawford, American mayor of Saginaw, Michigan
