= T. W. Bridge =

British zoologist specializing in fish

Thomas William Bridge (5 November 1848 – 29/30 June 1909) was a British zoologist who studied fish, and was particularly known for his research on the swim bladder in Siluridae. After working in Cambridge (1869–79), he held professorships at the Royal College of Science for Ireland (1879–80) and Mason College/University of Birmingham (1880–1909). He was an elected fellow of the Royal Society (1903).

== Biography ==
Bridge was born on 5 November 1848 in Birmingham, to Lucy (née Crosbee) and Thomas Bridge, who made footwear. He attended Moseley School and then trained in science at the Birmingham and Midland Institute. He moved to Cambridge at the end of 1869, where he initially worked at the university's Zoology Museum directly for John Willis Clark, the museum's superintendent. (Note: He was initially paid privately by Clark, but this ceased on Clark's marriage.) In 1871, despite his lack of Cambridge degree, Bridge was appointed a university demonstrator in comparative anatomy (a teaching position), while continuing his work for Clark; the courses that Clark and Bridge organised were the first practical teaching of zoology at the university. Bridge read natural sciences (1871–75), with a scholarship at Trinity College, Cambridge. He remained in Cambridge as a demonstrator after gaining his degree, apart from a brief stint at the Zoological Station in Naples in 1876.

He was professor of zoology at the Royal College of Science for Ireland (1879–80) in Dublin. In 1880, he returned to Birmingham to become one of the first four professors of the newly founded Mason College (the others being William A. Tilden, Micaiah John Muller Hill and John Henry Poynting). Bridge held the chair in biology (1880–82) and was later the Mason Professor of Zoology and Comparative Anatomy (1882–1909), retaining the title when the college was subsumed into the University of Birmingham in 1900. He was active in the new institution's administration, for example, chairing the academic board.

He was awarded an Sc.D. by Cambridge (1896) and an M.Sc. by Birmingham (1901), and was elected a fellow of the Royal Society in 1903. He served as president of the Birmingham Natural History and Philosophical Society (1894).

Bridge never married, and died on 29 or 30 June 1909 at Selly Park, Birmingham.

== Research and writing ==
His research was on the comparative anatomy, morphology and osteology of vertebrates, predominantly fish. He was particularly known for his research on the swim bladder of Siluridae and its relationship with the auditory organ. With A. C. Haddon, he investigated a hundred species of Siluroid fish, and concluded that the air bladder was used to perceive changes in hydrostatic pressure rather than being involved in hearing, as had been proposed by Ernst Heinrich Weber (who had first described the interconnected structures in 1820).

Bridge also published on the osteology of ganoid fish and on vertebrate abdominal pores. He contributed a comprehensive article on the fishes to volume 7 of The Cambridge Natural History (1904), which Sidney Harmer describes in his Royal Society obituary as a "most valuable summary of a very difficult subject". Bridge also published on other vertebrates including the bandicoot.

== Selected publications ==
- T. W. Bridge (1896). The Mesial Fins of Ganoids and Teleosts. Zoological Journal of the Linnean Society 25 (165): 530–602 doi:10.1111/j.1096-3642.1896.tb00400.x
- T. W. Bridge, A. C. Haddon (1893). III. Contributions to the anatomy of fishes.—II. The air-bladder and weberian ossicles in the siluroid fishes. Philosophical Transactions of the Royal Society of London B: Biological Sciences 184: 65–333 doi:10.1098/rstb.1893.0003
- T. W. Bridge, A. C. Haddon (1889). Contributions to the Anatomy of Fishes. I. The Airbladder and Weberian Ossicles in the Siluridae. Proceedings of the Royal Society of London 46: 309–28 JSTOR 115062
- T. W. Bridge (1878). On the osteology of Polydon folium. Philosophical Transactions 169: 683–733 doi:10.1098/rstl.1878.0021
