= Wilmer Cave Wright =

British-born American classical philologist (1868-1951)

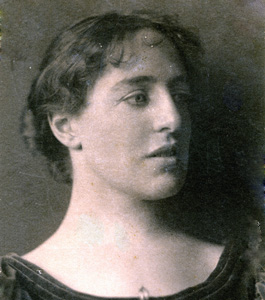
- Photo in A Woman of the Century
- Born: Emily Wilmer Cave France; January 21, 1868; Birmingham, England, U.K.
- Died: November 16, 1951 (aged 83); Bryn Mawr, Pennsylvania, U.S.
- Education: Girton College, Cambridge; University of Chicago
- Occupations: classical philologist; author
- Spouse: J. Edmund Wright (m. 1906) =
- Parents: William Haumer; F. E. Cave-Browne-Cave France
- Writing career
- Language: English
- Genre: non-fiction

Emily Wilmer Cave Wright (née, France; January 21, 1868 – November 16, 1951) was a British-born American classical philologist, and a contributor to the culture and history of medicine. She was a professor at Bryn Mawr College, where she taught Greek. Wright's works include, The Emperor Julian’s relation to the new sophistic and neo-Platonism (1896), A Short History of Greek Literature, from Homer to Julian (1907), Julian (1913–23), Philostratus and Eunapius: The Lives of the Sophists (1922), Against the Galilaeans (1923), Hieronymi Fracastorii de contagione et contagiosis morbis et eorum curatione libri III (1930), and De morbis artificum Bernardini Ramazini diatriba (1940). Giovanni Maria Lancisi: De aneurysmatibus, opus posthumum (1952), and Bernardino Ramazzini: De Morbis Typographorum (1989) were published postmortem.

== Early life and education ==
Emily Wilmer Cave France was born in Birmingham, England. Her parents were William Haumer and F. E. Cave-Browne-Cave France.

She studied from 1888 to 1892 at Girton College, Cambridge under an open scholarship, having first studied Latin and Greek at Birmingham's Mason College. From 1892 to 1893, she was Graduate in Honours, Cambridge Classical Tripos. She was a Fellow in Greek, Bryn Mawr College, 1892–93; Fellow in Latin, University of Chicago, 1893–94, and Fellow in Greek, 1894–95. She earned her Ph.D. in 1895 at the University of Chicago with a comprehensive study of the Sophist and Neoplatonist influences in the literary work of Emperor Julian. She was also a Reader in Greek and Latin, University of Chicago, 1895–96.

== Career ==
From 1897, she taught at Bryn Mawr College, first as Reader in Classics, from 1898 as Associate Professor of Greek, later as Full Professor of Greek. In 1933, she retired.

Wright specialized in late antique literature. Her studies on Julian's writings (4th century AD) presupposed great literacy in the ancient literature of previous centuries. Her literary history (1907), which ranged from the Homeric epics to Emperor Julian, was valued in the academic world and highly praised (for example, by Gilbert Murray). Her translations of the sophists Eunapius of Sardis and Philostratos (1922) as well as the writings of Julian (1913-1923) belong to this context. Later, Wright was primarily concerned with the history of early modern medicine and edited annotated reissues of various historical treatises.

== Personal life ==
On September 6, 1906, she married J. Edmund Wright. She died November 16, 1951, in Bryn Mawr, Pennsylvania.

== Selected works ==
- The Emperor Julian’s relation to the new sophistic and neo-Platonism (London, 1896)
- A Short History of Greek Literature, from Homer to Julian (New York, 1907)
- Julian ("Loeb Classical Library", 3 volumes, Cambridge/London, 1913–1923)
- Philostratus and Eunapius: The Lives of the Sophists ("Loeb Classical Library", Cambridge/London, 1922)
- Against the Galilaeans (1923)
- Hieronymi Fracastorii de contagione et contagiosis morbis et eorum curatione libri III (New York, 1930)
- De morbis artificum Bernardini Ramazini diatriba (Chicago, 1940)

=== Postmortem ===
- Giovanni Maria Lancisi: De aneurysmatibus, opus posthumum (New York, 1952)
- Bernardino Ramazzini: De Morbis Typographorum (Birmingham, 1989)
