= Hütte =

German handbook of mechanical engineering

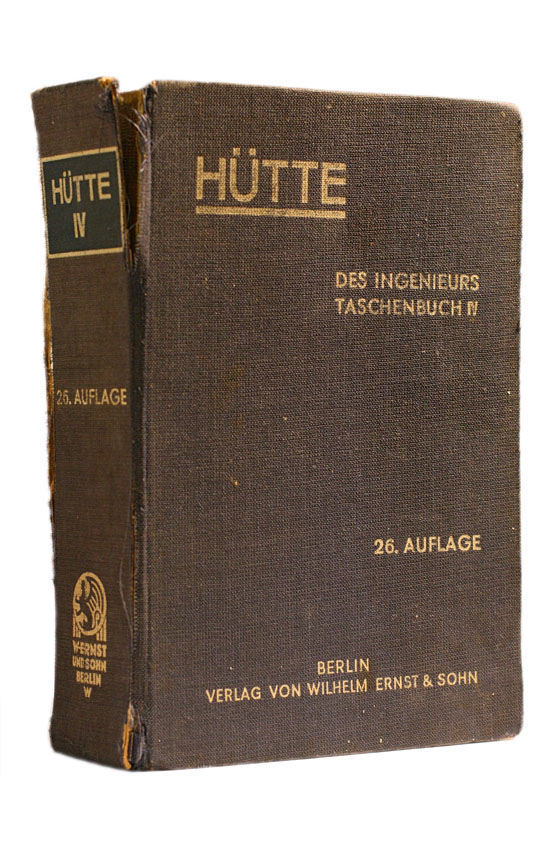
- Sample from 1938
- Language: German, Russian, English, French, Spanish, Hungarian, Turkish
- Publication date: 1857, 2012
- Publication place: Germany

The Hütte - Das Ingenieurwissen (originally Des Ingenieurs Taschenbuch, stylized as "HÜTTE" and pronounced IPA: [ˈhʏtə]) is a reference work for engineers of various disciplines. It was compiled for the first time in 1857 by the Akademischer Verein Hütte (short Die Hütte, translating as "the hut") of the Königliches Gewerbe-Institut in Berlin, from which the association of German engineers Verein Deutscher Ingenieure (VDI) emerged. The authors were members of the association. The technical illustrations were created in woodcut technique by Otto Ebel. It is published in constantly revised editions to this day and is therefore the oldest German reference work still available today.

== First edition 1857 and bibliophile reprint 2007 ==
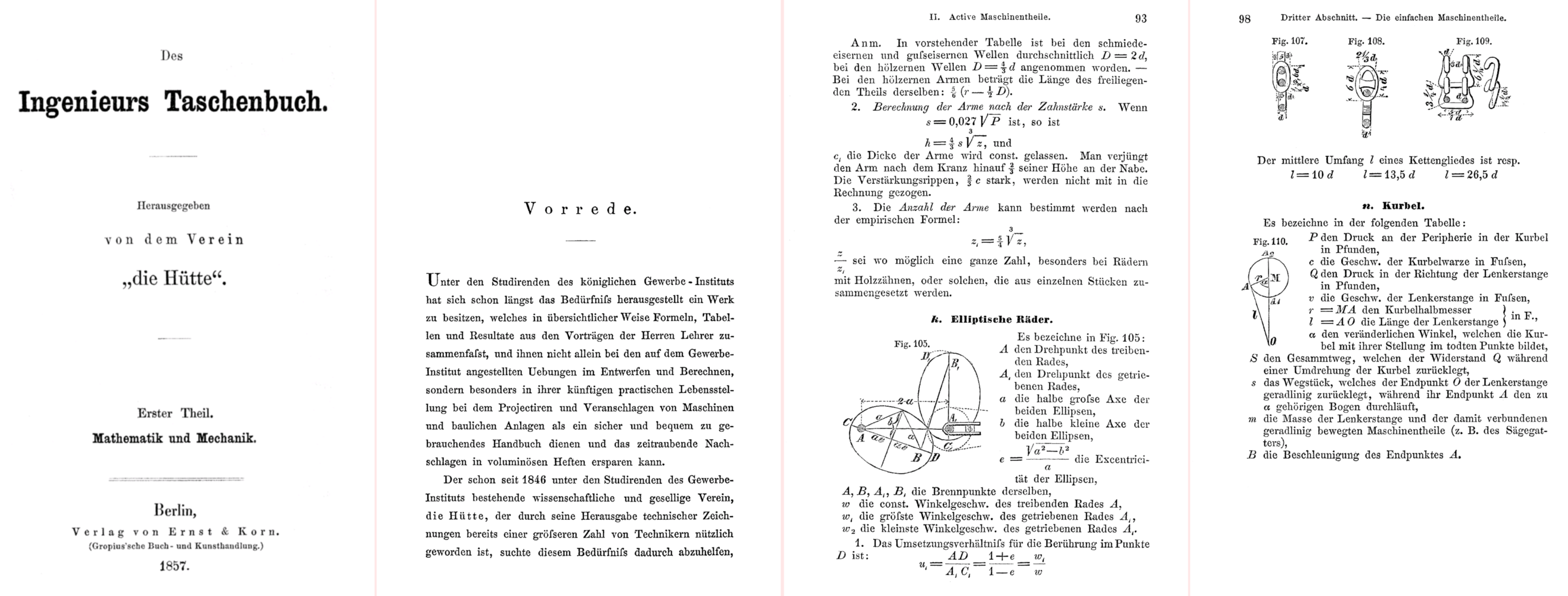
Four pages of the first edition (Reprint 2007)

The book was initially divided into three sections: Mathematik und Mechanik (Mathematics and Mechanics), Maschinenbau und Technologie (Mechanical Engineering and Technology) and Bauwissenschaft (Building Science) and was originally published by the publishing house Ernst & Korn (Gropius'sche Buch- und Kunsthandlung), Berlin, (Note: The Gropius'sche Buchhandlung in Berlin was founded in 1827 by the brothers Carl (1793–1870), Ferdinand (1798–1849) and Friedrich George Gropius (1802–1842) of the Gropius family. Their father Wilhelm Ernst Gropius (1765–1852) was a friend of Karl Friedrich Schinkel. Ernst & Korn was founded in 1851 by Friedrich Wilhelm Ernst (1814–1894), who had taken over the Gropius'sche Buchhandlung in 1850, and Heinrich Korn (1829–1907). In 1891, the publisher was renamed into Wilhelm Ernst und Sohn, later shortened to Ernst & Sohn.) the later Ernst & Sohn, who published it until 1971.

For the 150th anniversary in 2007, the first edition was reissued as a bibliophile reprint.

== Historical development ==
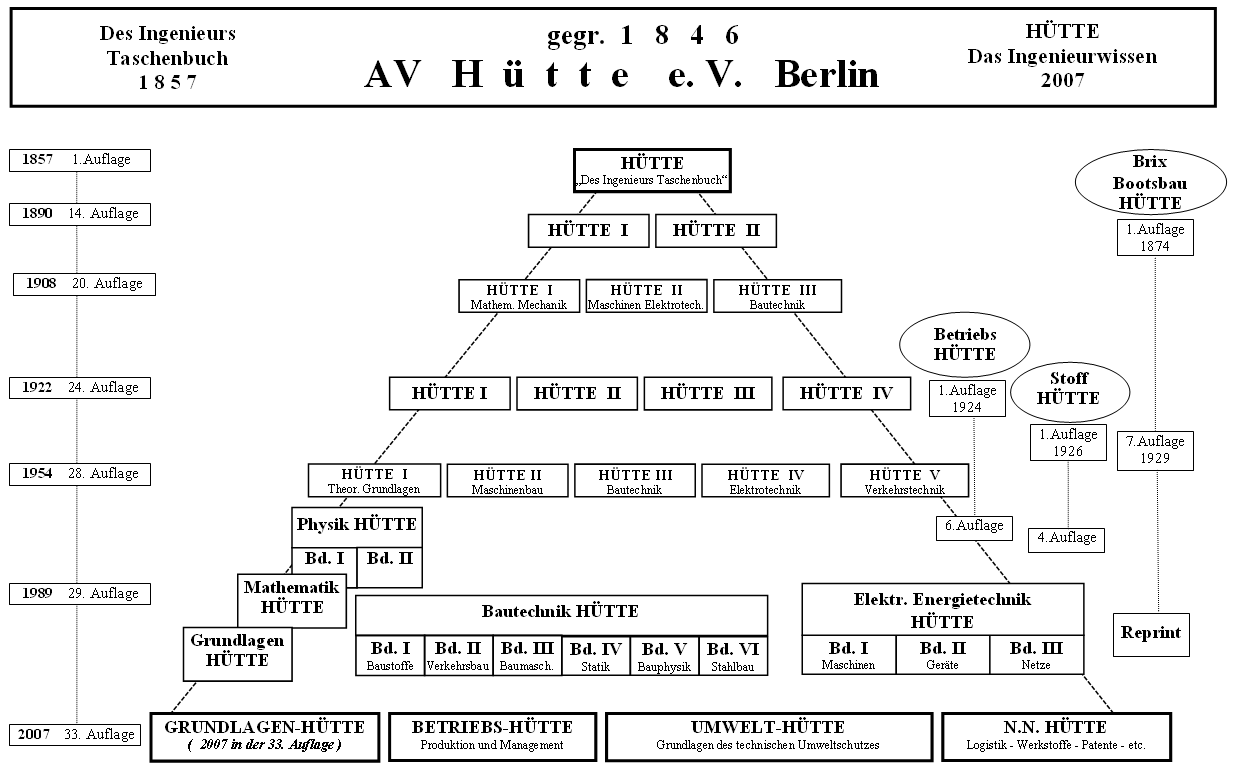
Family tree

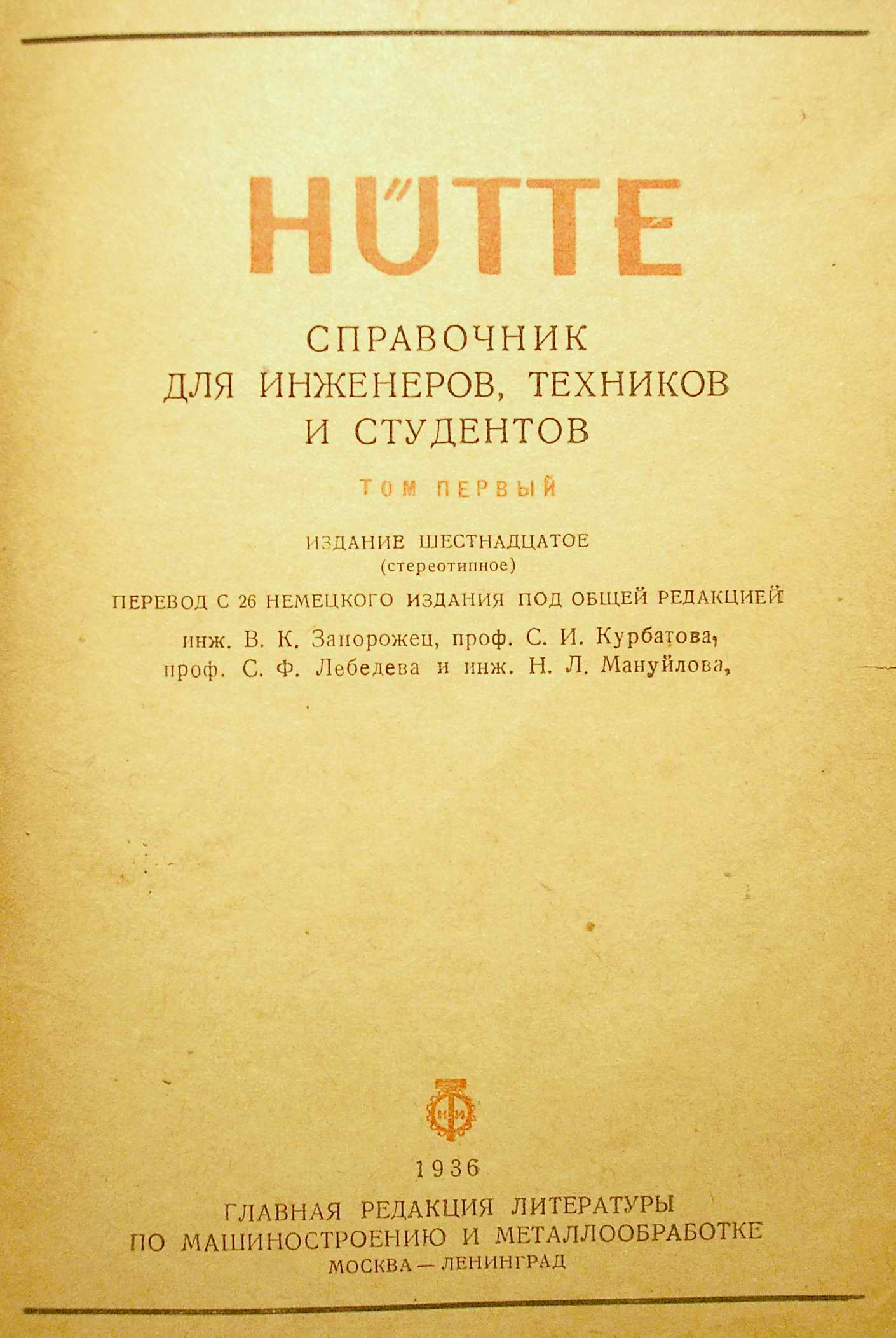
First volume of the 16th Russian edition of "Engineer's Manual" of the Hütte Academy in Berlin, published in 1936

Starting with the first edition in 1857, further book series have been developed over the decades. The reference work quickly developed into a standard work for engineers and was frequently reprinted and translated into other languages due to the great demand. The first translation ever was into Russian in 1863. In 1890, the work was divided into two, in 1908 into three, and finally in 1922 into four volumes. With the 27th edition in 1949, volume four was no longer available.

An English version was published by McGraw-Hill Book Co., New York, in 1916 as "Mechanical engineers' handbook, based on the Hütte and prepared by a staff of specialists" edited by Lionel Simeon Marks. This led to Marks' Standard Handbook for Mechanical Engineers, a work, which spawned several translations on its own and is continued up to the present with its 100th anniversary 12th edition published in 2017.

Another work initially influenced by the 1936 Russian translation of the 1931 edition of Hütte is the so-called Bronshtein and Semendyayev (BS) handbook of mathematics. Written in 1939/1940 in Russia, it was first published in 1945. Translated into German in 1958, the latter is maintained and, in turn, translated into many other languages up to the present (2020).

== Recent history ==
In the first years after the Second World War the work was temporarily relocated both to the Federal Republic of Germany (FRG) and German Democratic Republic (GDR).

The scientific Springer-Verlag has been publishing the book since 16 June 1971 and has been the publisher of all Hütte handbooks so far. For some time, the series was called "Hütte – Taschenbücher der Technik" (Technical Pocket Books). From the completely revised 29th edition in 1989 (volume editor Horst Czichos), the work once again appeared in one volume under the title "Hütte - Die Grundlagen der Ingenieurwissenschaften" (The Basics of Engineering). With the 32nd edition, it was renamed to the current title "Hütte - Das Ingenieurwissen" (Engineering Knowledge).

For the 150th anniversary in 2007, the 33rd edition of the book was published. It was updated to reflect the current state of science and technology and meet the curricula of technical universities and technical colleges. It comprises the following sections:

- Mathematical and scientific basics

A. Math and statistics
B. Physics
C. Chemistry

- Technological basics

D. Materials
E. Engineering mechanics
F. Technical thermodynamics
G. Electrical engineering
H. Measurement technology
I. Regulation and control technology
J. Computer engineering

- Basics for products and services

K. Development and construction
L. Production

- Economic and legal basics

M. Business administration
N. Management
O. Standardization
P. Legal
Q. Patents

The 34th edition was published in 2012, and the 35th edition was planned for 2020 and is now scheduled to be released in 2023.

== See also ==
- Bronshtein and Semendyayev (BS)
- Marks' Standard Handbook for Mechanical Engineers
