= Lionel Simeon Marks =

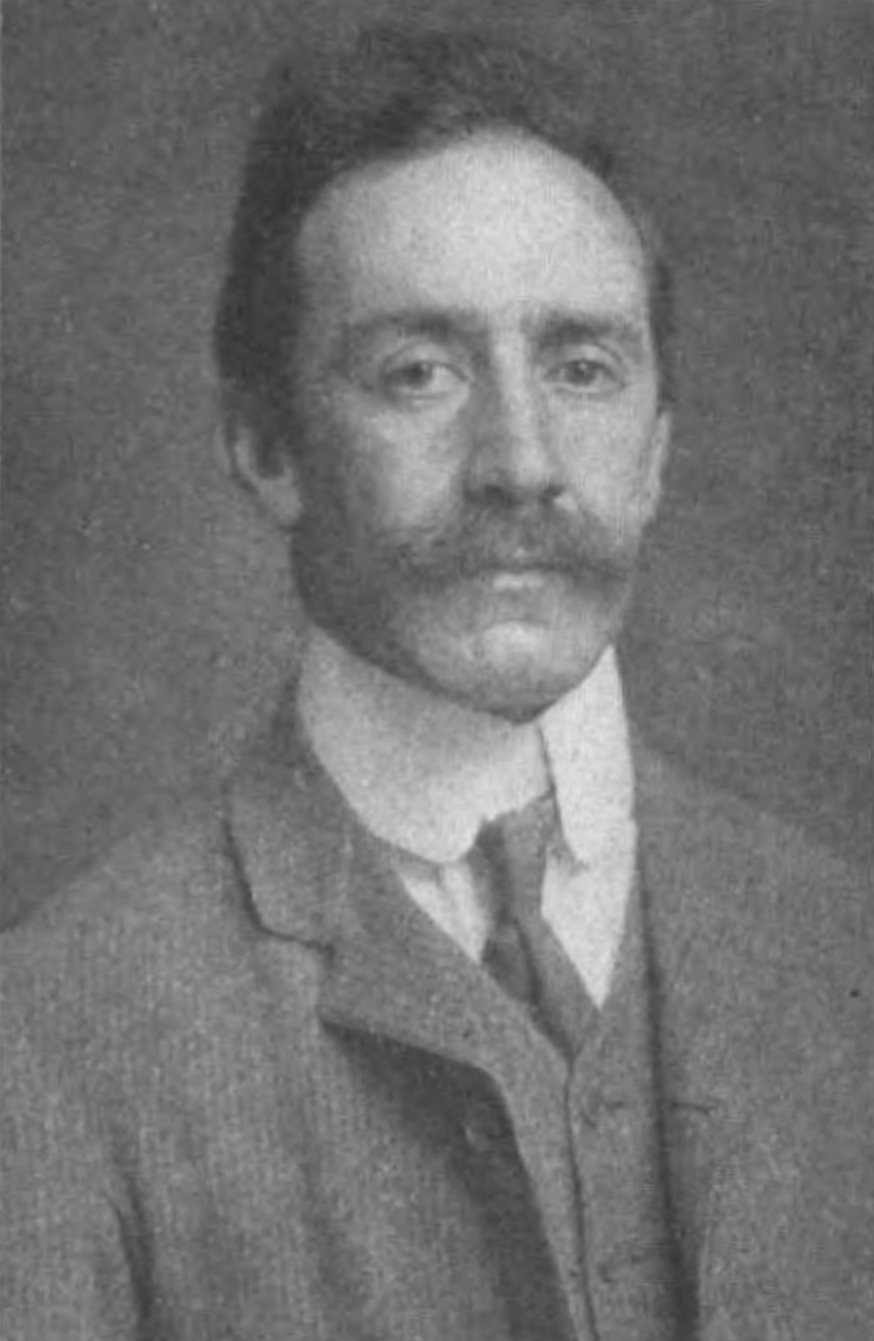
- Born: 8 September 1871; Birmingham, England
- Died: 6 January 1955 (aged 83); Providence, Rhode Island, United States
- Education: Mason Science College, B.S. (1892); Cornell University
- Occupation: Engineer
- Known for: Marks' Standard Handbook for Mechanical Engineers
- Spouse: Josephine Preston Peabody
- Scientific career
- Workplaces: Harvard University; Massachusetts Institute of Technology

Signature
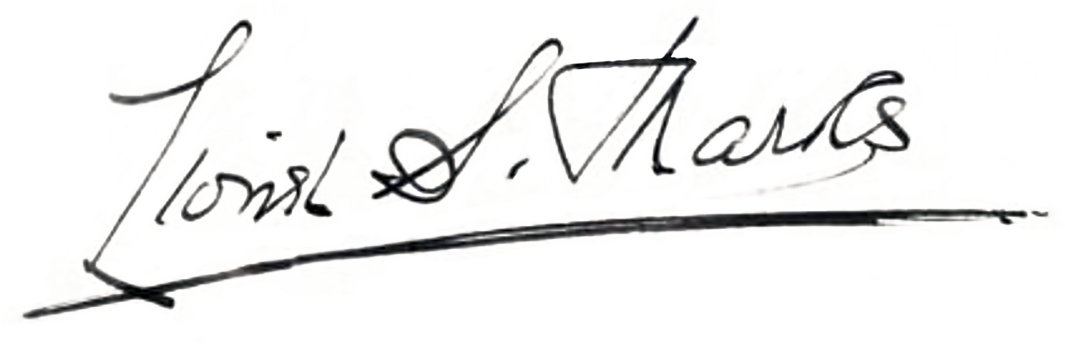

Lionel Simeon Marks (8 September 1871 – 6 January 1955) was a British engineer and one of the pioneers of aeronautics. He was born and mostly educated in England, but in 1892 moved to the United States. During World War II he was a chief consulting engineer to the US Bureau of Aircraft Production. His Marks' Standard Handbook for Mechanical Engineers is considered as classical reference work.

== Biography ==
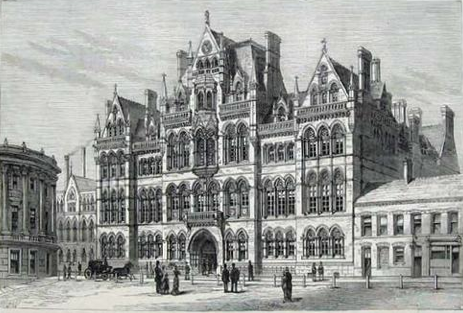
Mason Science College, now the University of Birmingham

Marks was born in Birmingham, England, where he graduated from Mason Science College (which later became the University of Birmingham) in 1892 with a bachelor of science degree. He received a fellowship to study at the Cornell University, New York, United States. In 1894, he became professor of mechanical engineering at Harvard University and retired in 1940. In the early 1900s he was also professor at the Massachusetts Institute of Technology.

On 21 June 1906 he married Josephine Preston Peabody, an American poet and dramatist. They had a daughter, Alison Peabody Marks (30 July 1908 – 7 April 2008), and a son, Lionel Peabody Marks (10 February 1910 – 25 January 1984).

Marks died of a heart attack in Providence, Rhode Island, aged 83.

== Publications ==
His most famous work is Marks' Standard Handbook for Mechanical Engineers, originally based on the German Hütte, was first published in 1916 as Mechanical Engineer's Handbook and contained 1836 pages. Its latest edition (11th, 2006) was compiled by 160 authors and comprised 1800 pages .

His other books include

- Lionel S. Marks; Harvey N. Davis (1910). Tables and Diagrams of the Thermal Properties of Saturated and Superheated Steam. Longmans, Green.
- Lionel Simeon Marks and Samuel S. Wyer (1913). Gas Engines and Producers: A Treatise on the Modern Development of the Internal-combustion Motor and of Efficient Methods of Fuel Economy and Power Production. American school of correspondence.
- Lionel Simeon Marks (2009). The Airplane Engine. BiblioBazaar. ISBN 978-1-110-31672-4.
