= Guy Dain =

British physician (1870–1966)

Sir Guy Dain
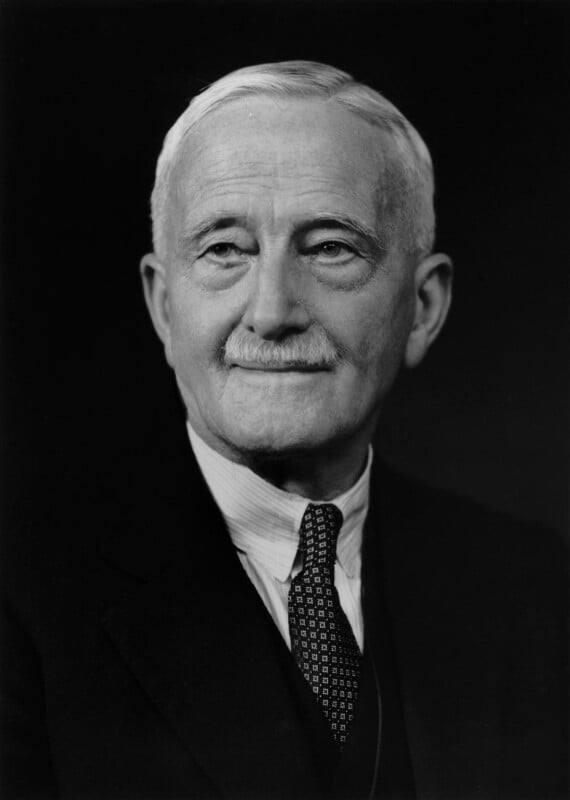
- Dain in 1949
- Born: Harry Guy Dain; 5 November 1870
- Died: 26 February 1966 (aged 95)
- Education: Mason College; University of London
- Occupation: Physician
- Known for: Chairman of the British Medical Association (1943 to 1949)

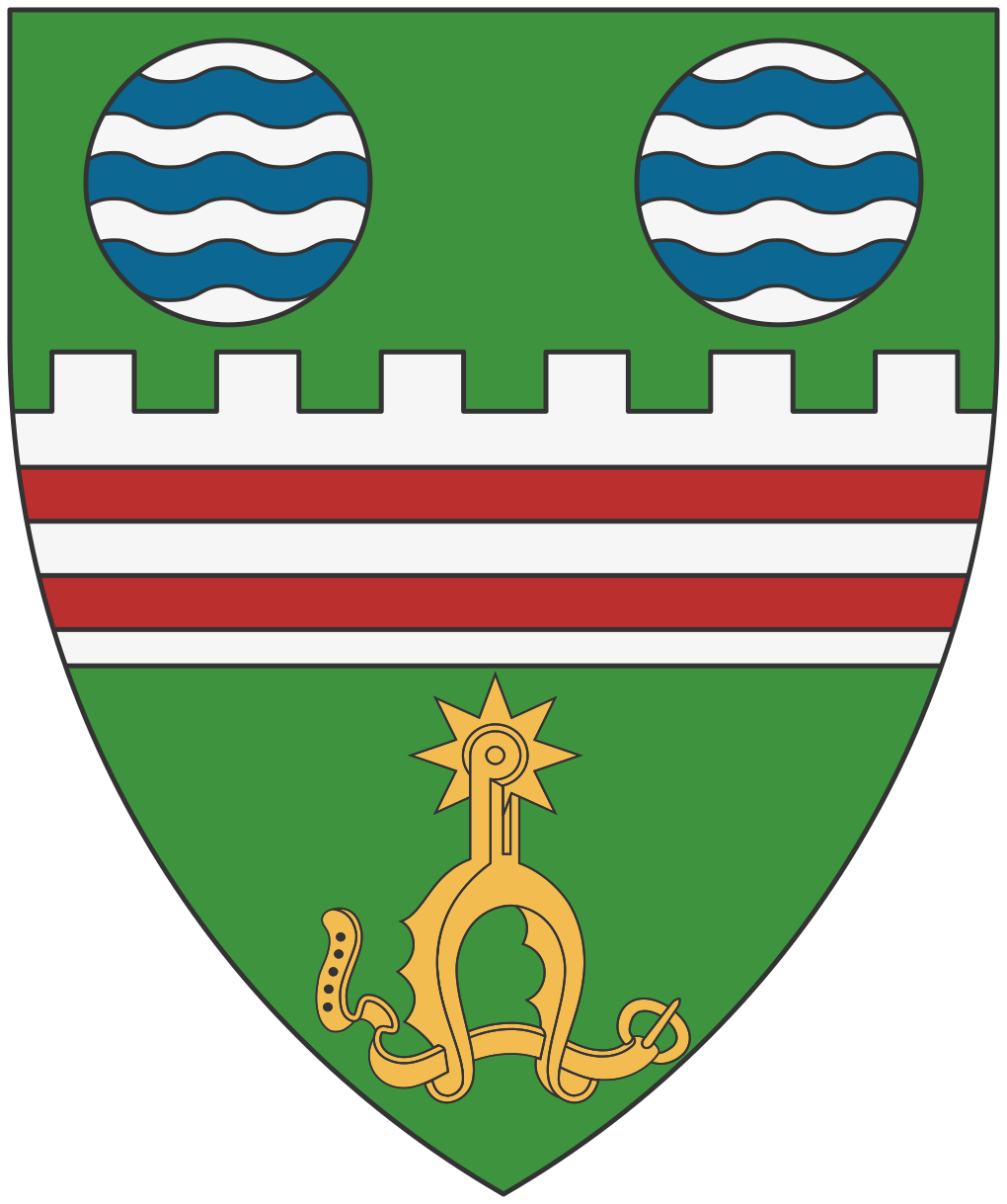
Dain's coat of arms

Sir Harry Guy Dain FRCS (5 November 1870 – 26 February 1966) was a British physician.

Between 1887 and 1894 Dain studied science and medicine at Mason College (a predecessor college of the University of Birmingham). He graduated with a University of London external MB degree in medicine in 1894.

Dain was Chairman of the British Medical Association from 1943 to 1949 at the time of the creation of the National Health Service. He strongly opposed the creation of the National Health Service and led British Medical Association opposition to it, publicly clashing with Aneurin Bevan, the then Minister of Health.

Dain was knighted in 1961. Dain was elected a Fellow of the Royal College of Surgeons in 1945. He received an honorary LLD degree from Aberdeen University in 1939 and an honorary MD degree from Birmingham University in 1944.
