= John Belling =

English cytogeneticist (1866–1933)

- John Belling in about 1933
- Born: 7 October 1866; Aldershot, Hampshire, England
- Died: 28 February 1933 (aged 66); Alameda, California
- Education: Stonehouse Grammar School, King's College London, University College London, Mason College
- Known for: The iron-acetocarmine staining technique for studying chromosomes
- Spouse: Hannah Sewall
- Scientific career
- Fields: Cytogenetics
- Workplaces: Cold Spring Harbor Laboratory, UC Berkeley

John Belling (7 October 1866–28 February 1933) was a cytogeneticist who developed the iron-acetocarmine staining technique which is used in the study of chromosomes.

== Early life and education ==
Born in Aldershot in England in 1866, the son of John Belling (1827–1884) and Lydia Ann née Tart (1842–1915), he studied at Stonehouse Grammar School, King's College London and University College London, and then entered Mason College (which later became the University of Birmingham) where he received his BSc in 1894. He married Hannah Sewall in June 1919 in Forest Glen, Maryland, USA and received an honorary DSc in 1922 from the University of Maine in recognition of his work.

== Career ==
In his work with Albert F. Blakeslee at Cold Spring Harbor on Datura (1920–1927) and at the University of California, Berkeley (1928–1933) Belling used plants such as lilies and hyacinths to demonstrate that segments between non-homogeneous chromosomes can interchange. He was able to make accurate estimates of chromosome numbers and proposed that chromomeres, the small condensations along the chromosome, were individual genes.

He identified that extreme temperatures for short durations of time can cause the formation of unreduced gametes.

== Death ==
Throughout his career Belling had many mental health problems that required frequent hospitalisation. He died suddenly on 28 February 1933 in Alameda in California, USA.

== Selected publications ==
- Belling, John (1912). Collected Reprints.
- Belling, John (1921). "On Counting Chromosomes in Pollen-Mother Cells". The American Naturalist. 55 (641): 573–574. doi:10.1086/279843.
- Belling, John (1921). "The Behavior of Homologous Chromosomes in a Triploid Canna". Proceedings of the National Academy of Sciences. 7 (7): 197–201. Bibcode:1921PNAS....7..197B. doi:10.1073/pnas.7.7.197. PMC 1084848. PMID 16586839. (See Canna.)
- Belling, John (1924). "The Distribution of Chromosomes in the Pollen-Grains of a Triploid Hyacinth". The American Naturalist. 58 (658): 440–446. doi:10.1086/279995.
- Belling, J. (1925). "The origin of chromosomal mutations in Uvularia". Journal of Genetics. 15 (3): 245–266. (See Uvularia.)
- Belling, J. (1926). "The Iron-Acetocarmine Method of Fixing and Staining Chromosomes". Biological Bulletin. 50 (2): 160–162. doi:10.2307/1536680. JSTOR 1536680.
- Belling, J. (1928). "The ultimate chromomeres of Lilium and Aloe with regard to the numbers of genes". University of California Publications in Botany. 14 (11). University of California Press: 307–318.
- Belling, J. (1928). "Contraction of chromosomes during maturation divisions in Lilium and other plants". University of California Publications in Botany. 14 (14). University of California Press: 335–343.
- Belling, J. (1930). The use of the microscope. Рипол Классик. ISBN 978-5-87122-495-3.
  - Belling, John (10 December 2018). The Use of the Microscope: A Handbook for Routine and Research Work (Classic Reprint). Forgotten Books Company, Limited. ISBN 978-0266559405.
- Belling, J. (1933). "Crossing over and Gene Rearrangement in Flowering Plants". Genetics. 18 (4): 388–413. doi:10.1093/genetics/18.4.388. PMC 1208410. PMID 17246698.
