= Kineton Parkes =

English novelist, art historian and librarian

William Kineton Parkes (1865–1938) was an English novelist, art historian and librarian, known best for his publication concerning sculpture and his 1914 modernist novel Hardware: A Novel in Four Books.

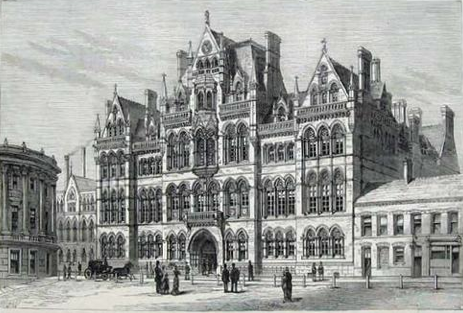
Mason Science College, now the University of Birmingham.

Parkes was born in Aston, Birmingham, one of six children of William Parkes, who worked in Birmingham's jewellery trade. He was educated at King Edward's Grammar School in Aston and at Mason Science College, a predecessor of the University of Birmingham. From 1891 to 1911 he was principal of the Nicholson Institute, Leek.

During 1922 he published his two volume survey Sculpture of Today. The papers for this work and an unpublished third volume are possessed by the Victoria & Albert Museum. A second two volume work The Art of Carved Sculpture was published in 1931. He was a regular contributor to magazines such as Architectural Review, Apollo and The Studio.
