= Marks' Standard Handbook for Mechanical Engineers =

Comprehensive handbook on mechanical engineering

Marks' Standard Handbook for Mechanical Engineers is a comprehensive handbook for the field of mechanical engineering. Originally based on the even older German Hütte, it was first published in 1916 by Lionel Simeon Marks. In 2017, its 12th edition, published by McGraw-Hill, marked the 100th anniversary of the work. The handbook was translated into several languages.

Lionel S. Marks was a professor of mechanical engineering at Harvard University and Massachusetts Institute of Technology in the early 1900s.

== Topics ==
The 11th edition consists of 20 sections:

1. Mathematical Tables and Measuring Units
2. Mathematics
3. Mechanics of Solids and Fluids
4. Heat
5. Strength of Materials
6. Materials of Engineering
7. Fuels and Furnaces
8. Machine Elements
9. Power Generation
10. Materials Handling
11. Transportation
12. Building Construction and Equipment
13. Manufacturing Processes
14. Fans, Pumps, and Compressors
15. Electrical and Electronics Engineering
16. Instruments and Controls
17. Industrial Engineering
18. The Regulatory Environment
19. Refrigeration, Cryogenics, and Optics
20. Emerging Technologies

== Editions ==
English editions:

- 1st edition, 1916, edited by Lionel Simeon Marks, based on the German Hütte
- 2nd edition, 1924, edited by Lionel Simeon Marks
- 3rd edition, 1930, Editor-in-Chief Lionel S. Marks, total issue 103,500, McGraw-Hill Book Co. Inc.
- 1941, edited by Lionel Peabody Marks
- 1951, edited by Lionel Peabody Marks and Alison Peabody Marks
- 1967, edited by Theodore Baumeister III
- 6th edition, 1958, edited by Eugene A. Avallone, Theodore Baumeister III
- 7th edition, golden (50th) anniversary, 1976?, edited by Theodore Baumeister III
- 8th edition, edited by Theodore Baumeister III, Eugene A. Avallone
- 9th edition
- 10th edition, 80th anniversary, 1997, edited by Eugene A. Avallone, Theodore Baumeister III,
- 11th edition, 90th anniversary, 2007, edited by Eugene A. Avallone, Theodore Baumeister III, Ali M. Sadegh
- 12th edition, 100th anniversary, 2017, edited by Ali M. Sadegh, William M. Worek, Eugene A. Avallone

== See also ==
- Hütte
