= Constance Naden =

19th-century English writer, poet, and philosopher

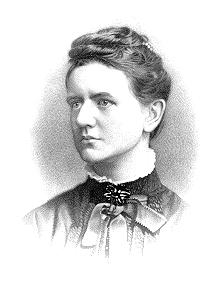
- Constance Naden
- Born: 24 January 1858; 15 Francis Road, Edgbaston, Birmingham, England
- Died: 23 December 1889 (aged 31)
- Resting place: Key Hill Cemetery, Birmingham
- Education: Birmingham and Midland Institute
- Alma mater: Mason Science College
- Occupations: Writer, poet and philosopher
- Writing career
- Notable works: Songs and Sonnets of Springtime

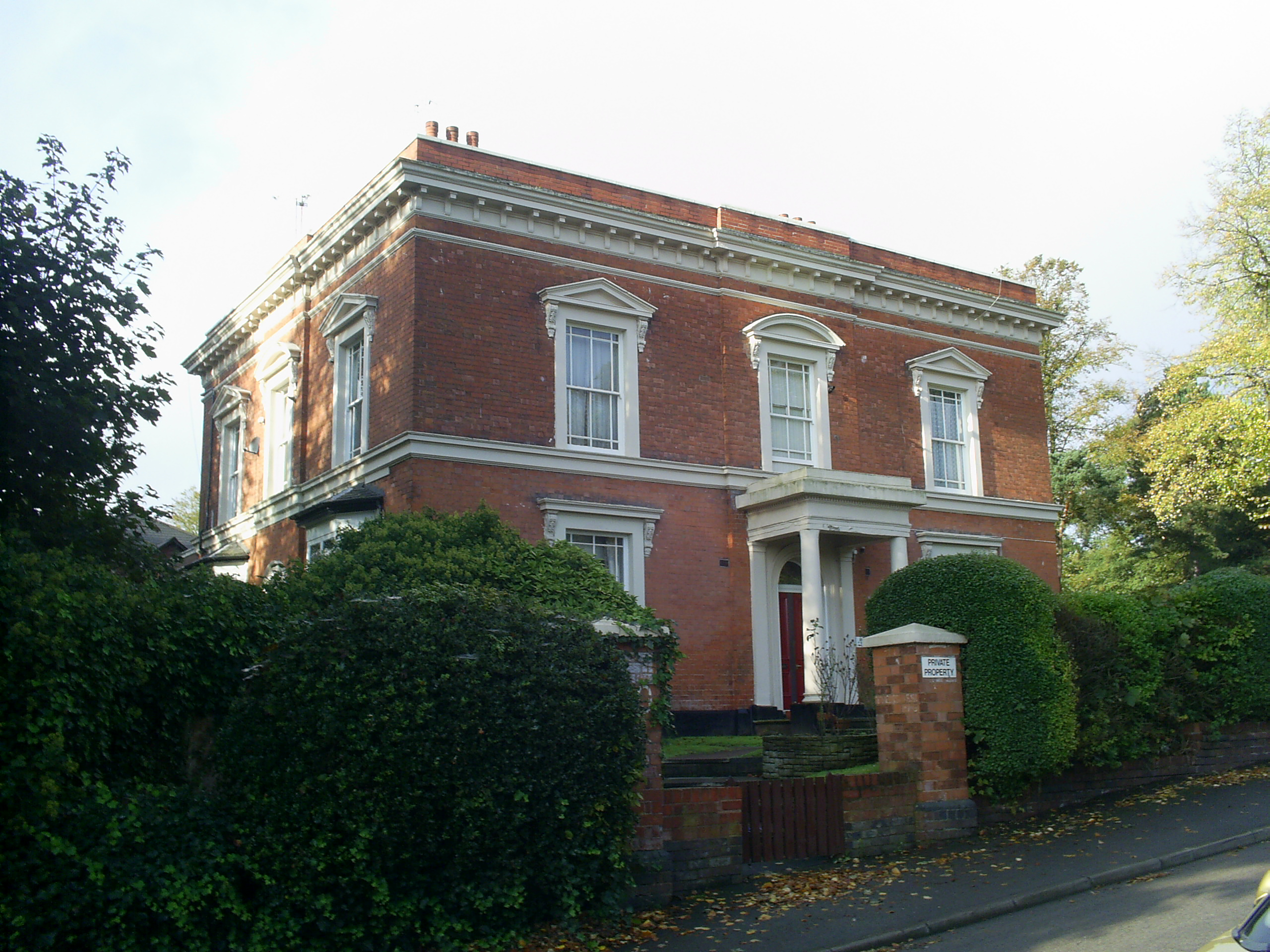
Naden's grandparents' home, Pakenham House, 20 Charlotte Road, Edgbaston, Birmingham

Constance Caroline Woodhill Naden (24 January 1858 – 23 December 1889) was an English writer, poet and philosopher. She studied, wrote and lectured on philosophy and science, alongside publishing two volumes of poetry. Several collected works were published following her death at the young age of 31. In her honour, Robert Lewins established the Constance Naden Medal and had a bust of her installed at Mason Science College (now the University of Birmingham). William Ewart Gladstone considered her one of the nineteenth century's foremost female poets.

== Early life ==
Constance Naden was born on 24 January 1858 at 15 Francis Road, Edgbaston, Birmingham, England to Caroline Ann Woodhill Naden who died within two weeks of giving birth, and Thomas Naden, an architect, later president of the Birmingham Architectural Association. She was brought up by her mother's parents, Caroline and Josiah Woodhill, from 12 days old until her grandparents' deaths. Naden's well-read and devout baptist grandparents lived at Pakenham House, Edgbaston. Her father lived with the Woodhills for a time, but by 1871 the census shows that he was living nearby with a new wife and Naden's four half-siblings aged between three and seven. At age eight Naden was sent to a local Unitarian day school, where she developed a talent for painting. She submitted some paintings to the Birmingham Society of Artists, one of which (titled 'Bird's Nest and Wild Roses') was accepted for display at the Society's Spring Exhibition in 1878.

== Education ==
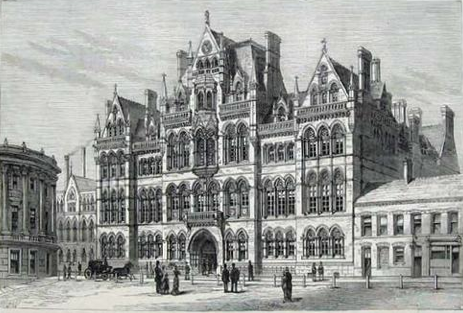
Mason Science College, now the University of Birmingham

She became interested in philosophy, languages and the sciences. In 1879, Naden attended the Birmingham and Midland Institute to study botany and French, and from 1881 to 1887 attended Mason Science College to study physics, geology, chemistry, physiology, and zoology; she also became a member of the Birmingham Natural History Society. Naden also edited the Mason College magazine. In 1885 she won the "Paxton prize" for an essay upon the geology of the district. In 1887 she won the "Heslop" gold medal for her long essay, Induction and Deduction, published after her death.

== Philosophy ==
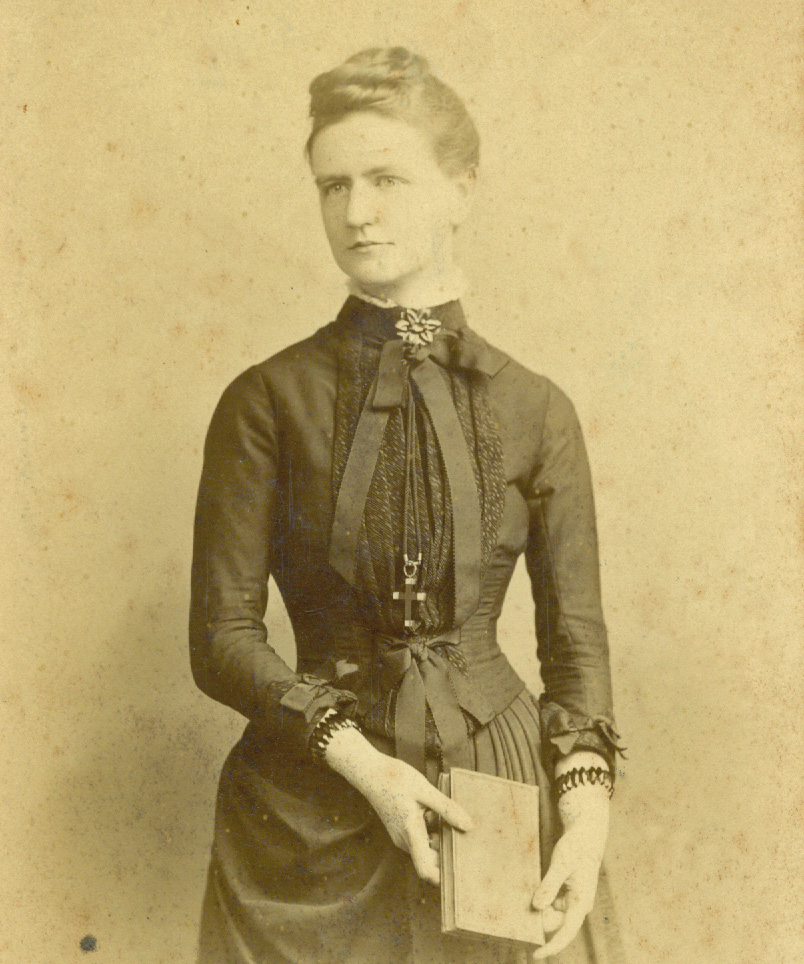

From the late 1870s onwards Naden developed a philosophy called Hylo-Idealism in collaboration with Robert Lewins, MD, whom she first met in 1876 and corresponded with for the rest of her life. The key principle of this philosophy is that "Man is the maker of his own Cosmos, and that all his perceptions – even those which seem to represent solid, extended and external objects – have a merely subjective existence, bounded by the limits moulded by the character and conditions of his sentient being."

Naden published a number of essays defending this view, in the Journal of Science, Knowledge, The Agnostic Annual and other periodicals. She used such signatures as "C.N.", "C.A." and "Constance Arden".

Naden was interested in Herbert Spencer's concept of a unifying philosophy explaining the universe through the principles of evolution. In his work The Social Organism (1860), Spencer compared society to a living organism and argued that, just as biological organisms evolve through natural selection, society evolves and increases in complexity.

== Poetic writing ==
In 1881, Naden published her first volume of poetry Songs and Sonnets of Springtime. This is a diverse collection, and her sonnet sequence that describes the changing of the seasons is particularly notable.

== Later life ==
Naden's grandmother Woodhill died on 21 June 1887 (Note: Naden's Grandfather Woodhill died previously on 27 December 1881.) and she inherited a considerable fortune, which allowed her to travel to Constantinople (Istanbul), Palestine, India, and Egypt with her friend the educationalist and campaigner for women's right to higher education, Madeline Daniell.

She returned to England in June 1888 and bought a house on Park Street, Grosvenor Square, which she shared with Daniell. She raised funding to allow Indian women to study medicine and became a member of the National Indian Association. She joined the Aristotelian Society, endeavoured to form a Spencer society, and belonged to various societies of benevolent aims. On 22 October 1889 she delivered an address upon Mr. Herbert Spencer's Principles of Sociology to the sociological section at Mason College. She also spoke about the need for women's suffrage at public events, as recorded by reports in the Women's Penny Paper.

Naden was described as:

slight and tall, with a delicate face and 'clear blue-grey eyes.' She was regular and active in her habits. She had a penetrating voice, and was thoroughly self-possessed in public speaking.

While some noted her tendency towards sarcasm in formal debates and academic discussions, she was well-loved and had very warm personal and intellectual friendships. This is attested to by the poignant remembrances of her friends in the posthumous Memoir, for example Prof. Charles Lapworth wrote that he saw her "not so much a student, [but] as an interested and sympathetic fellow-worker, and in her early death I have lost one of the best and dearest of my personal friends".

== Illness and death ==
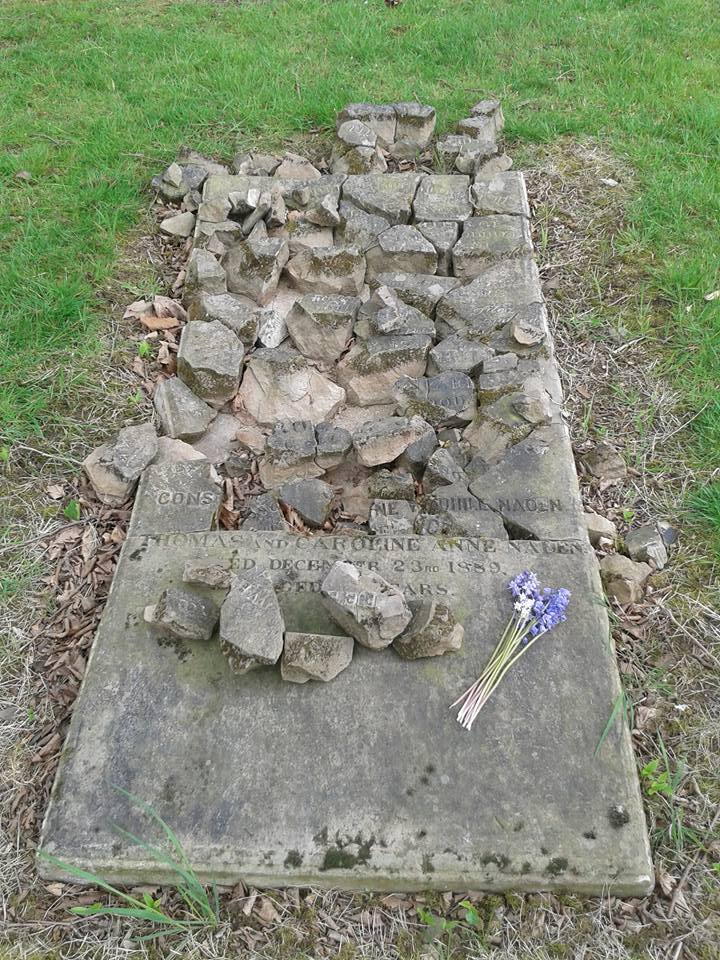
The grave of Constance Naden in Key Hill Cemetery, photographed in 2015 prior to restoration.

In 1889 a diagnosis of infected ovarian cysts was deemed to require surgery; on 5 December she was operated on by Lawson Tait, and while initially this was a success, on 23 December she died of a related infection. Naden's last letter to Robert Lewins, which is printed on the opening pages of the 1891 essay collection Further Reliques of Constance Naden details the circumstances of the surgery and her worries regarding it. She was buried in the nonconformist Key Hill Cemetery, Birmingham. The gravestone was badly damaged over the course of the twentieth century, and in September 2017 a campaign was launched to replace it with a more fitting memorial. A rededication ceremony for the new gravestone took place on Saturday 11 May 2019.

== Remembrance ==
Naden was lauded after her death for her philosophical writings, by Robert Lewins, M.D., her contributions to poetry, her support of the women's suffrage cause in popular women's periodicals, and for her "Pantheistic view of immortality" by William Ewart Gladstone, in which he ranked her among the nineteenth century's top female poets. Herbert Spencer, who had been an important influence on her work, remarked: "I can think of no woman, save 'George Eliot,' in whom there has been this union of high philosophical capacity with extensive acquisition. Unquestionably her subtle intelligence would have done much in furtherance of rational thought; and her death has entailed a serious loss." Lewins founded the Constance Naden Medal at Mason College in her honour, which is awarded each year, first for the "best competitive philosophical essay" and now for the best Faculty of Arts master's degree thesis at the University of Birmingham. Lewins also commissioned a bust of Naden which he presented to Mason's College. It sits on a plinth of three books, the spine of which are inscribed "Songs and Sonnets of Springtime and A Modern Apostle, The Elixir of Life, etc." on the front and "Induction and Deduction and Hylo-Idealism" on the back. It was originally placed in the college's library. Mason College became the University of Birmingham in 1900, and the bust stands in the Cadbury Research Library Reading Room.

On 14 December 2009, the Birmingham Civic Society provided a commemorative blue plaque which was unveiled by the Lord Mayor. It is located at her childhood home, Pakenham House 20 Charlotte Road, Edgbaston. The inscription reads "Constance C.W. Naden 1858–1889 Poet, Scientist and Philosopher lived here for most of her life."

Naden's grave in Key Hill Cemetery is shared with her mother and maternal grandparents. During the twentieth century the stone was broken up and buried, along with other memorials in the area; in 2010 it was excavated by the Friends of the Cemetery but it remained illegible. On 11 May 2019, following a successful fundraising campaign by the Constance Naden Trust, a rededication ceremony was held to mark the installation of Constance Naden's new gravestone. The replacement stone reproduces the text on the original but draws additional attention to Naden's achievements with the words 'Poet, philosopher, artist, Scientist' newly inscribed near the top of the stone along with a line from her 1881 poem 'The Pantheist's Song of Immortality': 'For earth is not as though thou ne'er hadst been'.

== Posthumous publications ==
Three books were published posthumously, Induction and deduction, and other essays (1890), Further Reliques of Constance Naden (1891) and The Complete Poetical Works of Constance Naden (1894).

== Critical reception ==
Naden's poetry has received increasing attention since the 1980s, as people sought to recover lost women's voices. A range of scholarship on her life and works has appeared, with particular focus on the interplay between literature and science in her works, her relationship with freethought, and her proto-feminist ideas. Clare Stainthorp has published an overview of the first three decades of critical writings on Naden, in which she also suggests avenues for future research. In 2019, Stainthorp's book Constance Naden: Scientist, Philosopher, Poet provided the first in depth consideration of Naden's life and explored the significance of her published and unpublished poems and essays.
