= Josephine Preston Peabody =

American poet

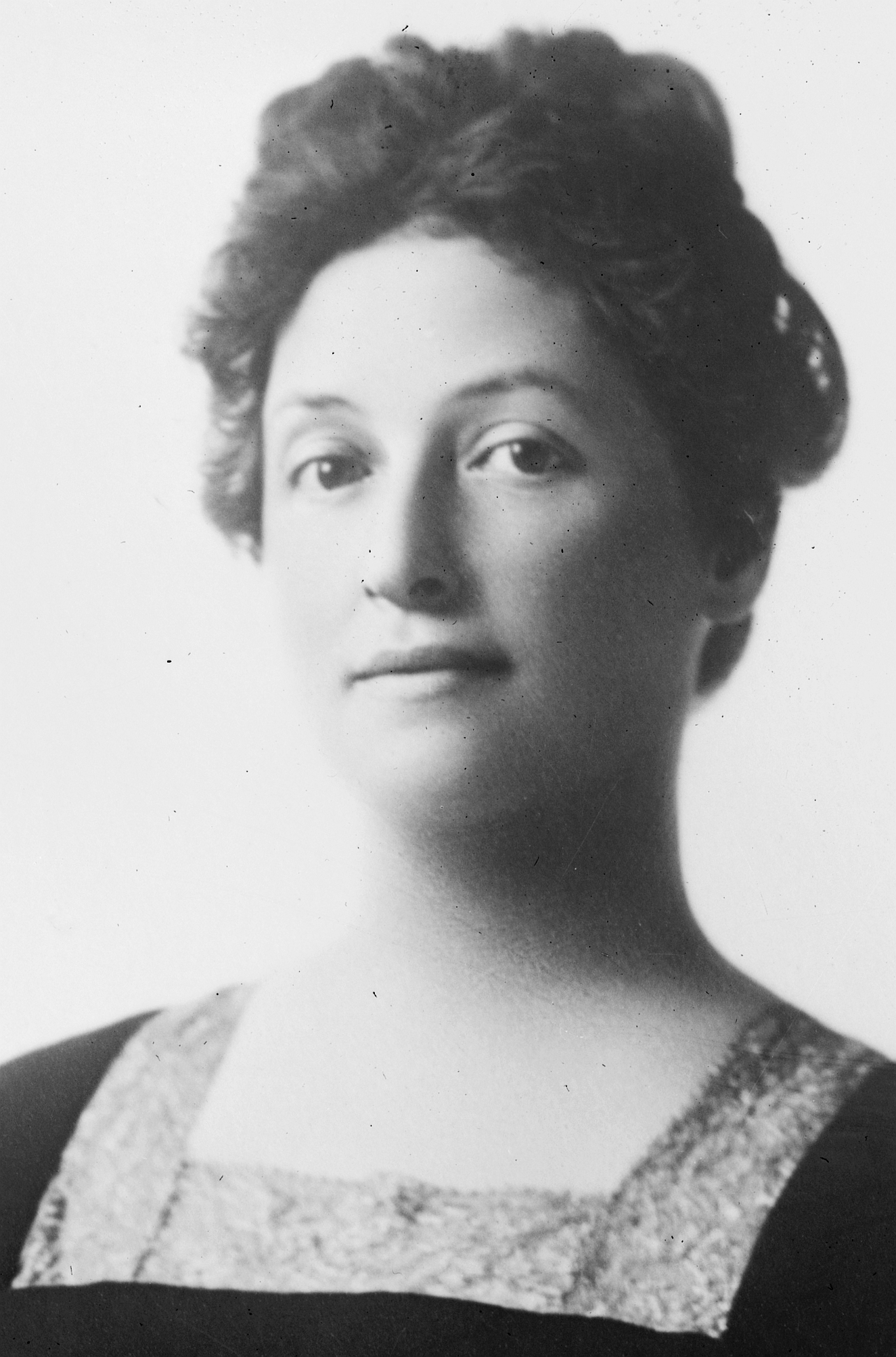
Josephine Preston Peabody

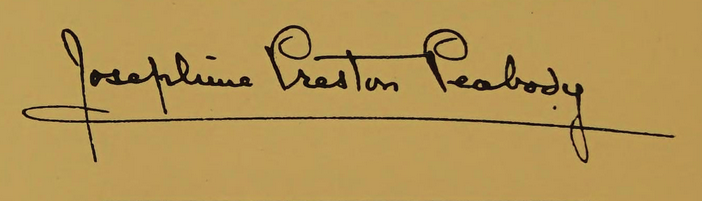
signature

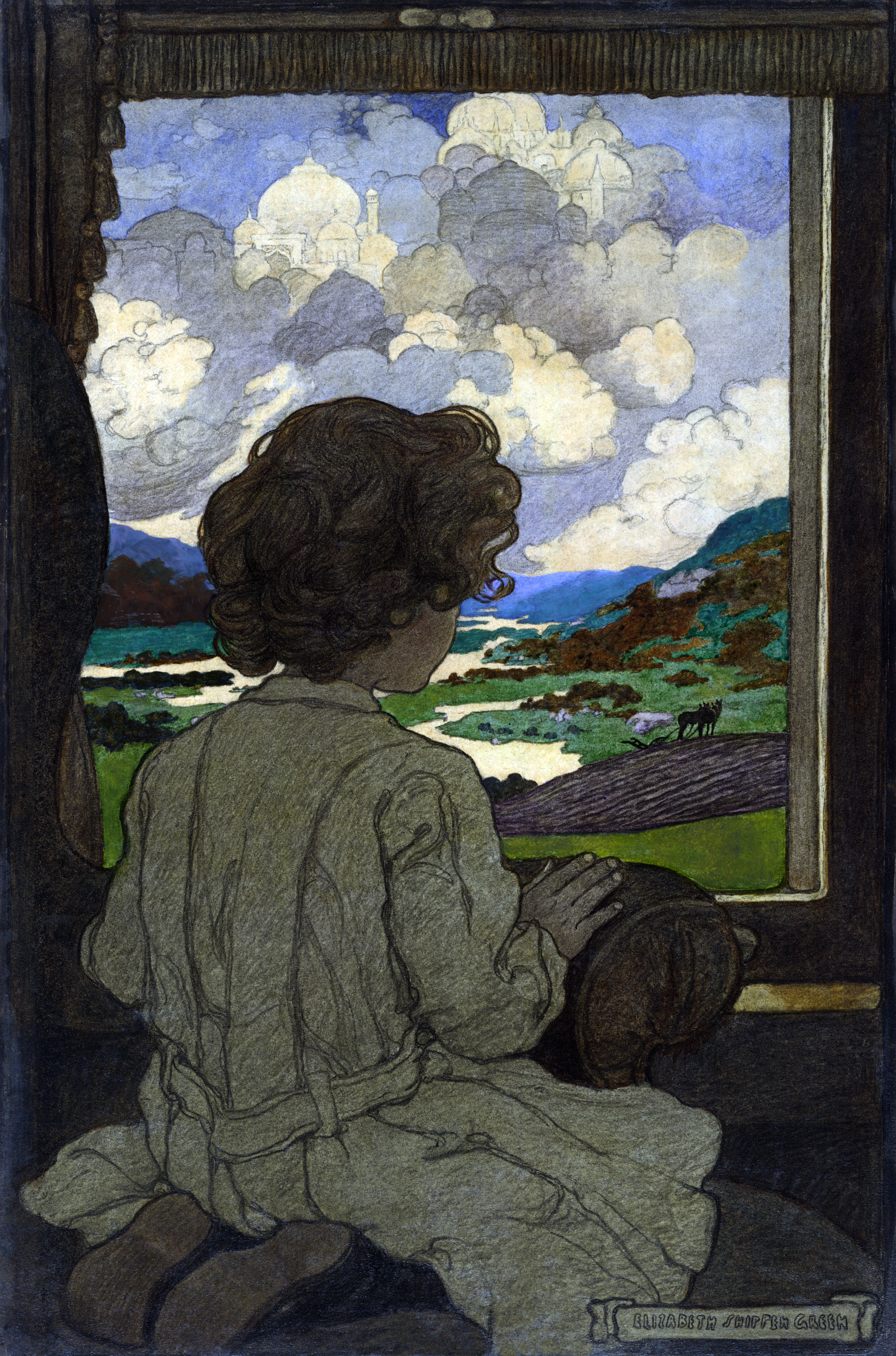
"The Journey": illustration by Elizabeth Shippen Green for a series of poems by Josephine Preston Peabody, entitled "The Little Past", which relate experiences of childhood from a child's perspective. Poems and illustration were published in Harper's Magazine, December 1903.

Josephine Preston Peabody (May 30, 1874 – December 4, 1922) was an American poet and dramatist.

== Biography ==
Peabody was born in New York and educated at the Girls' Latin School, Boston, and at Radcliffe College. She also participated in George Pierce Baker's Harvard Workshop 47.

In 1898, she was introduced to fifteen-year-old Khalil Gibran by Fred Holland Day, the American photographer and co-founder of the Copeland-Day publishing house, at an art exhibition. Shortly thereafter Gibran returned to Lebanon but the pair continued to correspond.

From 1901 to 1903, she was instructor in English at Wellesley. The Stratford-on-Avon prize went to her in 1909 for her drama The Piper, which was produced in England in 1910; and in America at the New Theatre, New York City, in 1911. Composer Grace Chadbourne used Peabody's text for her songs "Green Singing Book" and "Window Pane Songs".

On June 21, 1906 she married Lionel Simeon Marks, a British engineer and professor at Harvard University. They had a daughter, Alison Peabody Marks (July 30, 1908 – April 7, 2008), and a son, Lionel Peabody Marks (February 10, 1910 - January 25, 1984).

== Selected works ==
- Old Greek Folk Stories Told Anew (1897)
- The Wayfarers: A Book of Verse (1898)
- Fortune and Men's Eyes: New Poems, with a Play (1900)
- In the Silence (1900)
- Marlowe (her first play),
- The Singing Leaves; a book of songs and spells (1903)
- The Wings (1905), a drama
- The Book of the Little Past (1908)
- The Piper: A Play in Four Acts (1909)
- The Singing Man (1911), poems
- The Wolf of Gubbio (1913)
- New Poems (1915)
