= Mason Science College =

College in Birmingham, England

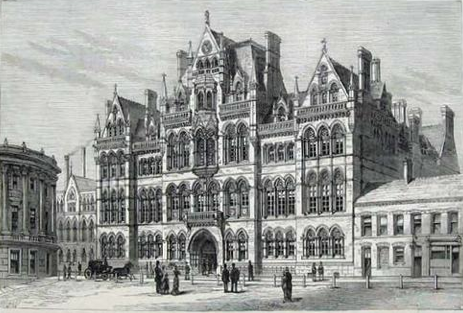

- Location within England

General information
- Status: Demolished
- Architectural style: Victorian Gothic
- Location: Edmund Street, Birmingham, England
- Coordinates: 52.4800°N 1.9051°W
- Construction started: 23 February 1875
- Opened: 1 October 1880
- Demolished: 1964
- Cost: £60,000
- Client: Josiah Mason

Technical details
- Floor count: 4

Design and construction
- Architect: Jethro Cossins

References
- Ballard, Phillada (2009). Birmingham's Victorian and Edwardian Architects. Oblong Creative Limited. p. 231. ISBN 978-0-9556576-2-7.

Mason Science College was a university college in Birmingham, England, and a predecessor college of the University of Birmingham. Founded in 1875 by industrialist and philanthropist Sir Josiah Mason, the college was incorporated into the University of Birmingham in 1900. Two students of the college, Neville Chamberlain and Stanley Baldwin, later went on to become prime ministers of the United Kingdom.

== History ==
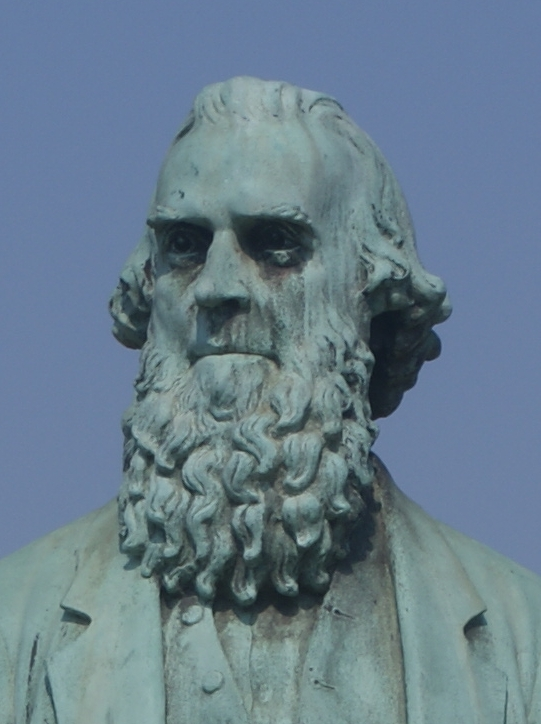
Sir Josiah Mason, the founder of Mason Science College. Bust by William Bloye, after Francis John Williamson.

The college was established by an English industrialist and philanthropist Sir Josiah Mason in 1875. The building of the college in Edmund Street, Birmingham was designed by Jethro Cossins and opened on 1 October 1880 and was marked by a speech by Thomas Henry Huxley. In the speech, Huxley considered the opening of the college as a victory for scientific cause and supported Mason's antagonistic views on the classics and theology. The college developed various liberal and vocational subjects, but forced out the artisans. The medical and scientific departments of Queen's College, Birmingham moved to the nearby Mason Science College.

Mason University College Act 1897
- Act of Parliament
- Parliament of the United Kingdom
- Long title: An Act for incorporating Mason University College and for other purposes.
- Citation: 60 & 61 Vict. c. xx

Dates
- Royal assent: 3 June 1897

Other legislation
- Repealed by: Birmingham University Act 1900

Status: Repealed

Text of statute as originally enacted

In 1898, it became Mason University College, with Joseph Chamberlain becoming the President of Court of Governors of the college. In 1900 it was incorporated into the University of Birmingham. Students at the college were awarded their degrees by the University of London until the University of Birmingham was established and received degree awarding powers in its own right.

William A. Tilden was professor of chemistry from 1880 to 1894. In September 1893, Francis William Aston began his university studies at the college, where he was taught physics by John Henry Poynting and chemistry by Frankland and Tilden.

In 1881, Charles Lapworth became the first professor of geology at the college. In 1891, physics professor John Henry Poynting successfully calculated the mean density of the Earth.

The Mason College building housed Birmingham University's Faculties of Arts and Law for over half a century after the founding of the University in 1900. The Faculty of Arts building on the Edgbaston campus was not constructed until 1959–61. The Faculties of Arts and Law then moved to the Edgbaston Campus.

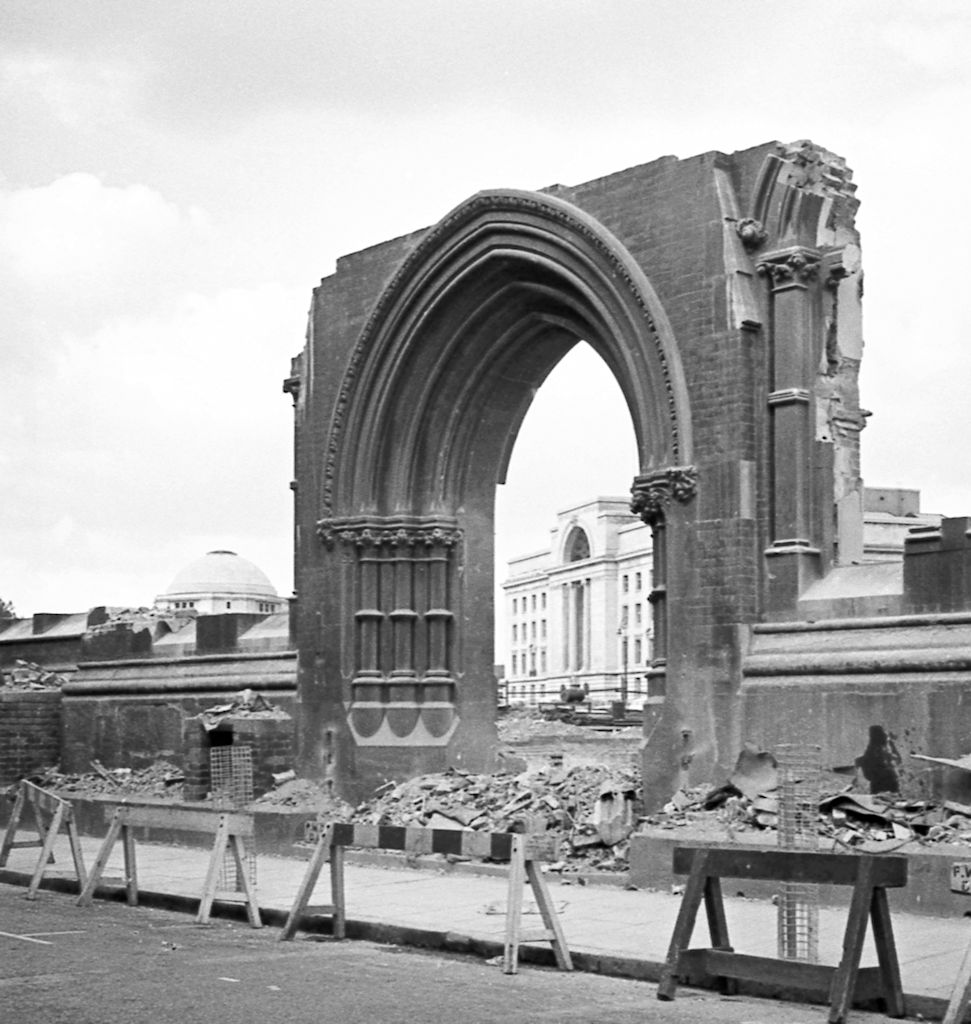
One of the last remaining traces of the former Josiah Mason College building in Edmund Street, seen in 1969. Baskerville House is visible through the archway, and the dome of the Hall of Memory rises above the ruins to the left.

After the Second World War, the style of architecture was not as appreciated as it is now. Paul Cadbury referred to it in 1952 as a neo-gothic monstrosity and expected it to be demolished within 50 years. In the event, it was demolished in 1964, along with the original Central Public Library and the Birmingham and Midland Institute, as part of the redevelopment within the inner ring road. The former Central Library stood on the site of the old college, the library having moved to a new site in 2013; the building was demolished in 2016.

== Departments ==
During the first academic session of the college in 1880 courses in physics, chemistry, biology and mathematics were offered to students. By 1881 courses in geology and mineralogy, botany and vegetable physiology, engineering, English language and literature, Greek and Latin, and French and German language and literature were also available. From 1882 Medical students at Queen's College, Birmingham were able to attend classes in botany, physiology and chemistry, and in 1892 the medical faculty of Queen's College was transferred to Mason College. There was also a short-lived department of 'Mental and Moral Science', which was not successful despite funds being gifted specifically to support the endeavor in 1882.

== Academics and alumni ==
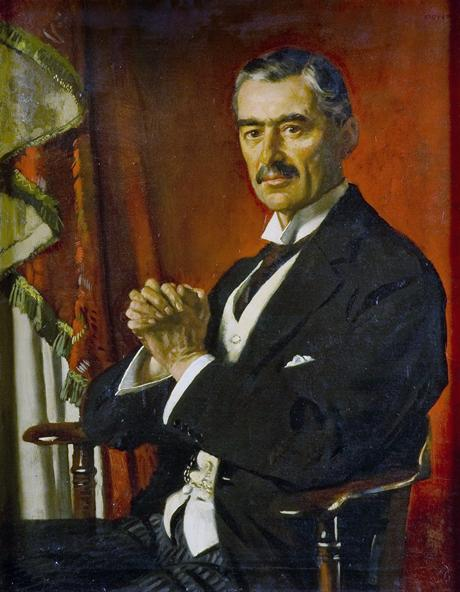
Prime Minister Neville Chamberlain

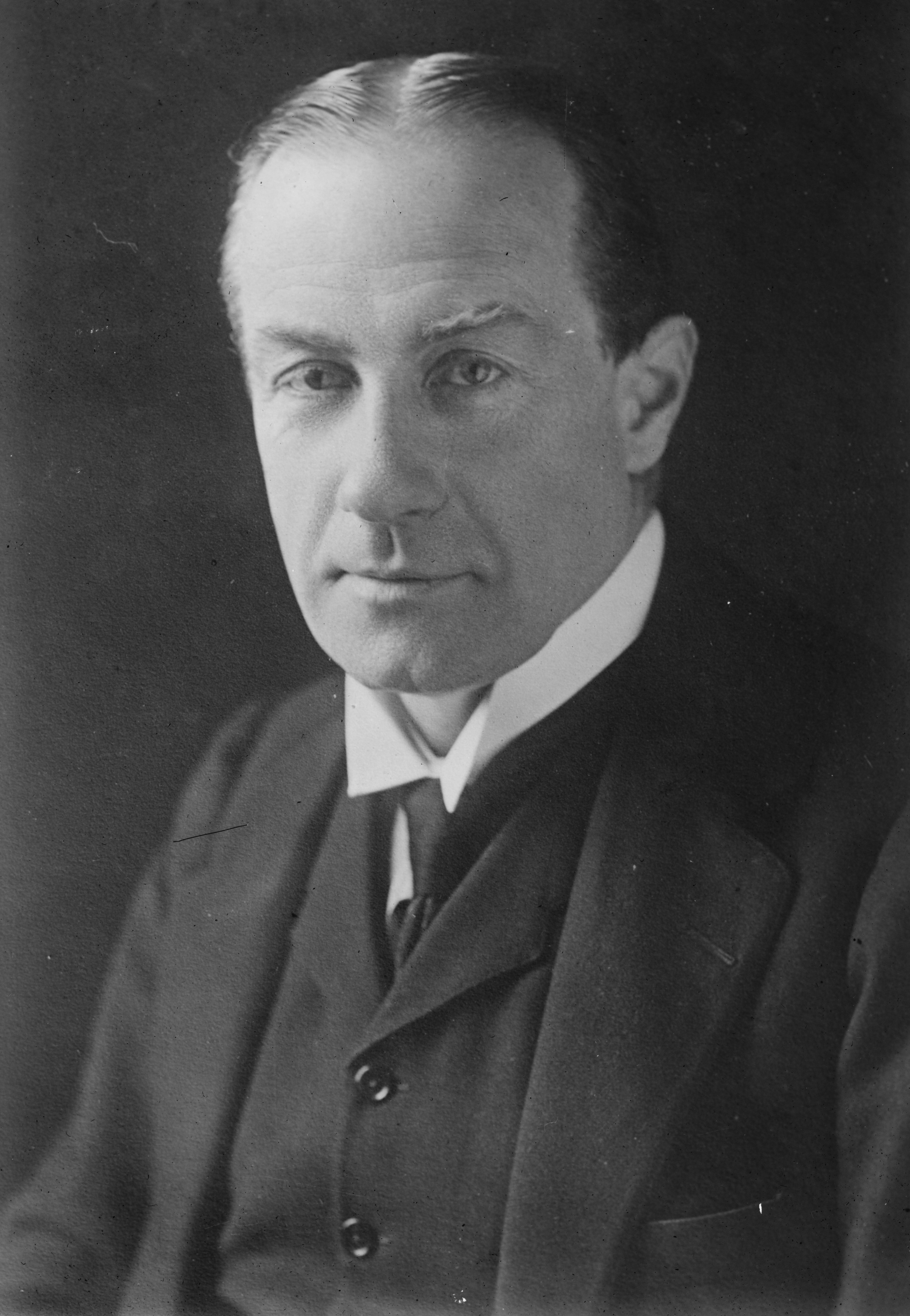
Prime Minister Stanley Baldwin

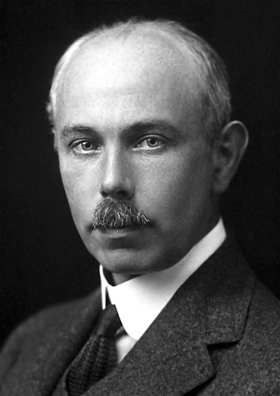
Nobel Prize Winner Francis William Aston

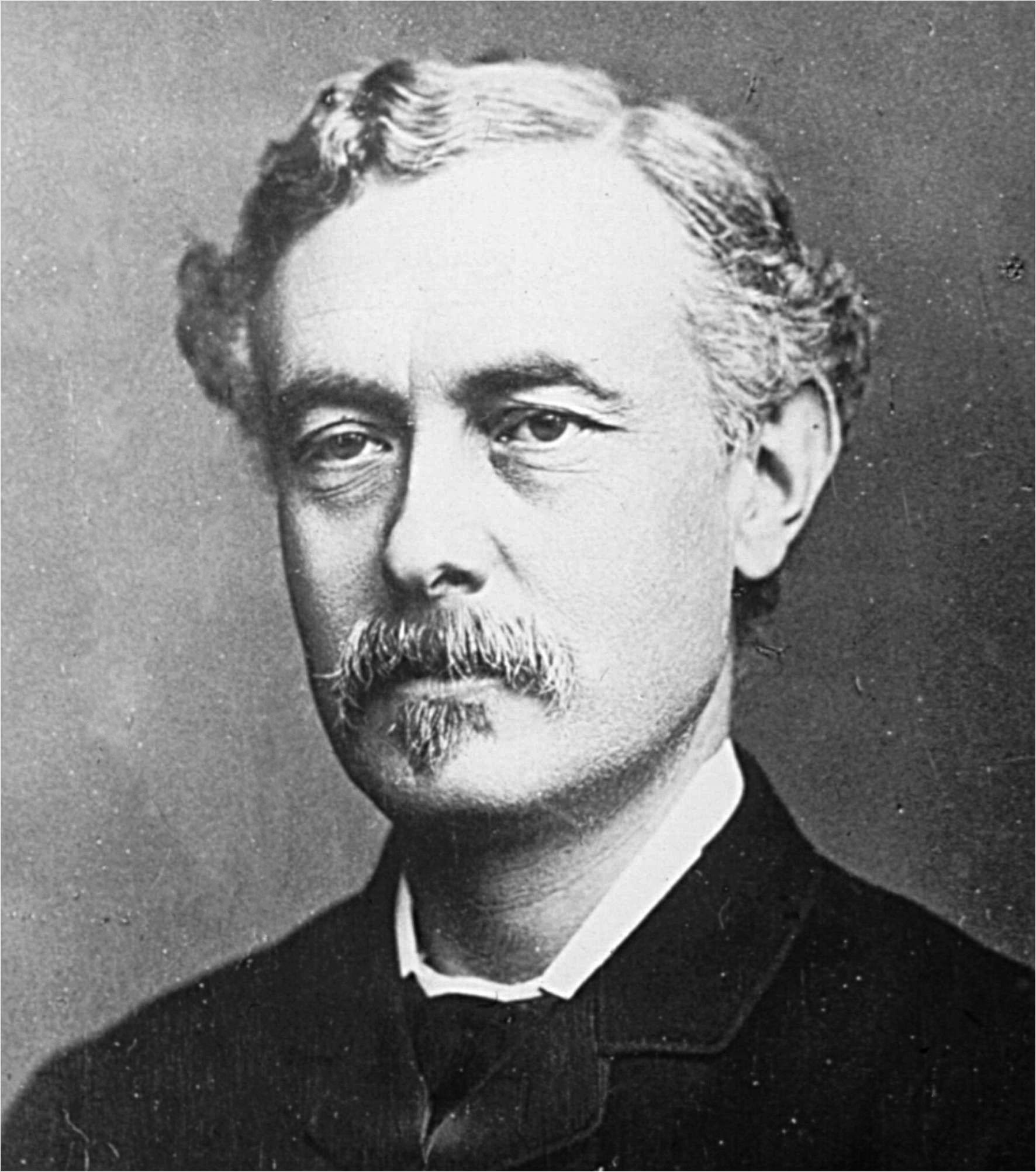
Sir William Tilden

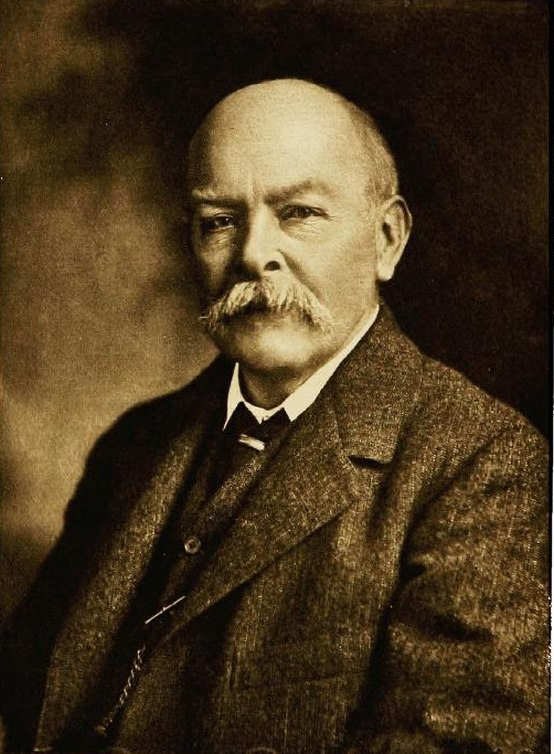
John Henry Poynting

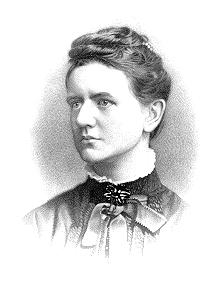
Constance Naden

Notable academics and alumni of the college include:

- Edward Arber, academic and writer
- Francis William Aston, chemist and physicist, 1922 Nobel Prize in Chemistry
- Stanley Baldwin, British Prime Minister
- Sir Gilbert Barling, 1st Baronet, physician
- John Belling, cytogeneticist who developed the iron-acetocarmine staining technique which is used in the study of chromosomes
- Sir Nathan Bodington, Professor of classics
- T. W. Bridge, FRS, professor of zoology and one of Mason's first four professors
- Adrian John Brown, FRS, pioneer in the study of enzyme kinetics
- Arthur Henry Reginald Buller, British-Canadian mycologist mainly known as a researcher of fungi in general, and wheat rust in particular
- Neville Chamberlain, British Prime Minister
- Lawrence Crawford (mathematician) FRSE (1867–1951), taught in the college
- Sir Guy Dain, Chairman of the British Medical Association 1943–49 (M.B. medicine)
- Hermann Georg Fiedler, German scholar
- Sir Henry Fowler, locomotive engineer
- Percy F. Frankland, chemist
- Ernest Gold, set up the first operational (military) meteorological service, Deputy Director of the Meteorological Office
- John Berry Haycraft, discovered an anticoagulant created by the leech, which he named hirudin
- John Rippiner Heath, physician and composer
- Micaiah John Muller Hill, FRS, English mathematician, known for Hill's spherical vortex and Hill's tetrahedra
- Charles William Hobley, pioneering colonial administrator in Kenya
- Frank Horton, Professor of Physics at Royal Holloway College and Vice-Chancellor of the University of London 1939–45
- Henry Eliot Howard, ornithologist
- Arthur Lapworth, FRS, chemist
- Charles Lapworth, FRS, FGS, geologist who pioneered faunal analysis using index fossils and identified the Ordovician period
- Robert Thomson Leiper, parasitologist and helminthologist
- Lionel Simeon Marks, engineer and one of the pioneers of aeronautics
- Gerald Rusgrove Mills, publisher who established the publishing company Mills & Boon
- John Henry Muirhead, philosopher
- Constance Naden, poet and philosopher
- Charles Talbut Onions, English grammarian and lexicographer and the fourth editor of the Oxford English Dictionary
- Kineton Parkes, novelist and art historian
- Sir Leonard Parsons, Professor of Paediatrics, dean of Birmingham medical school, in 1932 the first to use synthetic vitamin C to treat scurvy in children
- Sir Robert Howson Pickard, chemist who did pioneering work in stereochemistry and was Vice Chancellor of the University of London from 1937–1939
- John Henry Poynting, physicist
- Dame Ethel Shakespear, geologist, public servant and philanthropist
- Edward Adolf Sonnenschein, Classical Scholar and writer on Latin grammar and verse
- F. J. M. Stratton, Professor of Astrophysics at the University of Cambridge
- Sir William A. Tilden, chemist
- Swale Vincent, physiologist
- William Whitehead Watts, FRS, geologist
- Wilmer Cave Wright, philologist and historian of science and medicine
- John Howard Whitehouse, Liberal Member of Parliament
- Sir Bertram Windle, physician

== Sources ==
- Ordnance Survey 1st Edition Map, 1890
- Ulrls.lon.ac.uk
- Ulrls.lon.ac.uk
- Ulrls.lon.ac.uk
- Ulrls.lon.ac.uk
- Ulrls.lon.ac.uk
- Ulrls.lon.ac.uk
- Archive.org
- Ulrls.lon.ac.uk
