= Lawrence Crawford (mathematician) =

Scottish mathematician (1867-1951)

- Born: 14 March 1867; Glasgow, Scotland
- Died: 5 April 1951 (aged 84); Cape Town, South Africa
- Other names: Laurence Crawford
- Occupation: Mathematician

Lawrence Crawford (sometimes written Laurence Crawford) FRSE LLD (14 March 1867 – 5 April 1951) was a Scottish-born mathematician. He was a co-founder of the re-established Royal Society of South Africa in 1908 and served as its President from 1936 to 1941. He was an expert on the Lame function, Mathieu function and proved Klein's theorem.

== Life ==
He was born on 14 March 1867, the son of John Crawford of Glasgow. He was educated at the High School in Glasgow and then Glasgow University winning three separate bursaries due to his high skill level. He then won a place at King's College, Cambridge where he won the Glyn and Richards Prizes before graduating MA in 1890. He was then elected a Fellow of King's College where he then continued, doing research.

In 1893 he moved to Birmingham to lecture in Mathematics at Mason College. In 1899 he moved to Cape Colony being offered a professorship in Pure Mathematics at the South African College, and in 1918 moved to the newly created University of Cape Town where he remained until retiral in 1938.

In 1903 he was elected a Fellow of the Royal Society of Edinburgh. His proposers were William Thomson, Lord Kelvin, Thomas Muir, George Chrystal and John Sturgeon Mackay. In 1939 the University of Witwatersrand gave him an honorary doctorate (LLD). In 1944 he became a City Councillor in Cape Town.

He died suddenly in Cape Town on 5 April 1951 following his return from a public meeting.

== Family ==
He married Annie M. Spilhaus in 1903. They had three sons and two daughters.

== Publications ==
- On the Use of the Hyperbolic Sine and Cosine (1895)
- The Tides (1897)
- The Trisection of a Given Angle (1898)
- Evaluation of a Determinant (1900)
- Edward Waring, eighteenth century Mathematician (1942)
