= William A. Tilden =

British chemist (1846–1926)

Sir William Augustus Tilden FRS
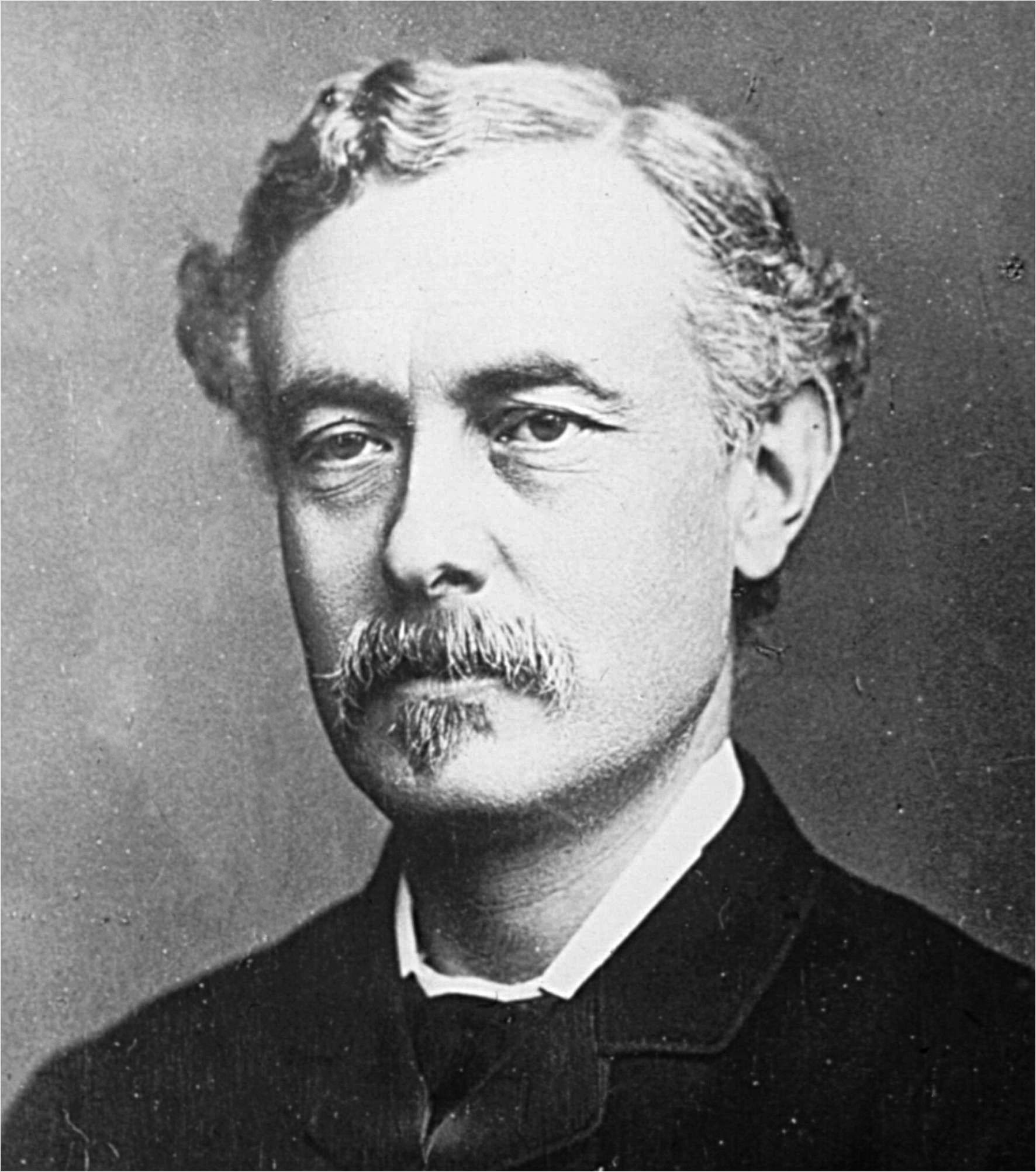
- Born: 15 August 1842
- Died: 11 December 1926 (aged 84)
- Education: Bedford Modern School
- Alma mater: University of London

William Augustus Tilden FRS (15 August 1842 – 11 December 1926) was a British chemist. He discovered that isoprene could be made from turpentine. He was unable to turn this discovery into a way to make commercially viable synthetic rubber.

== Life ==
Educated at Bedford Modern School, Tilden obtained a B Sc in 1868 and a D Sc in 1871, both from the University of London. From 1872 to 1880 he was Senior Teacher of Science at Clifton College, Bristol. From 1880 to 1894, he was professor of chemistry at Mason College, (which later became the University of Birmingham). From 1894 until his death, he was at the Royal College of Science, London, being professor of chemistry to 1909, Dean from 1905 to 1909, and then emeritus professor.

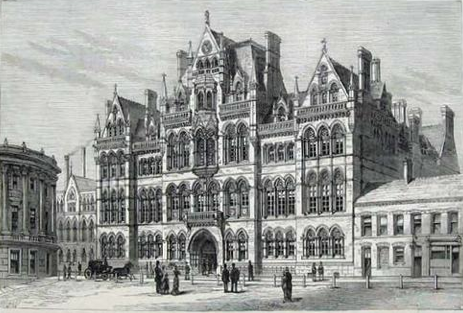
Mason College, now the University of Birmingham

He became a Fellow of the Royal Society in 1880 and was vice-president from 1904 to 1906. In 1908, he was awarded the Davy Medal of the society. He was president of the Chemical Society from 1903 to 1905. The Tilden Prize was named in his memory by the society in 1939 and has been awarded annually (now by the Royal Society of Chemistry) to three younger members since then. He held office in many other organisations, including the British Association for the Advancement of Science, the Institute of Chemistry (renamed Royal Institute of Chemistry in 1885) and the Society of Chemical Industry.

He published Famous Chemists: the men and their work (George Routledge and Sons Ltd.) in 1921. His son, Philip Armstrong Tilden became a prominent architect.
